= Big Thicket =

Heavily forested area of Southeast Texas, US

Big Thicket National Preserve
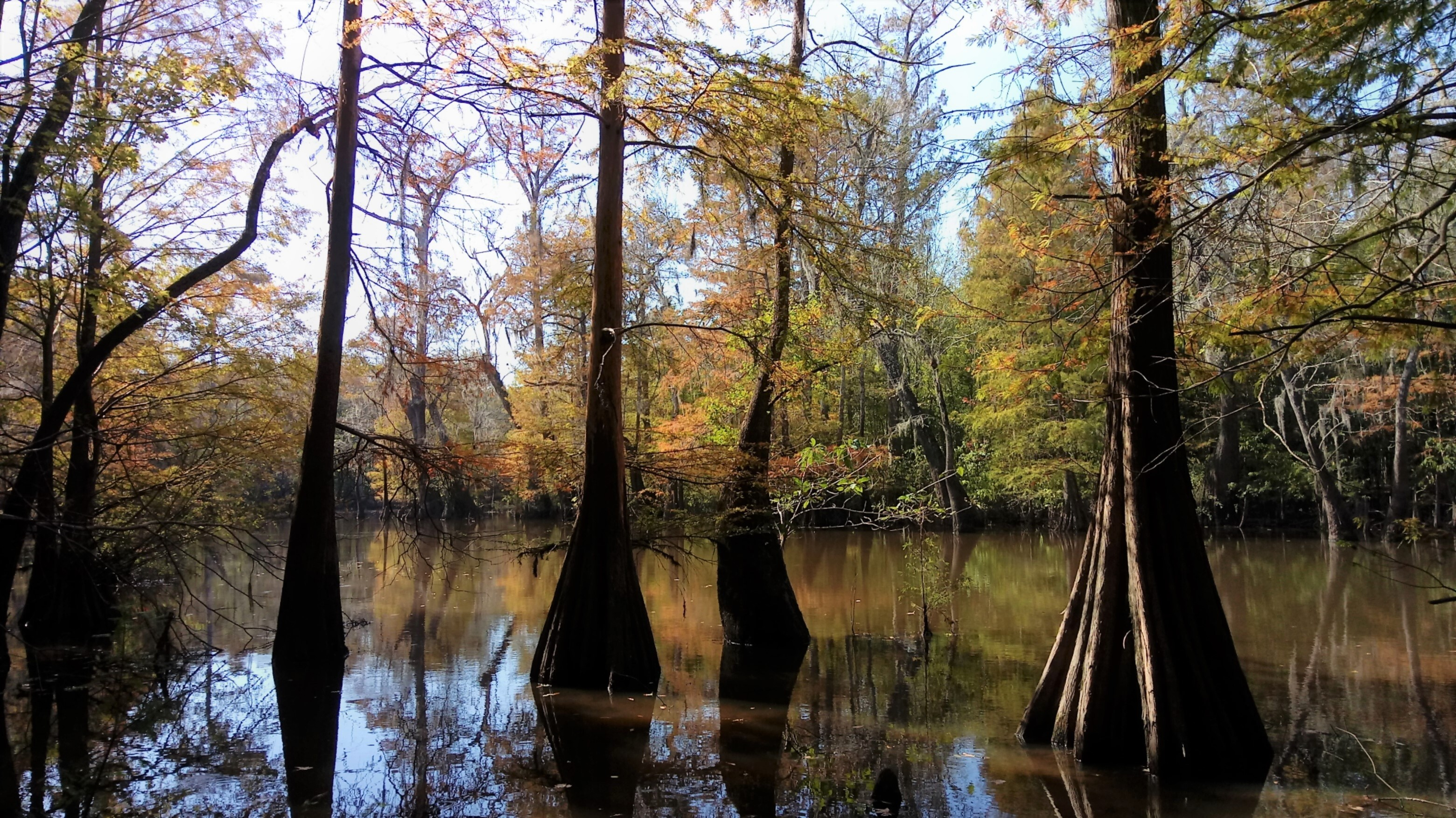

- Location within Texas Location within the United States
- Location: Southeast Texas, U.S.
- Nearest city: Kountze, Texas
- Coordinates: 30°32′51″N 94°20′24″W
- Area: 113,122 acres (457.79 km^{2})
- Authorized: October 11, 1974
- Visitors: 228,310 (in 2025)
- Governing body: National Park Service
- Website: Big Thicket National Preserve

The Big Thicket is the name given to a somewhat imprecise region of a heavily forested area of Southeast Texas in the United States. This area represents a portion of the mixed pine-hardwood forests or "Piney Woods" of the Southeast US. The National Park Service established the Big Thicket National Preserve (BTNP) within the region in 1974 and it is recognized as a biosphere reserve by UNESCO. Although the diversity of animals in the area is high for a temperate zone with over 500 vertebrates, it is the complex mosaic of ecosystems and plant diversity that is particularly remarkable. Biologists have identified at least eight, and up to eleven, ecosystems in the Big Thicket area. More than 160 species of trees and shrubs, 800 herbs and vines, and 340 types of grasses are known to occur in the Big Thicket, and estimates as high as over 1000 flowering plant species and 200 trees and shrubs have been made, plus ferns, carnivorous plants, and more. The Big Thicket has historically been the most dense forest region in Texas.

Existing literature states that Native Americans were known to have lived and hunted in the area nomadically, but did not establish permanent settlements there before the Alabama–Coushatta settled in the northeast about 1780. However, there is insufficient archaeological evidence to support this claim. What records that do exist could suggest human occupation dating back to the Clovis culture 13,400–12,700 years ago, with numerous era diagnostic points being found in all but one of the counties commonly considered to be in the Big Thicket. Spanish explorers and missionaries had a sporadic presence in the region, however colonization and settlement was not their aim, preferring to establish forts outside of the Region where the French were encroaching from the east (namely around Natchitoches, Nacogdoches, and the lower Trinity river valley).

After the 13th Amendment to the U.S. Constitution was officially ratified and adopted in late 1865, “Emancipated people settled in the Big Thicket and survived off the land, using the woods of southeast Texas for homesteading, hunting, and foraging.”

Logging in the late 19th and 20th centuries dramatically reduced the forest concentration. Efforts to save the Big Thicket from the devastation of oil and lumber industries started as early as the 1920s with the founding of the East Texas Big Thicket Association by Richard Elmer Jackson.

Conservatively the area occupies all of Hardin County, most of Polk, and Tyler Counties, and parts of Jasper, Liberty and San Jacinto Counties, including areas between the Neches River on the east, the Trinity River on the west, Pine Island Bayou on the south, to the higher elevations and older Eocene geological formations to the north. Broader interpretations have included the area between the Sabine River on the east and the San Jacinto River on the west including much of Montgomery, Newton, Trinity, and Walker Counties, as well. Several attempts to define the boundaries of the Big Thicket have been made, including a biological survey in 1936 which included over 3,350,000 acres (13,600 km^{2}) covering 14 counties. A later botanical based study in 1972 included a region of over 2,000,000 acres (8,100 km^{2}). This same habitat extends into Louisiana and eastward.

== Geography ==
One's fondness for the area is hard to explain. It has no commanding peak or awesome gorge, no topographical feature of distinction. Its appeal is more subtle.

— Big Thicket Legacy, University of Texas Press, 1977

=== Physical geography ===
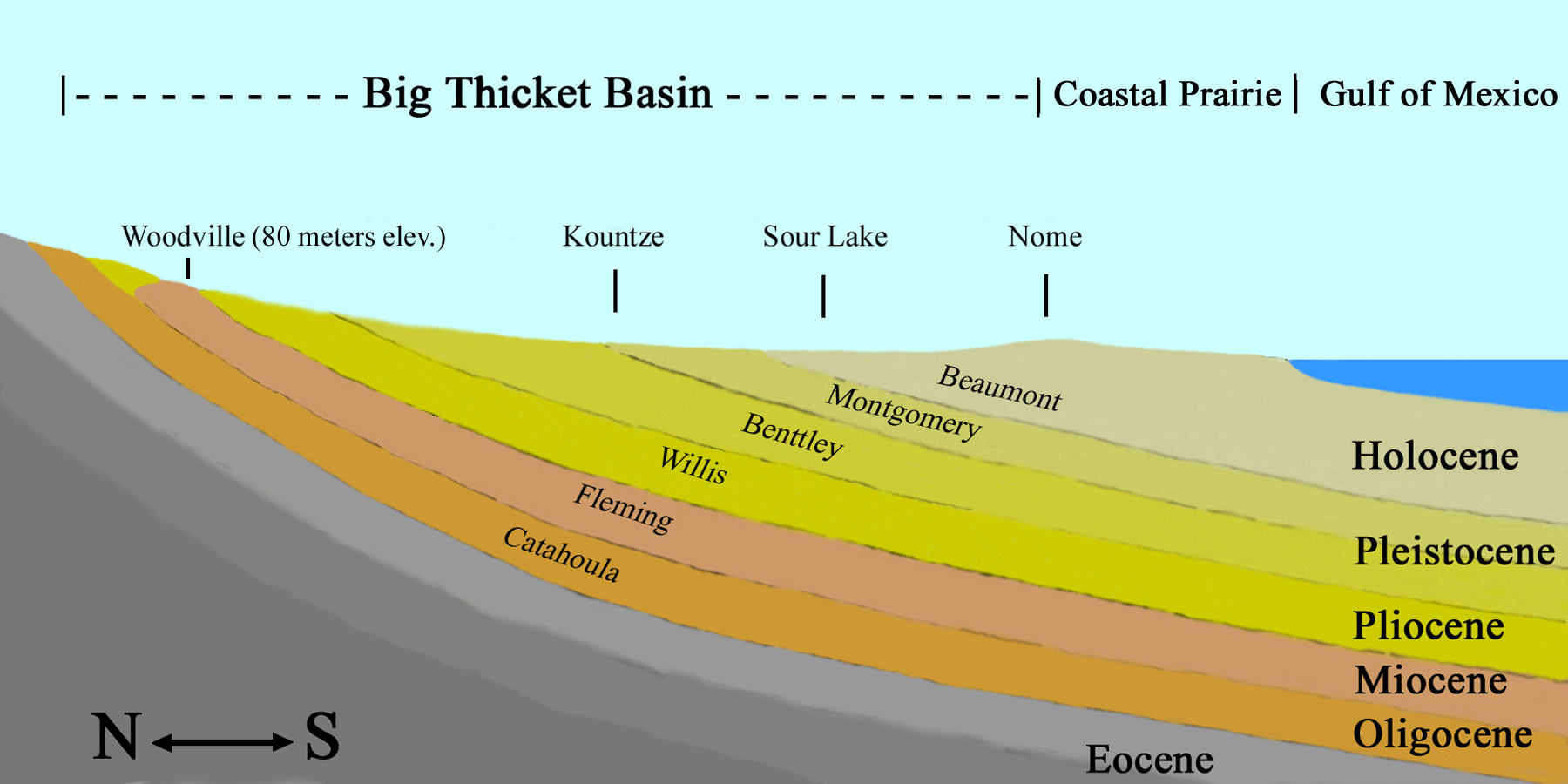
Geological formations (diagonal center) of the Big Thicket Basin and the epochs in which they were formed (lower right). This is a generalized illustration and it is not accurate in scale or proportion.

Geology: The Big Thicket is notable for the unusually high diversity of plants concentrated in a relatively small area. A major factor enabling this diversity is an unusually high diversity of soils. The exposed surface soils are relatively recent, late Cenozoic Era, predominantly Miocene, Pliocene, Pleistocene, and Holocene Epoch formations. Other than some slight and uniform tilting, the strata are not greatly deformed. The strata were laid down in several cycles of glaciations and warmer interglacial interludes. Although glaciers never extended as far south as Texas, it was during these cold periods that enough water was frozen in polar regions to lower sea levels and the Big Thicket area was dry land well above sea level. Conversely, during the warmer interludes, enough ice melted to increase sea levels and submerge Southeast Texas in the sea. It was during those warmer periods of submersion that alluvial and delta deposits from the streams and rivers of the continent laid down the succession of strata, each new layer burying and compacting the previous. At some point there was an approximately 1% tilting of the layers. Some say it was caused by the rising of the Rocky Mountains, while others say it was the weight of the successive deposits that eventually caused the Gulf of Mexico to subside. The older Pliocene, Miocene, and Oligocene formations are exposed in the north (Polk, San Jacinto, and Tyler counties), while the more recent Quaternary Period formations are exposed in the south (Hardin and Liberty counties).

Soils: The soils of the various formations at the surface have shifted and intermingled through erosion and other factors over time and can be locally quite complex. The Big Thicket contains a greater variety of soils than any area of comparable size in the United States. Sources vary, but from 50 to 100 soil types are said to occur in Hardin County alone. The surface soils tend to be slightly to strongly acidic, and only occasionally neutral in much of the Big Thicket Basin. However, calcareous or alkaline soils do occur in the region, particularly along the Trinity River, in the Beaumont Formation to the south, the Fleming Formation to the north, and northern areas of the Willis Formation where the layer is thin and erosion and road cuts have exposed the Fleming Formation. Most plants are sensitive to soil pH levels (acidic, neutral, or alkaline) and many species will only grow in areas with a specific soil type. Claude A. McLeod's study stated that the Big Thicket was "an edaphicmesophytic climax forest" – edaphic, meaning the soil is a greater influence on the plants than the climate, and mesophytic meaning a medium moisture level.

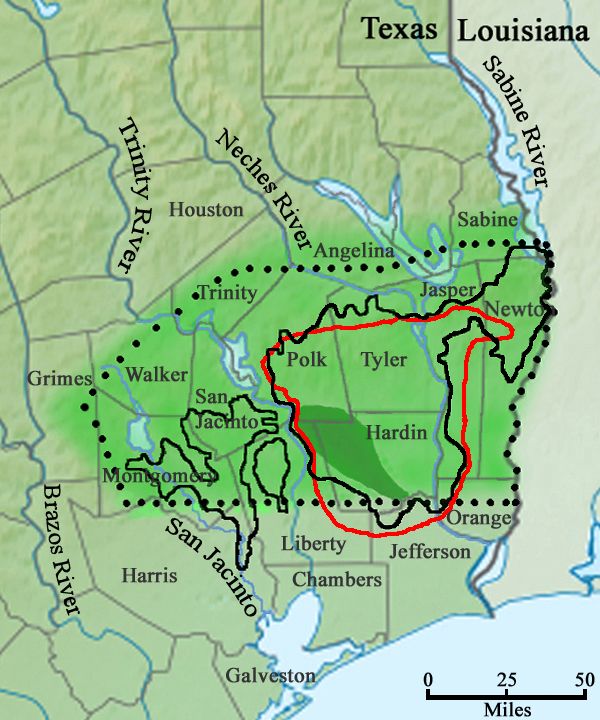
Texas county map with five interpretations of the Big Thicket: *Dark green area = Traditional "Hunter's Thicket" *Light green area = Biological survey *Solid black line = Ecological analysis *Dotted black line = Primitive Big Thicket Region *Solid red line = Big Thicket Basin, geological/ecological analysis

Topography: The Big Thicket Basin has been described as shallow bowl or dish, tilted to one side, with the high rim on the interior north and low rim on the coastal south. Eastern and western rims consist of the low ridges that divide the Neches River and Sabine River drainage on the east and the Neches River and Trinity River drainage on the west. Elevations range from about 350 feet (110 m) in the north to 25–35 feet (8–11 m) in the south, dropping as low as 3 feet (1 m) at confluence of the Neches River and Pine Island Bayou. Northern regions are characterized by low gently rolling hills and well-formed drainage systems of streams and creeks in the landscape. The southern regions are comparatively flat, with poor drainage and support moderately extensive wetlands.

Hydrology: Hardin, Tyler, western Jasper and southeast Polk counties are drained by the Neches River and its tributaries: Village Creek and its smaller tributaries (Beach, Theuvenins, Turkey, Hickory, Kimball, Big Sandy, and Cypress creeks) in the north; Pine Island Bayou and its smaller tributaries (Little Pine Island Bayou and Mayhaw Bayou) in the south. Eastern regions, including eastern Jasper and Newton counties, are drained by several relatively short creeks running into the Sabine River. Western regions including central Liberty, northeastern San Jacinto, northern Walker counties and southwest Polk County (via Kickapoo, Long King, and Menard creeks) are drained by the Trinity River. Areas farther west are drained by the San Jacinto River, with east and west forks. Additional wetlands are extensive, including innumerable nameless swamps, cypress sloughs, oxbow lakes, wetland savannas, and baygall bogs. Floodplains and bottomlands in the south, can retain surface water for days and weeks after rain. The Sabine and Neches rivers flow into Sabine Lake, a natural occurring brackish water estuary, just southeast of the Big Thicket. The other large lakes in the region were constructed in the decades following the Second World War, including B.A. Steinhagen Lake (1947–53) and Sam Rayburn Reservoir (1956–65) on the Neches River drainage, Lake Livingston (1966–69) on the Trinity River, Lake Houston (1953) and Lake Conroe (1970–73) on the San Jacinto River.

Climate: The proximity to the Gulf of Mexico gives the region a climate of mild winters, hot summers, and high humidity most of the year. Average precipitation is 55 inches (1,400 mm) a year, with northern areas receiving about 50 inches (1,300 mm), and southern areas receiving about 60 inches (1,500 mm). However, tropical storms and hurricanes can increase annual rainfall to over 100 inches (2,500 mm). Humidity stays well above 60% most of the time and exceeds 90% often. Winters are mild, with nighttime lows averaging 38–48 °F (3–9 °C) and daytime highs 55–65 °F (13–18 °C). Winter cold fronts can drop temperatures to freezing, but freezes rarely last for more than a few days, sometimes only hours, averaging about 20 mostly nonconsecutive days each year. Snow is rare, occurring only once every ten years or so. Summer temperatures are hot, with nighttime lows averaging 69–72 °F (21–22 °C) and daytime highs averaging 89–94 °F (32–34 °C). Temperatures exceed 90 °F (32 °C) about 110 days each year and days with temperatures above 95 °F (35 °C) and even above 100 °F (38 °C) are not uncommon. The high summer temperatures with high humidity levels can produce very high heat index numbers.

=== Human geography ===
Population: In 2010, the United States Census Bureau reported a population of 54,635 for Hardin County, with an average of 61.3 inhabitants per square mile (23.7/km^{2}) in a county of 890.5 square miles (2,306 km^{2}). The larger towns (and populations from 2010 census) in Hardin County are Kountze, the county seat (2,123), Lumberton (12,448), Silsbee (6,611), and Sour Lake (1,813). Smaller unincorporated communities in the Hardin County include Batson, Honey Island, Saratoga, Thicket, Village Mills, and Votaw.

Tyler County had a total population of 21,766, with an average population of 23.5 inhabitants per square mile (9.1/km^{2}) in 924.5 square miles (2,394 km^{2}). The larger towns in Tyler County are Chester (312), Colmesneil (596), Warren (757), and Woodville, the county seat (2,586) with smaller unincorporated communities including Doucette, Fred, Rockland, and Spurger.

Polk County had a total population of 45,413, with an average of 43 inhabitants per square mile (17/km^{2}) in an area of 1,057.1 square miles (2,738 km^{2}) in 2010 including Livingston (5,335), the county seat and the largest town in the county.

Larger towns and cities in the greater region include Beaumont, Jefferson County, located at the southeast corner of the Big Thicket area with a population of 118,296 and Liberty, Liberty County (8,397), on the southern edge of the Big Thicket area. Houston, Harris County, with a population of 2,320,268 (greater metropolitan area over 7,000,000) is one of the largest metropolitan areas in the US with its central, downtown area located 75 miles (121 km) by air southwest of the town of Kountze, Hardin County.

Economy: Timber, oil and gas, and agriculture continue to be significant to the economy of the area. Many people commute to work in oil refineries and related industries in the Beaumont area. Other sources list industries providing significant employment in Hardin County as: educational, health and social services, construction, recreation, accommodation and food services, finance, insurance, real estate, and rental and leasing.

== Biology ==
It is my observation that the Thicket communicates best with solitary wanderers, but it also speaks to companionable spirits. An important trick on the trail is to shift one's focus from the big scene to the minuscule. Take your time, folks. The Big Thicket is not a hurry-place.

— Maxine Johnston, Foreword in Nature Lover's Guide to the Big Thicket

=== Ecosystems ===
On a larger scale of ecoregions of the United States, the Big Thicket is part of the Piney Woods. The Big Thicket is located in the southwest of the Piney Woods and transitions into the Western Gulf coastal grasslands immediately to the south. To the west are the Texas Blackland Prairies and East Central Texas forests (a.k.a. post-oak savanna). Within the Big Thicket, a major component in the high diversity of plants and animals is the variety of ecosystems present in a relatively small area. The National Park Service identifies eight plant communities in Big Thicket National Preserve. Some biologist and plant ecologists identify as many as nine, ten, or eleven ecosystems in the Big Thicket. In nature these ecosystems are not always found in pure, large tracts of land, and often occur in intertwined and checkerboard mixes and ecotones, transitioning into one another. Ecosystems do not have universal standardized names. Many ecologist, botanist, zoologist and others have studied and classified ecosystems in the Big Thicket region (and elsewhere), defining and naming these communities as relevant to their own disciplines and studies. Although the exact names, definitions, and boundaries might vary (subdivided, compounded, or overlapping), below are summaries of ten major ecosystems recognized by most who have studied and written about the Big Thicket, starting with higher elevations in the north, and in a generalized way, moving to lower elevations in the south.

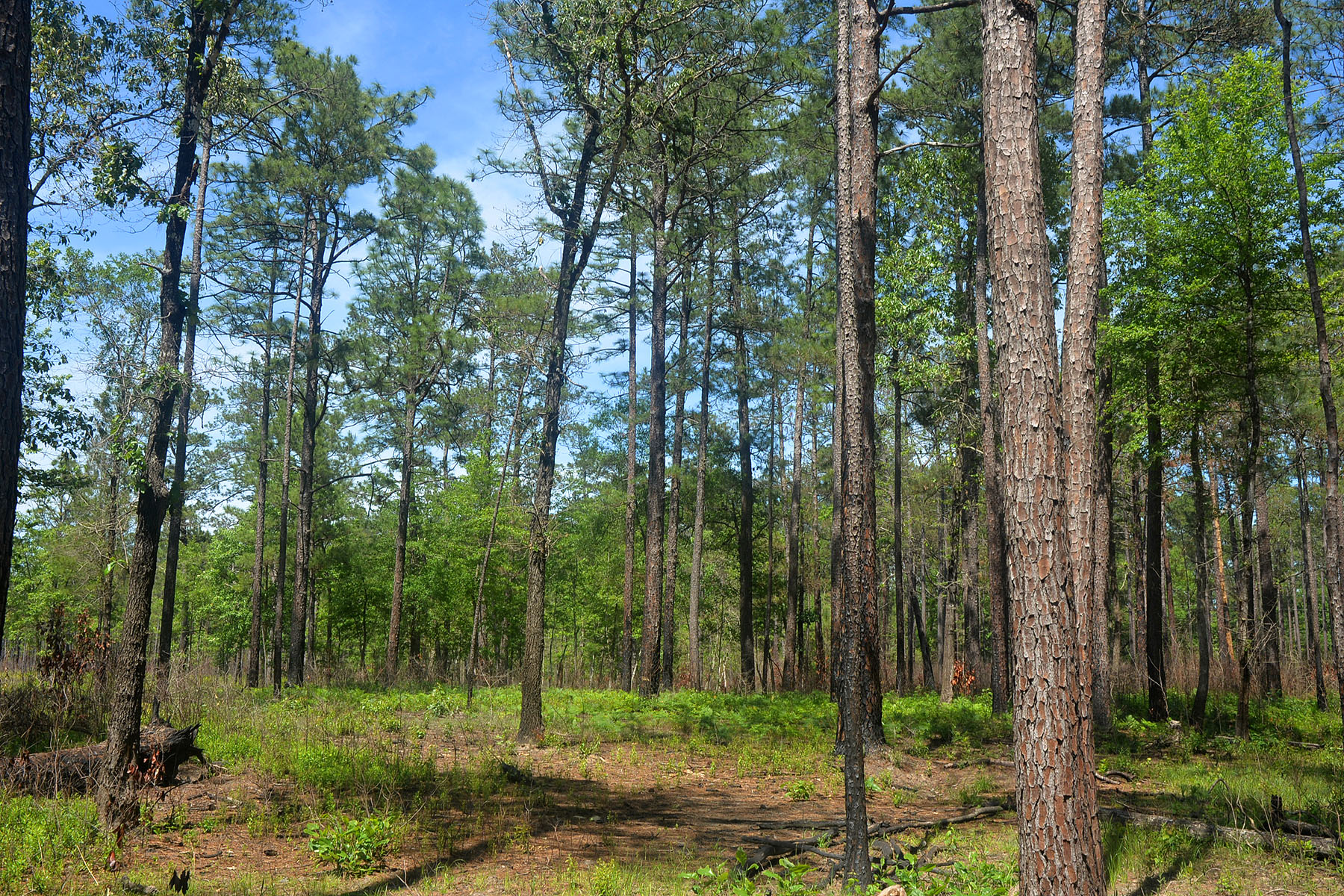
Longleaf pine upland habitat. Big Thicket National Preserve, Turkey Creek Unit, Tyler Co. Texas; 1 May 2020

Uplands (aka: longleaf pine-bluestem uplands; dry upland forests; longleaf pine uplands) In its natural state, this ecosystem is often described as having a park-like appearance, with widely spaced pine and oak trees, and grasses growing in the partially shaded open areas. Longleaf pine-bluestem grass uplands are most extensive in northern areas, on higher elevation plateaus between streams and dry upper slopes, where the soils of the Catahoula, Fleming, Willis, and Bentley formations often have several feet of moderately coarse sand over an iron oxide clay or plinthite hardpan stratum. The permeable sands and topography provide good drainage in the uplands which are relatively dry. Smaller fragments of this type are also found throughout the south where higher ridges, hills, and knolls occur. Longleaf pine (Pinus palustris) is a common species in this ecosystem and one of the dominant trees along with shortleaf pine (Pinus echinata) and a variety of oaks (Quercus). Understory shrubs include flowering dogwood (Cornus florida) and American holly (Ilex opaca). Plant ecologist Geraldine Watson stated the U.S. Forest Service grass herbarium in Louisiana has over 200 species of grasses from this range and various bluestem grasses (Andropogon) are the dominant ground cover. Wildflowers like purple pleat-leaf (Alophia drummondii) and bird-foot violet (Viola pedata) grow in the lighter, semi-shaded areas, while Texas Dutchman's-pipe (Aristolochia reticulata) and false foxglove (Aureolaria grandiflora) grow in the deeper shade. Streams flowing through these areas can support large stands of southern bracken fern (Pteridium aquilinum). Longleaf pine, bluestem grass, and many other plants in these areas are pyrophytic (adapted and resistant to wildfire), and wildfires are a critical factor in maintaining this ecosystem. Historically, naturally occurring fires would periodically eliminate non-pyrophytic plant species encroaching on this plant community. However, decades of fire suppression has allowed a wide mixture of species to invade and in time has turned many of the upland localities into beech-magnolia-loblolly slope forest or oak-hickory forest. Additionally, many areas clearcut for lumber have been replanted with rows of the faster growing, non-native slash pine (Pinus elliottii) eliminating much of the longleaf pine-bluestem grass uplands from Texas.

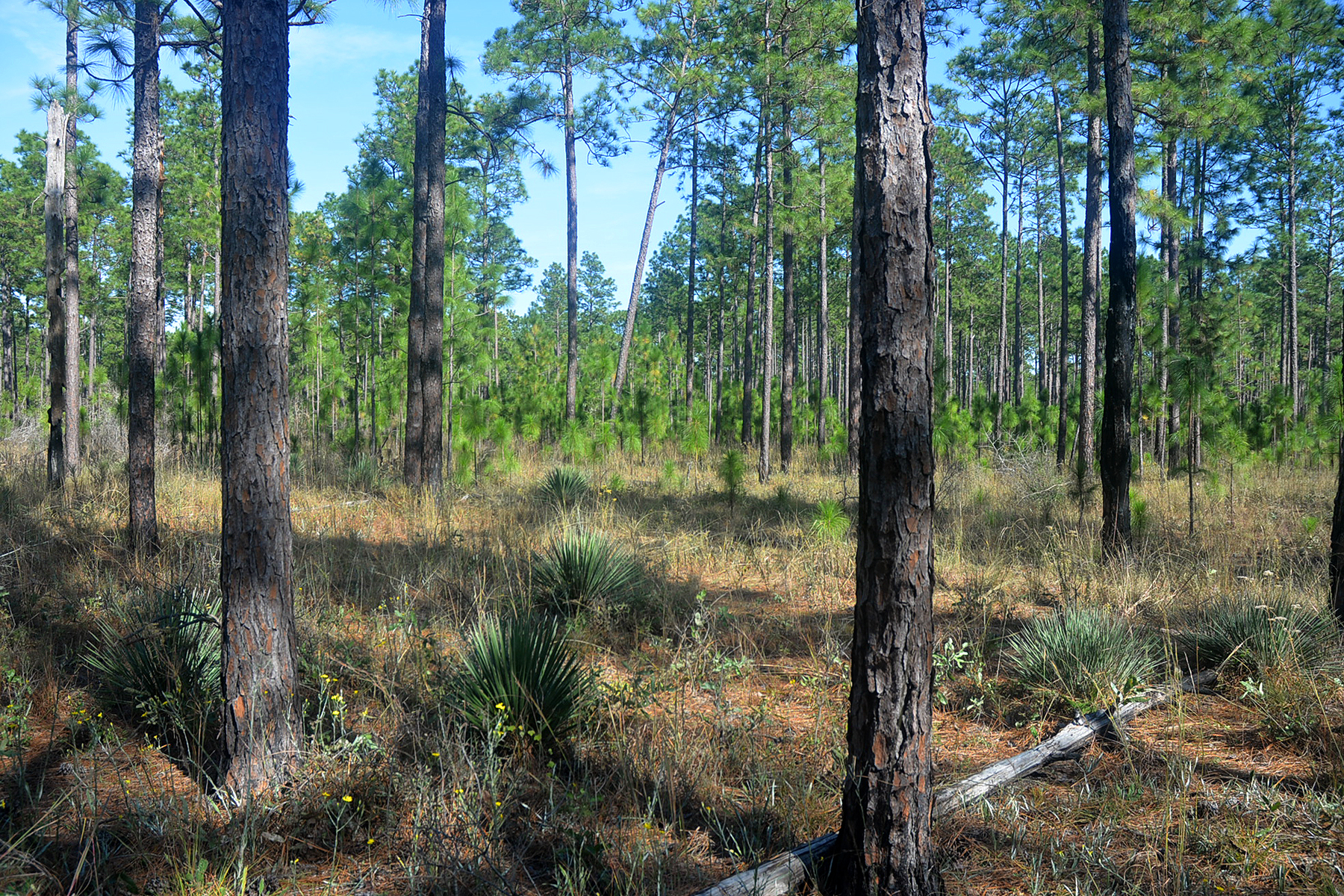
Arid sandyland habitat with longleaf pine trees (Pinus palustris) and Louisiana yucca (Yucca louisianensis) growing among the sparse groundcover. Roy E. Larsen Sandyland Sanctuary, Hardin Co. Texas, USA; 6 November 2019

Sandylands (aka: arid oak-farkleberry sandylands; sand ridge savanna; sandhill pine forests; arid sandylands): Sandylands resemble and have much in common with upland forest, with open grassy areas and widely spaced trees. However, the fundamental difference lies in the soils. These areas reside on deep sand dunes deposited by ancient seas and rivers. In contrast to the uplands where a few feet of coarse sand sits on a hardpan stratum, sandylands sit on layers of fine sand with thin layers of siliceous silt that can be over a hundred feet deep, with little clay and low fertility. Although these areas receive the same rainfall as the rest of the region, water drains quickly in the deep sand which dries in the sun leaving an arid surface. The ground cover can be meager in places with sparse grasses, lichen, or even exposed sand in some spots. Plants adapted to arid environments like Louisiana yucca (Yucca louisianensis) and prairie prickly pear (Opuntia macrorhiza) are conspicuous indicators of sandylands in the humid Big Thicket climate. Although found throughout the region, some of the largest and best examples are in the vicinity of the Neches River and Village Creek. In the more arid sites bluejack oak (Quercus incana), sand post oak (Quercus margaretta), north blackjack oak (Quercus marilandica), post oak (Quercus stellata), black hickory (Carya texana), and mockernut hickory (Carya tomentosa) are dominant hardwoods. With increasing moisture levels longleaf pine (Pinus palustris) and loblolly pine (Pinus taeda) emerge over the oaks. Longleaf pine is characteristic of sandylands, but not always dominant. Farkleberry (Vaccinium arboreum) is the dominant shrub in the understory. Several rare wildflowers with limited distributions in Texas can be found in this environment; examples include Oklahoma prairie clover (Petalostemum griseum), Carolina vervain (Stylodon carneus = Verbena carnea), Hooker palafoxia (Palafoxia hookeriana), green-thread (Thelesperma flavodiscum), and trailing phlox (Phlox nivalis texensis) which is also an endangered species. Like the uplands, periodic wildfires are essential to keeping the understory open and preserving this ecosystem. These areas are said to have been preferred habitation sites for the nomadic Atakapa-Ishak people in Pre-Columbian times.

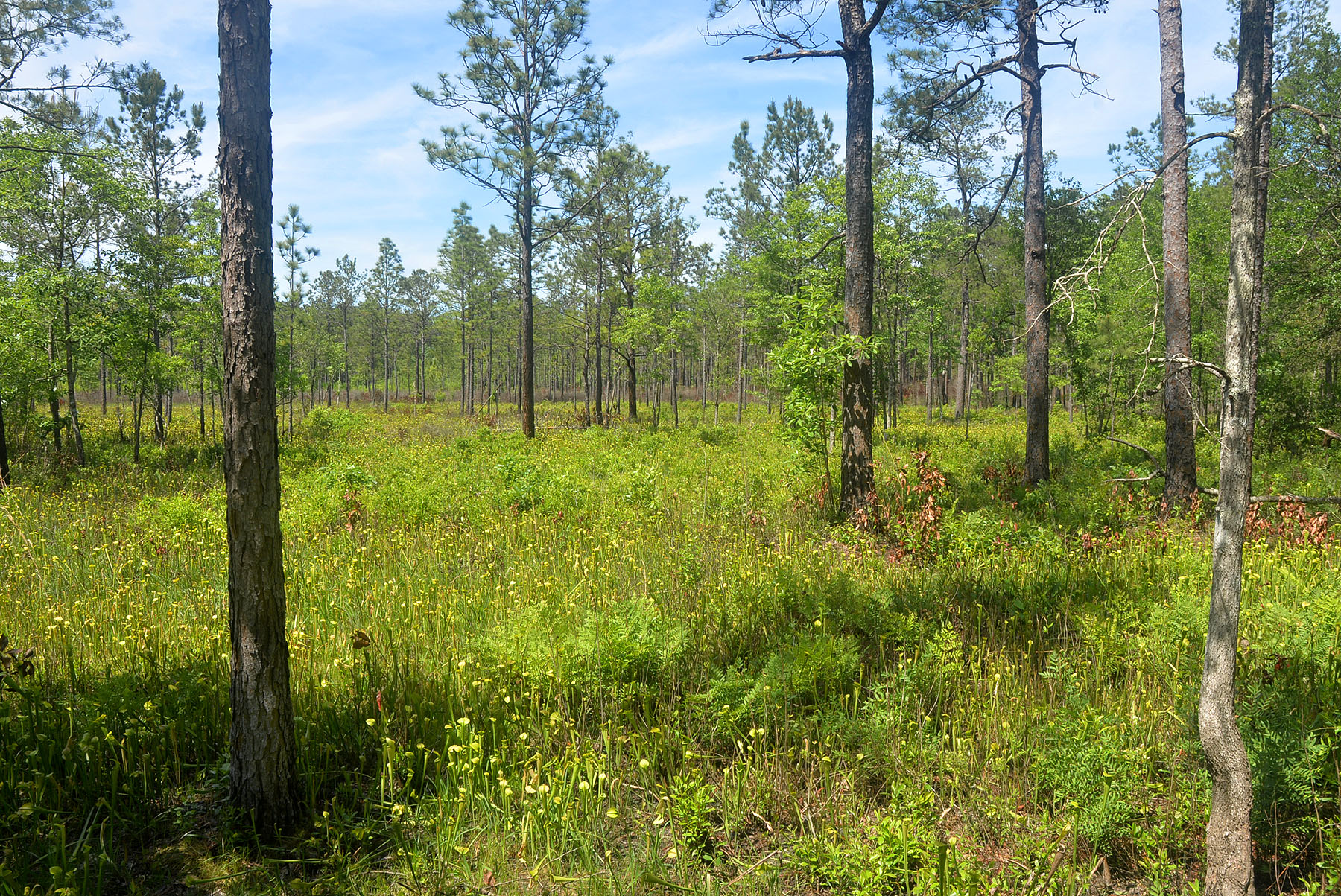
Pine savannah wetland habitat with pitcher plants (Sarracenia alata). Big Thicket National Preserve, Turkey Creek Unit, Tyler Co. Texas; 1 May 2020

Savannas (aka: longleaf - black gum savannahs; wetland longleaf pine savannas; wetland pine savannas; pine savannah wetlands) If the sandylands described above resemble a well drained and arid version of the uplands, the savanna wetlands might be described as a poorly drained, wet version. This ecosystem is characterized by the same open spaces with widely spaced pine trees as uplands and sandylands, but differs in being very flat, with a relatively thin layer of low nutrient, fine, packed sand, sitting on hardpan which is very near the surface. The nearly impervious hardpan both inhibits drainage in wet periods as well as prevents moisture from rising in dry periods. The severity of the fluctuating water table, along with occasional low-intensity ground fires that are necessary to sustain this ecosystem, limit the plants that can grow there. Savanna wetlands are most often found to the south of the uplands, on the Montgomery and recent Bentley formations, although they are not entirely restricted to this zone. Longleaf pine (Pinus palustris) along with black gum (Nyssa sylvatica), often stunted, make up much of the overstory, being among the few trees that grow in the severe conditions. Ground cover is dominated by rushes, sedges (Rhynchospora and Scleria), and grasses including Andropogon, Aristida, Muhlenbergia, and little bluestem (Schizachyrium scoparium). Within the flat savannas, the slightest change in elevation can produce significantly different vegetation. Occasional mounds with two or three feet of sand, support upland habitat, while depressions of just a few inches can hold acid bogs, with low pH levels and low levels of nutrients such as nitrogen, potassium, phosphorus, and calcium. Even the peripheral areas around acid bogs, distinguished by subtle sloping elevations of only an inch or two, sustain a distinct zone of vegetation. Sphagnum mosses and carnivorous plants are adapted to these environments, including the pitcher plant (Sarracenia alata), annual sundew (Drosera brevifolia), rush bladderwort (Utricularia juncea), and small butterwort (Pinguicula pumila). A number of orchids are found in savannas including the grass pink orchid (Calopogon tuberosus), yellow fringed orchid (Platanthera ciliaris), snowy orchid (Platanthera nivea), and snake mouth orchid (Pogonia ophioglossoides).

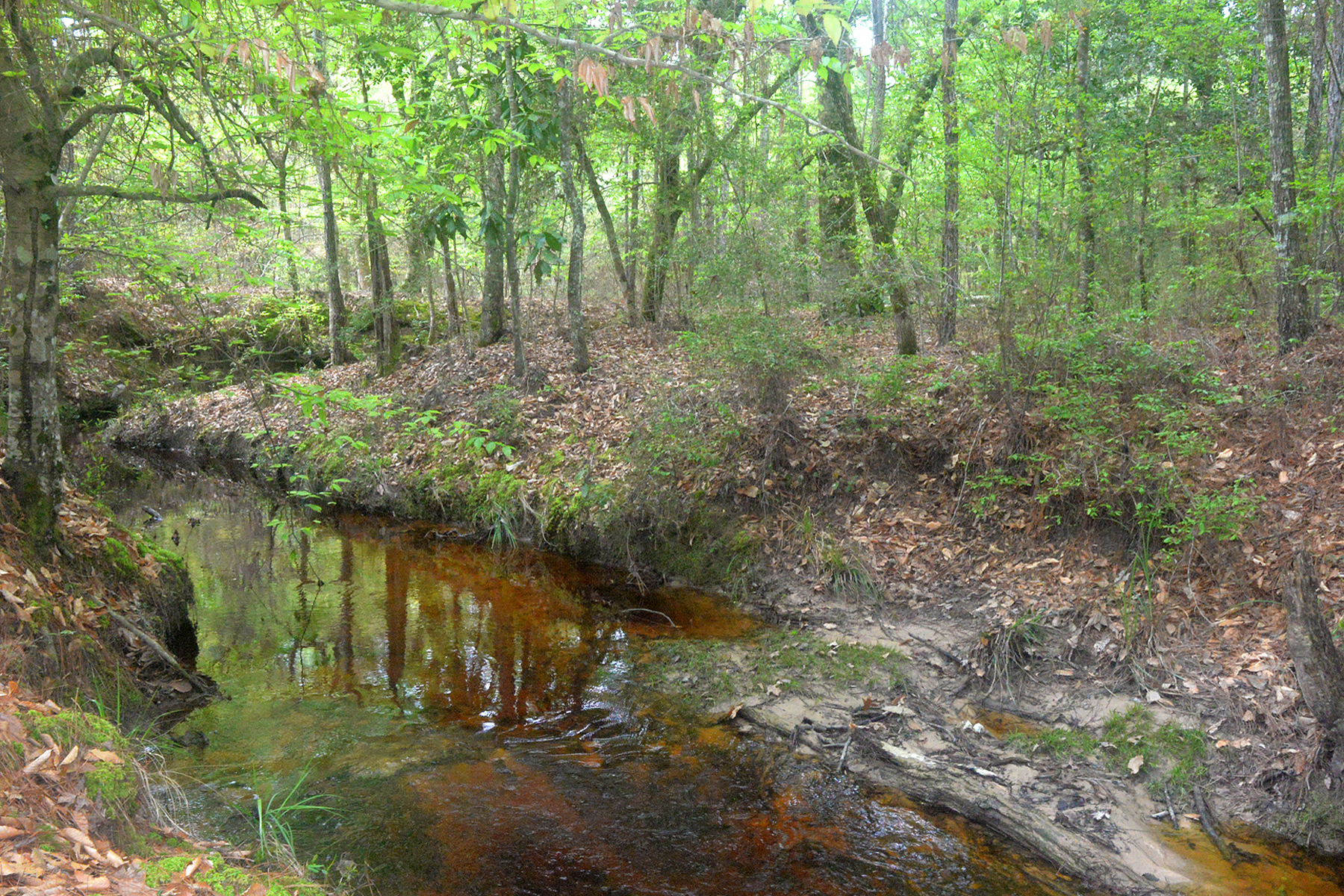
Slope forest with a blackwater stream flowing through mixed deciduous and evergreen woodlands. Big Thicket National Preserve, Big Sandy Creek Unit, Polk Co. Texas; 23 Mar 2020

Slope forests (aka: beech-magnolia-loblolly slopes; mesic upland forests: lower slope hardwood pine forest; beech-magnolia-loblolly pine association): Slope forest have a wide mix of conifers, deciduous, and evergreen broad-leaved trees occupying the gentle slopes between the wet bottomlands and the dryer uplands. Small spring-fed streams drain the slopes before reaching the larger creeks. The closed canopy filters the light reaching the forest floor where an ample layer of leaf litter holds water, creating a mesic understory. The soils are relatively fertile with fine, loamy, sands and are well to moderately drained. The purest examples of slope forest are found on the soils of the Willis Formation with red clay in Jasper, Newton, Polk, and Tyler counties, but they extend well into the lower, southern regions where soils and topography are suitable, particularly along the slopes of the waterways. A variety of trees co-dominate slope forest and these can vary with elevation and moisture. In higher and less humid areas, forest shortleaf pine (Pinus echinata), loblolly pine (Pinus taeda), white oak (Quercus alba), and southern red oak (Quercus falcata) co-dominate, but sweetgum (Liquidambar styraciflua) and blackgum (Nyssa sylvatica) are also common. More humid areas tend to shift to American beech (Fagus grandifolia), southern magnolia (Magnolia grandiflora), and American holly (Ilex opaca) co-dominating with loblolly pine (Pinus taeda), but include a wide variety of other hardwoods such as white oak (Quercus alba) and sugar maple (Acer saccharum). In the lowest, flatter areas of the south, beech trees tend to drop out and are replaced by chestnut oak or basket oak (Quercus michauxii) and laurel oak (Quercus laurifolia). Understory trees and shrubs include Hercules-club or toothache tree (Zanthoxylum clava-herculis), hoary azalea (Rhododendron canescens), redbud (Cercis canadensis), and silver bell (Halesia diptera). A rich diversity of wildflowers are found in slope forest such as three jack-in-the pulpits (Arisaema dracontium, A. quinatum, A. triphyllum), Indian pipe (Monotropa uniflora), and wake-robin (Trillium gracile). Orchids include the yellow lady's-slipper (Cypripedium calceolus), spring coral-root (Corallorhiza wisteriana), whorled pogonia (Isotria verticillata), southern twayblade (Listera australis), crippled crane fly (Tipularia discolor), and three birds (Triphora trianthophora). Wildfires are much less important to the ecology of the humid slope forest than in the uplands and sandylands, both of which will slowly revert into slope forest when fire is suppressed and slope vegetation that is not tolerant of fire takes hold and fills in the open areas.

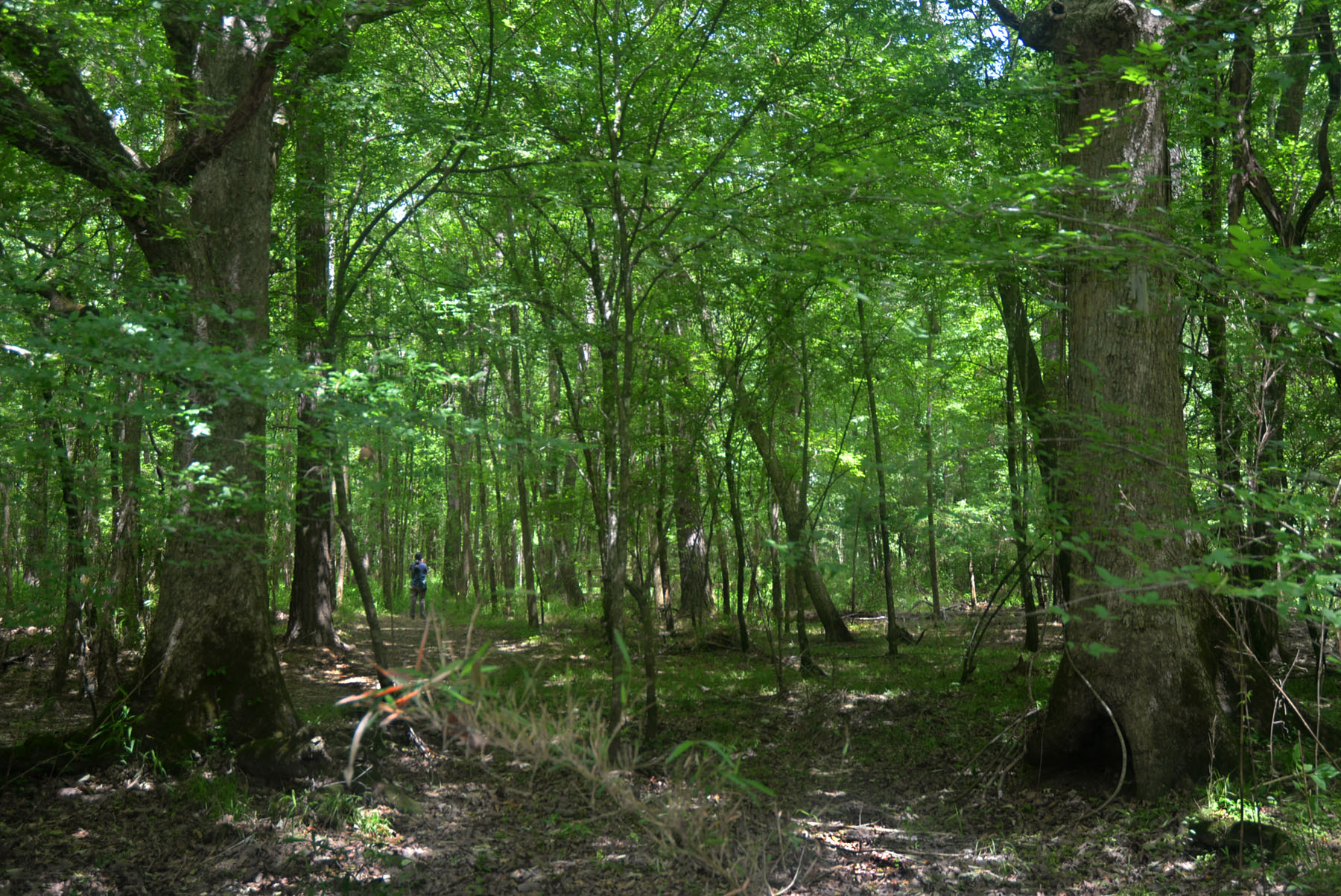
Floodplains are dominated by hardwood trees and pine trees are uncommon or absent. Big Thicket National Preserve, Big Sandy Creek Unit, Polk Co. Texas, USA; 12 May 2020

Floodplains: (aka: sweet gum - oak floodplains; wet forests: floodplain hardwood forest; oak-gum floodplain; stream floodplains): Often referred to as bottomlands, floodplains are low laying areas adjacent to the larger creeks, bayous, and rivers which overflow and flood with some regularity. The floodwaters deposit rich alluvial soils, moderately permeable silty, sandy loams that support a wide diversity of vegetation. The major floodplains in the region were formed during the Wisconsin glaciation, when sea levels were low and great rivers cut deep and wide channels in the landscape. These channels are now largely filled with sediment and deposits through which the present day rives, much smaller than in the past, wind and meander. Floodplains often occur in terraces with various swales, ridges, and levees stepping down in tiers to the water level. Some ecologists subdivide these terraces into separate ecosystems, including but not limited to, baygalls on the outer margins of higher terraces, and cypress sloughs in the lowest areas. Pine trees are uncommon or absent in the floodplains, which are dominated by deciduous canopy trees including water oak (Quercus nigra), chestneu or basket oak (Quercus michauxii), willow oak (Quercus phellos), cherrybark oak (Quercus pagoda), and red oak (Quercus falcata). Other important trees include the overcup oak (Quercus lyrata) which can grow in and around standing water, sweetgum (Liquidambar styraciflua), blackgum (Nyssa sylvatica), water hickory (Carya aquatica), and red maple (Acer rubrum), often with a dense mid-story of ironwood (Carpinus caroliniana). Among the many wildflowers are three irises, yellow iris (Iris pseudacorus), southern iris (Iris virginica), and short-stem iris (Iris brevicaulis), as well as the fragrant ladies tresses orchid (Spiranthes odorata), blue jasmine (Clematis crispa), and the aquatic spatterdock (Nuphar luteum). Although the floodplains in the region share much in common with one another, each river varies with some unique elements and plant species. The Trinity River basin in particular stands out in contrast to others with calcareous, relatively high pH, alkaline soils supporting vegetation that is seldom seen in other watersheds, including bois d'arc also called horse apple (Maclura pomifera), blueberry hawthorn (Crataegus brachyacantha), cedar elm (Ulmus crassifolia), and Texas sugarberry (Celtis laevigata).

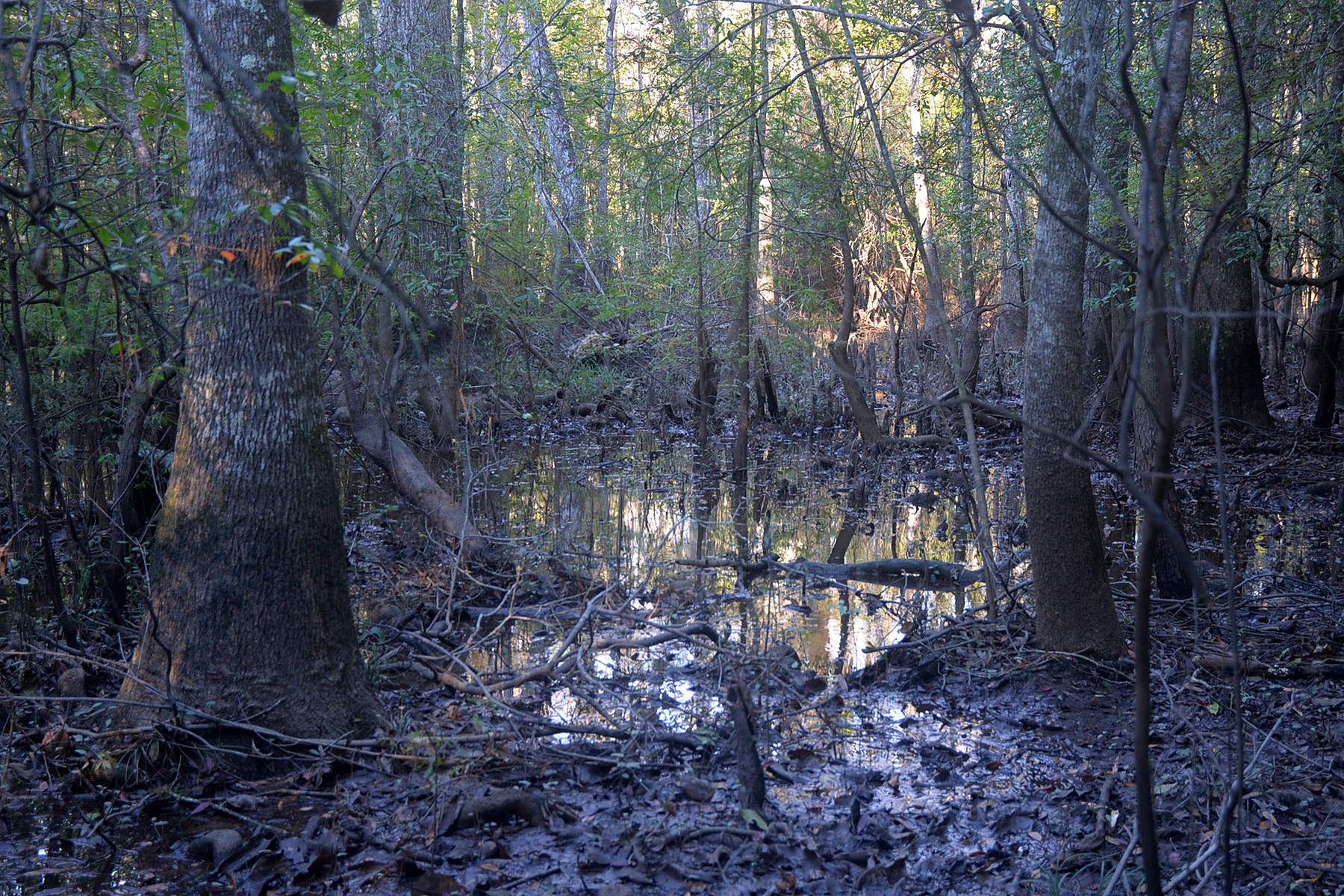
Baygall habitat in the Big Thicket National Preserve, Jack Gore Baygall Unit, Hardin Co. Texas, USA; 6 November 2019

Baygalls (aka: bay-gallberry holly bogs in part; Acid bog baygalls): With dense undergrowth and twisted vines growing in stagnant, blackwater, acid bogs, under a shadowy canopy of swamp tupelo and cypress, baygalls are often said to exemplify and epitomize the Big Thicket. Baygalls typically form at the base of slopes where seeps, springs, and rainwater drain onto the margins of the flat floodplains and bottomlands, away from the main channels. The drainage from the slopes maintain saturated, muddy soils in these already damp and humid areas, where pools, bogs, and stagnant drainages form in depressions on the flat landscape. With sphagnum mosses and high peat content, baygall soils and water have very high acidity, pH levels of 4.5 are common. The high acid levels are a significant factor in distinguishing baygalls from the floodplain and flats ecosystems. Although baygall waters are generally shallow and torpid, they sometimes form small, highly acidic blackwater streams, slowly moving into the larger creeks and bayous. Hanging bogs occur where water pools on irregular flat and low areas on the slopes above the bottomlands. The name baygall is derived from sweetbay magnolia (Magnolia virginiana) and sweet gallberry holly (Ilex coriacea). These and swamp titi (Cyrilla racemiflora) are dominant and other common shrubs include southern bayberry (Myrica cerifera), water willow (Decodon verticillatus), red bay (Persea borbonia), and Virginia sweetspire (Itea virginica). Vines like muscadine grape (Vitis rotundifolia), supplejack or rattan-vine (Berchemia scandens) can grow impressively large. Larger trees include swamp tupelo (Nyssa biflora) and bald cypress (Taxodium distichum). In addition to the prominent fragrant water-lily (Nymphaea odorata), baygalls harbor many small and obscure wildflowers such as four species of carnivorous bladderworts (Utricularia), and saprophytic species like burmannia (Burmannia biflora) and nodding-nixie (Apteria aphylla). Some baygalls and hanging bogs are no more than a small pool, while others can be a mile across. One author states that the Jack Gore Baygall Unit of the BTNP, at 12 sq mi (31 km^{2}), is the largest baygall in the world.

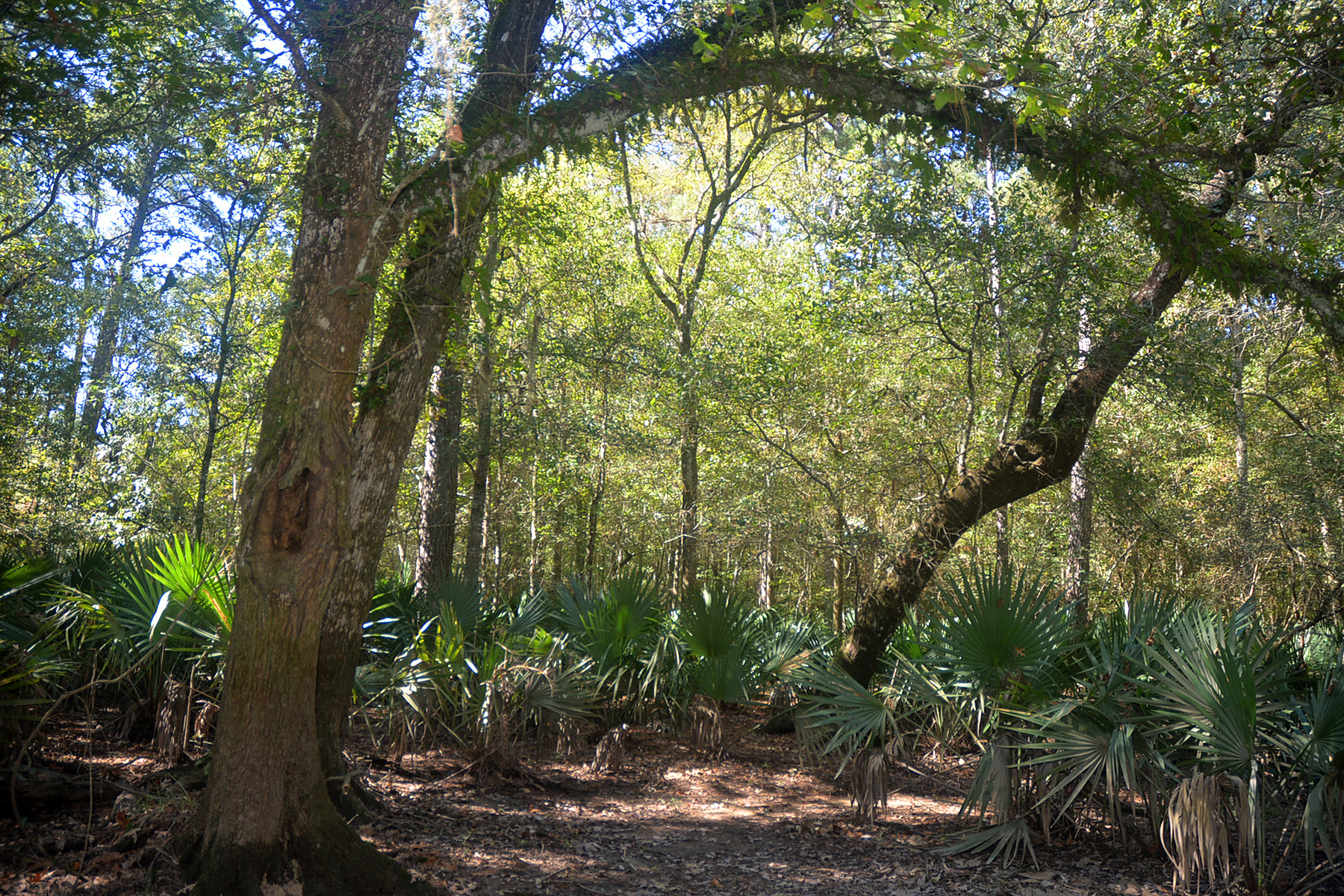
Palmetto-oak and hardwood flats habitat with dwarf palmettos (Sabal minor) and resurrection fern (Pleopeltis polypodioides) growing on tree limb at the top of photo. Big Thicket National Preserve, Lance Rosier Unit, Hardin Co. Texas, USA: 23 October 2019

Flats (aka: palmetto-oak flats; wet forests; palmetto-hardwood flats): Dense stands of dwarf palmettos (Sabal minor) are an indicator of this ecosystem and it can have an exotic and tropical look with epiphytes draping from the trees, like Spanish moss (Tillandsia usneoides) and resurrection fern (Pleopeltis polypodioides). Some of the most extensive and well preserved palmetto-oak flats are found around Pine Island Bayou and Little Pine Island Bayou, the area known as the "Traditional Thicket" or "Hunter's Thicket". Flats, often several miles wide, are old river channels and floodplains and their associated bars and levees, filled with centuries of sediments and alluvium deposits. They are some of the flattest and lowest areas in the Big Thicket. Flats are typically poorly drained areas with very deep calcareous soils of a high clay content having vertisols properties, meaning the soil moves, shrinking and swelling with moisture content. Palmetto-oak flats alternate between flooded and dry conditions, with a few inches of water standing for days, weeks, even months after rains, to dry periods in which the soils dry, leaving large and deep cracks in the hard baked surface. The canopy is made up of several hardwoods species of which the swamp chestnut oak or basket oak (Quercus michauxii), laurel oak (Quercus laurifolia), overcup oak (Quercus lyrata), swamp post oak (Quercus similis), and cedar elm (Ulmus crassifolia) are dominant species. Other trees and shrubs filling in the canopy and understory include sweetgum (Liquidambar styraciflua), Carolina ash (Fraxinus caroliniana), blueberry hawthorn (Crataegus brachiacanthua), and arrowwood viburnum (Viburnum dentatum). The shade of the canopy and the severity of the wet and dry conditions limit the species that grow in the understory. However the dwarf palmetto (Sabal minor) thrives, typically growing to about 4 feet (1.2 m), although occasional specimens can be found up to 10 to 15 feet (3.0 to 4.6 m) tall. Some regard the larger specimens as a different species or variety, the Louisiana palmetto (Sabal louisiana), others do not recognize it a valid species. Other understory species found on the flats are creeping spot-flower (Spilanthes americana), Missouri ironweed (Vernonia missurica), lance-leaved water-willow (Justicia lanceolata), and inland sea oats (Chasmanthium latifolium). The ancient levees and bars deposited along the old river channels, varying in size from less than an acre up to 10 acres (4.0 ha), are slightly higher with better drainage supporting stands of loblolly pine (Pinus taeda) and water oak (Quercus nigra) with understory species such as Hooker eryngo (Eryngium hookeri), and sharp-sepal penstemon (Penstemon tenuis). Bald cypress (Taxodium distichum) and water tupelo (Nyssa aquatica) grow in and near permanent or semi permanent water and the disc water-hyssop (Bacopa rotundifolia) may be found floating or growing at the water's edge. Drainage patterns are significant in shaping and maintaining these ecosystems and drainage alterations have reduced the historical size of this community.

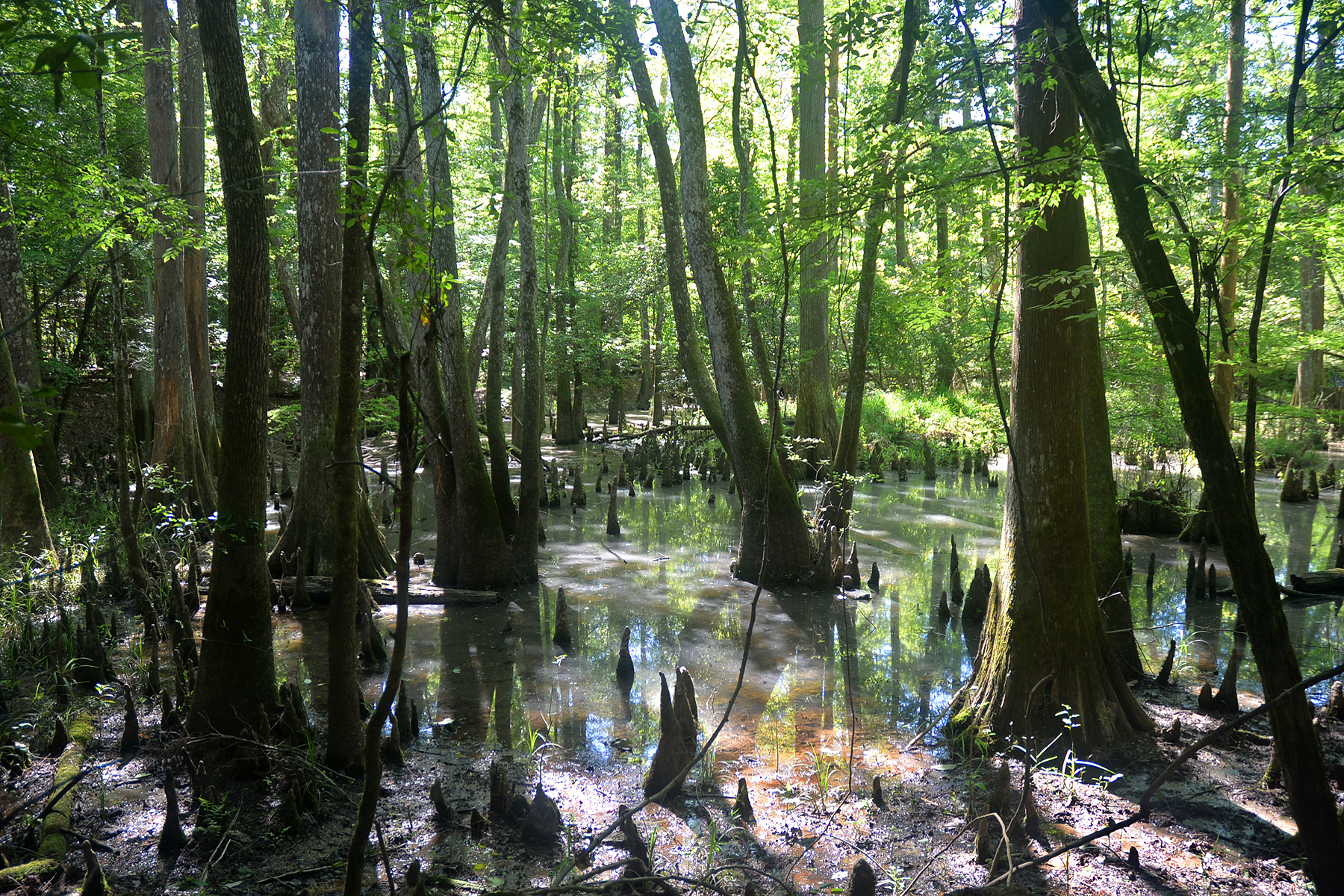
Cypress slough habitat. Big Thicket National Preserve, Turkey Creek Unit, Hardin Co. Texas; 16 April 2020

Cypress slough (aka: sweet gum - oak floodplains in part; swamp-cypress tupelo forest; slough, oxbows, and cypress-tupelo swamps): Recognized as a distinct ecosystem by some, regarded as a component found within the flats, floodplains, and baygall bogs by others, cypress sloughs with older bald cypress (Taxodium distichum) and their buttresses and protruding knees are impressive environments. Cypress sloughs occupy low laying areas in the floodplains of creeks and rivers set back from the main channels, with still or very slow moving permanent, or semi permanent, water, like secondary channels, ox-bow lakes, sloughs, and ponds. Cypress sloughs are found throughout the region but, are perhaps more extensive in the low laying south. The dominant trees are the bald cypress (Taxodium distichum) and the water tupelo (Nyssa aquatica). Water tupelo often grow in deeper water and bald cypress in shallower parts or at the periphery, although both are adapted to growing in permanently submerged areas or on dry land with sufficient moisture. Understory trees and shrubs found growing around cypress sloughs include water or Carolina ash (Fraxinus caroliniana), water elm (Planera aquatica), river birch (Betula nigra), eastern hop-hornbean (Ostrya virginiana), and buttonbush (Cephalanthus occidentalis). Plants like lizard's tail (Saururus cernuus) and burhead (Echinodorus cordifolius) can be seen growing in shallow water with cardinal flower (Lobelia cardinalis) and sensitive fern (Onoclea sensibilis) at the water's edge. Bald cypress trees typically live for 600 years or more and some are known to have lived 1,200 years. Cypress is a valuable hardwood, particularly prized for its resistance to rot and highly valued for shipbuilding, docks, and bridges. Consequently, this ancient swamp forest, once common in the region, have been greatly reduced because of logging in the nineteenth century. Trees over 100 years old are rare in the area now.

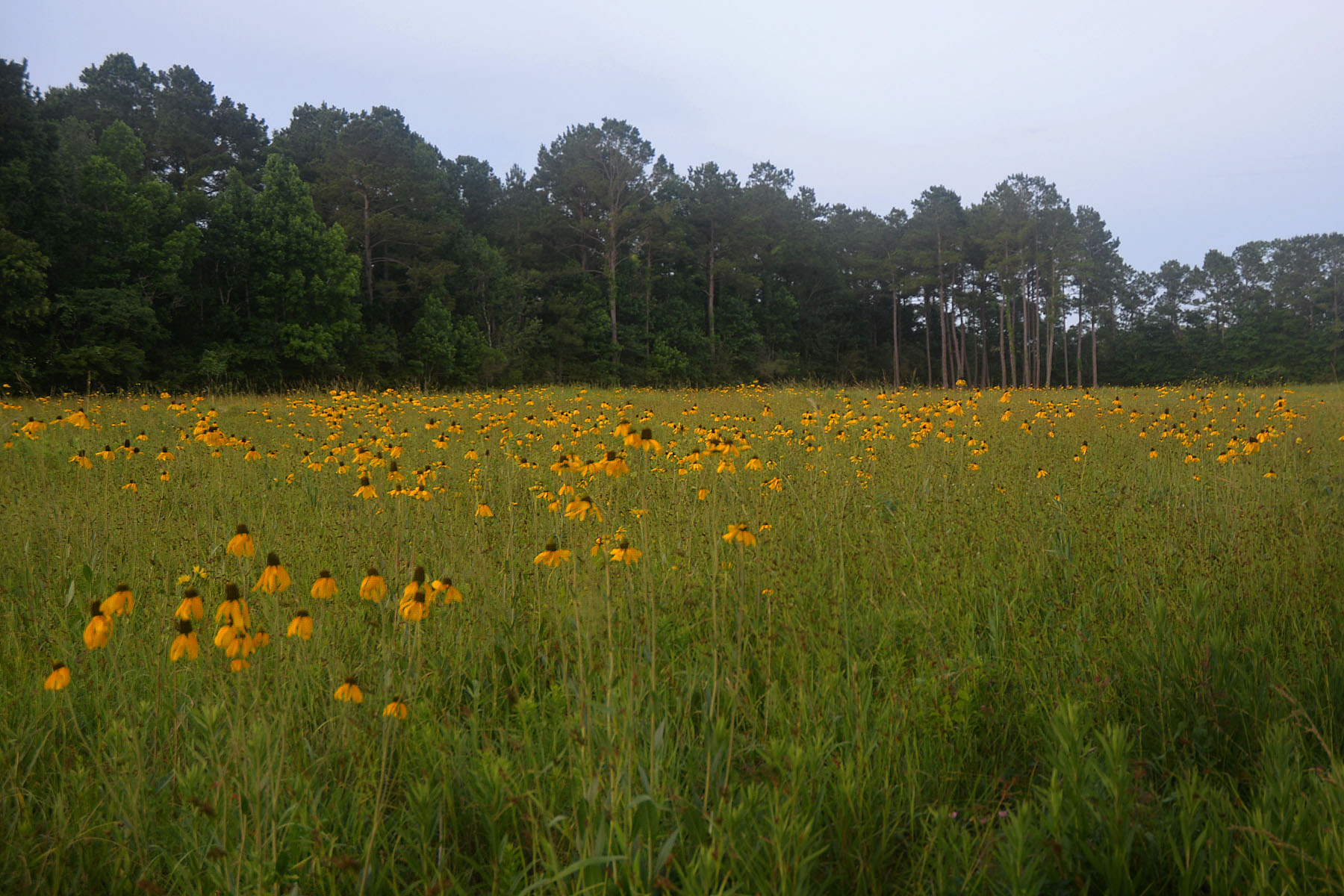
Marysee Prairie Preserve in the Big Thicket region of southeast Texas. Liberty Co. Texas; 22 May 2020

Mixed-grass prairies: Prairies (small patches are sometimes called coves), are sometimes included as a Big Thicket ecosystem. These are isolated fragments of coastal prairie more typical of Chambers and Jefferson counties to the south, in areas mostly found where the forest and coastal prairies transition. Prairies are dominated by grasses and herbaceous plants, some are the same as those found longleaf pine savannas, but others are distinctive like Indian grass (Sorghastrum nutans) and prairie bluebell (Eustoma grandiflorum). Common grasses of these areas include Indian grass (Sorghastrum avenaceum), eastern gama-grass (Tripsacum dactyloides), and tall dropseed (Sporobolus asper). One author distinguished prairies from longleaf pine savannas by the presence of pimple mounds or mima mounds. Prairies and coves were once found in the Big Thicket with some consistency, particularly in higher elevations in the south, and specifically in higher southwestern areas between the Pine Island Bayou and the Trinity River drainages. However, natural wildfires are an important factor in maintaining these areas and when fire is suppressed, trees and shrubs quickly grow in and fill in these areas. The Chinese tallow tree (Triadica sebifera) is a particularly aggressive and problematic invasive species in prairie habitat in the region. Prairies are also often the first areas to be developed for farming and residential housing. Unfortunately, prairies in the Big Thicket are now rare.

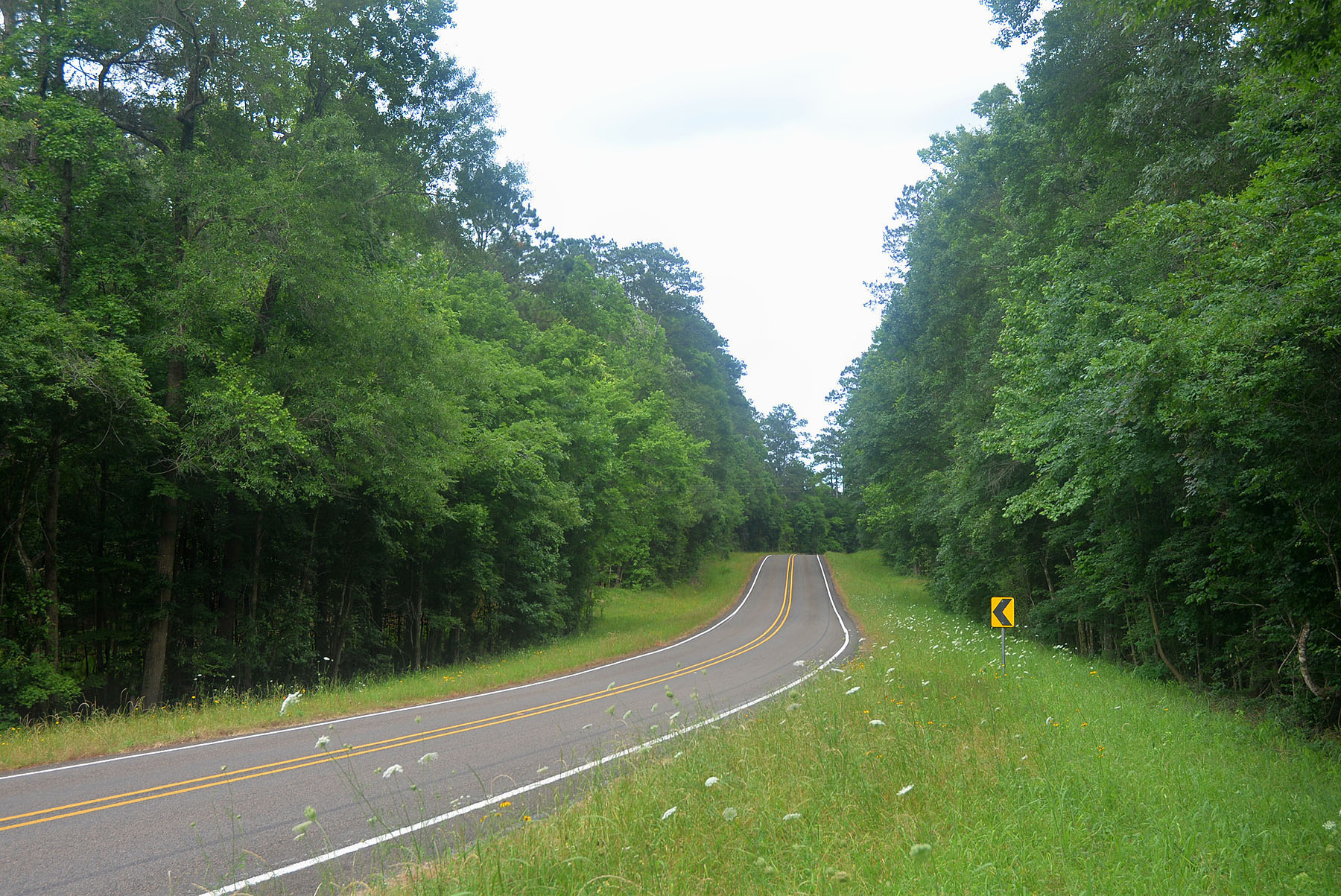
Texas Farm to Market Road 1276 in the Big Thicket National Preserve, Big Sandy Creek Unit, Polk County, Texas; 12 May 2020

Roadsides and river edge: Although not a natural or even stable plant assemblage, some have recognized roadsides as an ecosystem in the Big Thicket. Proponents of the concept have identified a number of distinguishing characteristics of roadsides from the other ecosystems. Sunlight and heat can reach the ground along the clear highway easements, unlike most areas where the light is filtered by the forest canopy before it reaches the ground. Roadsides receive more rainwater, diverted from the pavement and often retained for a time in roadside ditches. Soil types not normally found at the surface are often exposed with the construction of roads, particularly deep road cuts in the low hills in the north that expose calcareous soils or where the formations are thin near transition zones supporting the growth of plants not normally occurring in the surrounding habitat, allowing for more diverse plants species to grow. The "corridor effect" of traffic, both human (vehicles, tourists, and road crews) and birds and other animals, inadvertently dispersing seeds and roots along roadsides from other areas. And finally, regular cycles of mowing and cutting, as well as the use of herbicides can both inhibit and benefit various wildflowers and plant species growing there. Most plant species at any given roadside represent the association immediately adjacent to that locality, but often have a few odd of species from other areas. Roadsides are a convenient and accessible places to view wildflowers, regardless of whether they are true ecosystems. In the past some (including the National Park Service) have discussed the river edge as an ecosystem in the Big Thicket however, most ecologist do not recognize river edges as an ecosystem distinct from the one a river runs through.

Big Thicket gallery

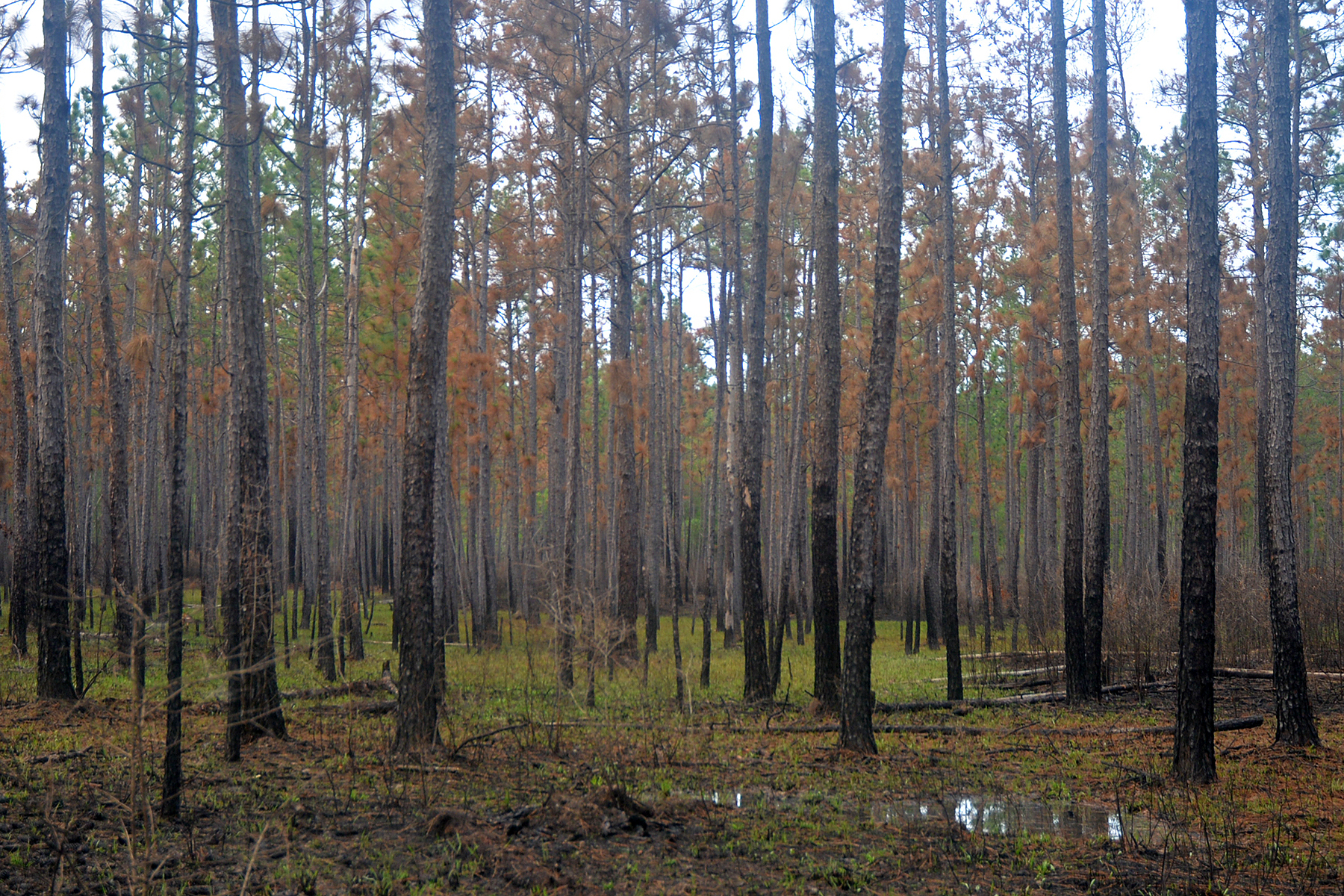
Longleaf pine (Pinus palustris) upland habitat after a recent fire. Big Thicket National Preserve, Hickory Creek Unit, Tyler Co. Texas; 23 Mar 2020

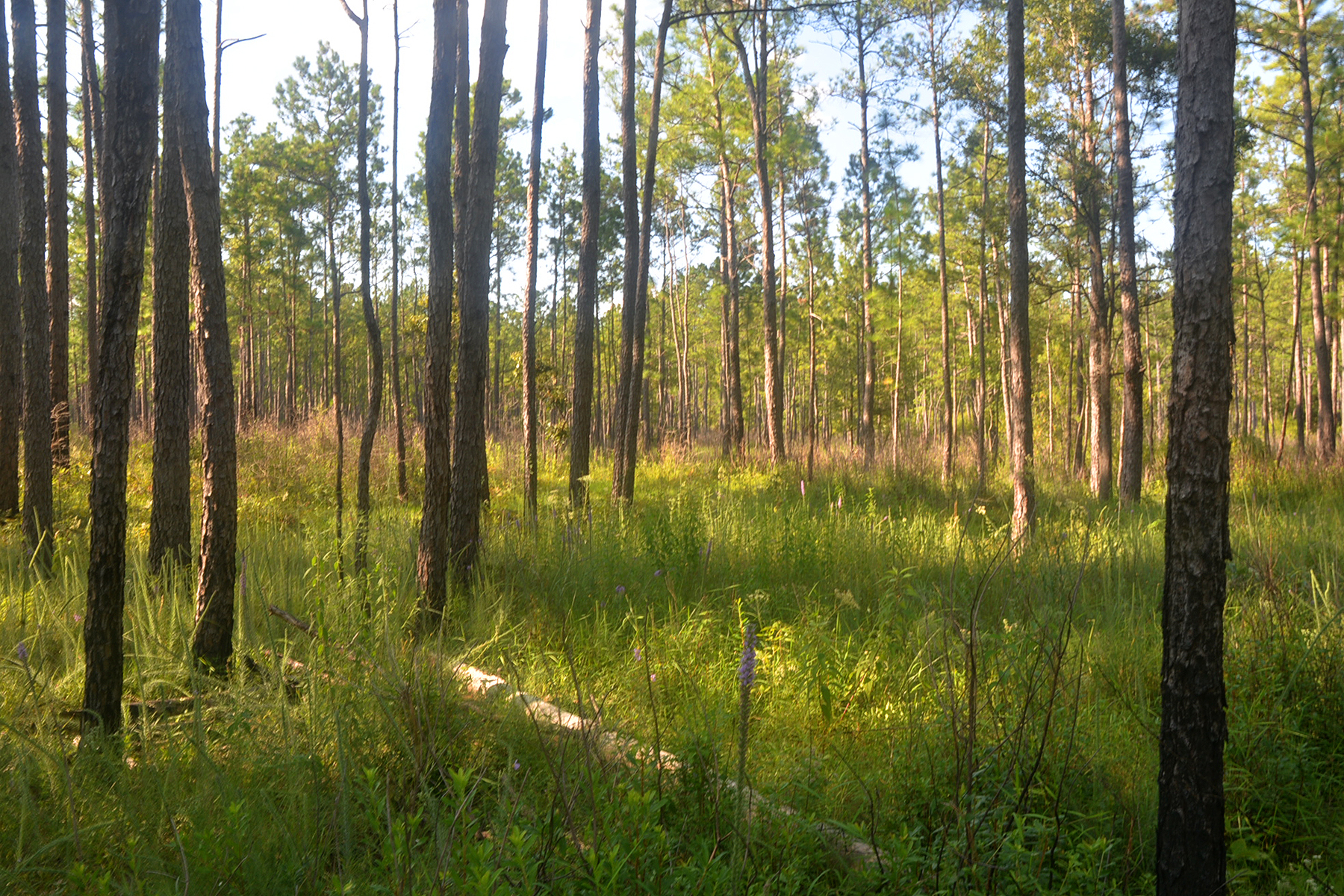
The same vicinity as previous image five months after the fire. Big Thicket National Preserve, Hickory Creek Savannah Unit, Tyler Co. Texas; 20 Aug 2020

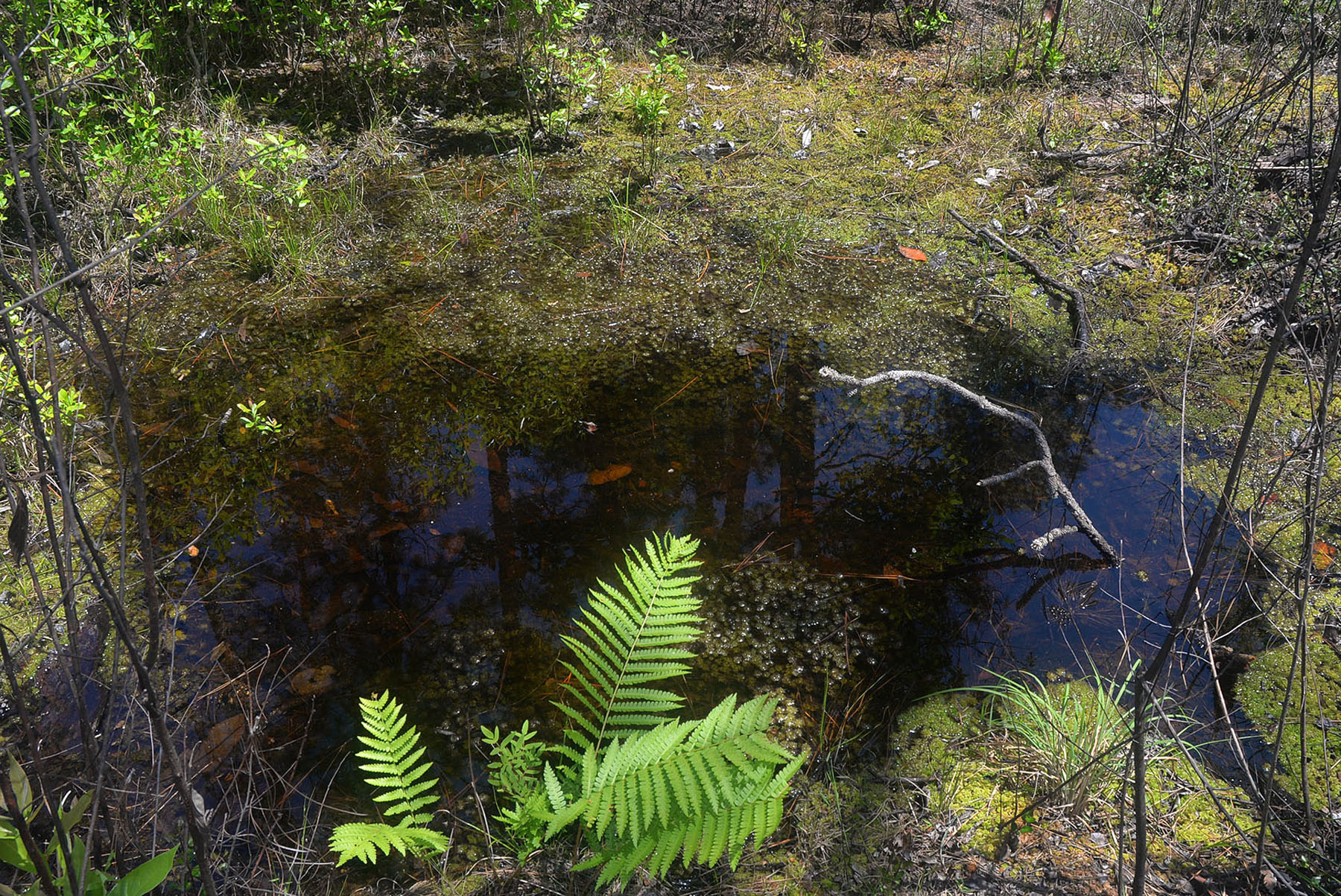
Sphagnum bogs or "acid bogs" with pH levels as low as 4.5 occur in the region. Big Thicket National Preserve, Turkey Creek Unit, Tyler Co. Texas; 1 May 2020

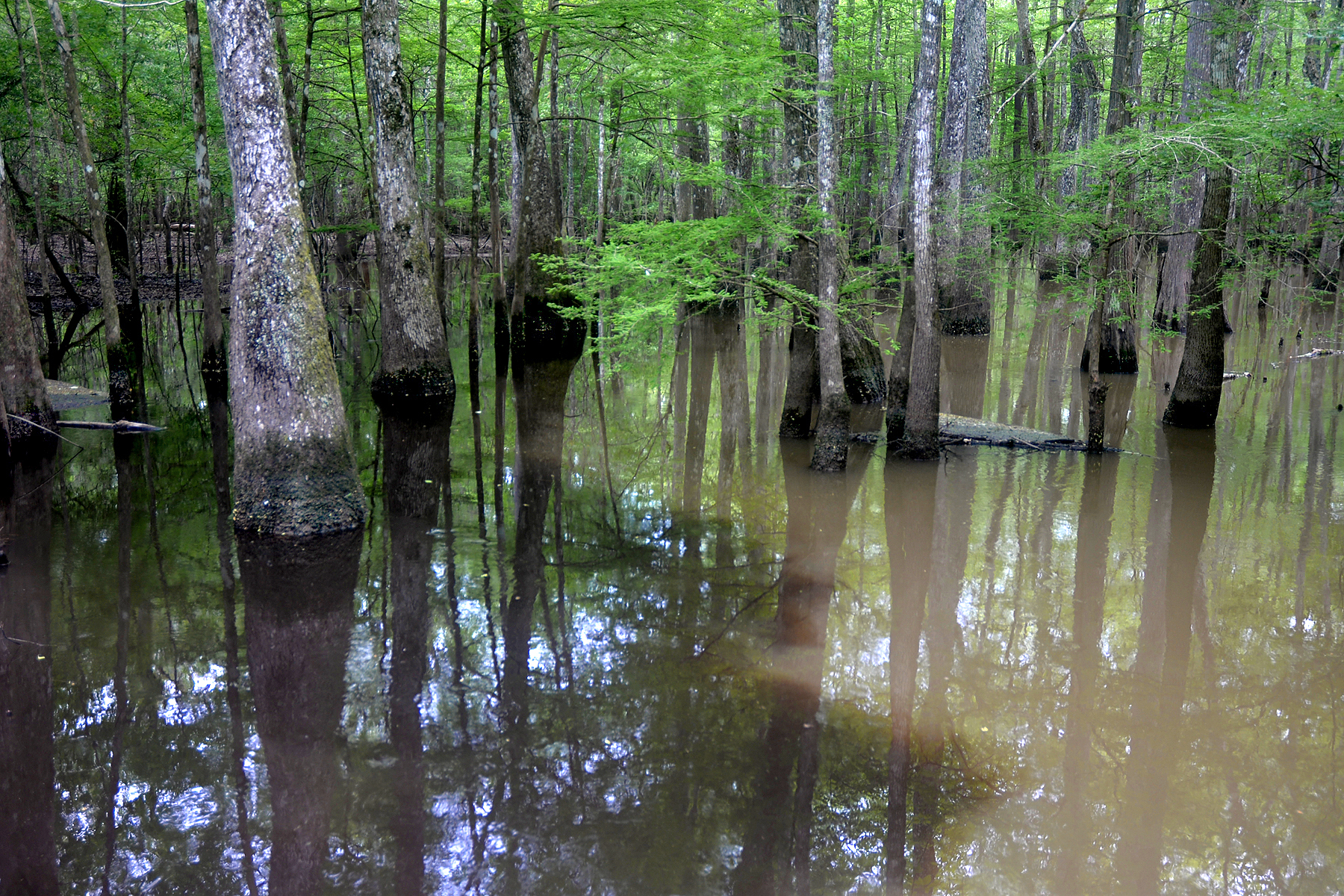
Baygall blackwater (left) mixing with typical muddy water (right). Big Thicket National Preserve, Jack Gore Baygall Unit, Hardin Co. Texas; 3 April 2020

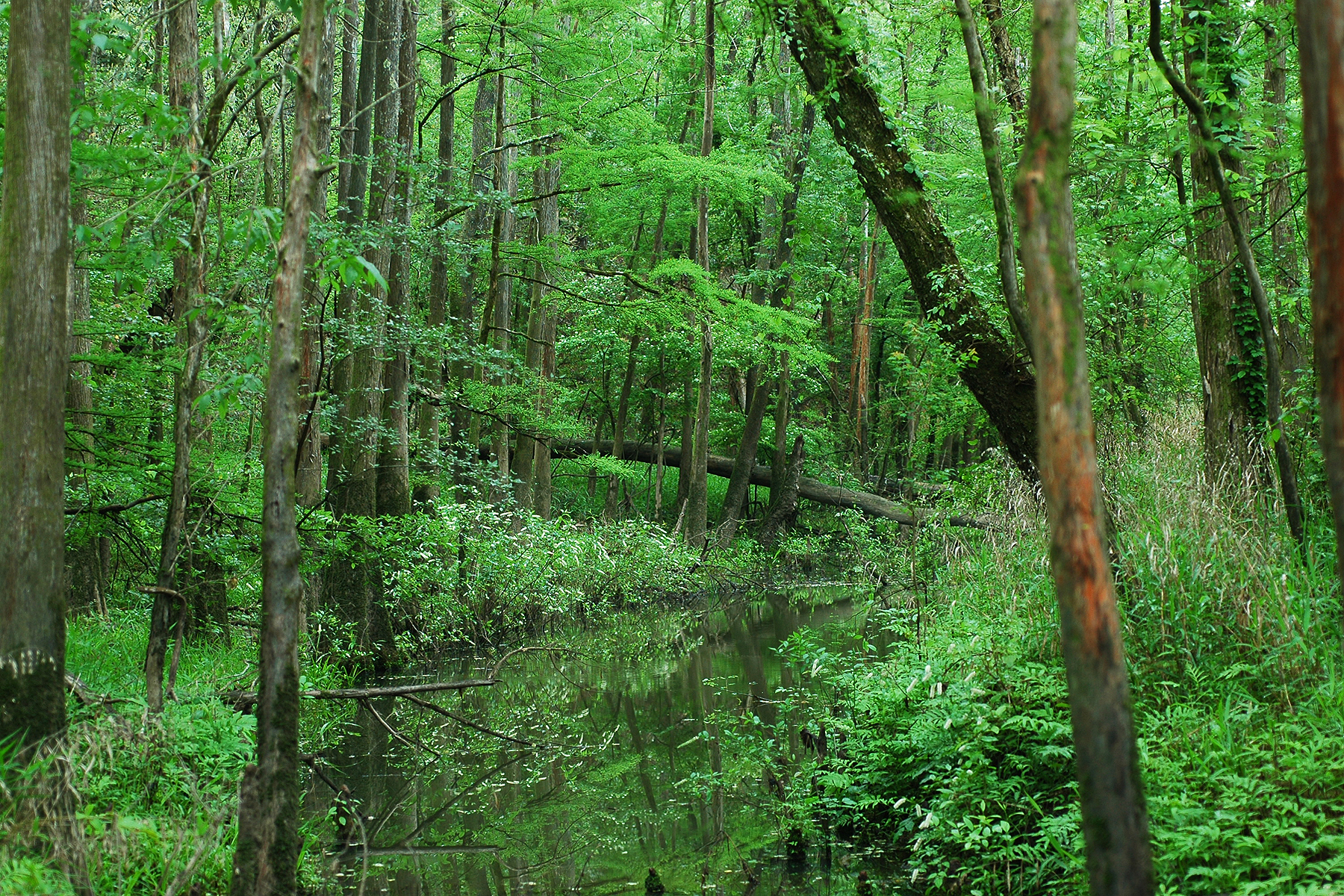
Lush vegetation in the Village Creek floodplain. Roy E. Larsen Sandyland Sanctuary, Hardin Co. Texas; 30 April 2010

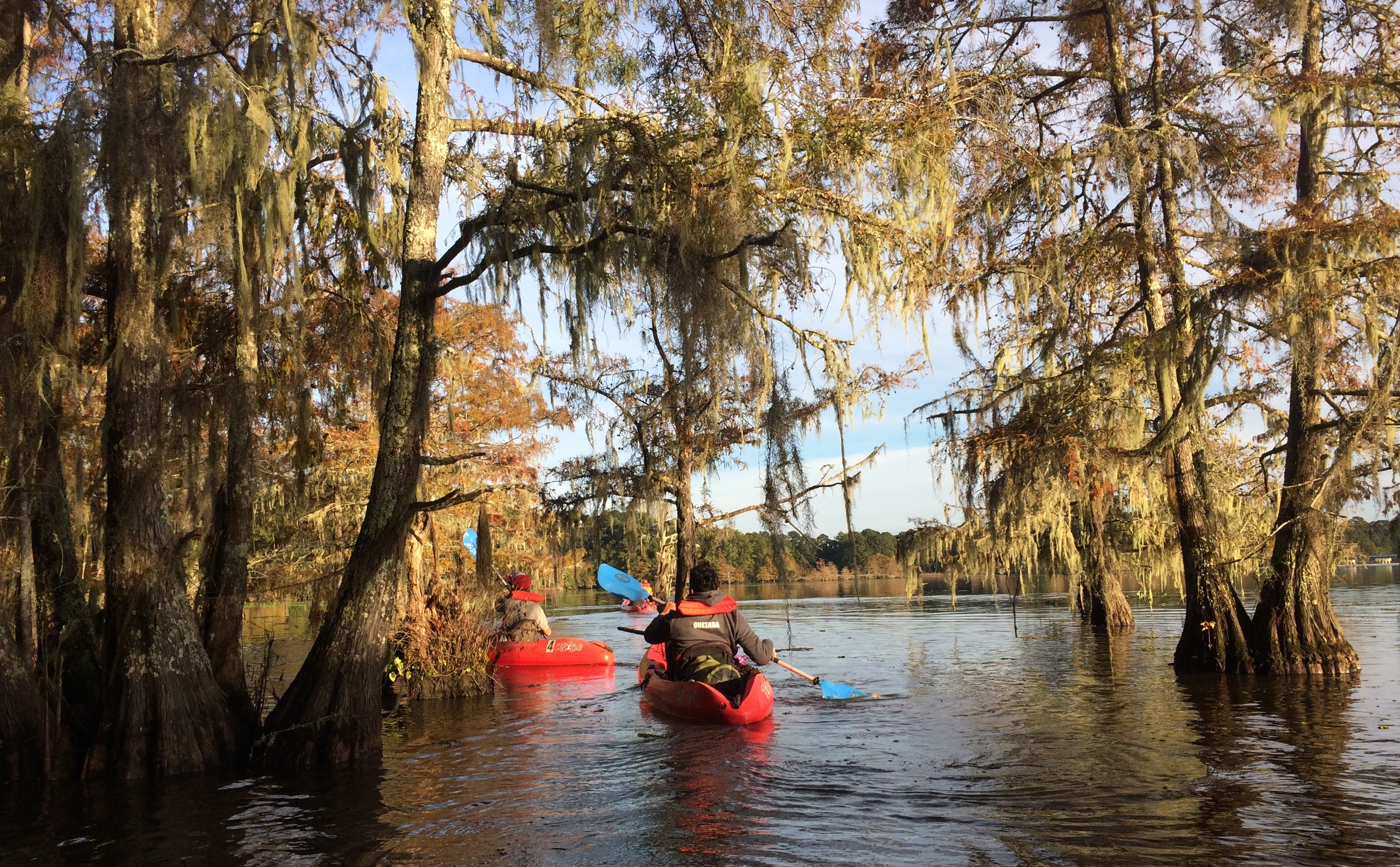
Kayakers in the Big Thicket National Preserve

Exact numbers of plant and animal species occurring in the Big Thicket region are difficult to state objectively due to a number of factors including: the imprecise boundaries of the area; which (if any) accidental and vagrant species to count; whether to count extinct and extirpated species; whether to count introduced and invasive species; migratory vs. resident species; frequent taxonomic changes and taxonomic instability. These and other factors all contribute to what sometimes appear as inconsistent or contradictory counts and numbers.

=== Flora ===
The area contains over 100 species of trees and shrubs, with longleaf pine (Pinus palustris) once dominating the region. Big Thicket National Preserve has introduced programs to re-establish this dominance, including one of the US's most active prescribed burn programs. With the National Park Service's centennial occurring in 2016, efforts were made to plant between 100,000 and 300,000 longleaf pines. The National Park Service lists more than one thousand species of flowering plants and ferns that can also be found in the thicket, including 20 orchids and four types of carnivorous plants.

Wildflower gallery

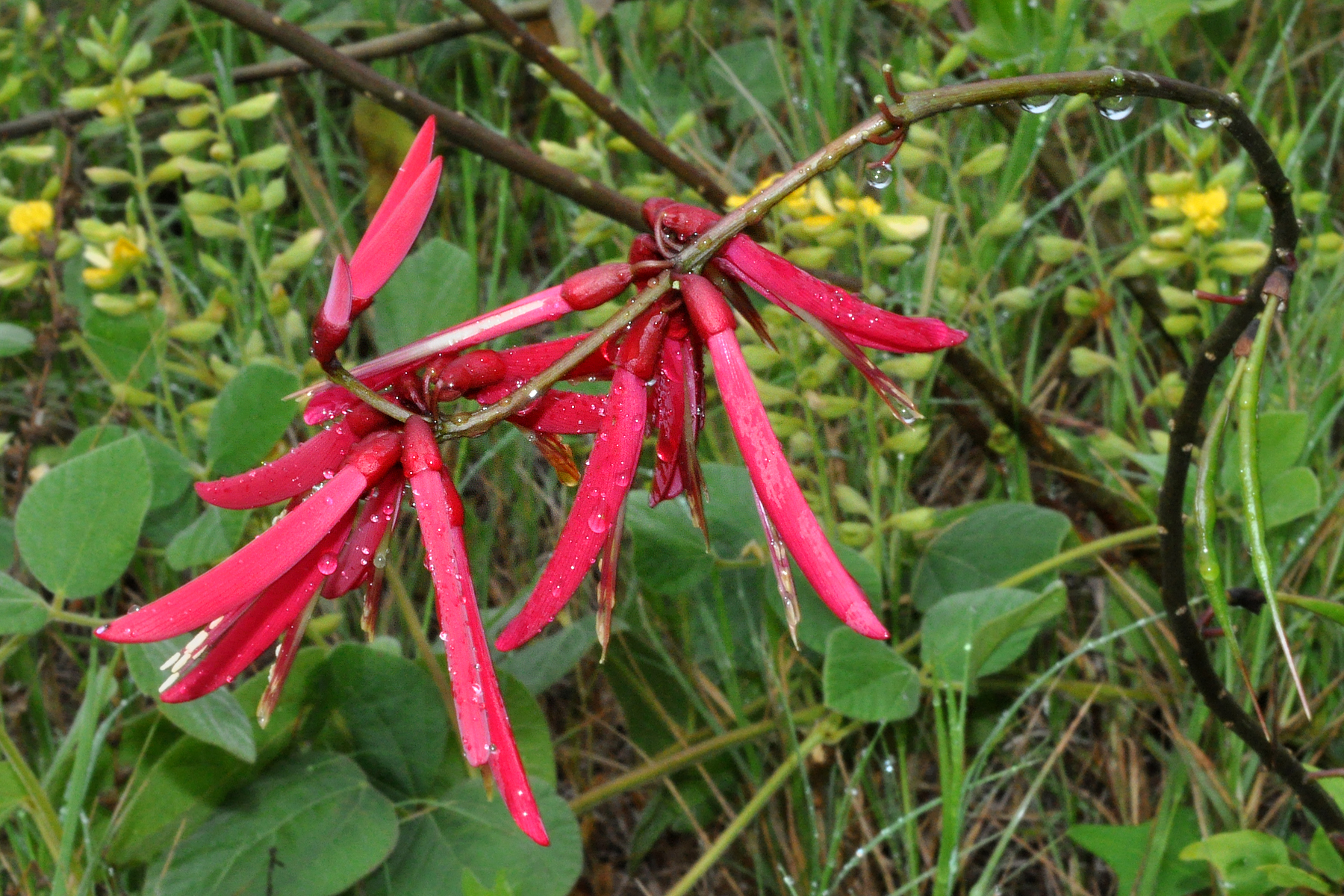
Coral bean (Erythrina herbacea) Tyler County

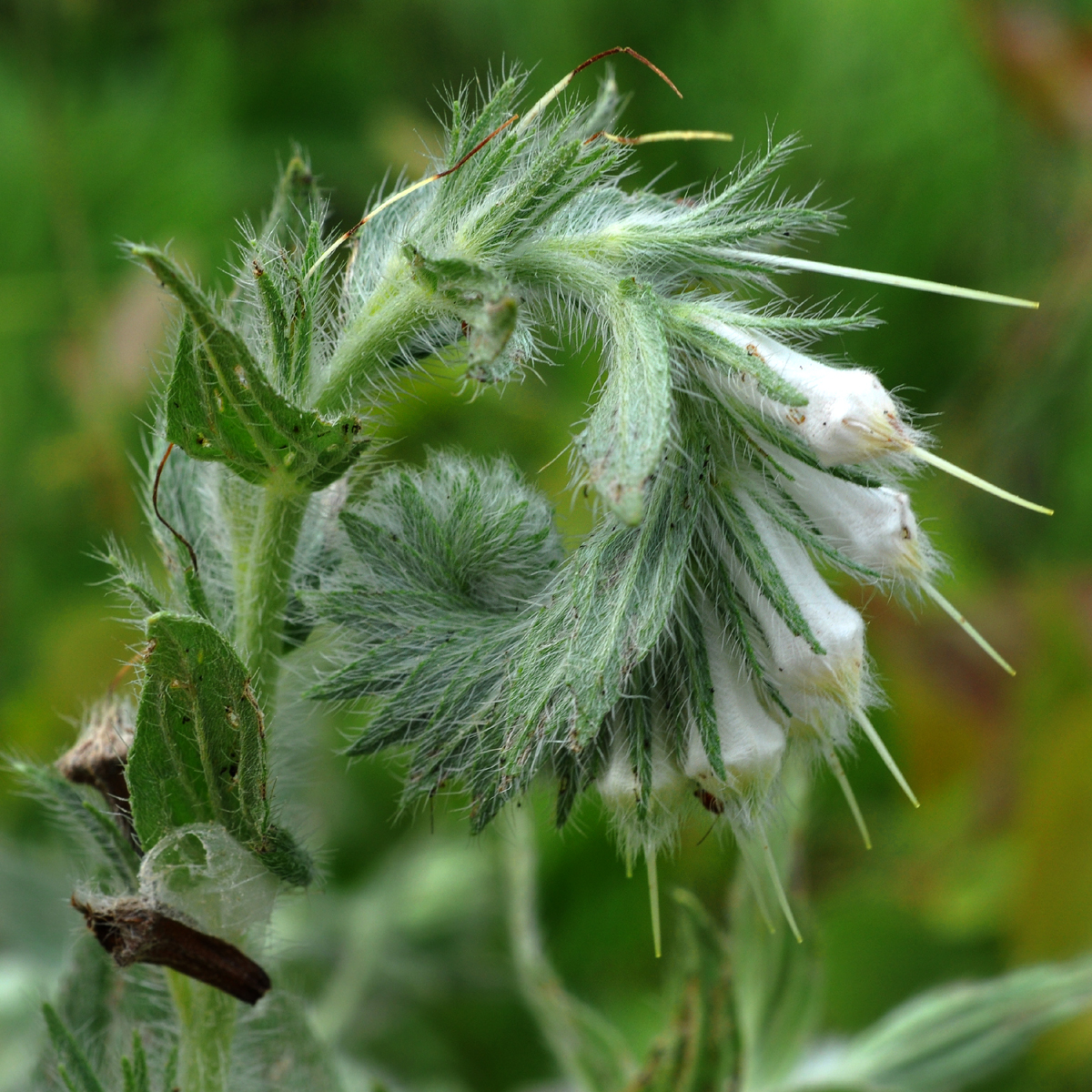
False gromwell (Onosmodium bejariense) Walker County

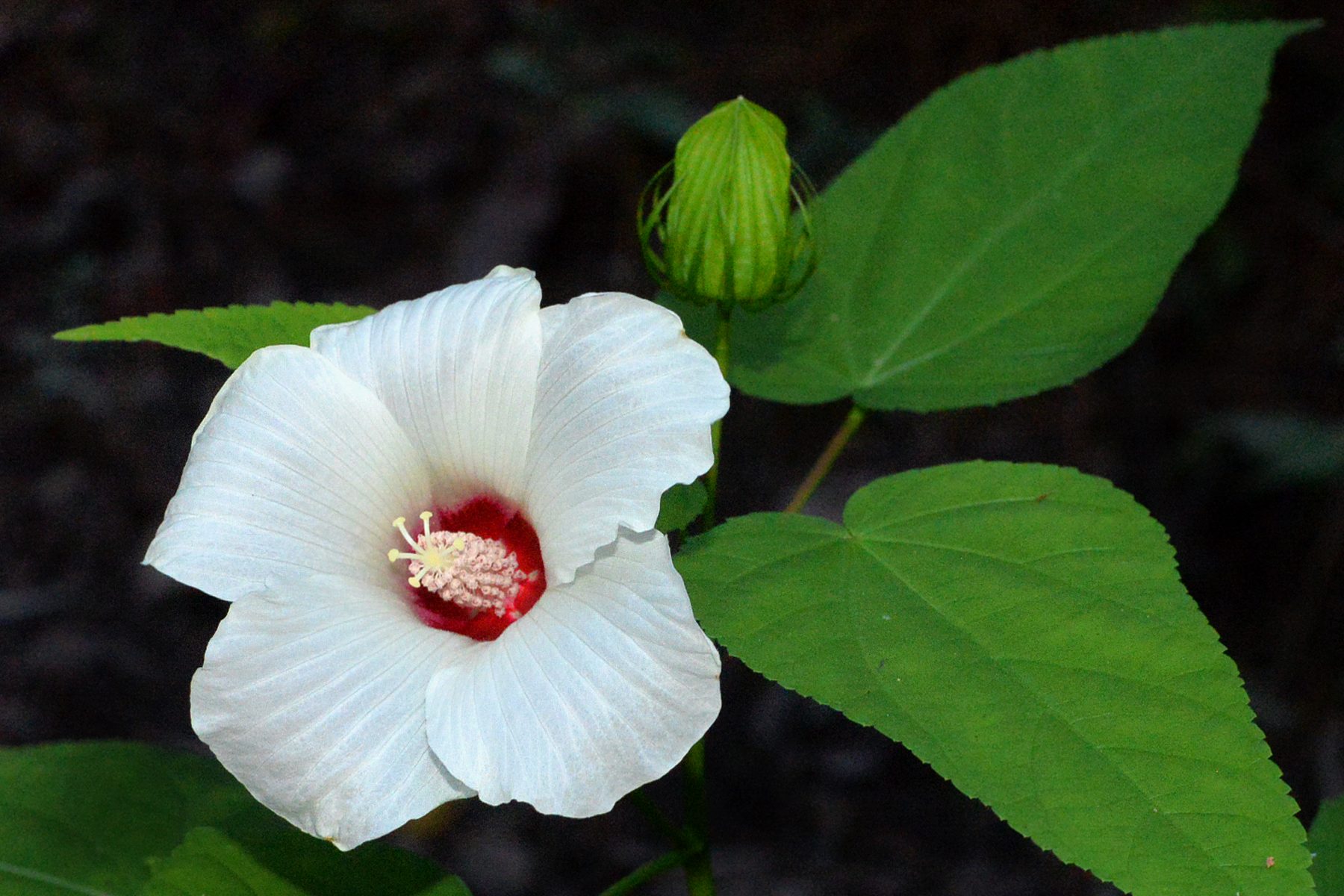
Rose mallow (Hibiscus sp.) Hardin County

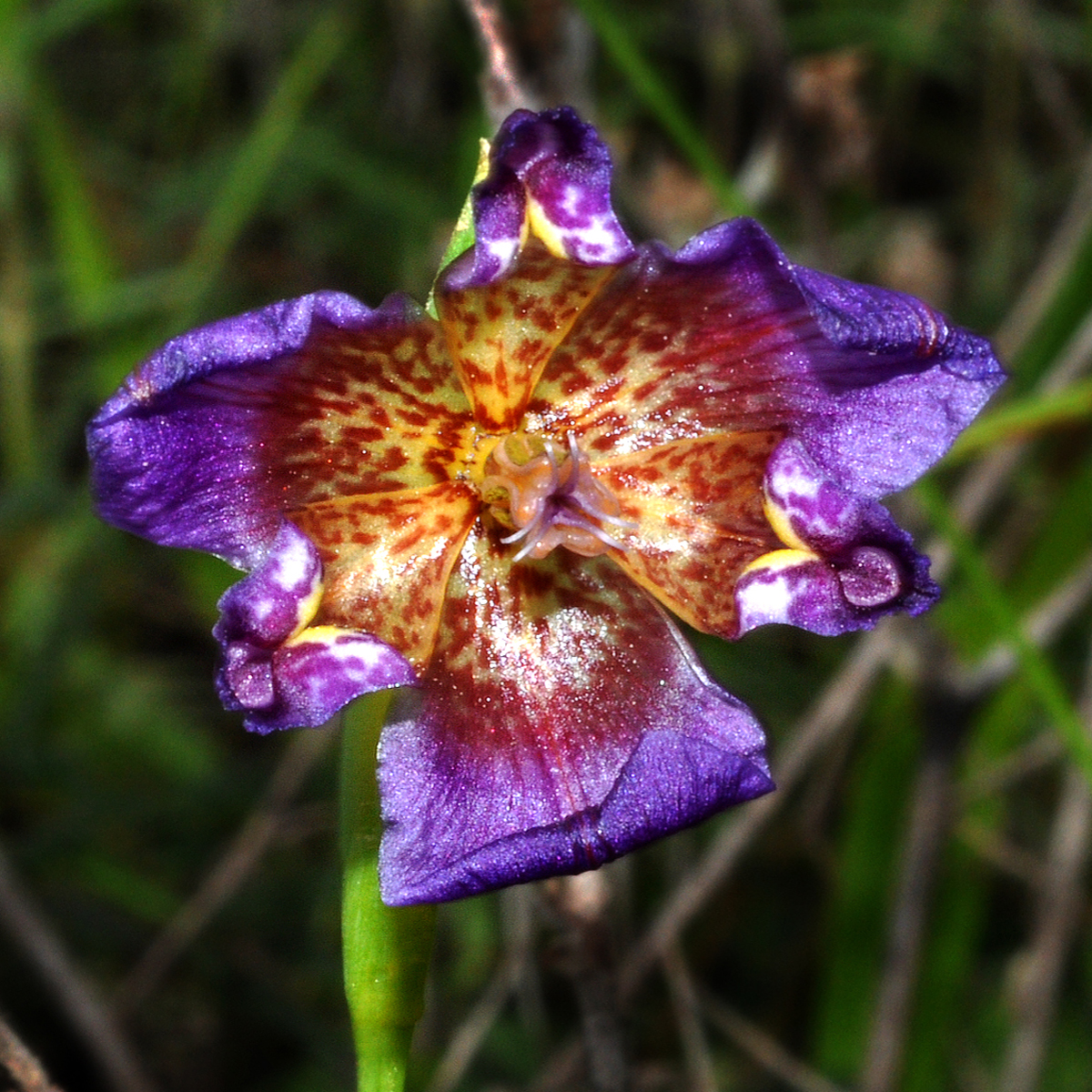
Pinewoods lily (Alophia drummondii) Hardin County

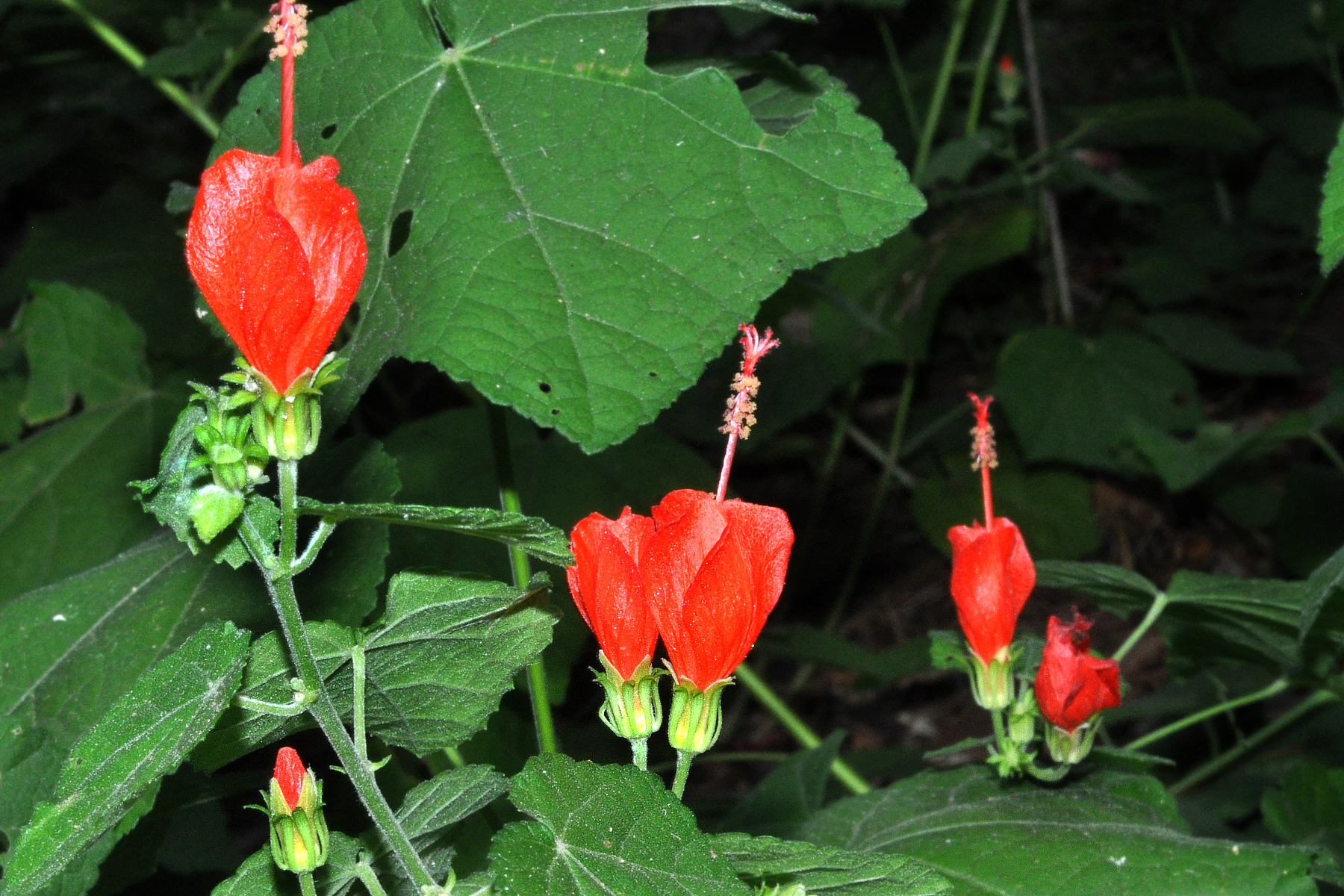
Turkcap (Malvaviscus arboreus var. drummondii) San Jacinto County

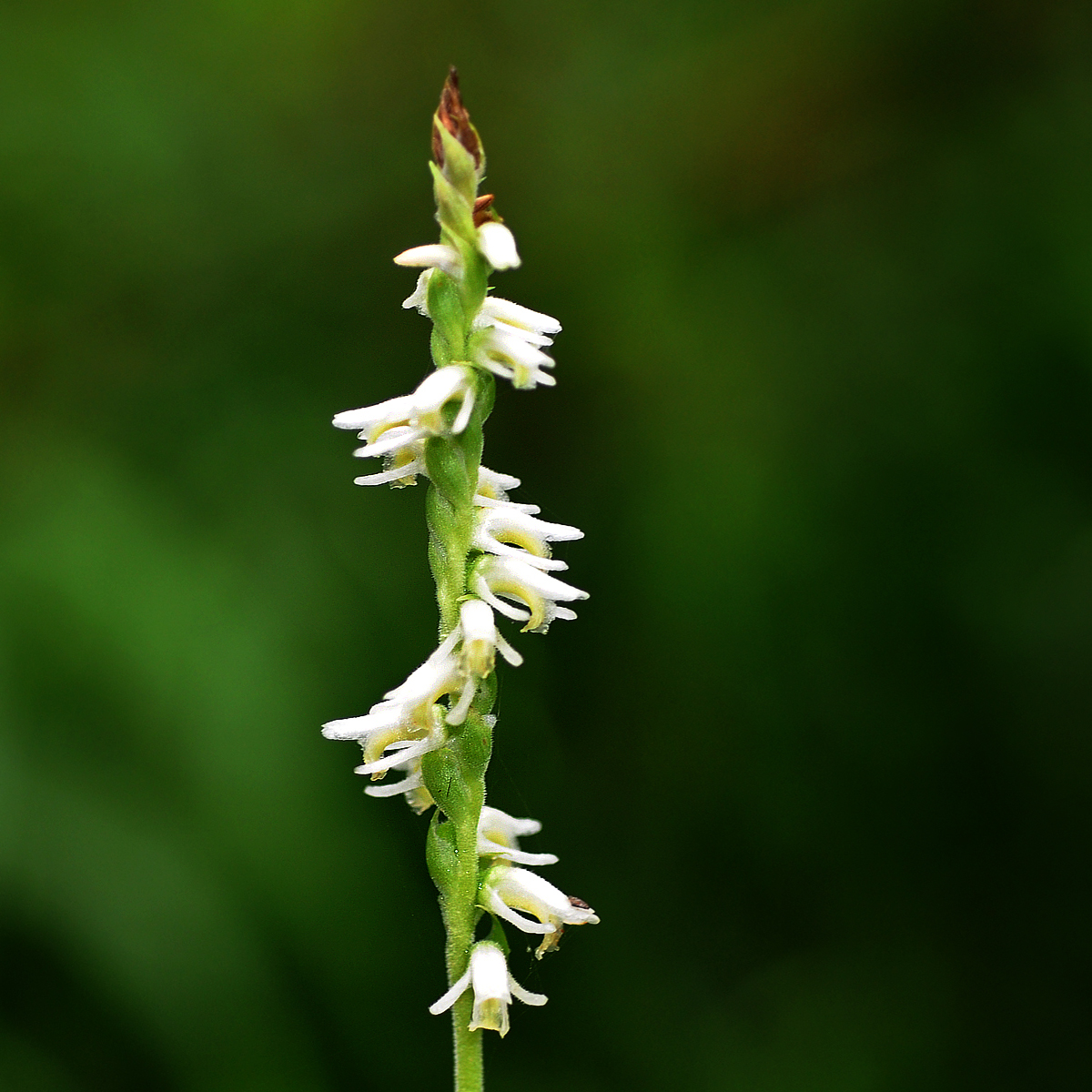
Ladies'-tresses orchid (Spiranthes sp.) Tyler County

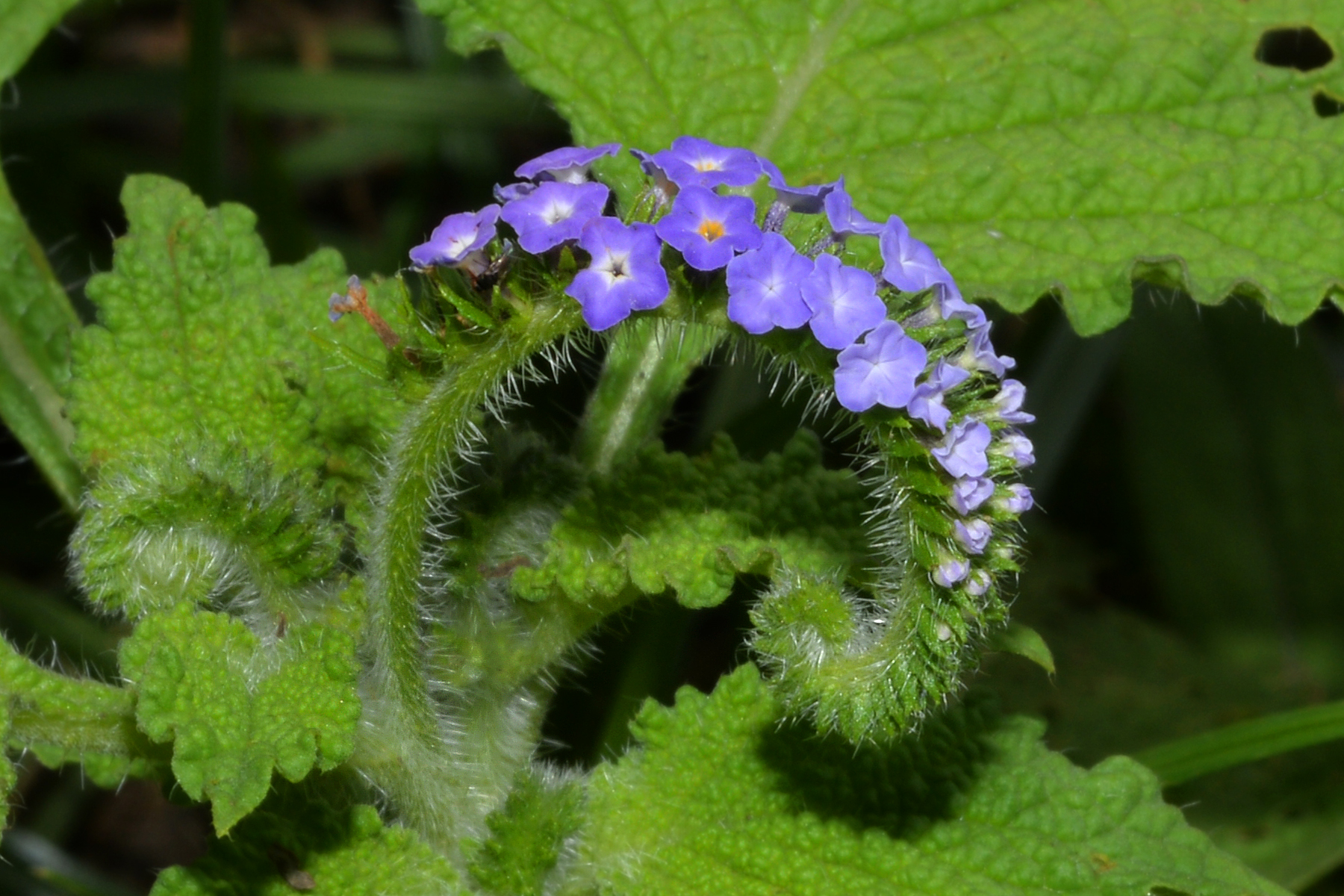
Turnsole (Heliotropium indicum) Liberty County
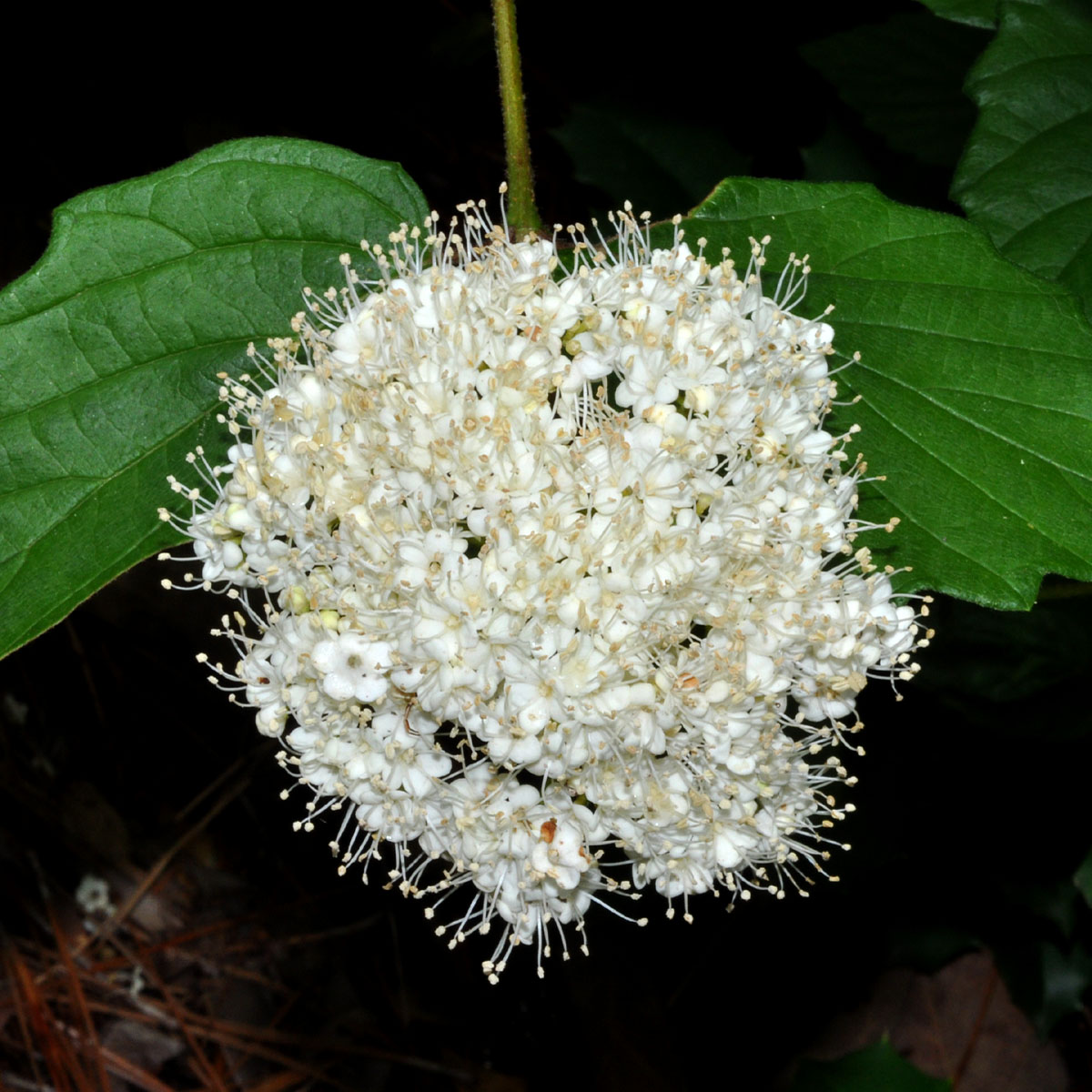
Southern arrowwood (Viburnum dentatum), Tyler County

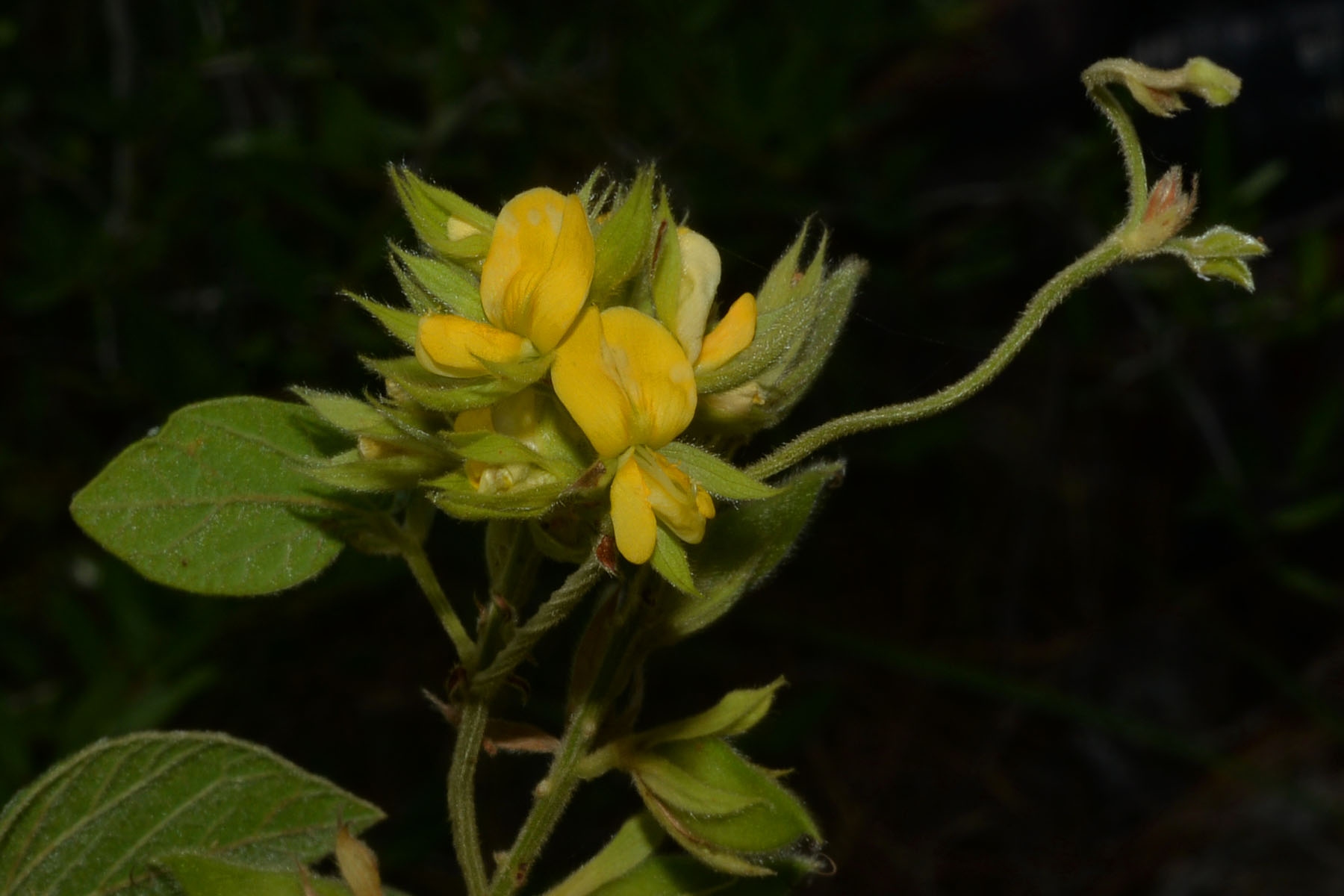
Broad-leaf snoutbean (Rhynchosia latifolia), Polk County

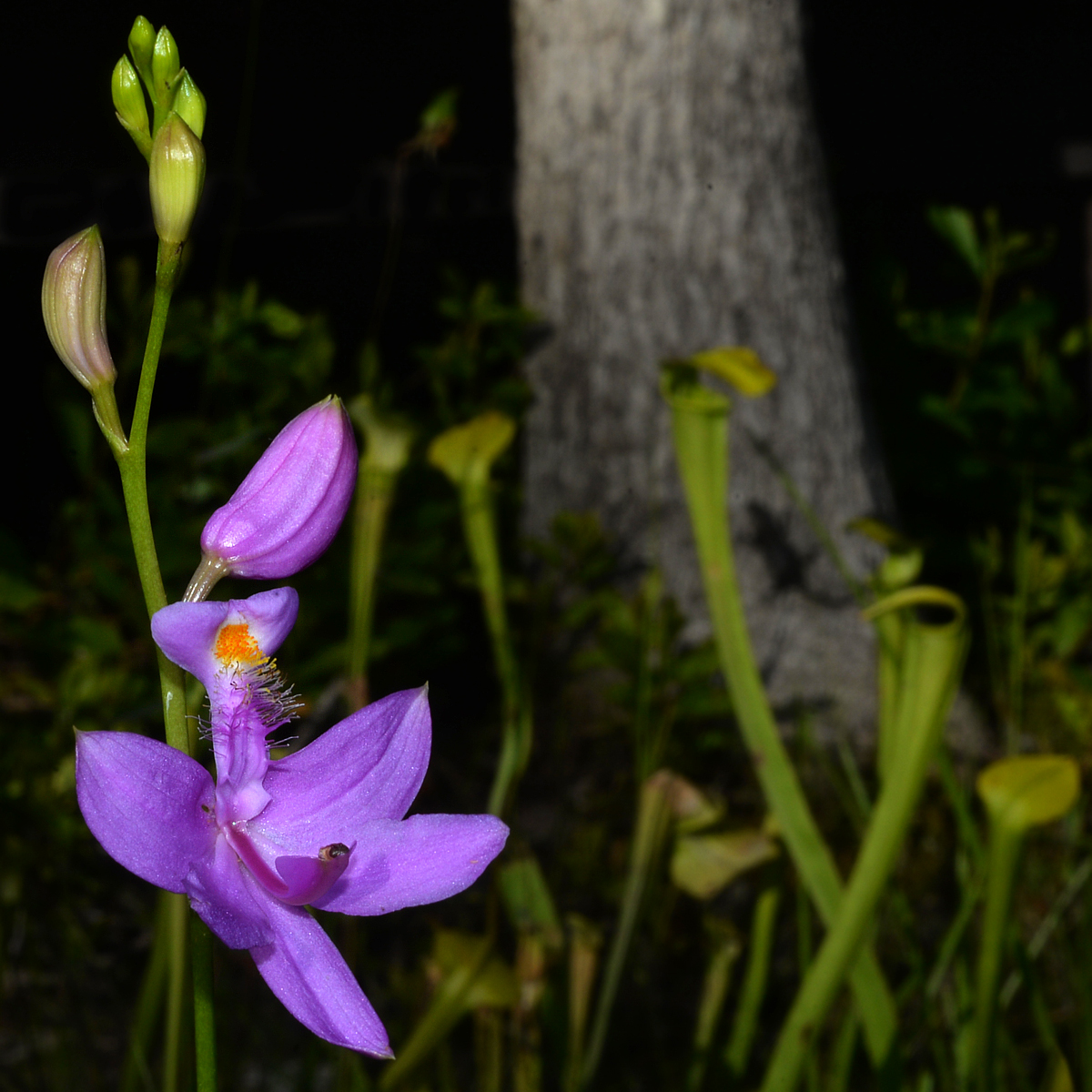
Grass-pink orchid (Calopogon sp.), Tyler County

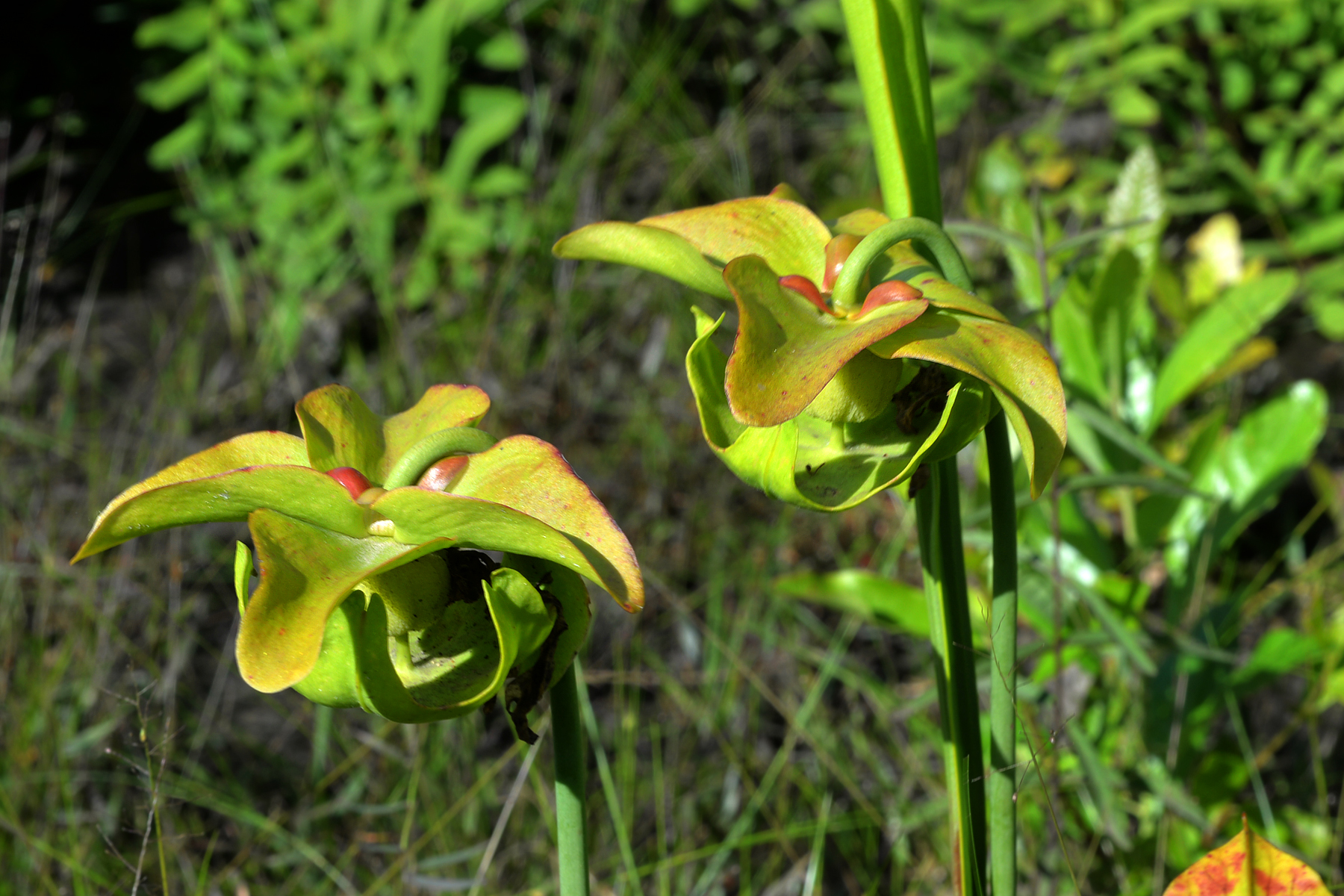
Pitcher plant (Sarracenia alata), Tyler County

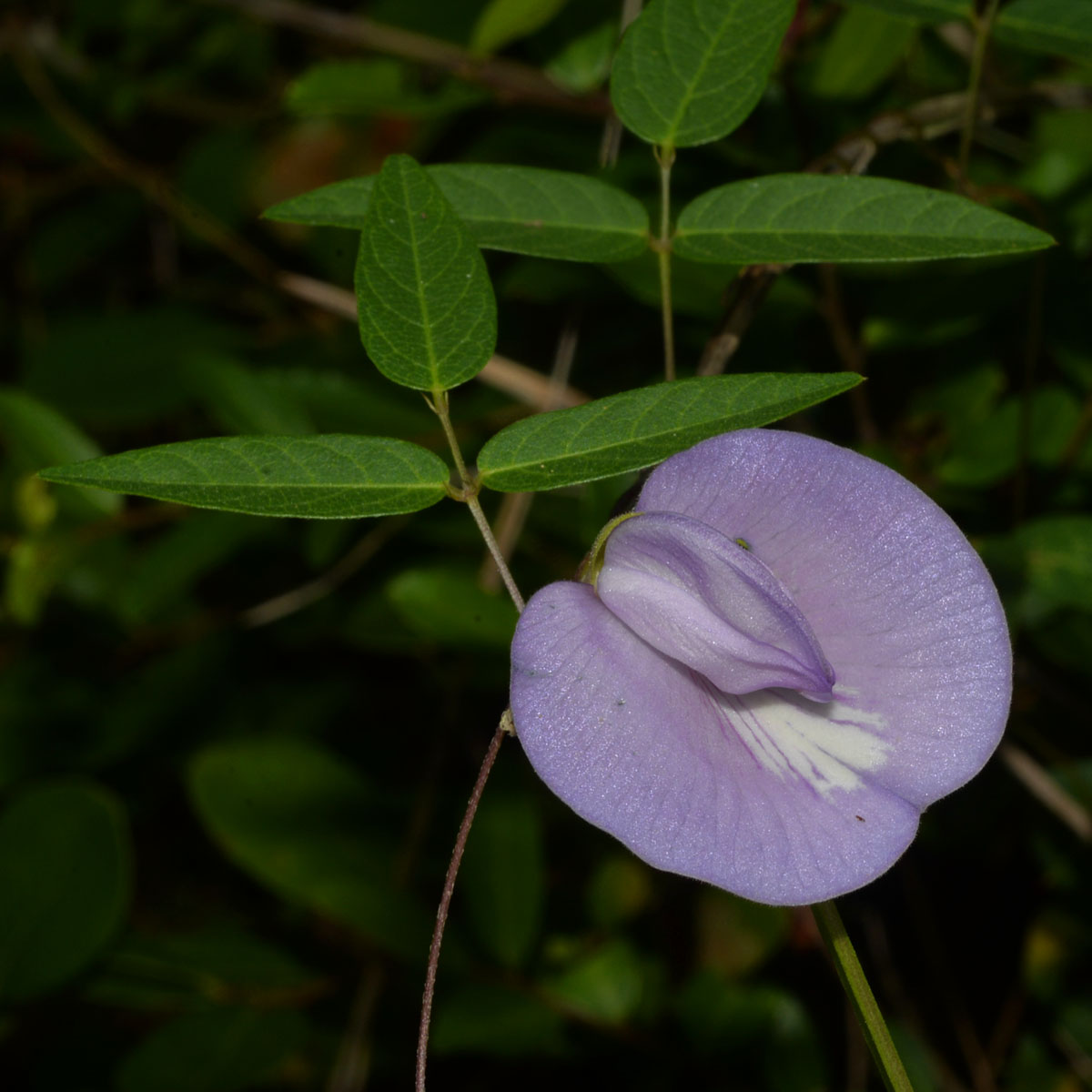
Butterfly pea (Centrosema virginianum), Polk County

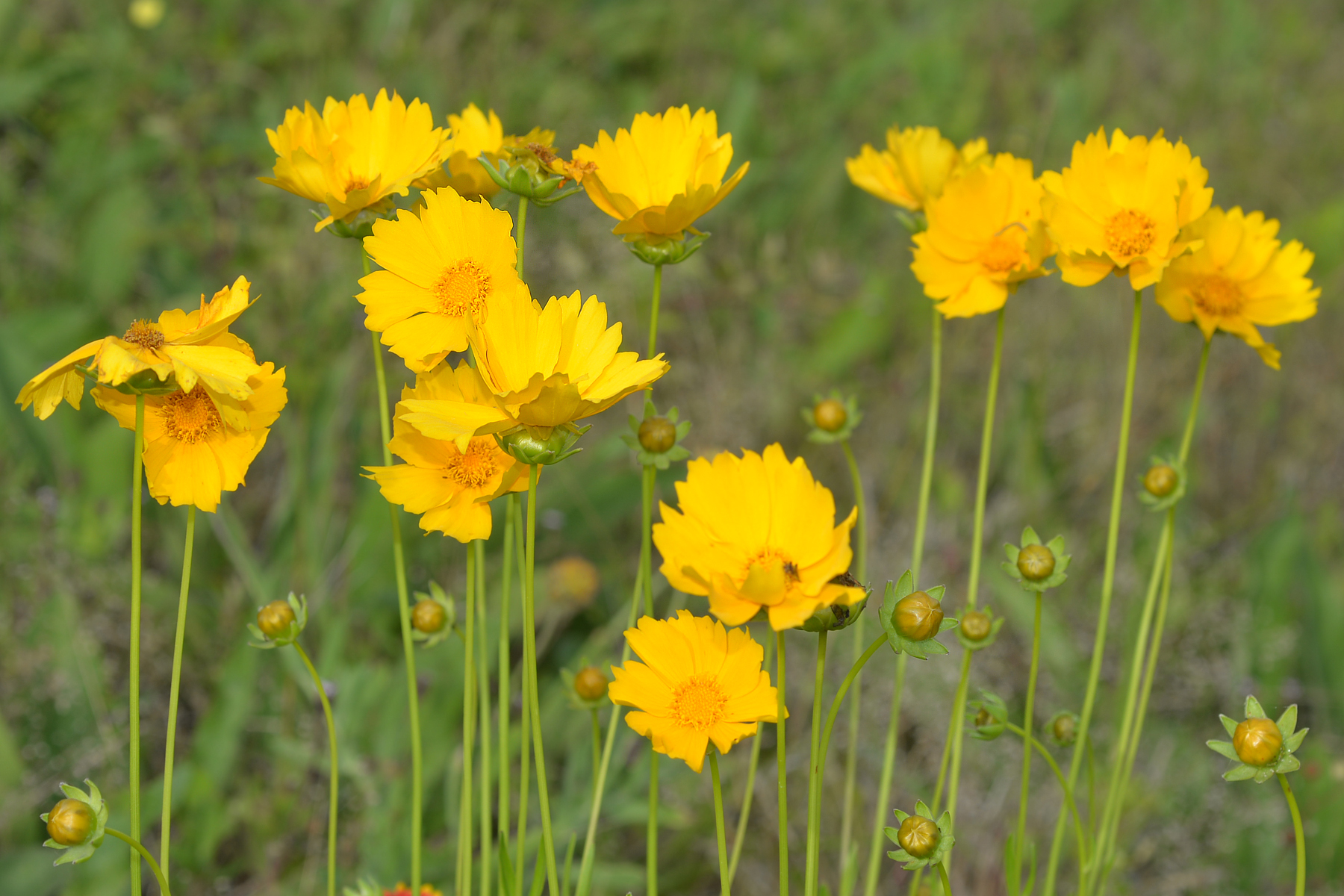
Lance-leaved coreopsis (Coreopsis lanceolata), Hardin County

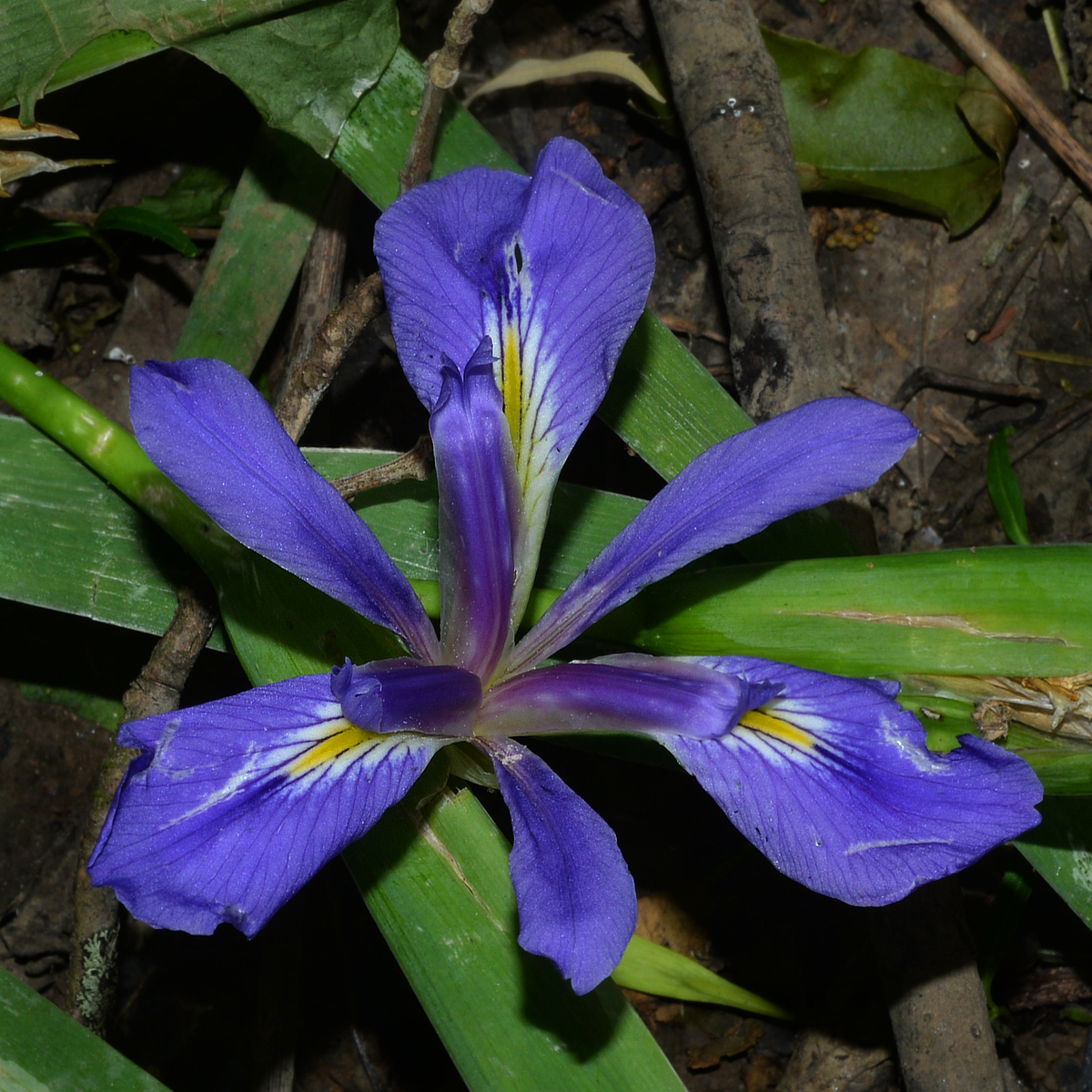
Short-stem iris (Iris brevicaulis) Polk County

=== Fauna ===
During the last glacial period, plant and animal species from many different biomes moved into the area. Before their extinction, the Big Thicket was home to most species of North American megafauna.

Well over 500 species of vertebrates occur in the Big Thicket region, including more than 50 mammals, 300 birds, 60 reptiles, 30 amphibians, and over 90 fishes. The records and numbers below for mammals, reptiles, and amphibians are based on county records for Hardin, Jasper, Liberty, Montgomery, Polk, San Jacinto, Tyler, and Walker counties, which in a few cases may reflect marginal, peripheral, and vagrant records for a given species in the region and not all of the species are ubiquitous or evenly distributed throughout the Big Thicket.

Mammals: About 54 species of mammals occur in the Big Thicket (not counting extirpated species), including such species as the Virginia opossum (Didelphis virginiana), nine-banded armadillo (Dasypus novemcinctus), short-tailed shrew (Blarina carolinensis), American beaver (Castor canadensis), Baird's pocket gopher (Geomys breviceps), southern flying squirrel (Glaucomys volans), white-tailed deer (Odocoileus virginianus), eastern spotted skunk (Spilogale putorius), American mink (Mustela vison), river otter (Lontra canadensis), coyote (Canis latrans), gray fox (Urocyon cinereoargenteus), bobcat (Lynx rufus), and Rafinesque's big-eared bat (Corynorhinus rafinesquii) a threatened species in Texas. Although many of these species are common, they can be highly secretive and are seldom seen in the dense woodlands. Many prominent species that once occurred in the Big Thicket have been extirpated from their historical ranges. Examples include hog-nosed skunks (Conepatus leuconotus), red wolves (Canis rufus), ocelots (Leopardus pardalis), and jaguars (Panthera onca). In 1902 ornithologist Harry Church Oberholser reported what he considered reliable accounts of jaguars in east Texas, including one killed south of Jasper a few years earlier, along the Neches River near Beaumont, and in the timber south of Conroe.

Although once common in the Big Thicket, the American black bears (Ursus americanus) was the target of a concerted effort to extirpate them from east Texas in the late nineteenth century. Reports of field naturalists in 1902 indicated:

- Conroe: "A few still found in the big thicket 15 mile south of here."
- Beaumont: "A few still found in the forest northwest of here."
- Sour Lake: "Still common in the swamps near here; a few killed every year."
- Rockland: "Now very rare or quite extinct."

Vernon Bailey, chief naturalist for the U.S. Biological Survey, interviewed a hog farmer and bear hunter named Ab Carter in 1904. Carter reported that in 1883, he and a neighbor set out to exterminate the bears in the Tarkington Prairie area of Liberty County that preyed on their free-ranging hogs in the forest. That same year, 182 bears were killed within a 10-mile (16 km) radius of Tarkington Prairie, and annual hunting continued until 1900, when the last two bears were killed in that area. Currently, extremely rare bear sightings in east Texas are believed to be wandering individuals from reintroduction efforts in adjacent areas of Louisiana. They are now a threatened species in Texas, and the National Park Service list them as "probably present".

Conversely, other species have been introduced to the area, such as the nutria (Myocastor coypus) from South America, which is now common in the area. Feral pigs (Sus scrofa) "constitute one of the most serious conservation threats in Texas." They prey on natural populations of invertebrates, amphibians, reptiles, ground-nesting birds, and rodents and are known to play a role in the transmission of disease including brucellosis, pseudorabies, and swine fever. Their forging habits involve rooting up and disturbing soils, reducing both the numbers of individual plants and animals and the number species in any given area.

Mammal gallery

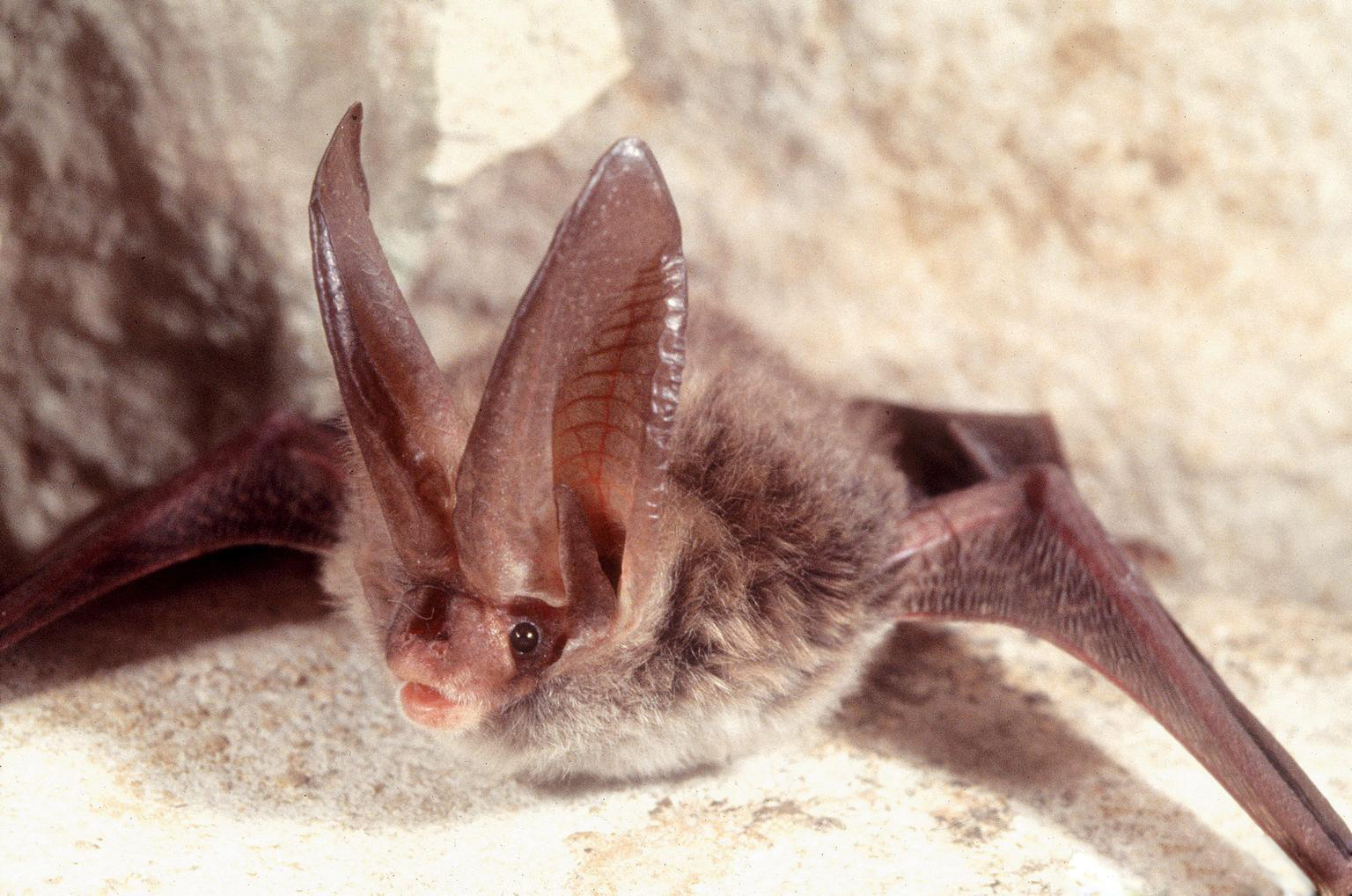
Rafinesque's big-eared bat (Corynorhinus rafinesquii)

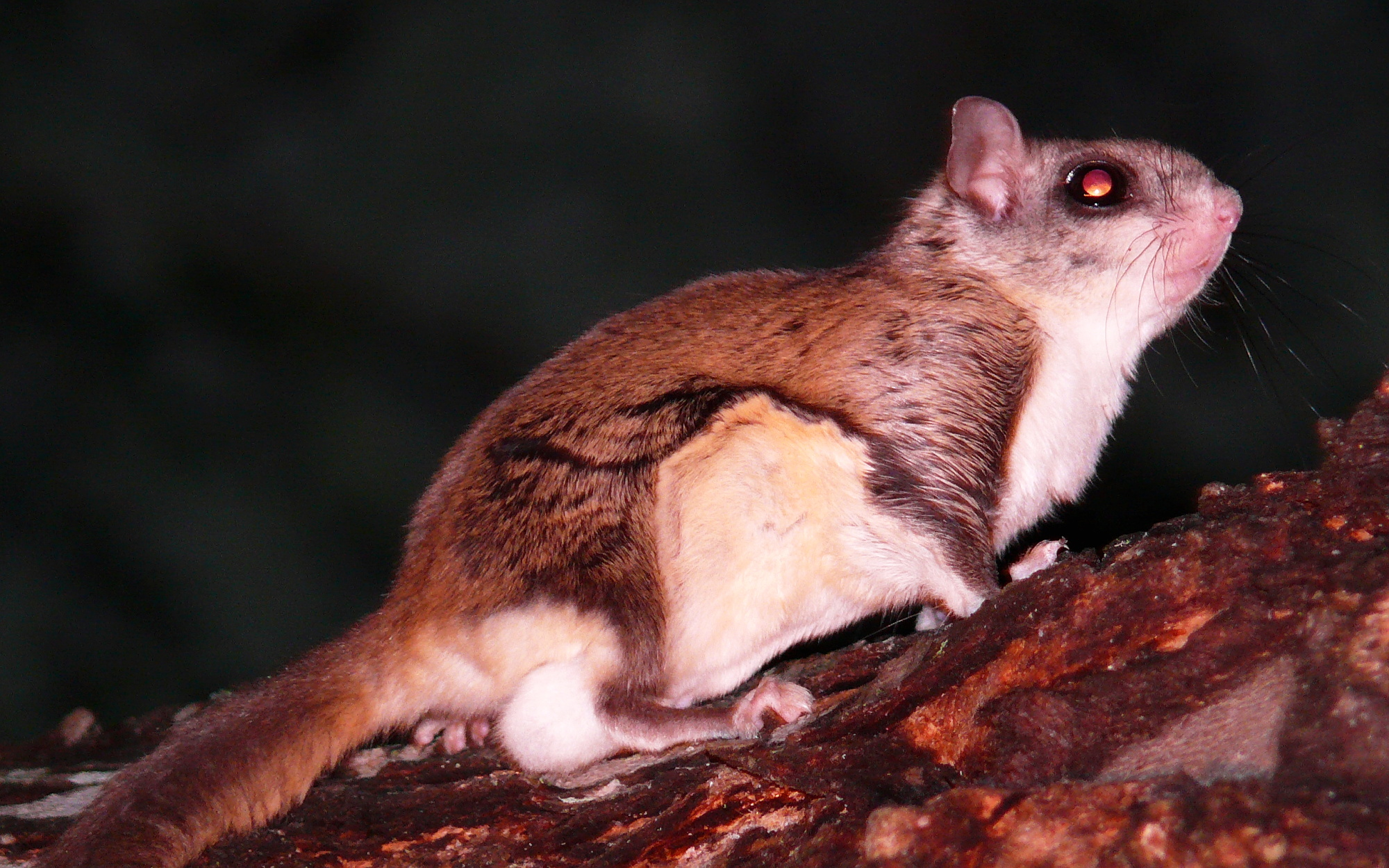
Southern flying squirrel (Glaucomys volans)

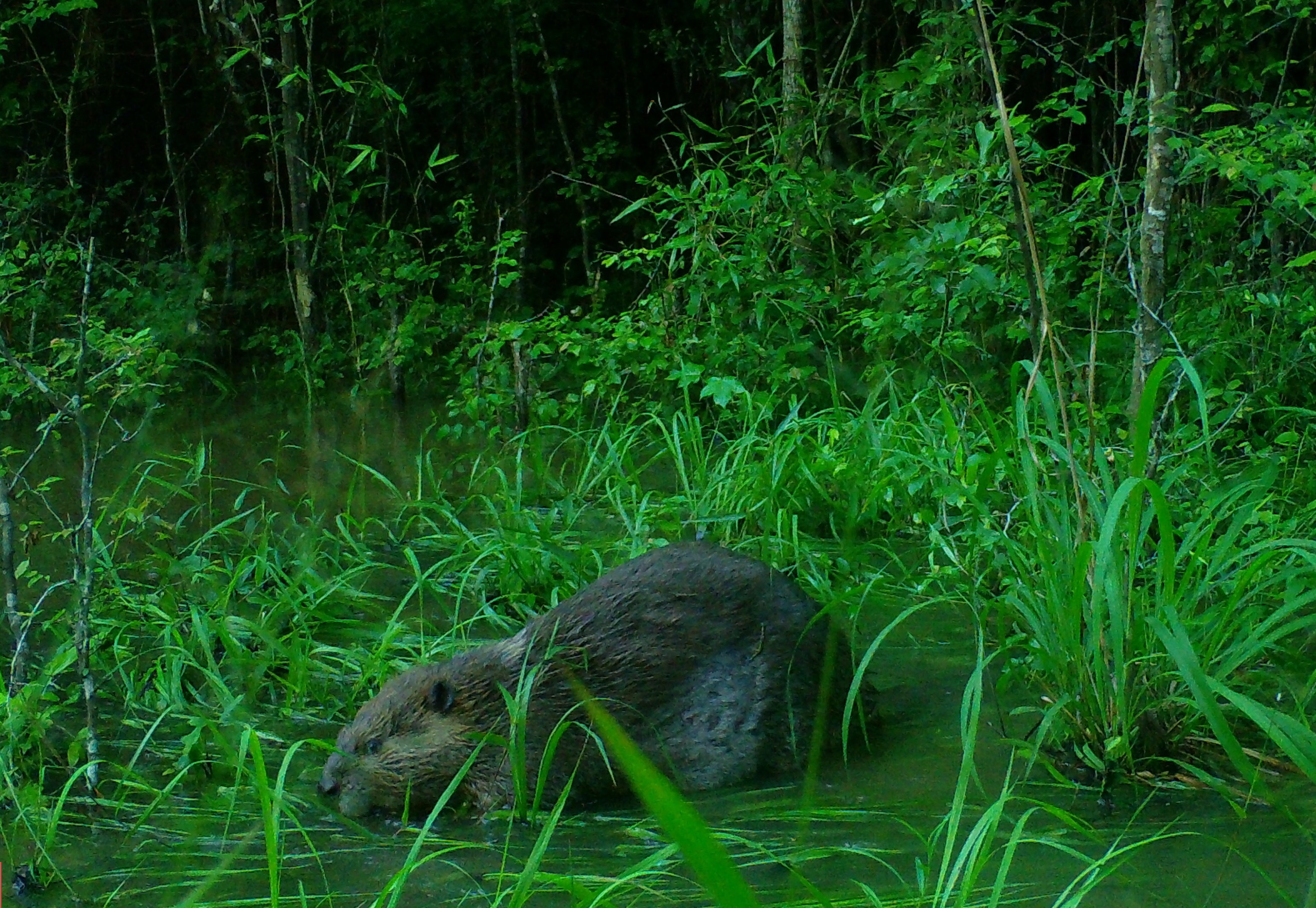
North American beaver (Castor canadensis), Big Thicket NP, camara trap

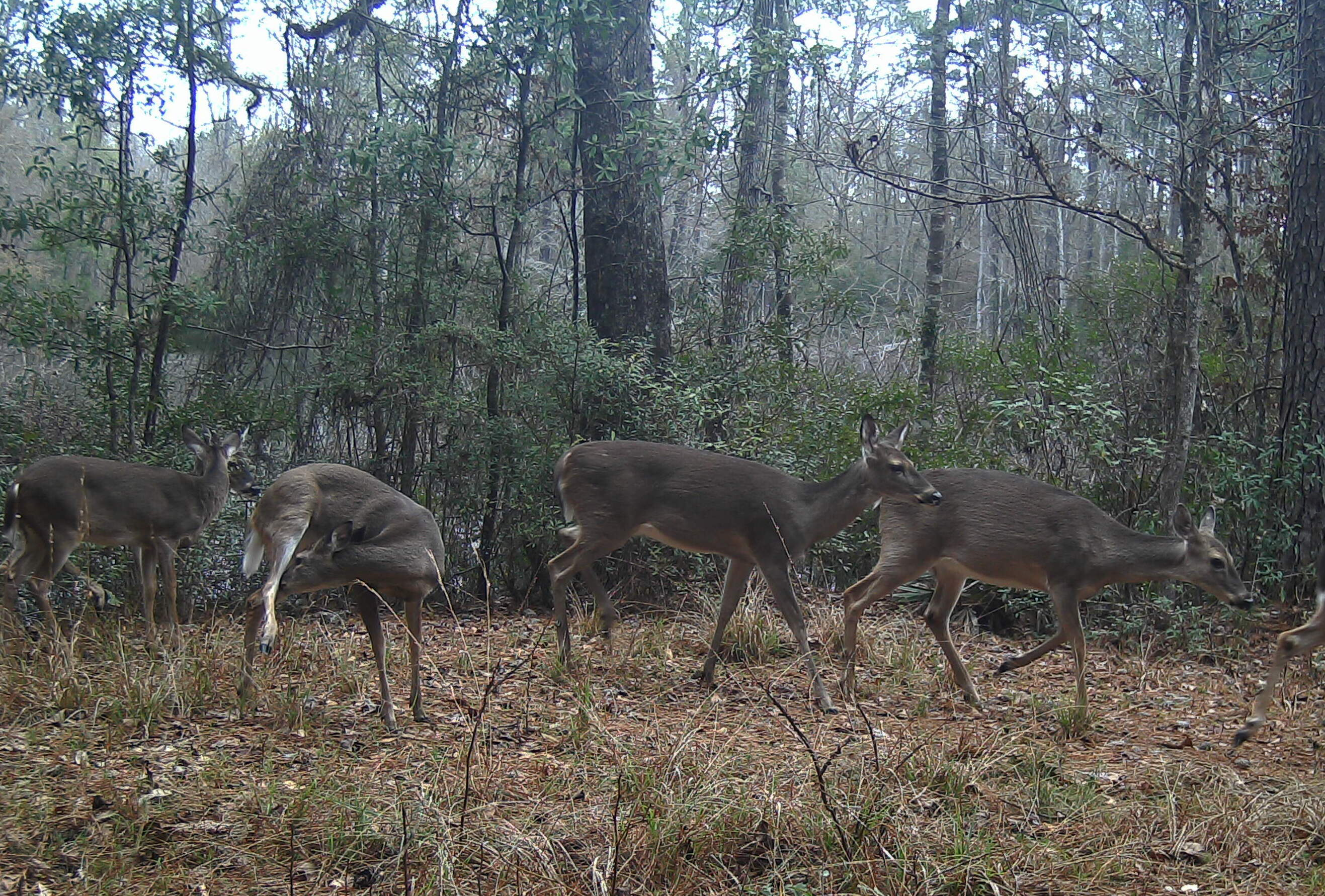
White-tailed deer (Odocoileus virginianus), Big Thicket NP, camara trap

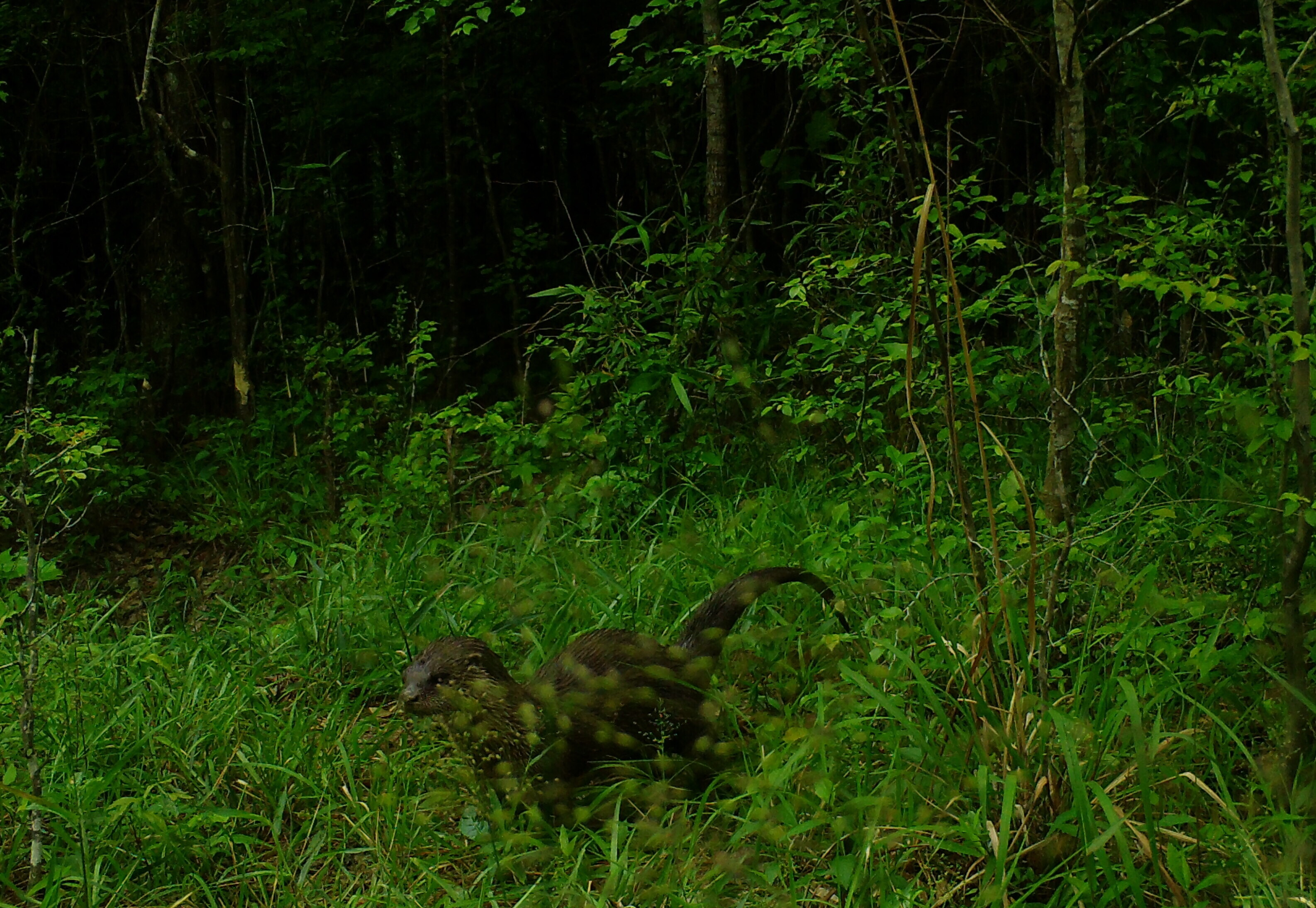
River otter (Lontra canadensis), Big Thicket NP, camara trap

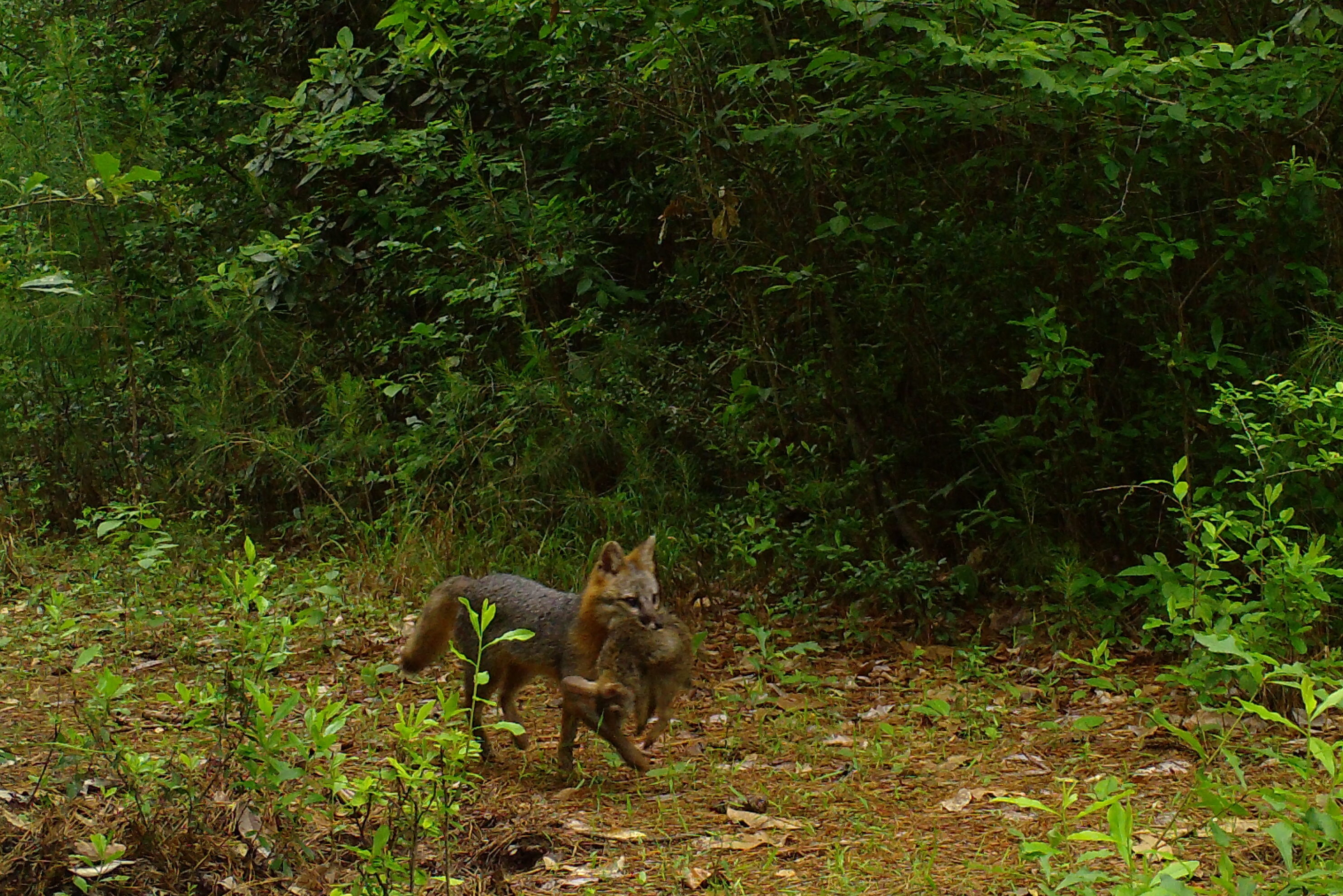
Gray fox (Urocyon cinereoargenteus) with rabbit (S. aquaticus or S. floridanus), BTNP, camara trap

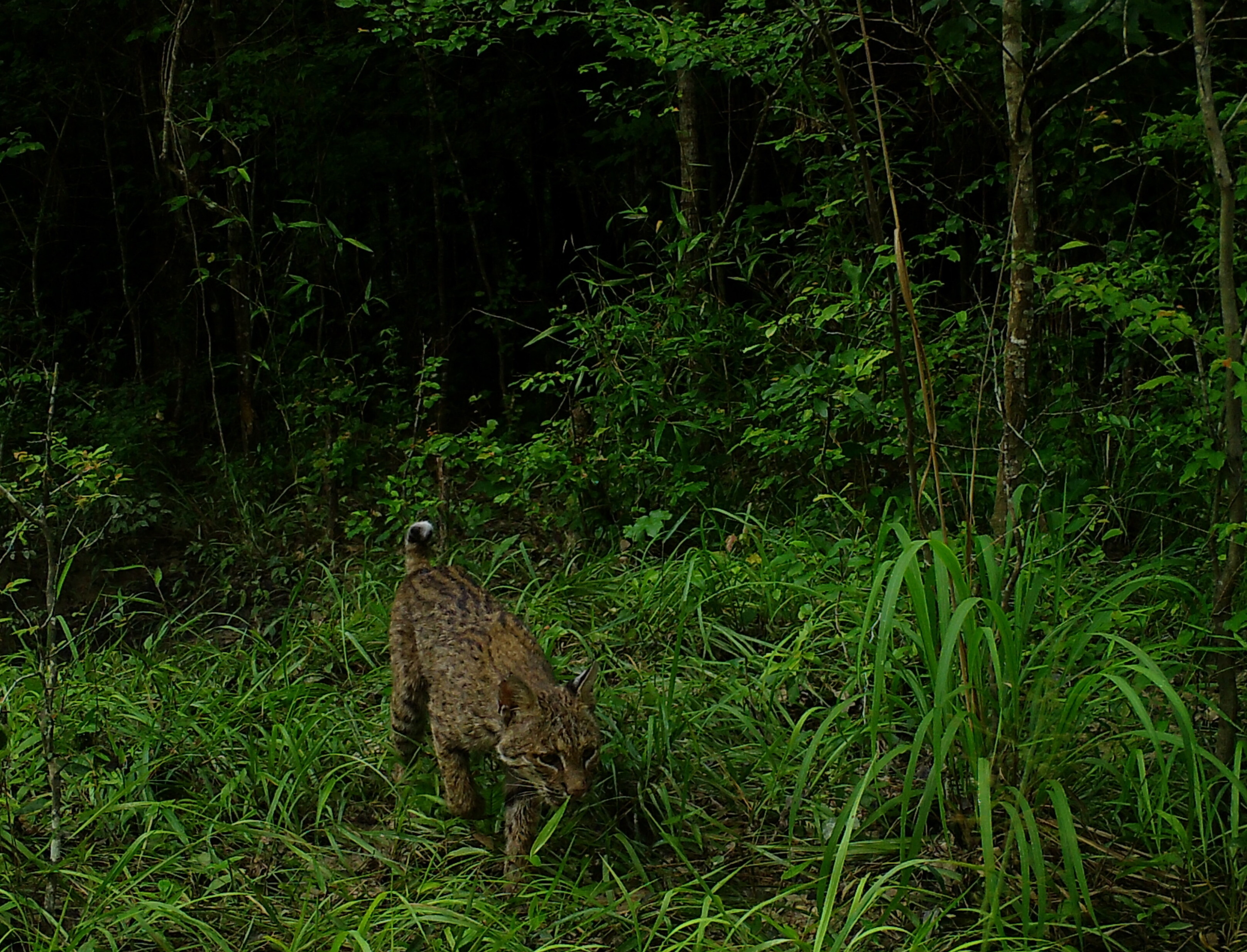
Bobcat (Lynx rufus), Big Thicket NP, camara trap

Birds: Three hundred species of migratory and nesting birds occur in the Big Thicket including the red-cockaded woodpecker, a state and federal endangered species. The extinct ivory-billed woodpecker once occurred in the Big Thicket.

Bird gallery

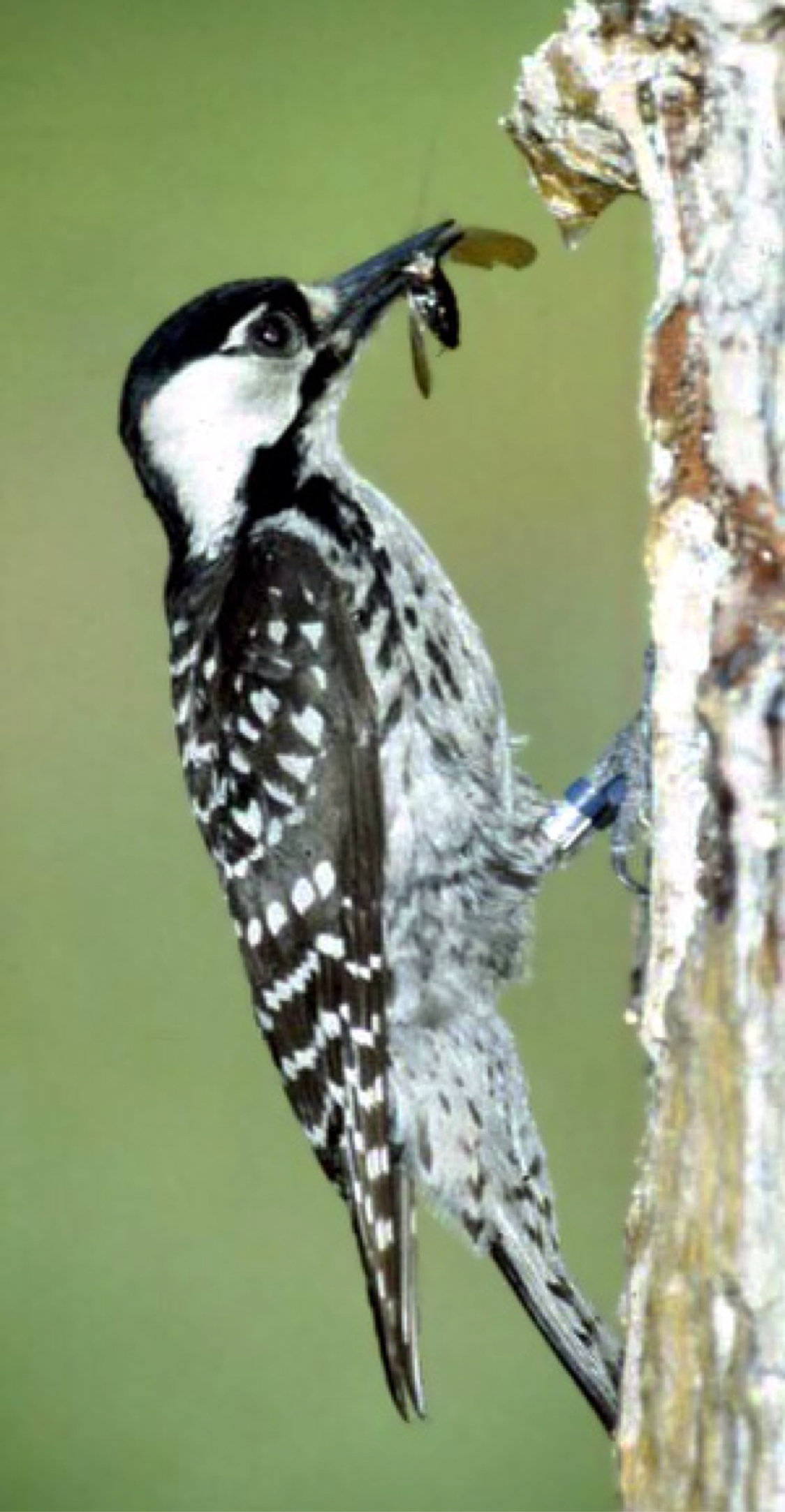
Red-cockaded woodpecker

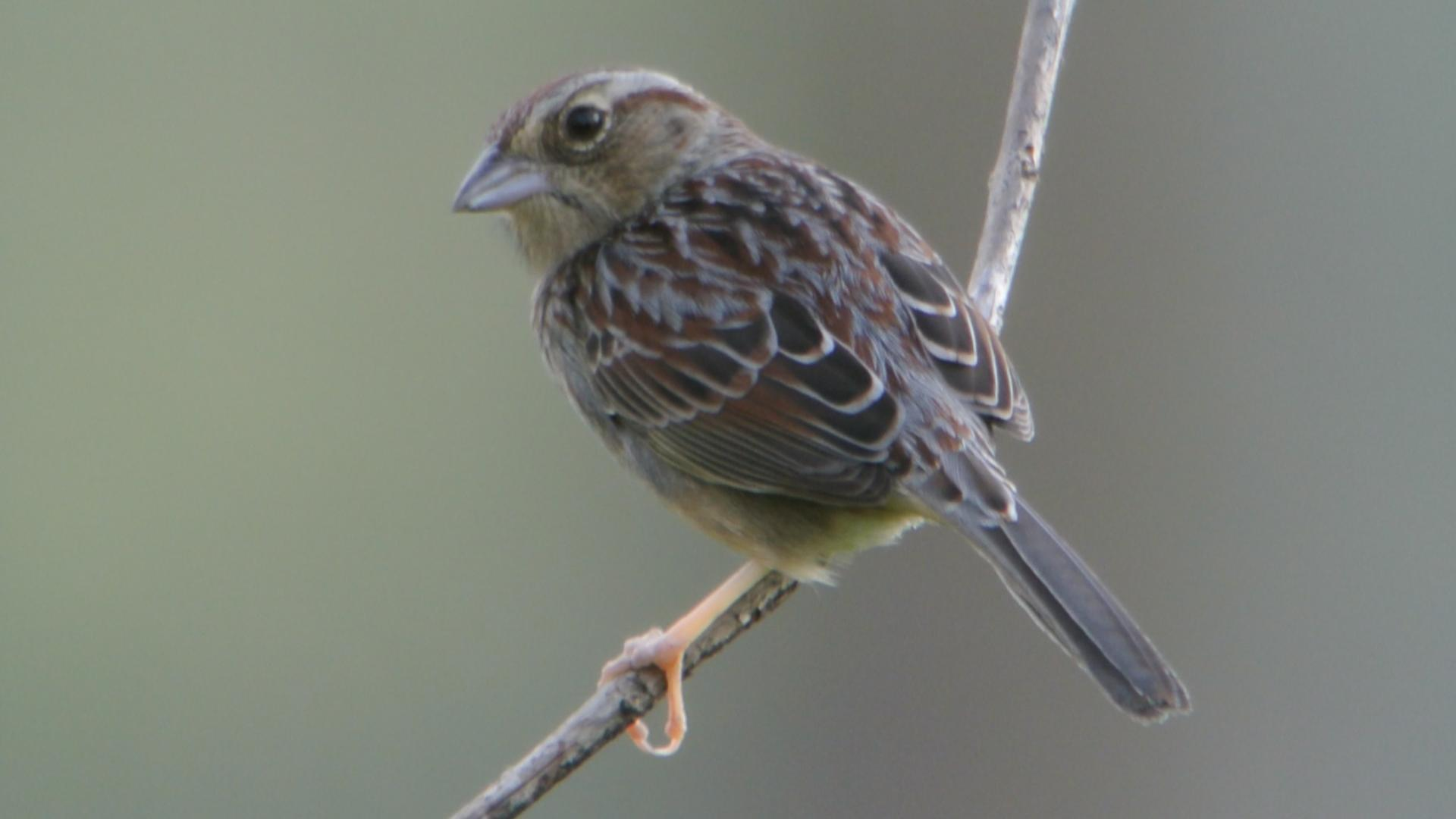
Bachman's sparrow (Peucaea aestivalis), Hal Scott Reserve, Florida

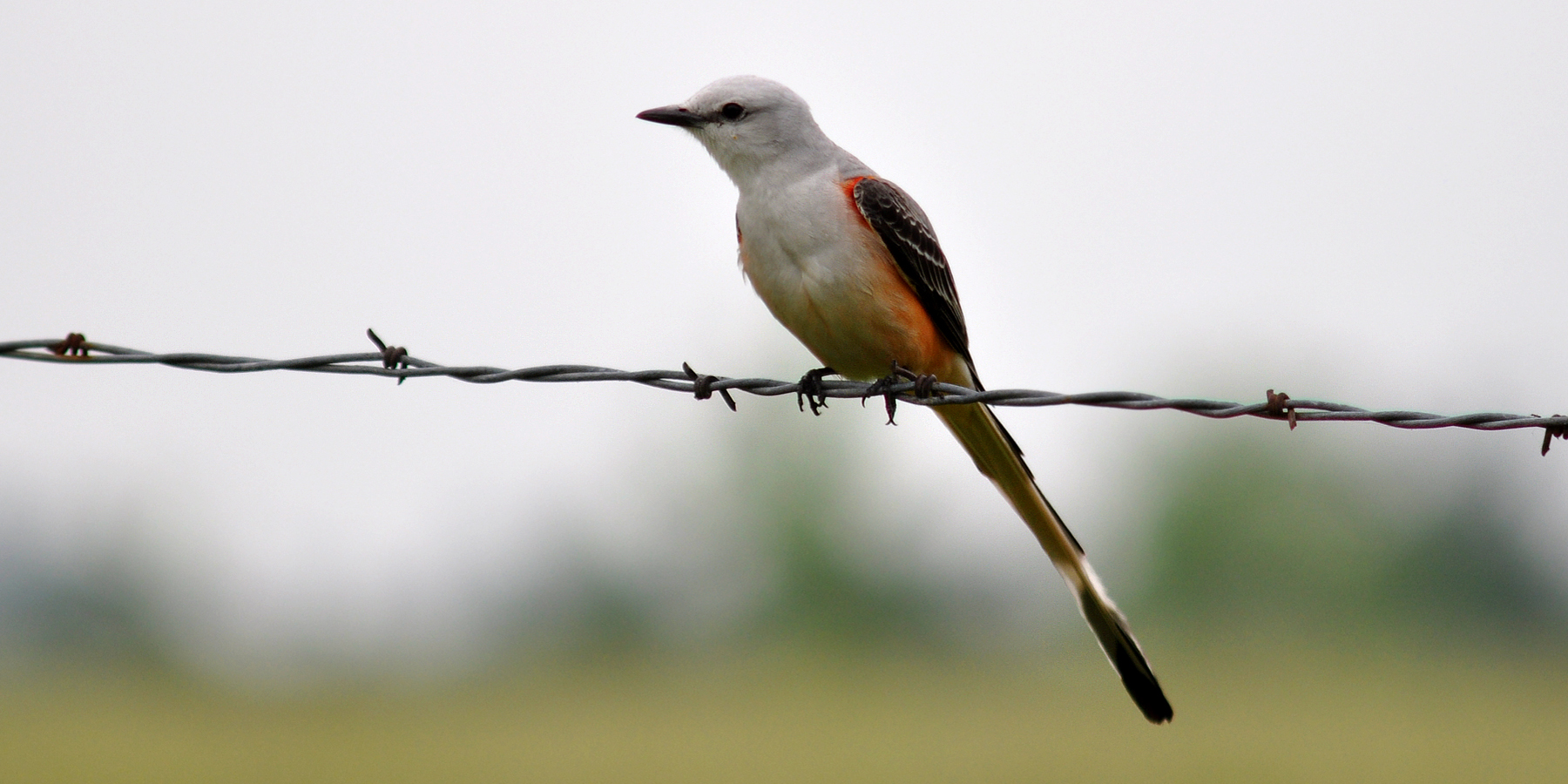
Scissor-tailed flycatcher (Tyrannus forficatus) in Walker County

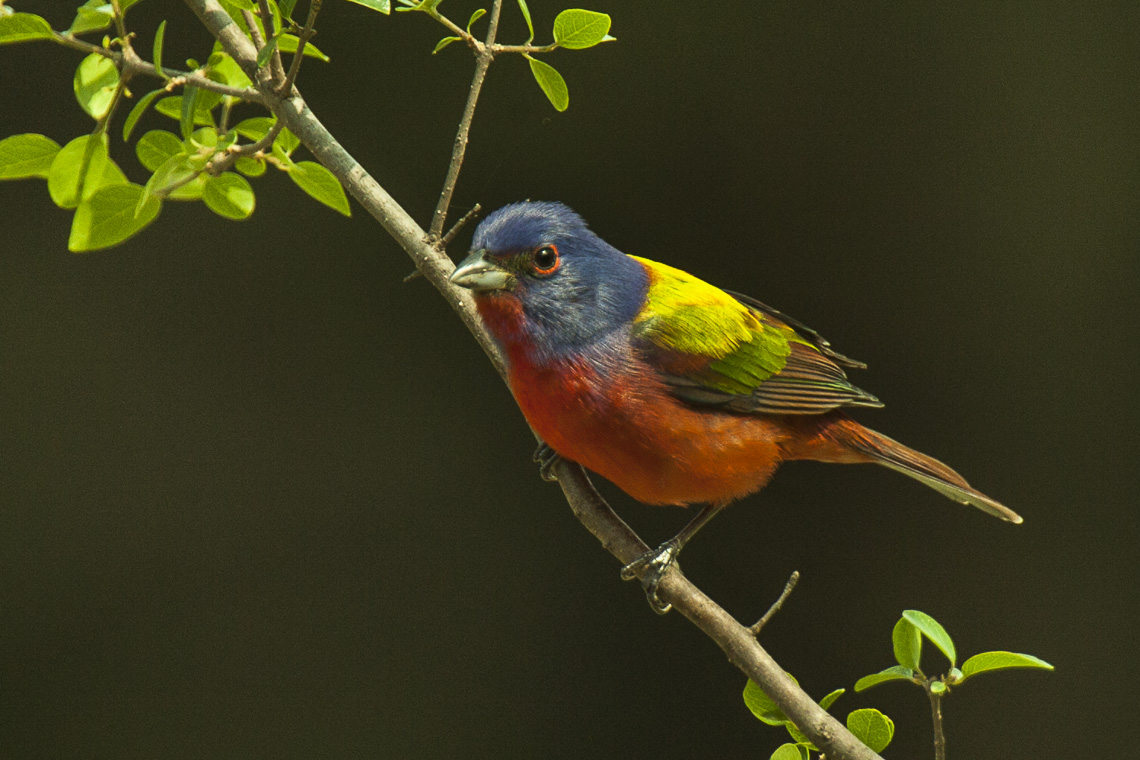
Painted bunting (Passerina ciris), Texas

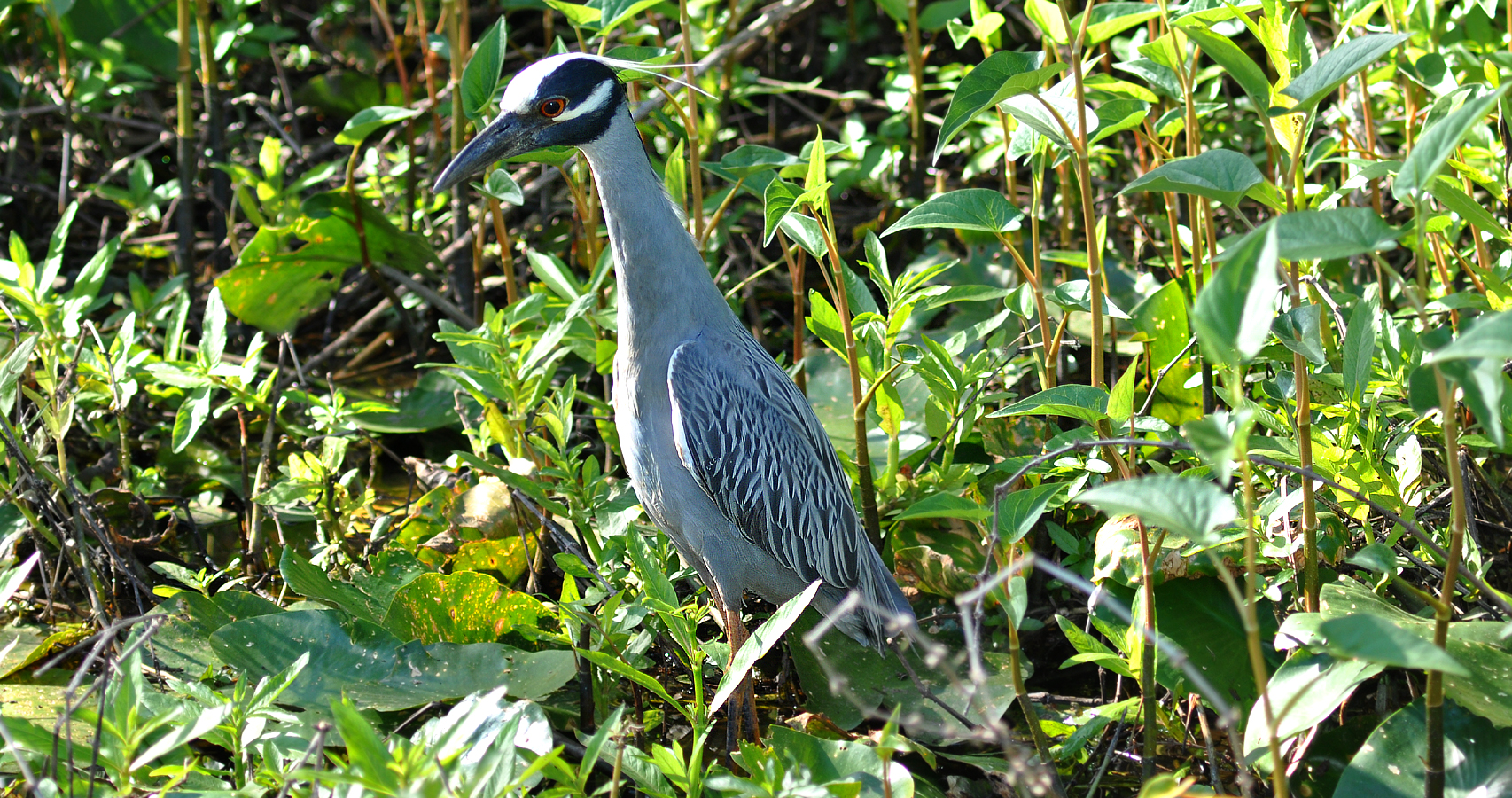
Yellow-crowned night-heron (Nyctanassa violacea) in Harris County

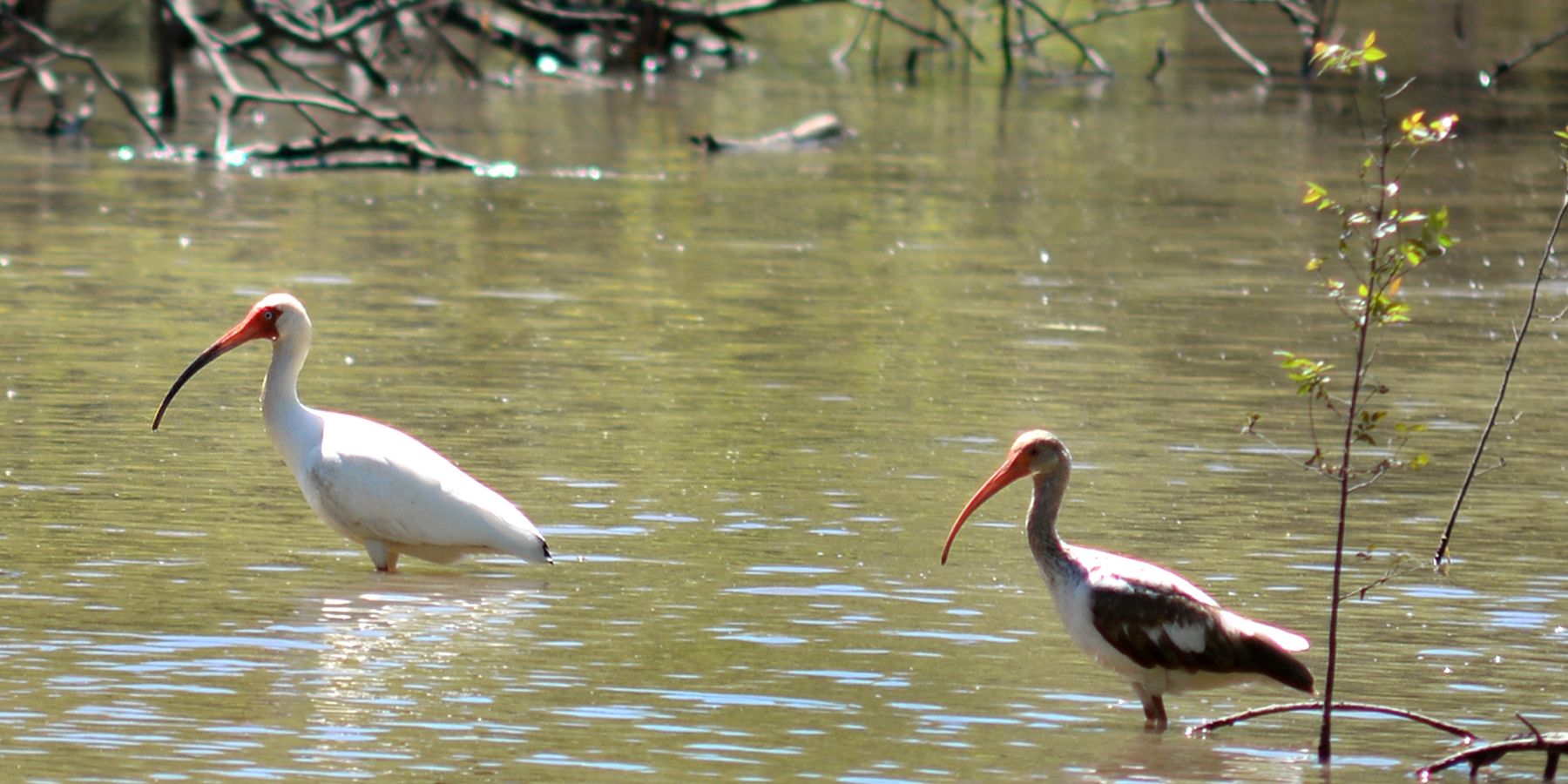
White ibis (Eudocimus albus) adult and immature plumage, Trinity River National Wildlife Refuge

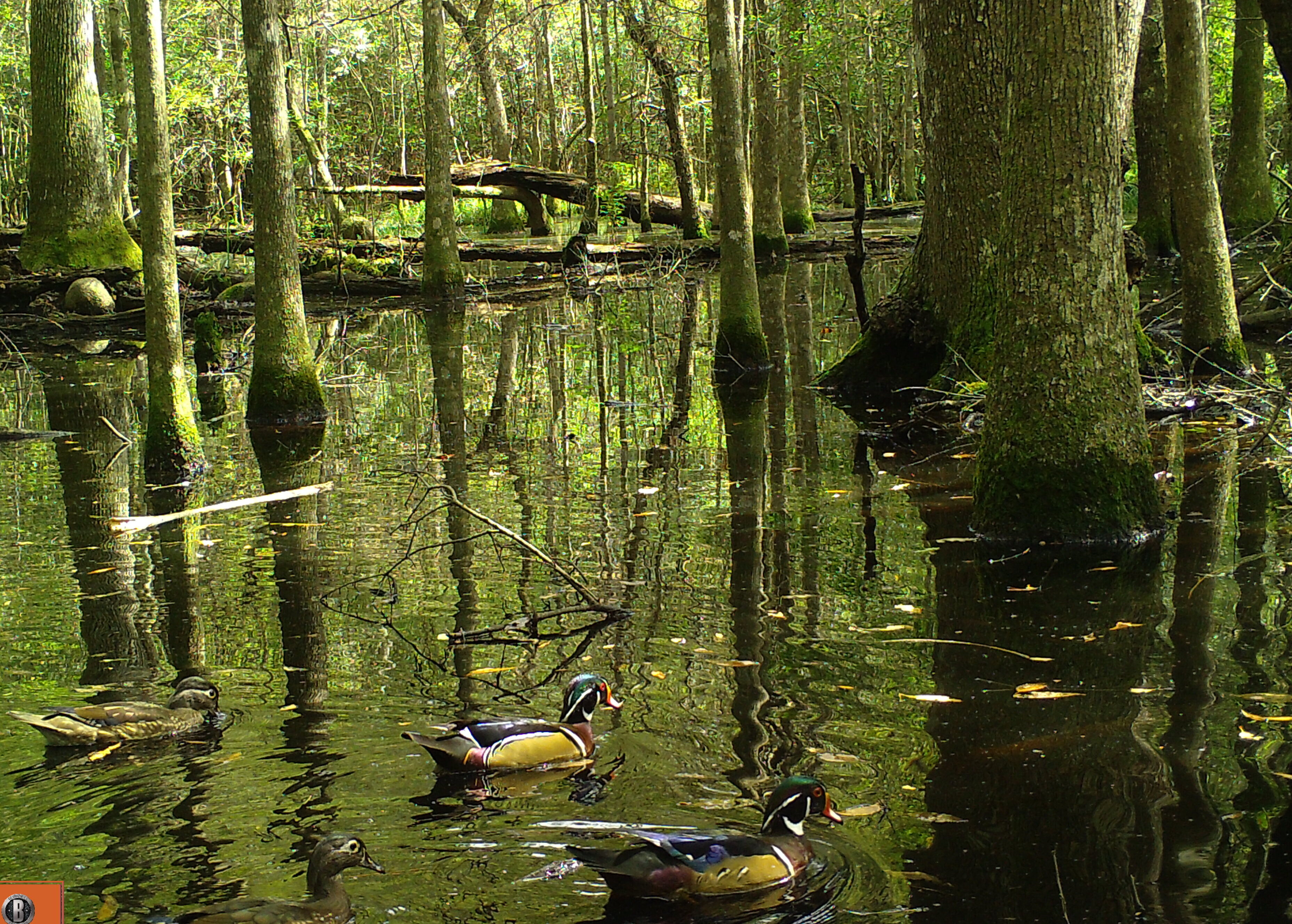
Wood ducks (Aix sponsa), Big Thicket NP, camara trap

Reptiles: Sixty-one species of reptiles are known from the Big Thicket area including the alligator, 15 turtles, 12 lizards, and 33 snakes. Along with birds, reptiles are among the more commonly seen wildlife and they are an important part of the forest community or ecosystems. The American alligator (Alligator mississippiensis), although somewhat uncommon, occurs throughout the Big Thicket where sufficient water is found. However, alligators are abundant in the open marshland of Chambers and Jefferson counties to the south, where they bask in the sun unobstructed by forest trees.

Turtle diversity in the American Gulf Coast states is among the highest in the world. The red-eared slider (Trachemys scripta) is the most common of the pond and river turtles, although river cooters (Pseudemys concinna), Mississippi map turtles (Graptemys pseudogeographica), Sabine map turtles (Graptemys sabinensis), and the rare chicken turtle (Deirochelys reticularia) all occur there. The worldwide distribution of the Sabine map turtle is limited to the Sabine and Neches rivers and adjacent drainages of southwest Louisiana. The once ubiquitous and abundant three-toed box turtle (Terrapene carolina) is still occasionally encountered in east Texas but its numbers plummeted in the late twentieth century, while the ornate box turtle (Terrapene ornata), at its eastern range limits, is known from a few county records in the area, as is the yellow mud turtle (Kinosternon flavescens). The Mississippi mud turtle (Kinosternon subrubrum), razorback musk turtle (Sternotherus carinatus), and common musk turtle (Sternotherus odoratus) spend much of their time foraging at the bottom of the murky waters but, occasionally can be seen basking or even on land moving between streams and ponds. Powerful swimmers, the largely aquatic spiny soft-shelled turtle (Apalone spinifera) is found throughout the region, while the smooth soft-shelled turtle (Apalone mutica) prefers the larger rivers, creeks, and bayous. The snapping turtle family (Chelydridae) is found only in the New World with two genera, both represented in the Big Thicket, the common snapping turtle (Chelydra serpentina) and the alligator snapping turtle (Macrochelys temminckii). The alligator snapping turtle is the largest freshwater turtle in North America and one of the larger freshwater turtles in the world. One record sized individual with a 31.5-inch (80 cm) shell has been documented, and another 251-pound (114 kg) captive specimen recorded, however, 35–100 pounds (16–45 kg) and 12–20 inches (30–51 cm) is the typical adult size. Alligator snapping turtles are protected as a threatened species in Texas.

Lizards commonly seen include green anoles (Anolis carolinensis), five-lined skinks (Plestiodon fasciatus), broad-headed skinks (Plestiodon laticeps), ground skinks (Scincella lateralis), and prairie lizards (Sceloporus consobrinus). Six-lined race runners (Aspidoscelis sexlineatus) are not uncommon, but limited to open areas with sandy soils, whereas the legless western slender glass lizard (Ophisaurus attenuatus) prefers areas of dense grasses with sandy soils. Three lizards barely range into peripheral counties, including two rare skinks, the southern prairie skink (Plestiodon septentrionalis) in the west and the coal skink (Plestiodon anthracinus) in the northeast; and the Texas spiny lizard (Sceloporus olivaceus), common to the west, but rare in a few western Big Thicket counties. Most records of the state reptile, the Texas horned lizard (Phrynosoma cornutum), from east Texas are from the early and mid-twentieth century when they were popular pets, and are thought to represent released or escaped pets and not the species natural range. Two invasive species, the brown anole (Anolis sagrei) and the nocturnal Mediterranean gecko (Hemidactylus turcicus), are found there.

Reptile gallery

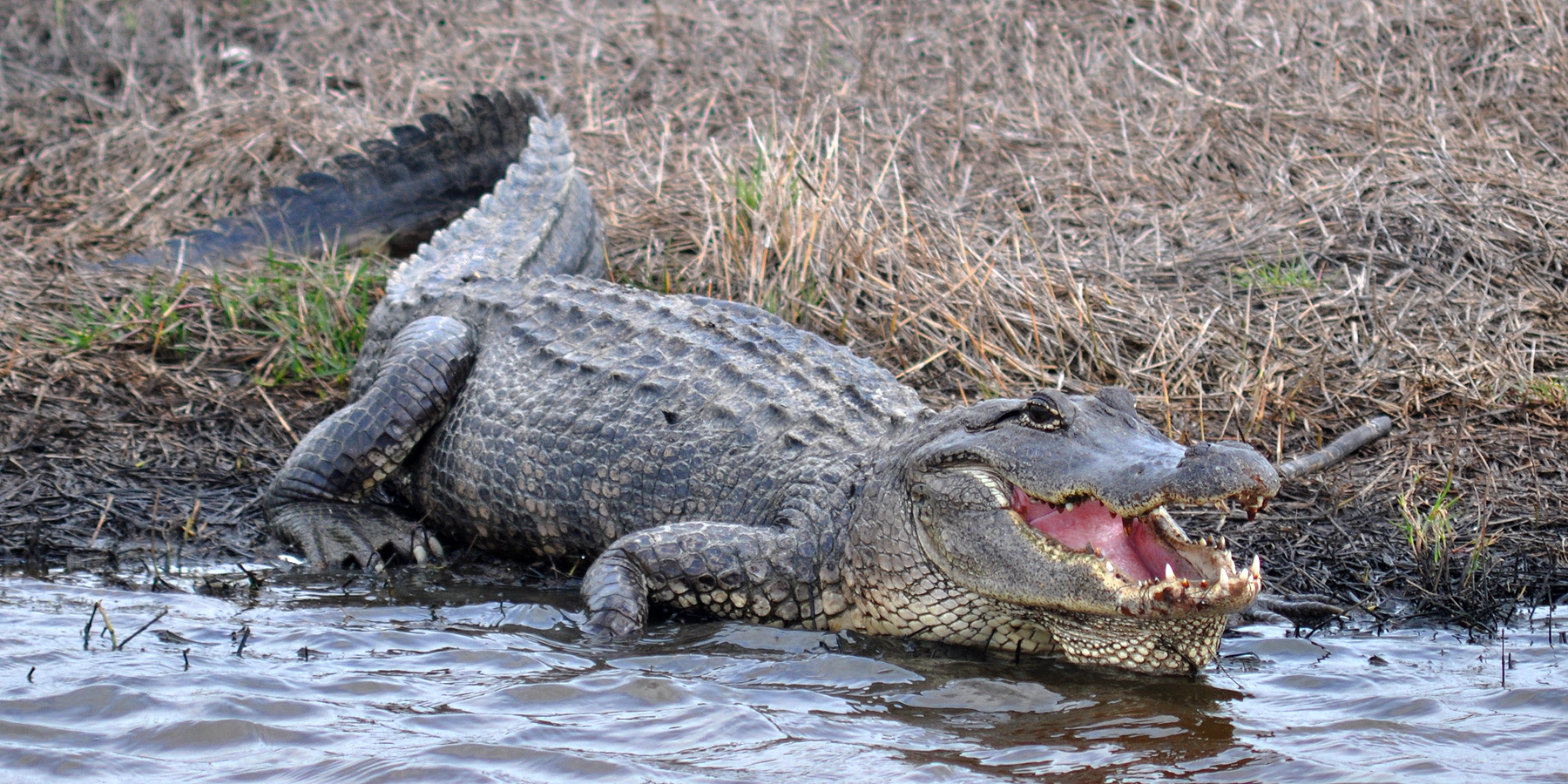
American alligator (Alligator mississippiensis) in Chambers County

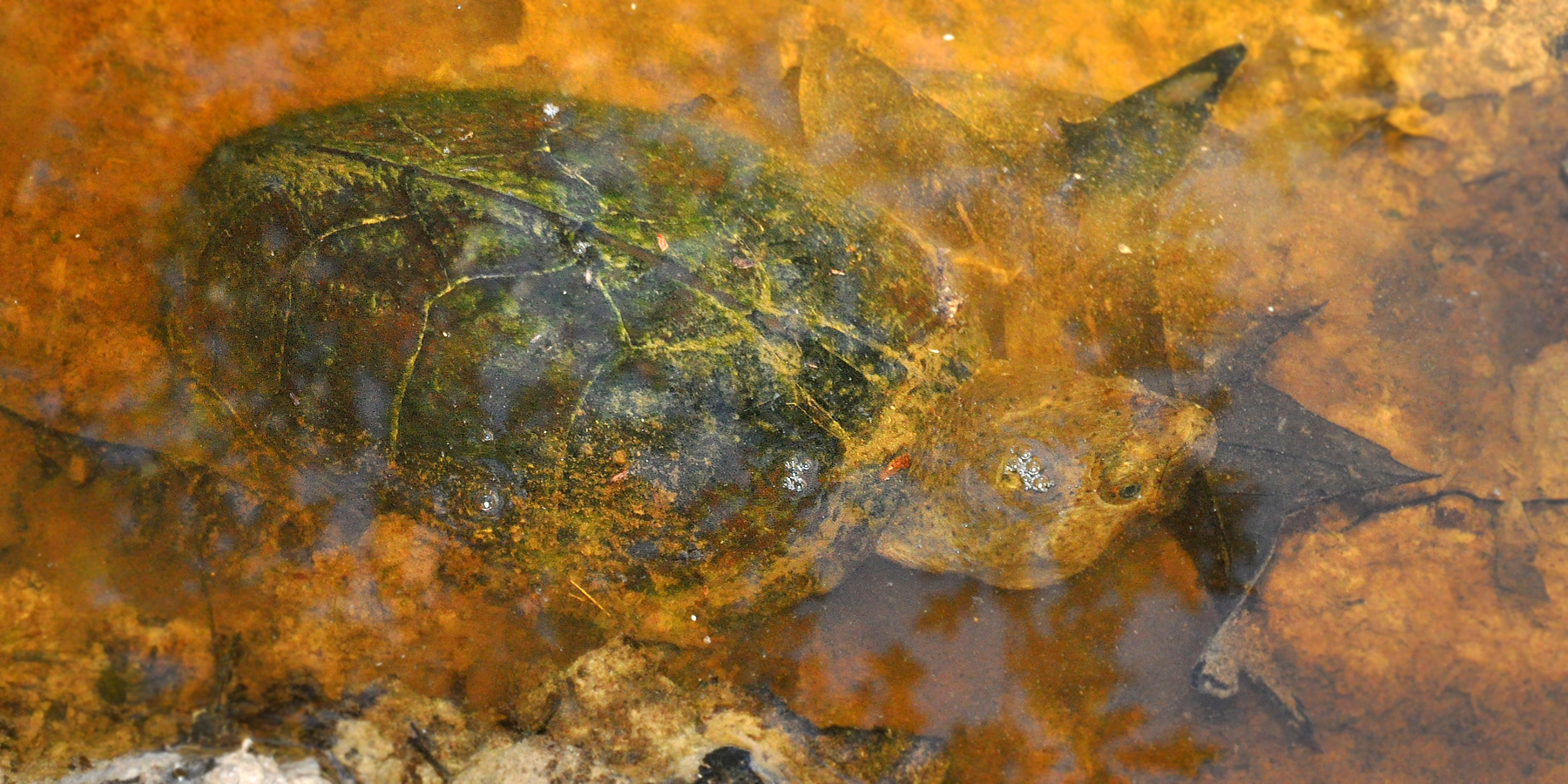
Razorback musk turtle (Sternotherus carinatus) in Hardin County

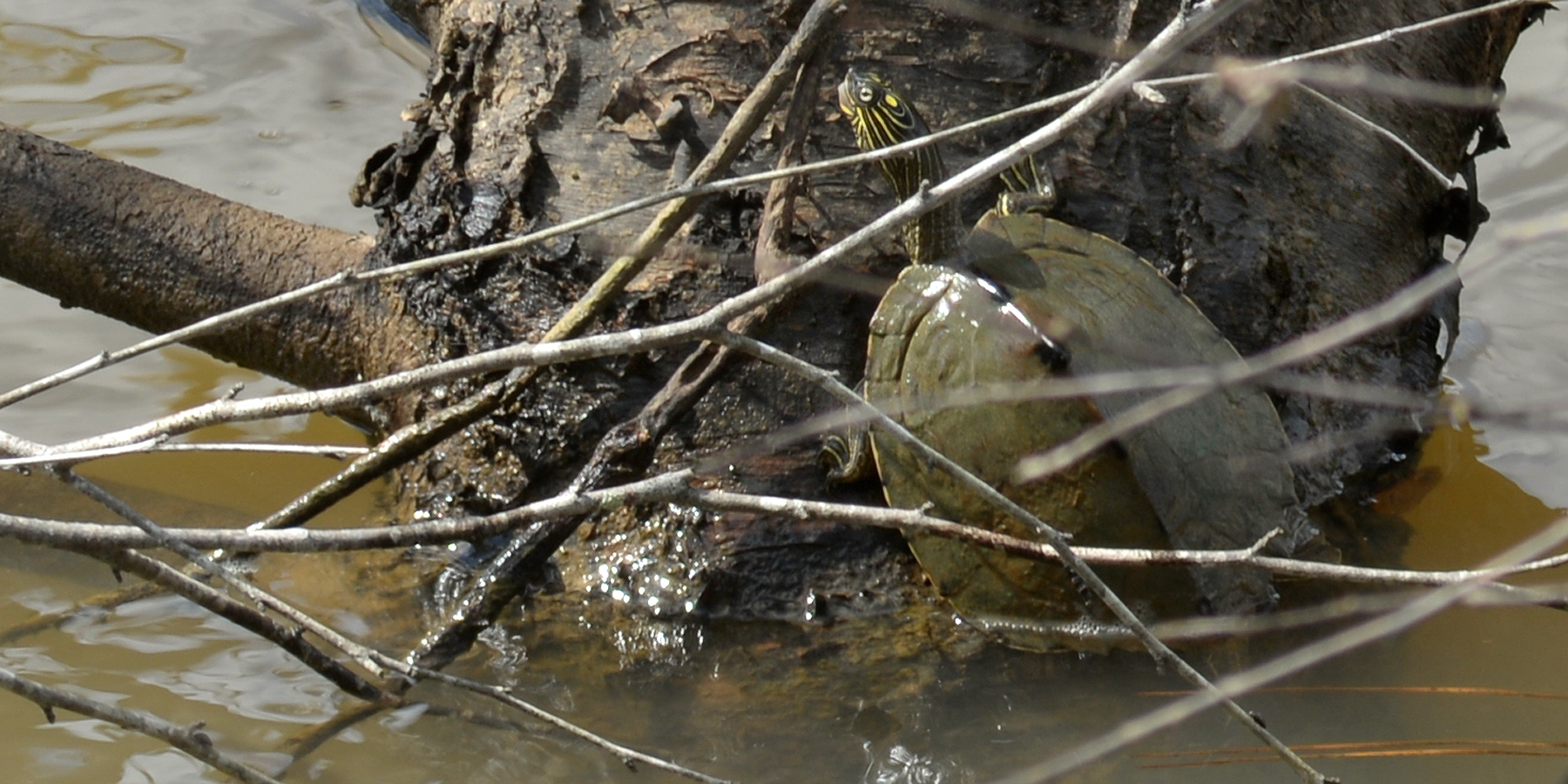
Sabine map turtle (Graptemys sabinensis) in Orange County

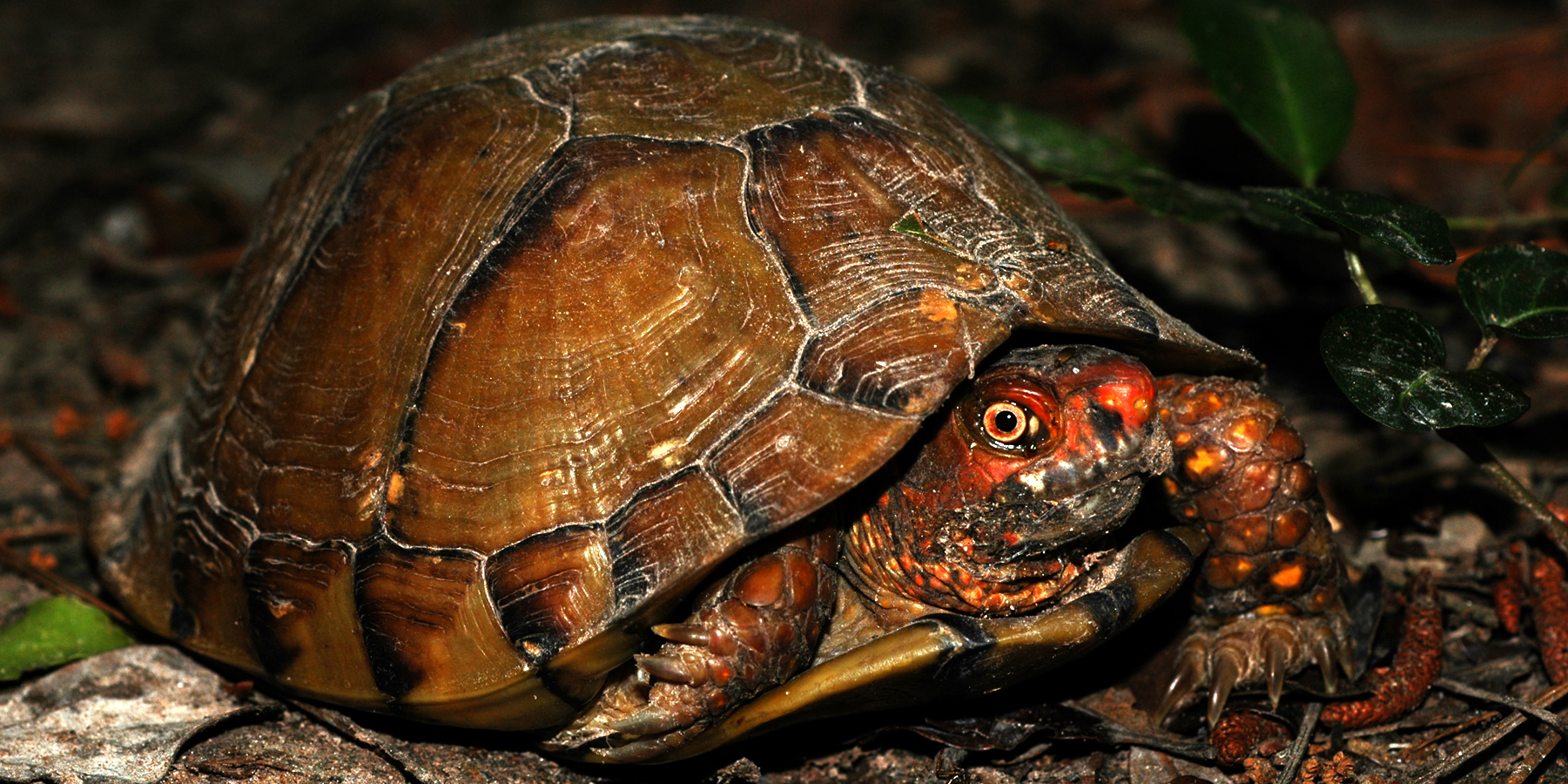
Three-toed box turtle (Terrapene carolina) in Walker County

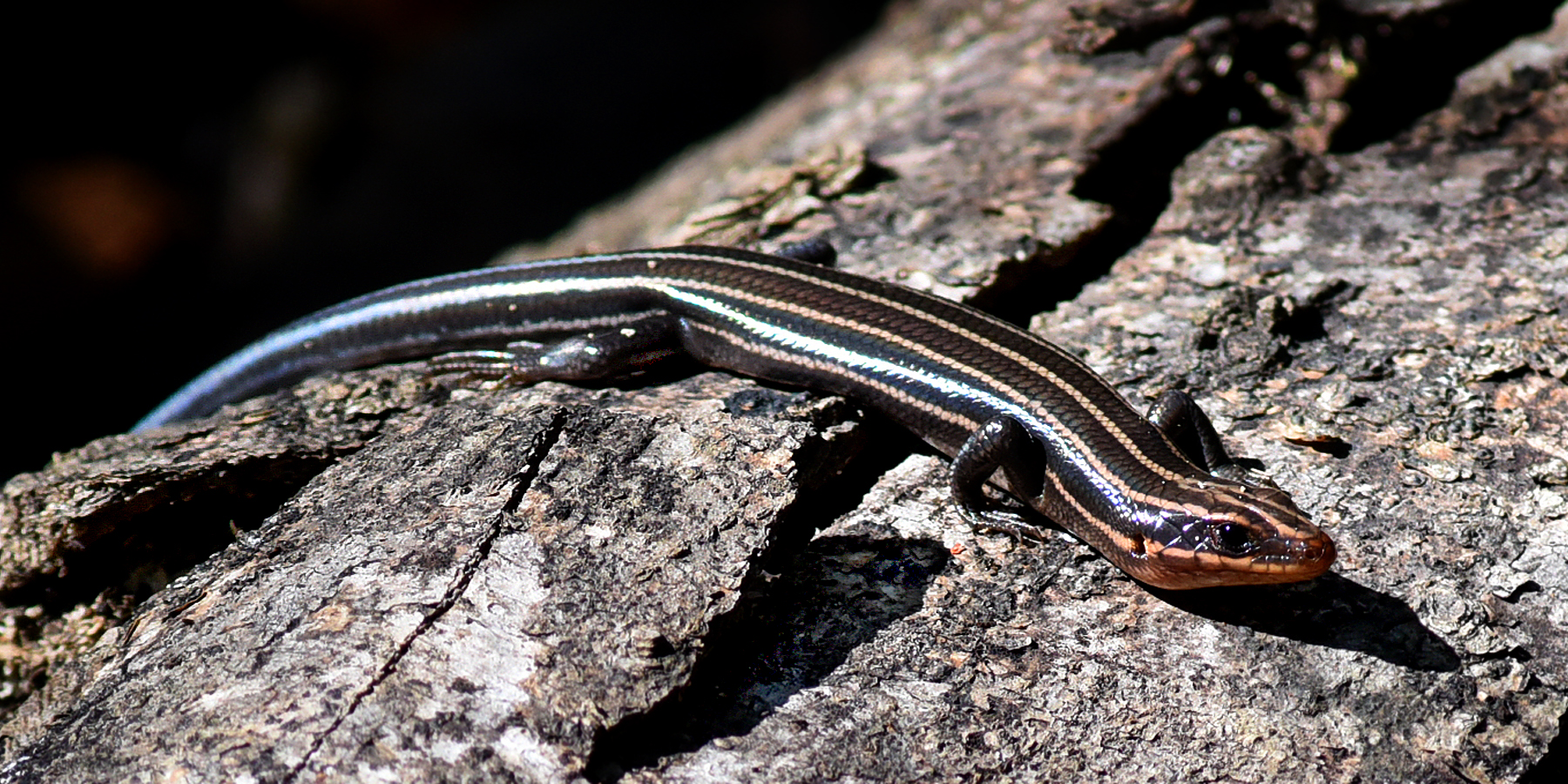
Five-lined skink (Plestiodon fasciatus) in Liberty County

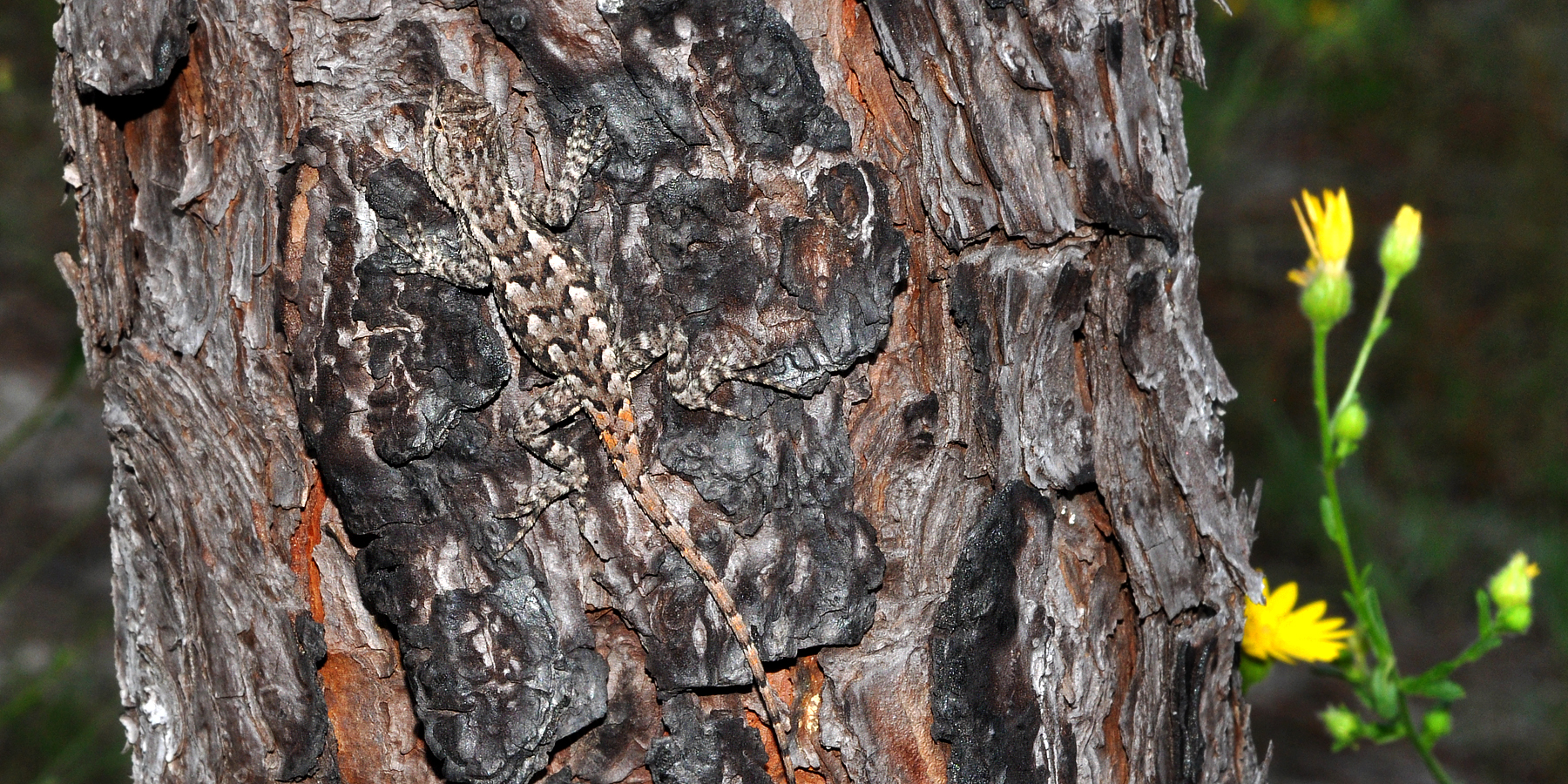
Prairie lizard (Sceloporus consobrinus) in Hardin County

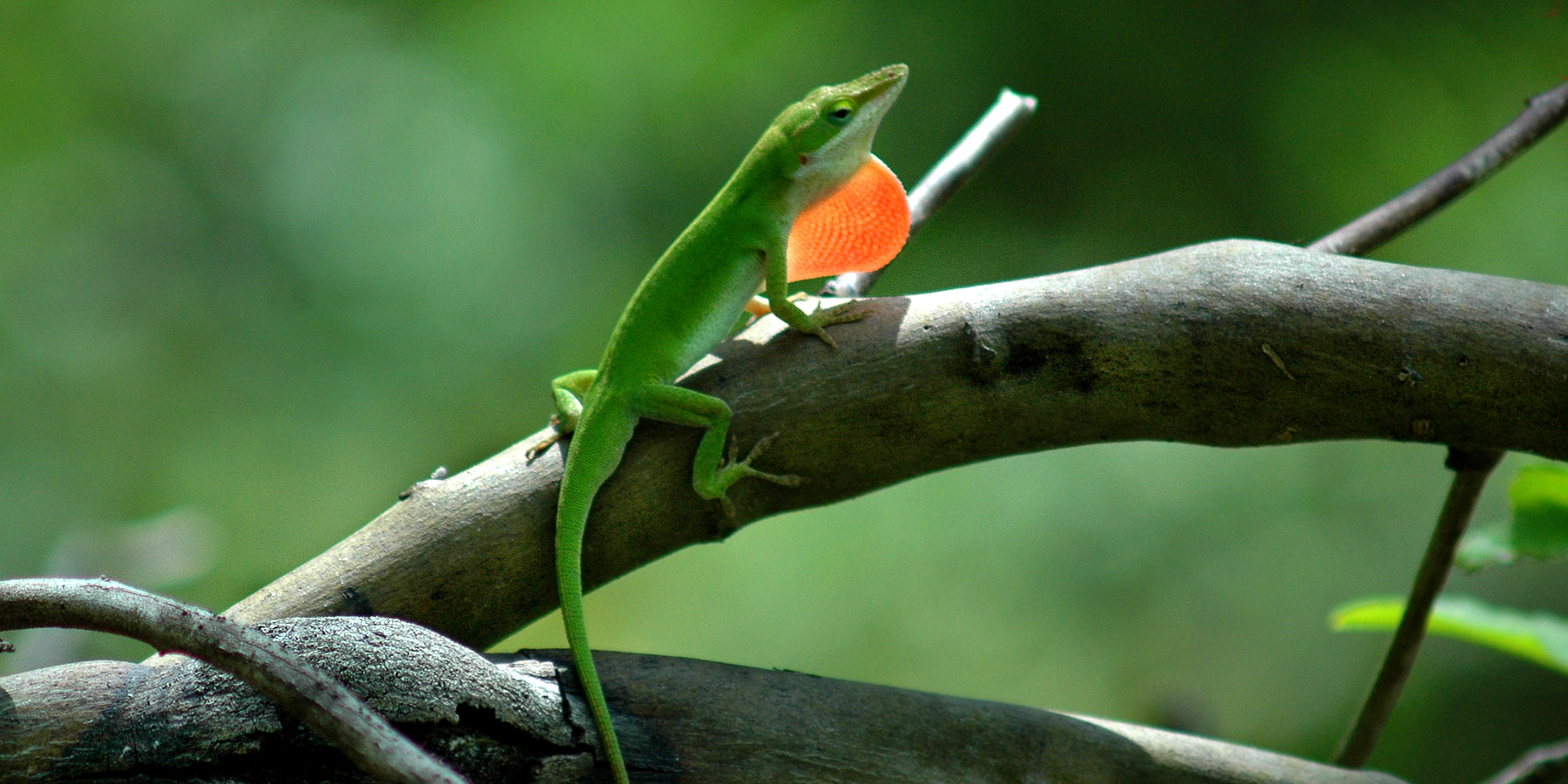
Green anole (Anolis carolinensis) in Polk County

Snakes: With 33 species, the highest diversity among the reptiles are the snakes. Some of the more common species include the eastern hognose snake (Heterodon platirhinos), brown snake (Storeria dekayi), western ribbon snake (Thamnophis proximus), and the rough greensnake (Opheodrys aestivus). Two large, common, but harmless species, the coachwhip snake (Masticophis flagellum) and the Texas rat snake (Pantherophis obsoletus), both commonly grow to 42 inches (110 cm); 60-inch (150 cm) individuals are not rare, and they occasionally grow even larger. The North American racer (Coluber constrictor) occurs in three color variations in the Big Thicket, some recognize them as subspecies, the buttermilk racer (C. c. anthicus), the yellow-bellied racer (C. c. flaviventris), and the tan racer (C. c. etheridgei). The harmless watersnakes bear a resemblance and share habitats with venomous cottonmouths, including three common species, the yellow-bellied watersnake (Nerodia erythrogaster), southern or broad-banded watersnake (Nerodia fasciata), diamondback watersnake (Nerodia rhombifer), and the uncommon Mississippi green watersnake (Nerodia cyclopion). Some less common species that are occasionally encountered are the western mud snake (Farancia abacura), prairie kingsnake (Lampropeltis calligaster), speckled kingsnake (Lampropeltis holbrooki), Louisiana milk snake (Lampropeltis triangulum), and Slowinski's cornsnake (Pantherophis slowinskii). The rare and endangered Louisiana pine snake (Pituophis ruthveni) is known form historical records in the Big Thicket but might be extirpated from the area now. The Louisiana pine snake is closely associated with the Baird's pocket gopher (Geomys breviceps), both for prey and its burrows for shelter, and both species occupy longleaf pine uplands, savanna, and sandyland, habitat which is dependent on periodic cycles of wildfires to maintain an open understory.

There are five species of venomous snakes in the area. Two rattlesnakes, the pygmy rattlesnake (Sistrurus miliarius) and the canebrake or timber rattlesnake (Crotalus horridus) are both uncommon to rare. Timber rattlesnakes are a threatened species in Texas, as they are in most states where they occur and are protected by state laws. The Texas coral snake (Micrurus tener) is not uncommon however, they are secretive, often fossorial, and seldom seen. Two of the most common snakes, venomous or non-venomous, are the copperhead (Agkistrodon contortrix) and cottonmouth (Agkistrodon piscivorus).

Snake gallery

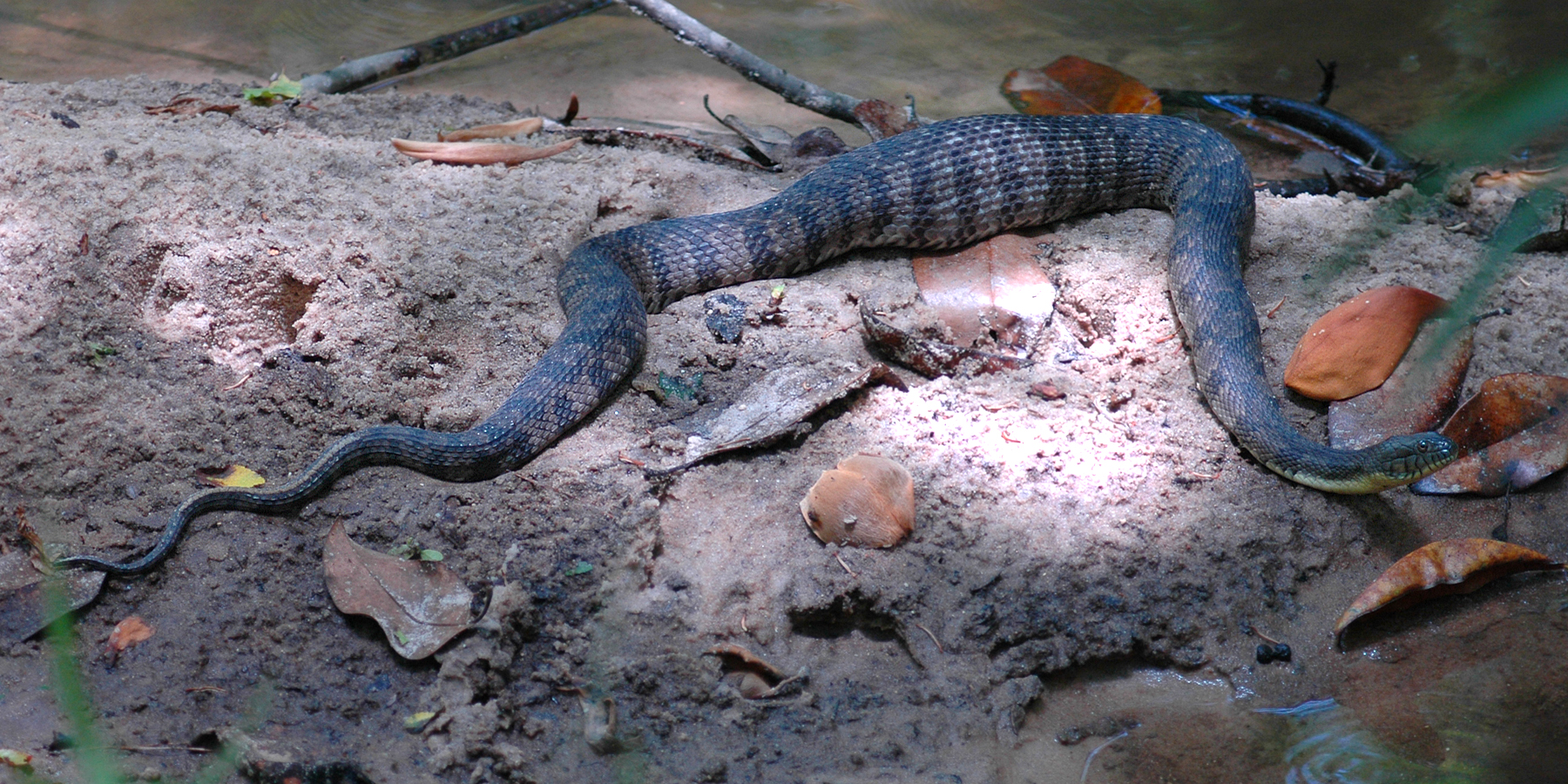
Diamondback watersnake (Nerodia rhombifer) in San Jacinto County

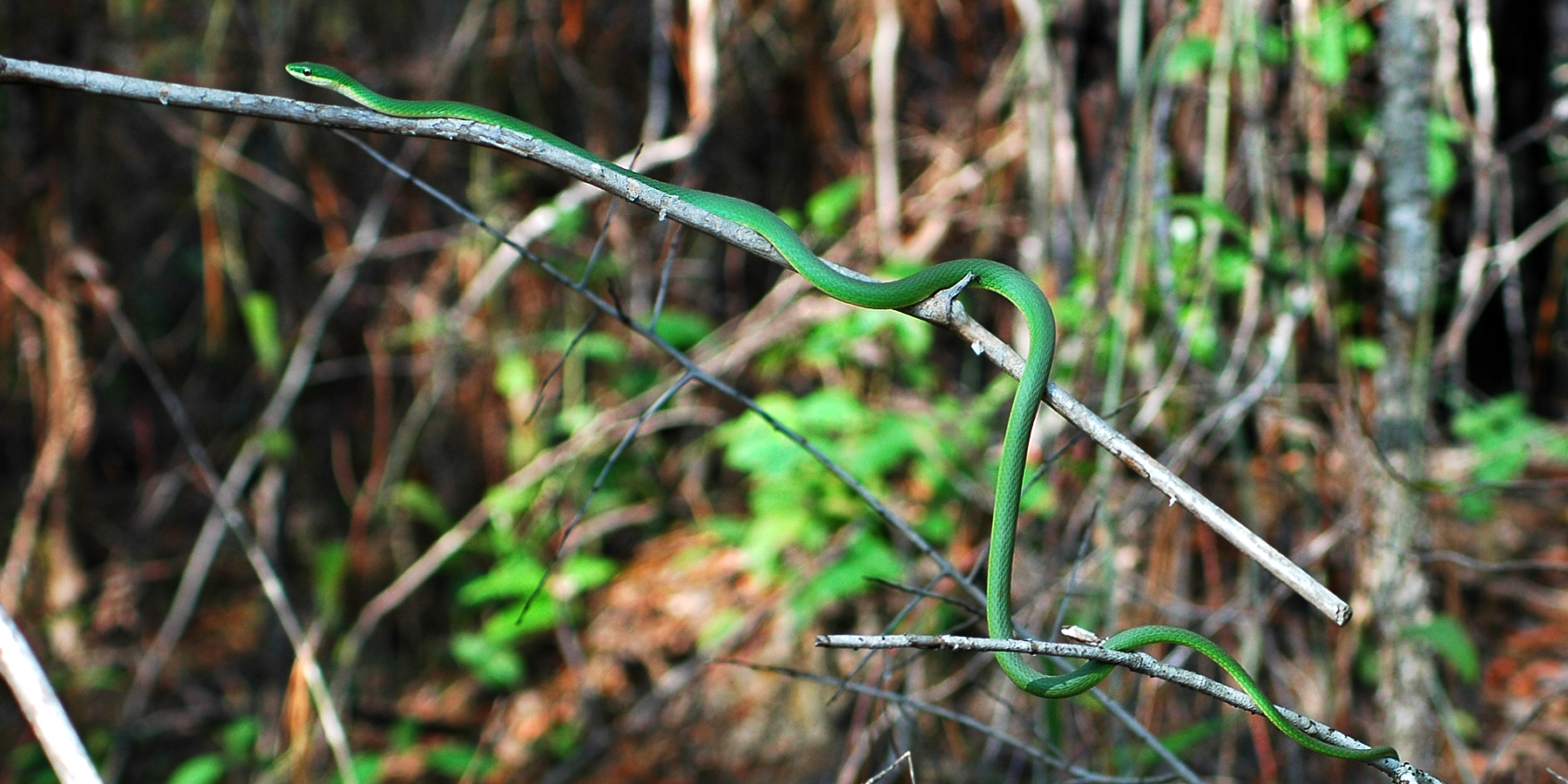
Rough greensnake (Opheodrys aestivus) in Tyler County

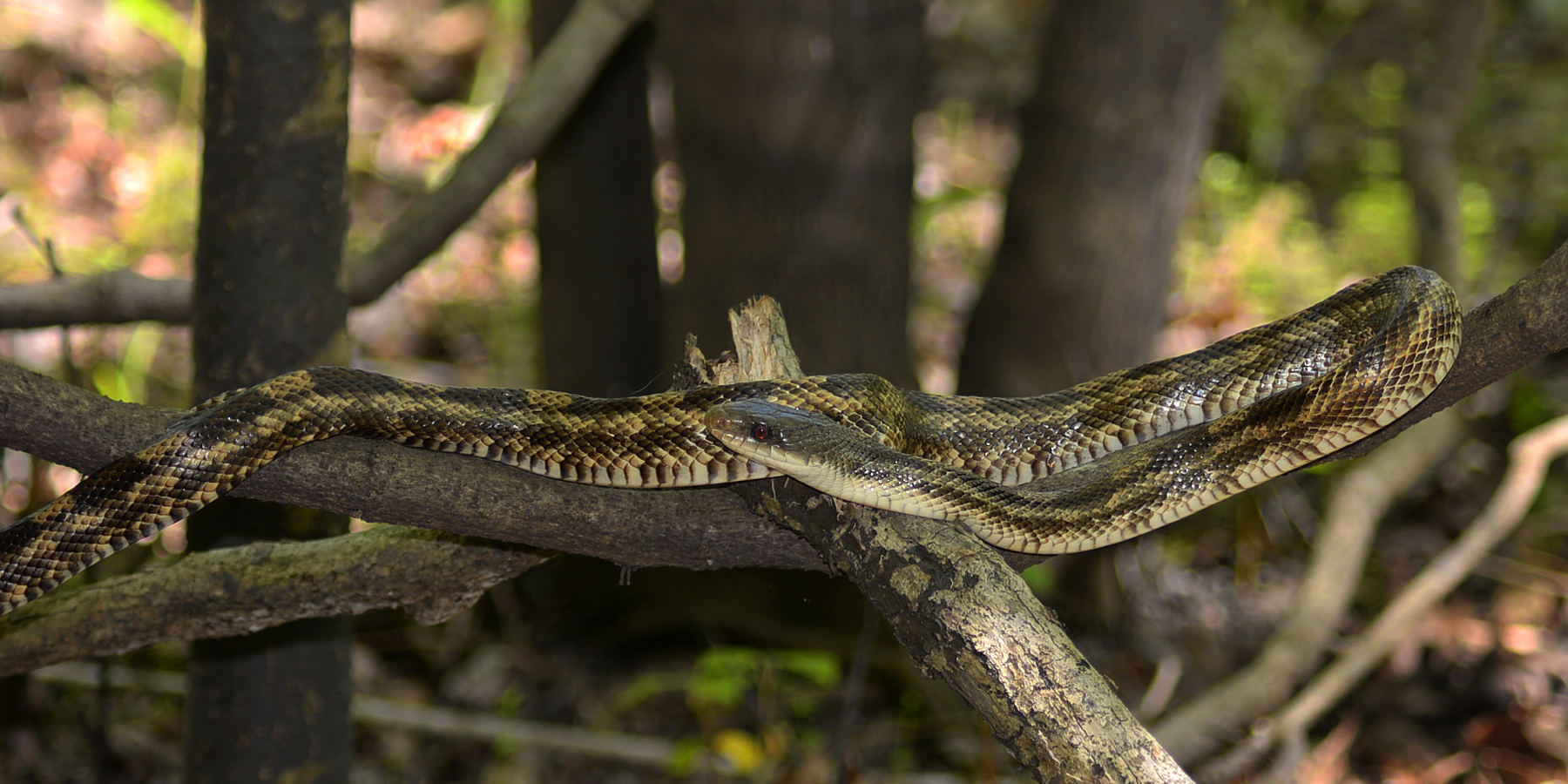
Texas rat snake (Pantherophis obsoletus) in Liberty County

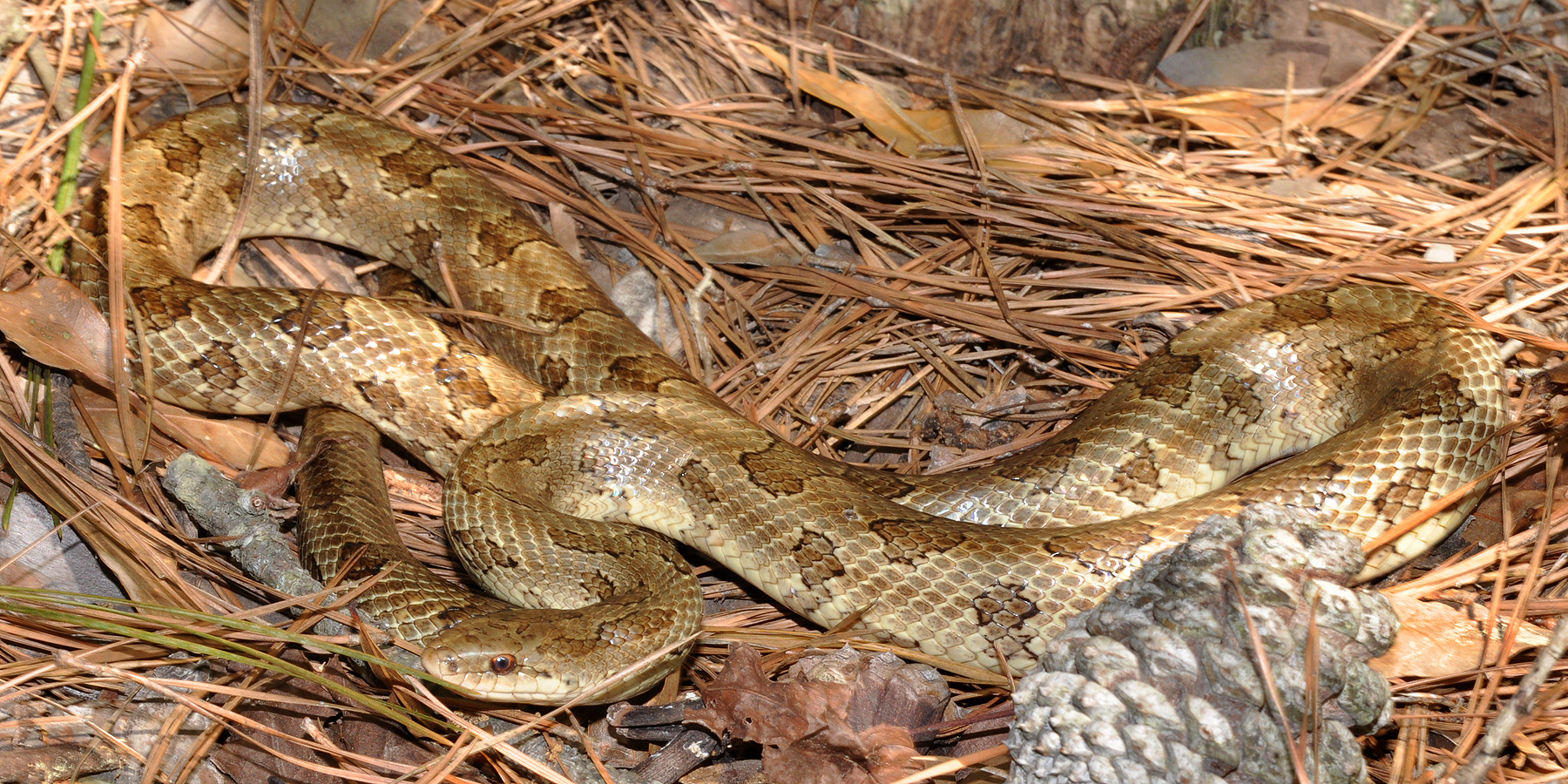
Prairie kingsnake (Lampropeltis calligaster) in Tyler County

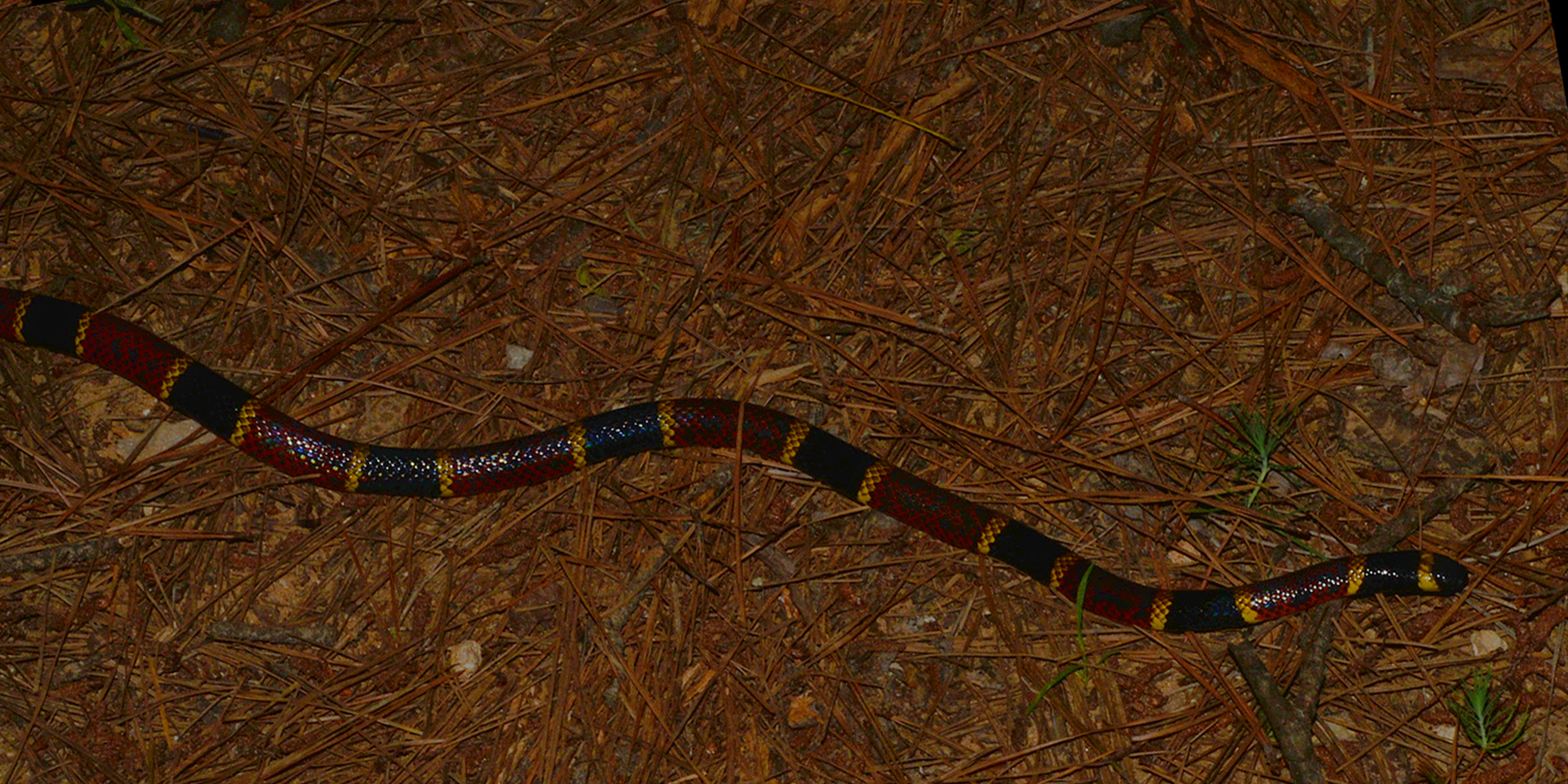
Texas coral snake (Micrurus tener) in Houston County

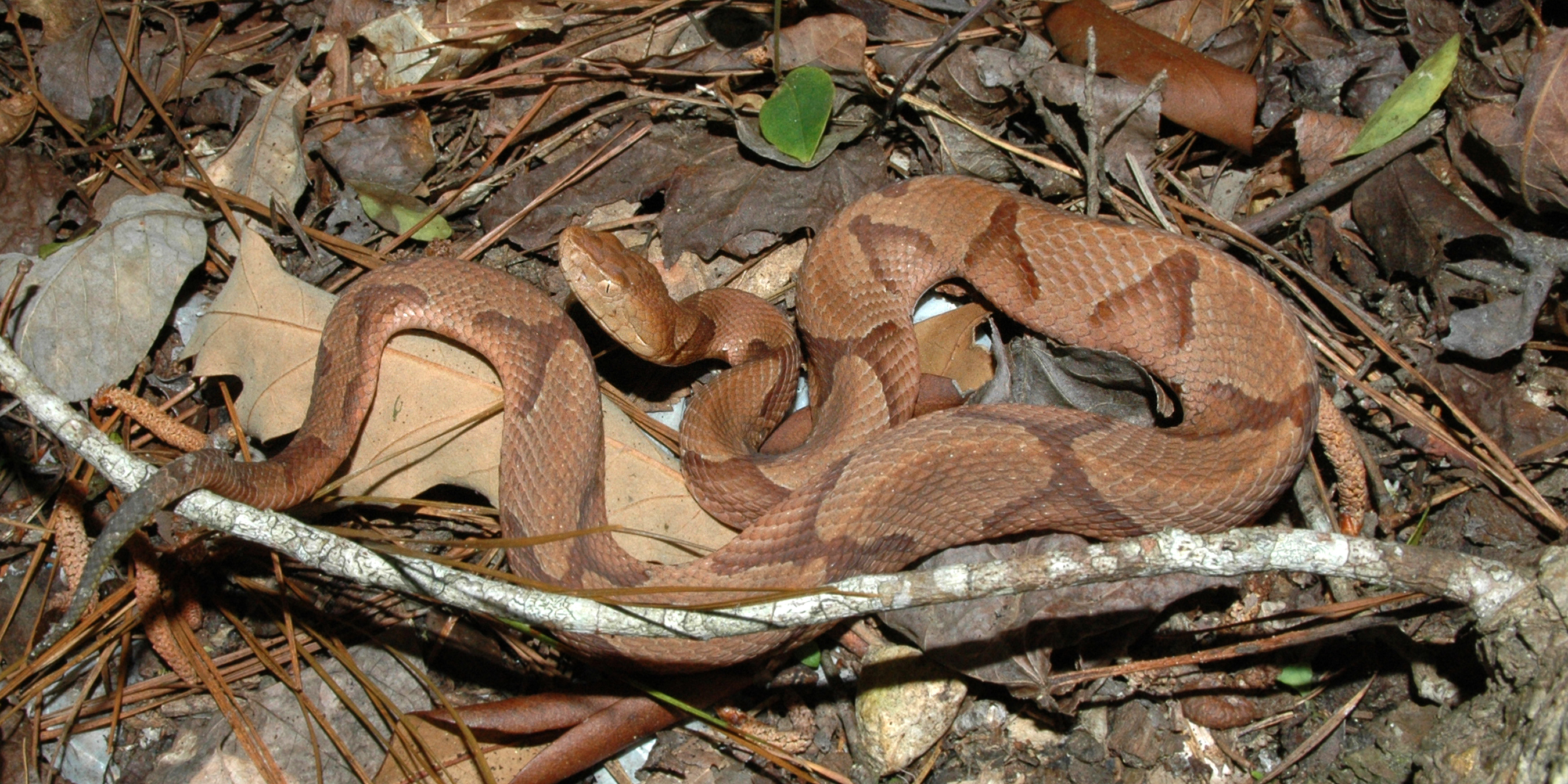
Copperhead (Agkistrodon contortrix) in Liberty County

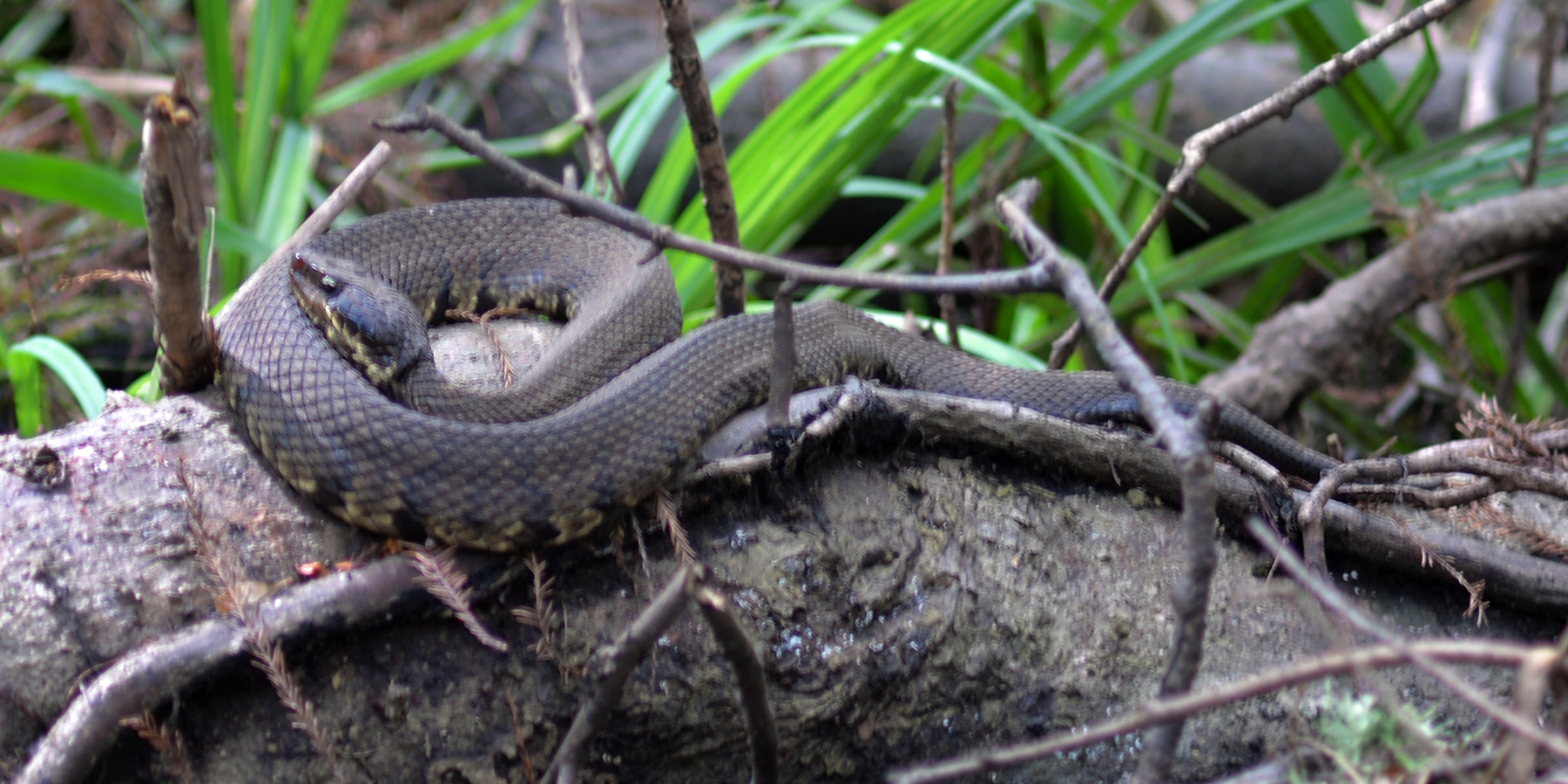
Cottonmouth (Agkistrodon piscivorus) in Liberty County

Amphibians: There are 31 species of amphibians found in the Big Thicket area, including 11 species of salamanders and 20 species of frogs and toads. Some of the more commonly encountered salamanders in the region include the smallmouth salamander (Ambystoma texanum), dwarf salamander (Eurycea quadridigitata), and central newt (Notophthalmus viridescens). The three-toed amphiuma (Amphiuma tridactylum) is one of the larger salamanders in the world and can grow over 30 inches (76 cm). Three salamanders, including the three-toed amphiuma (Amphiuma tridactylum), Gulf Coast water dog (Necturus beyeri), and lesser siren (Siren intermedia), retain their gills from the larva stage and live their entire lives in the muddy waters of east Texas and consequently, although not rare, are seldom seen except by an occasional fisherman or those who specifically go look for them. Likewise, mole salamanders (members of the genus Ambystoma), including the spotted salamander (Ambystoma maculatum), marbled salamander (Ambystoma opacum), mole salamander (Ambystoma talpoideum), and tiger salamander (Ambystoma tigrinum) spend much of their lives underground and are infrequently seen except for few short weeks each year during their breeding seasons. The southern dusky salamander (Desmognathus auriculatus), once widespread in Southeast Texas, now appears to be in serious decline.

Common toads and frogs include the Gulf Coast toad (Incilius nebulifer), Blanchard's cricket frog (Acris blanchardi), green tree frog (Hyla cinerea), squirrel tree frog (Hyla squirella), spring peeper (Pseudacris crucifer), eastern narrow-mouth toad (Gastrophryne carolinensis), American bullfrog (Lithobates catesbeianus), bronze frog (Lithobates clamitans), and southern leopard frog (Lithobates sphenocephalus). Two other frequently encountered tree frogs, Cope's gray tree frog (Hyla chrysoscelis) and the gray tree frog (Hyla versicolor), are identical in appearance and can only be distinguished by subtle differences in their calls or by laboratory analysis. The East Texas toad, commonly seen in the Big Thicket, has been controversial among herpetologist and taxonomist, some arguing that it is a distinct species (Anaxyrus velatus) while others argue that it is a hybrid between Woodhouse's toad (Anaxyrus woodhousii) found to the west and Fowler's toad (Anaxyrus fowleri) found to the east. Two rare and highly secretive frogs are the pickerel frog (Lithobates palustris) and the southern crawfish frog (Lithobates areolatus) which is a fossorial species, spending much of its time in crayfish burrows and other small cavities in the ground. One invasive species, the small Rio Grande chirping frog (Syrrhophus cystignathoides), is native to the Rio Grande Valley and Mexico but, it does not appear pose an ecological threat to other species as invasive species often do.

Amphibian gallery

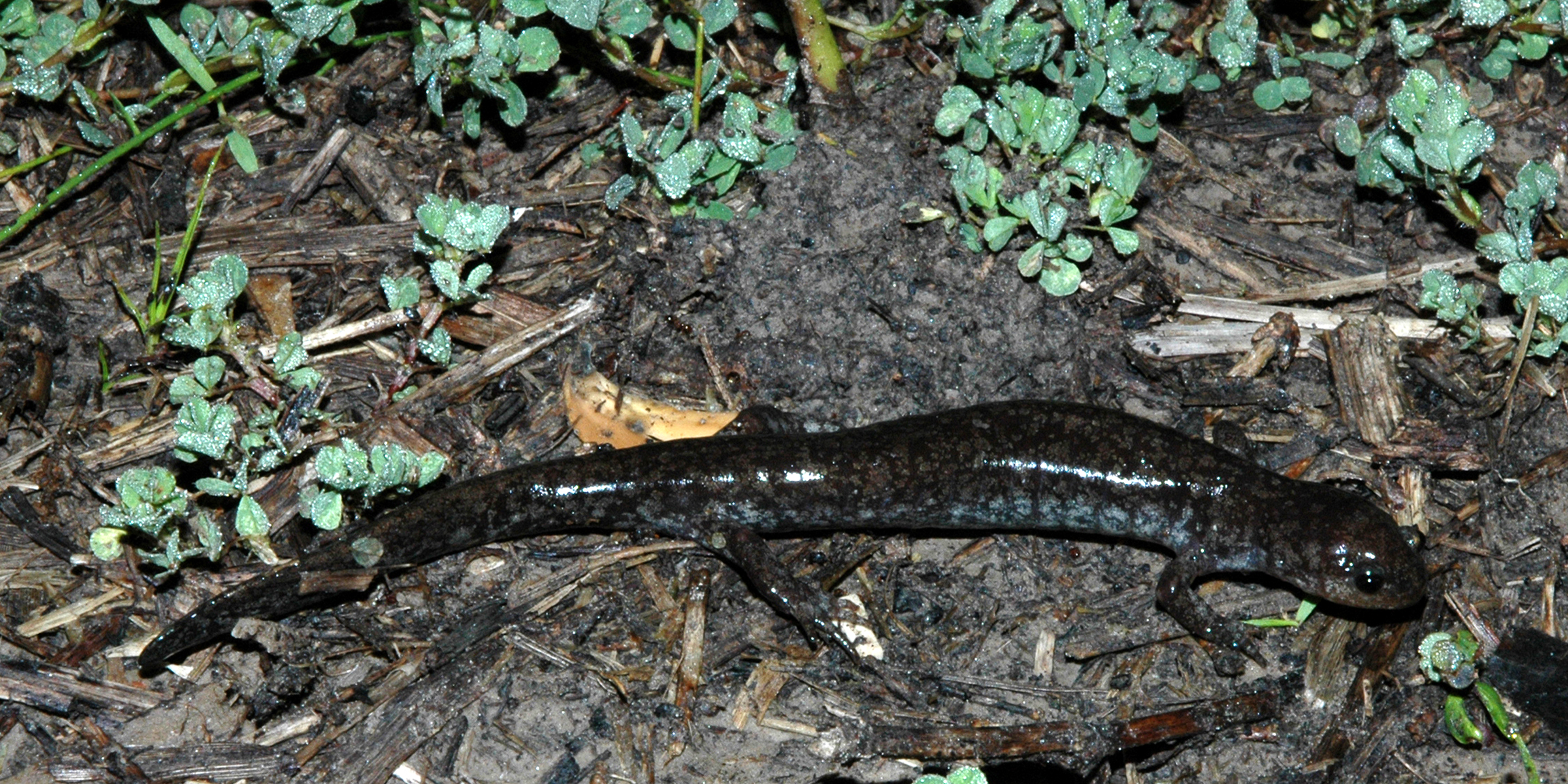
Small-mouthed salamander (Ambystoma texanum) in Liberty County

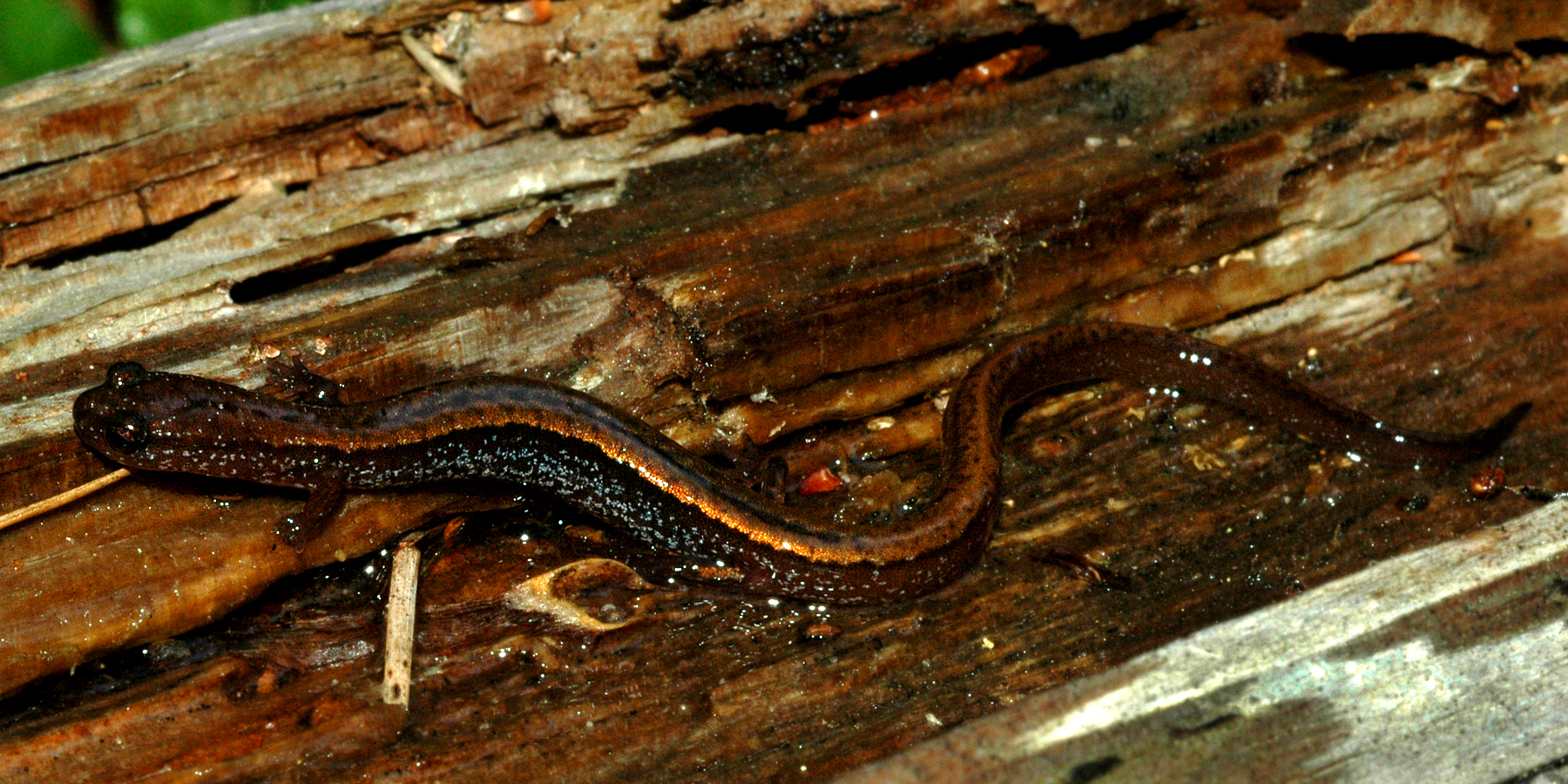
Dwarf salamander (Eurycea quadridigitata) in Polk County

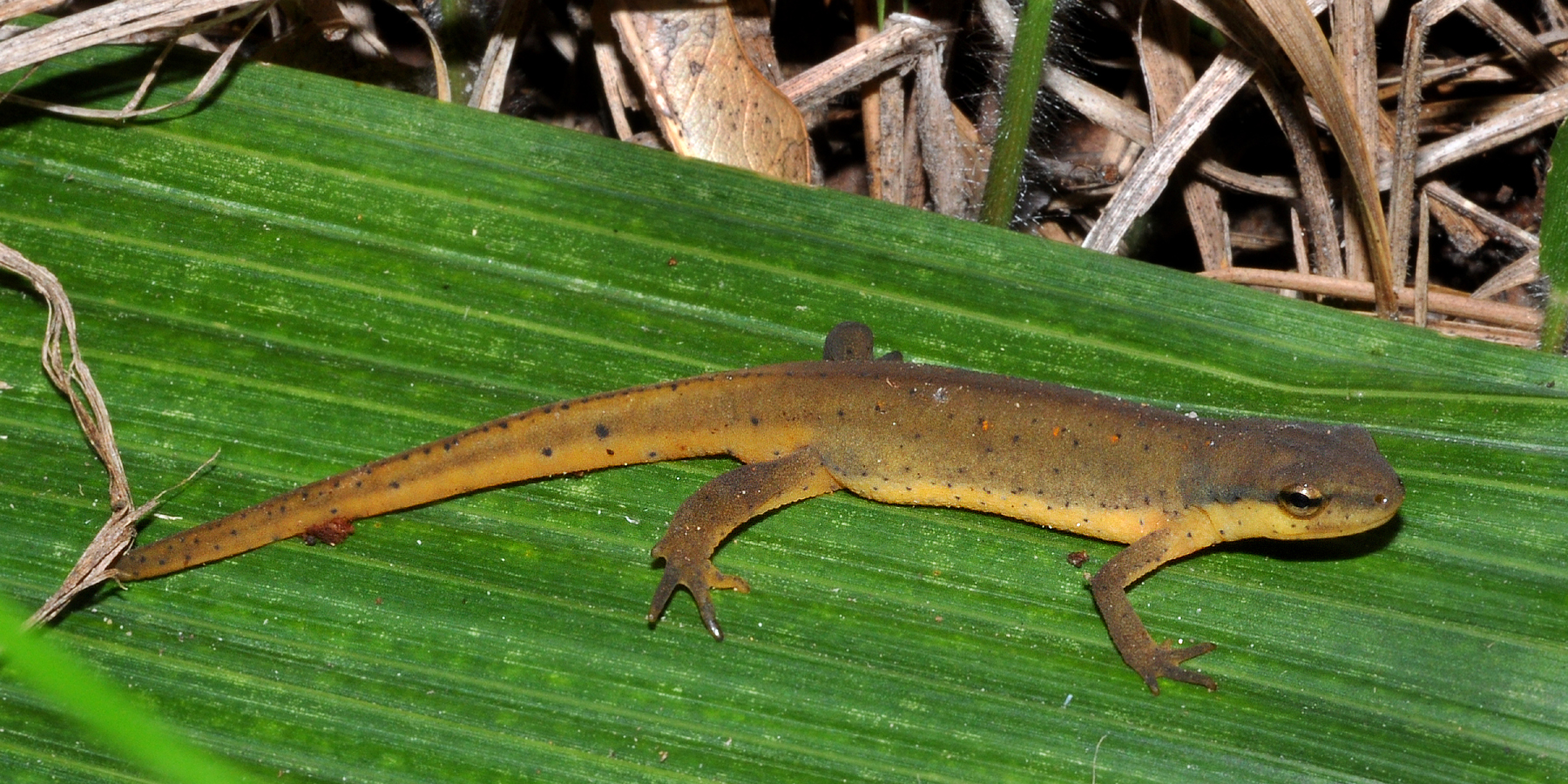
Eastern newt (Notophthalmus viridescens) in Walker County

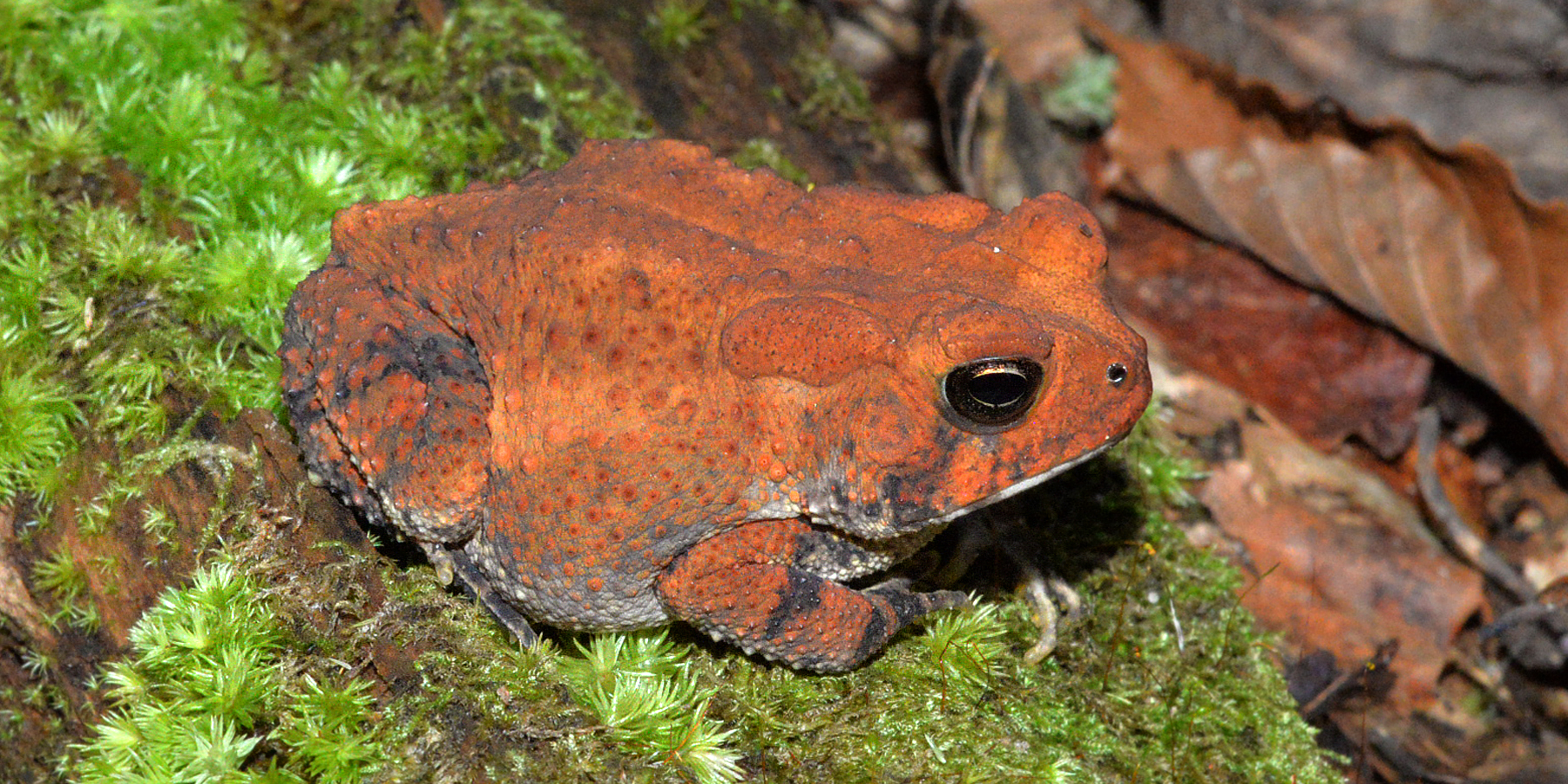
East Texas toad (Anaxyrus velatus or woodhousii × fowleri) in Hardin County

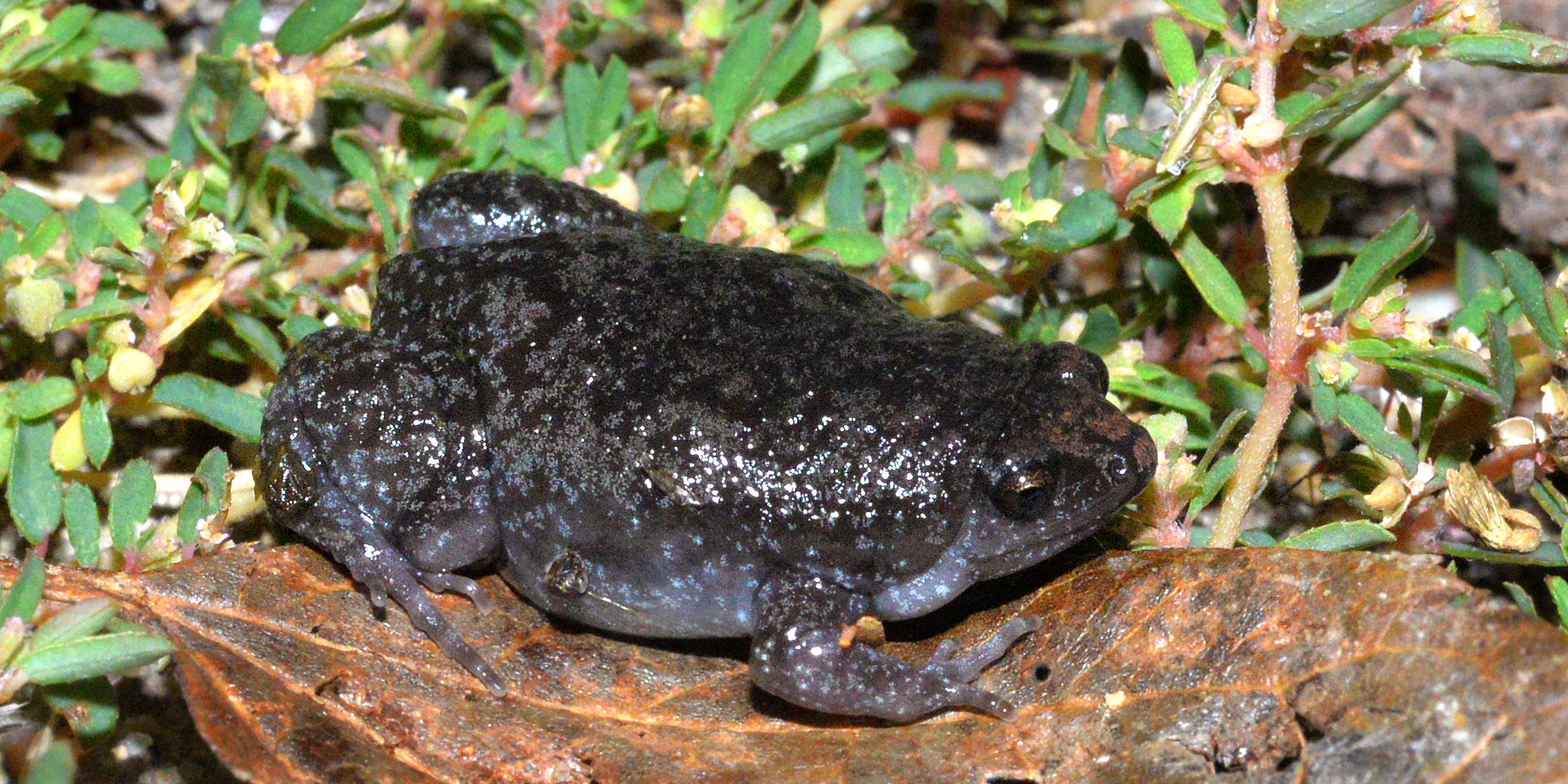
Eastern narrow-mouth toad, (Gastrophryne carolinensis) in Liberty County

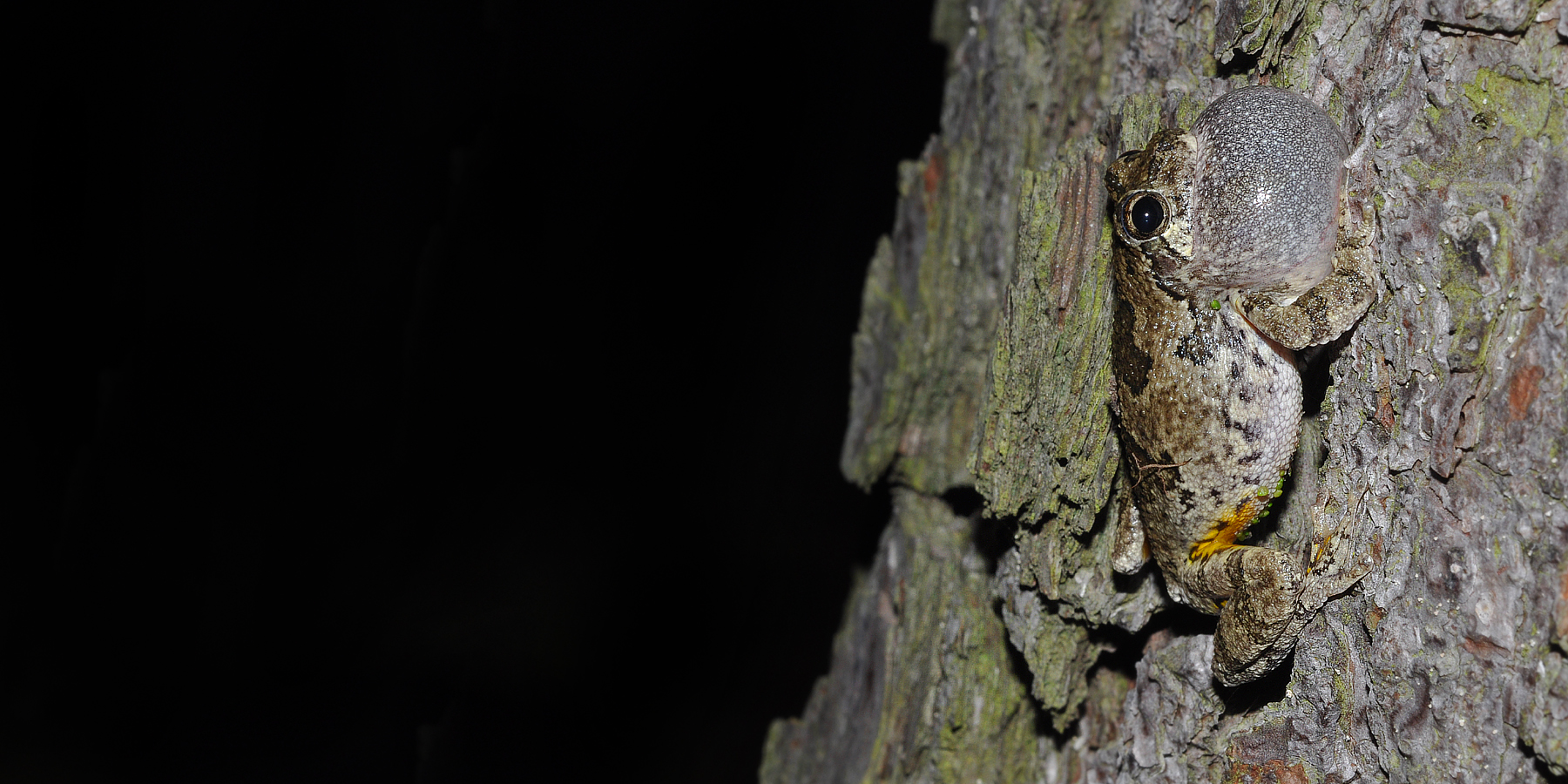
Gray treefrog (Hyla versicolor) in Montgomery County

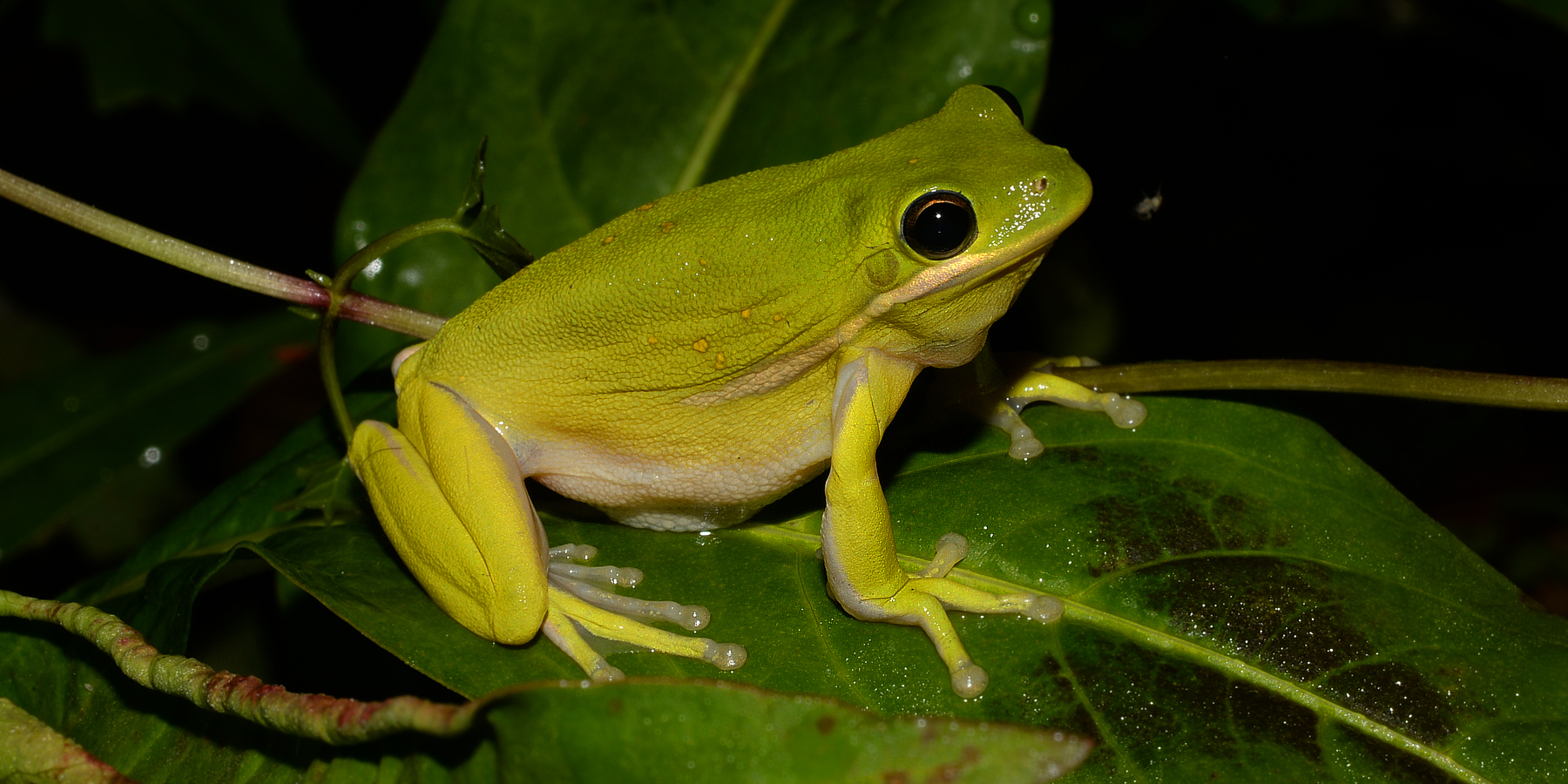
Green treefrog (Hyla cinerea) in Hardin County

Fishes: Well over 90 species of fishes are known from the area. The Big Thicket National Preserve inventoried 92 species in the preserve's waters and another 20 species are noted as possible occurrences. The National Park Service checklist includes 104 species. Others source note 98 species and 94 species. In the smaller tributaries the most abundant species are minnows, killifishes, darters, bass, and bullhead catfish, while larger creeks and bayous are dominated by channel, blue, and flathead catfish, sunfishes, largemouth and spotted bass, and crappie.

Insects: Studies have documented nearly 1,800 species of Lepidoptera (butterflies and moths) in the Big Thicket.

Dragonflies and damselflies (Odonata): Damselflies typically sit with their wings together, closed over their backs. Dragonflies sit with their wings spread. Collectively over 120 species occur in the Big Thicket area. They are often associated with water where they lay their eggs. Most species have preferences in the water they frequent, such as moving water vs. still water, streams, ponds, marshes etc. The Needham's skimmer (Libellula needhami) lay their eggs in flight, while the ebony jewelwing (Calopteryx maculata) submerges for up to two hours while depositing eggs. The nymphs are aquatic. Both the larva and adults are fierce predators, feeding primarily on insects. They are frequently sexually dimorphic and males and females may have different colors and patterns. Some species like the roseate skimmer (Orthemis ferruginea) and common green darner (Anax junius) can be seen in their adult form year round. Others are limited to a few weeks or mouths each year like the calico pennant (Celithemis elisa) flying April - August and Needham's skimmer (Libellula needhami) flying May - September. The Texas emerald (Somatochlora margarita) and the rare and sarracenia spiketail (Cordulegaster sarracenia) are endemic to southeast Texas and adjacent areas of Louisiana.

Dragonflies and damselflies (Odonata) gallery

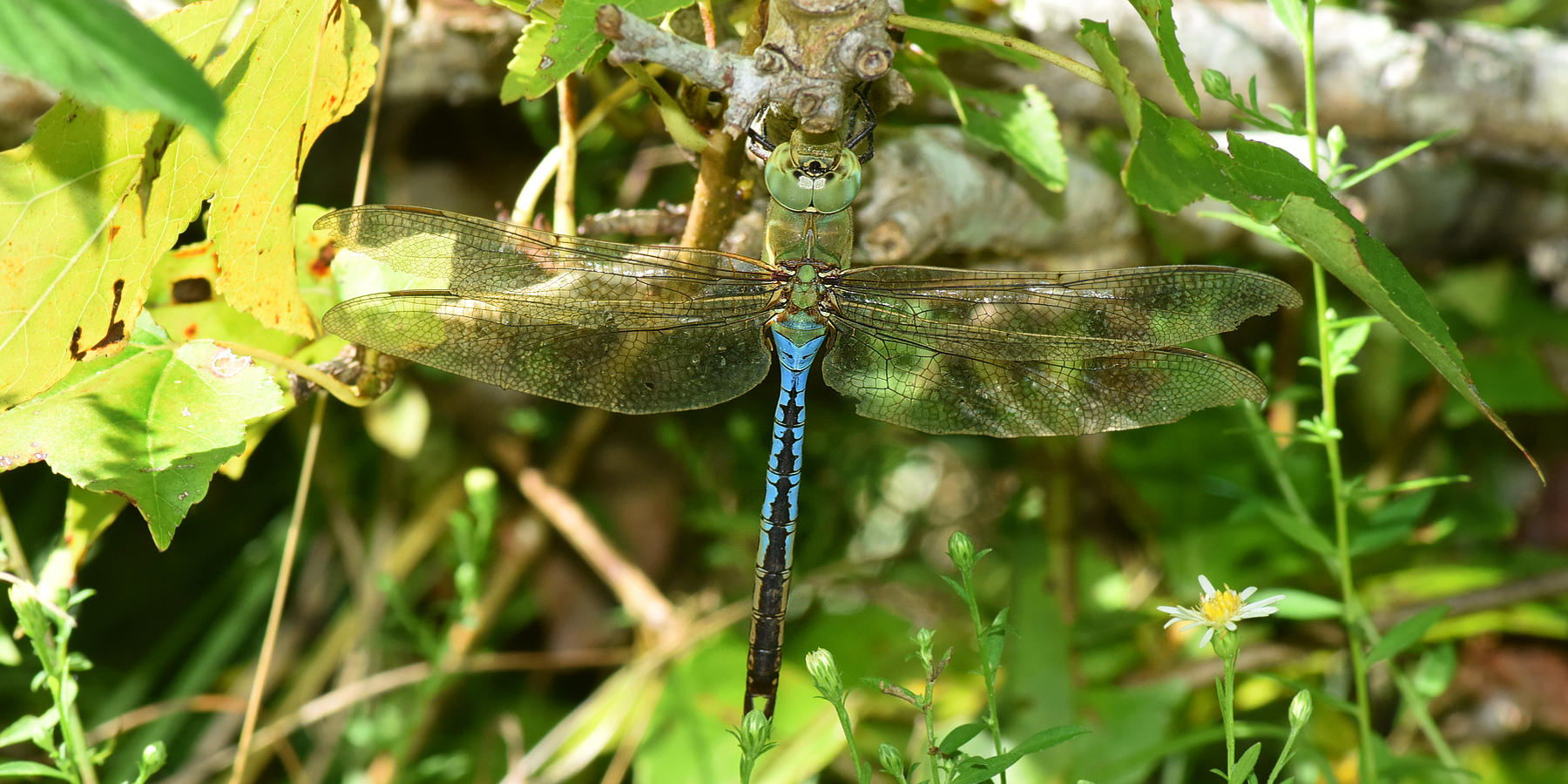
Common green darner (Anax junius), male, Liberty County

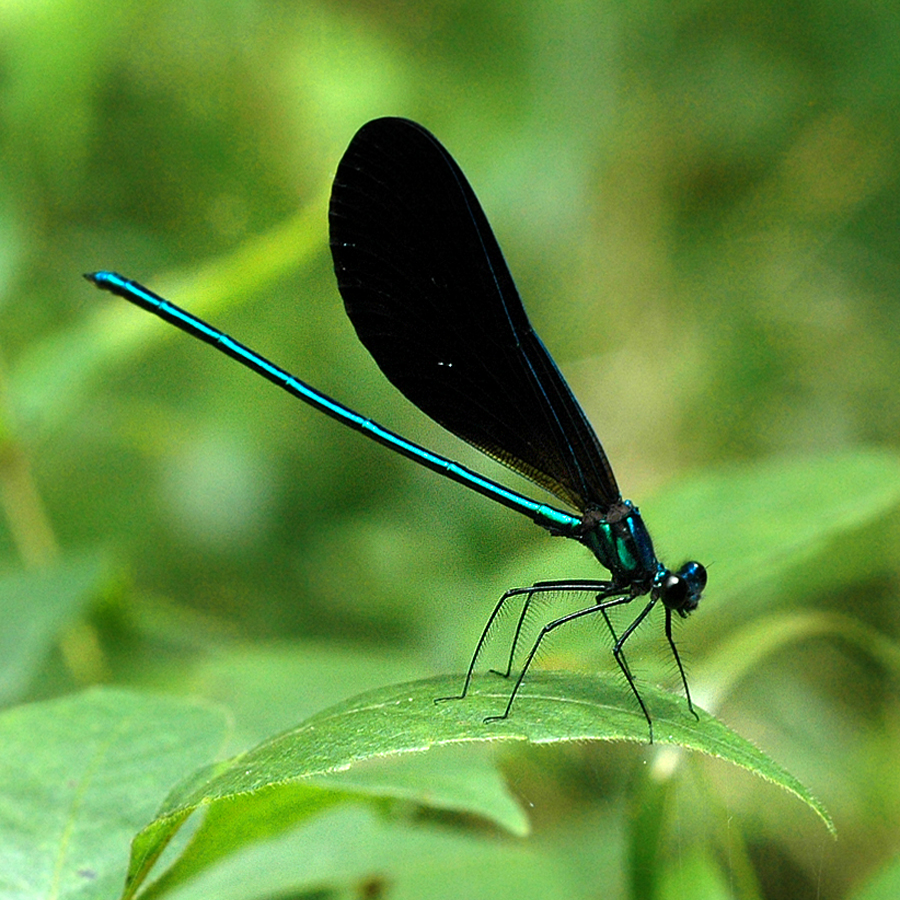
Ebony jewelwing (Calopteryx maculata), male, San Jacinto County

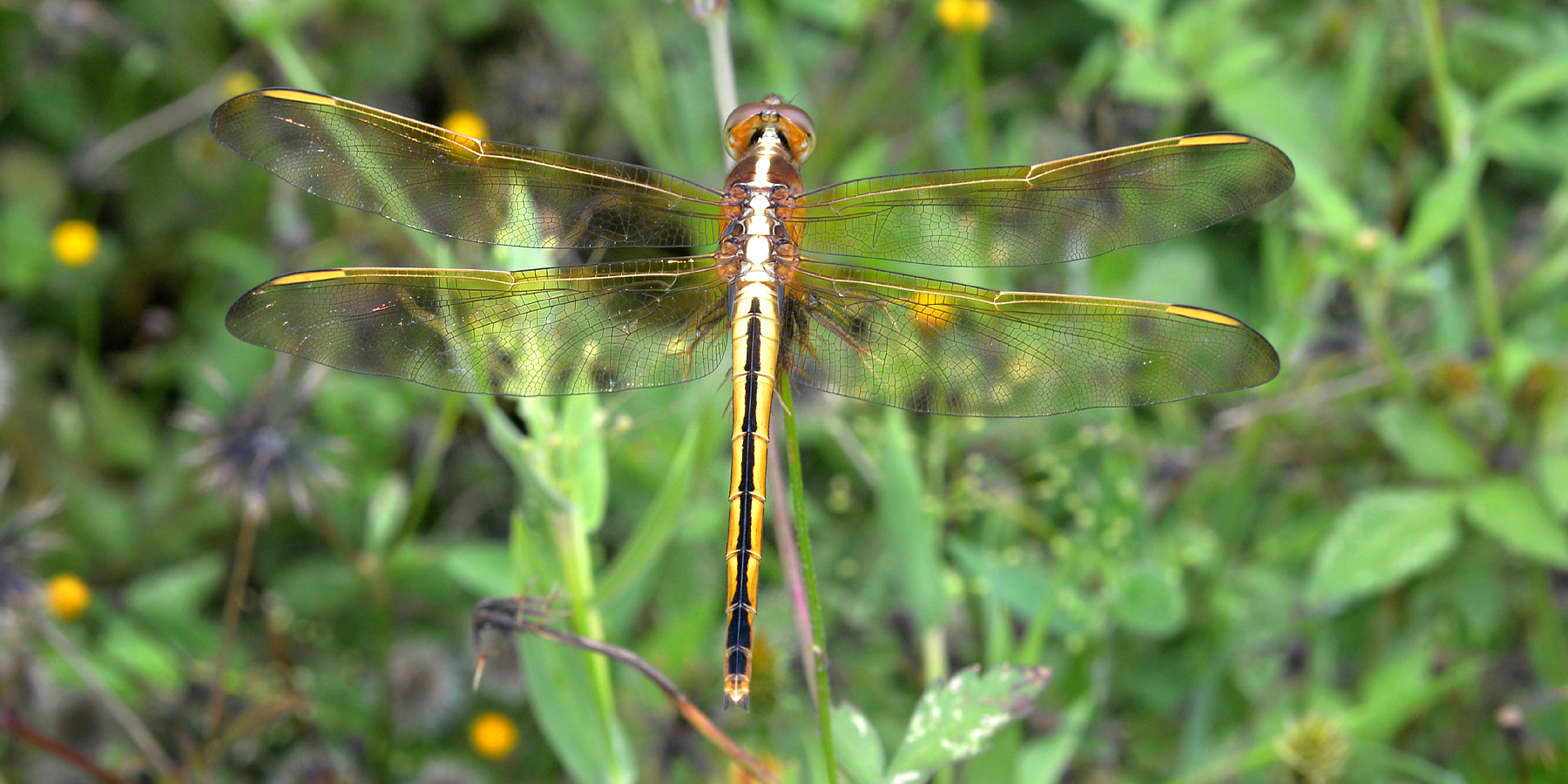
Needham's skimmer (Libellula needhami) female, Harris Co County

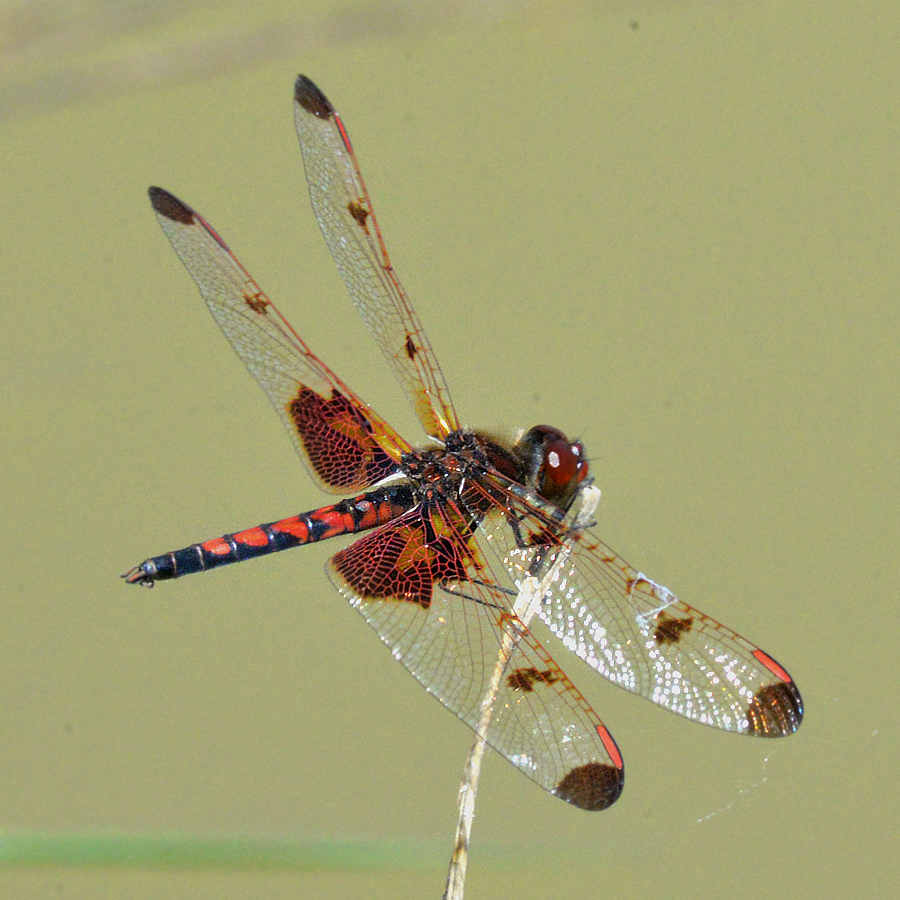
Calico pennant (Celithemis elisa) male, Chambers County

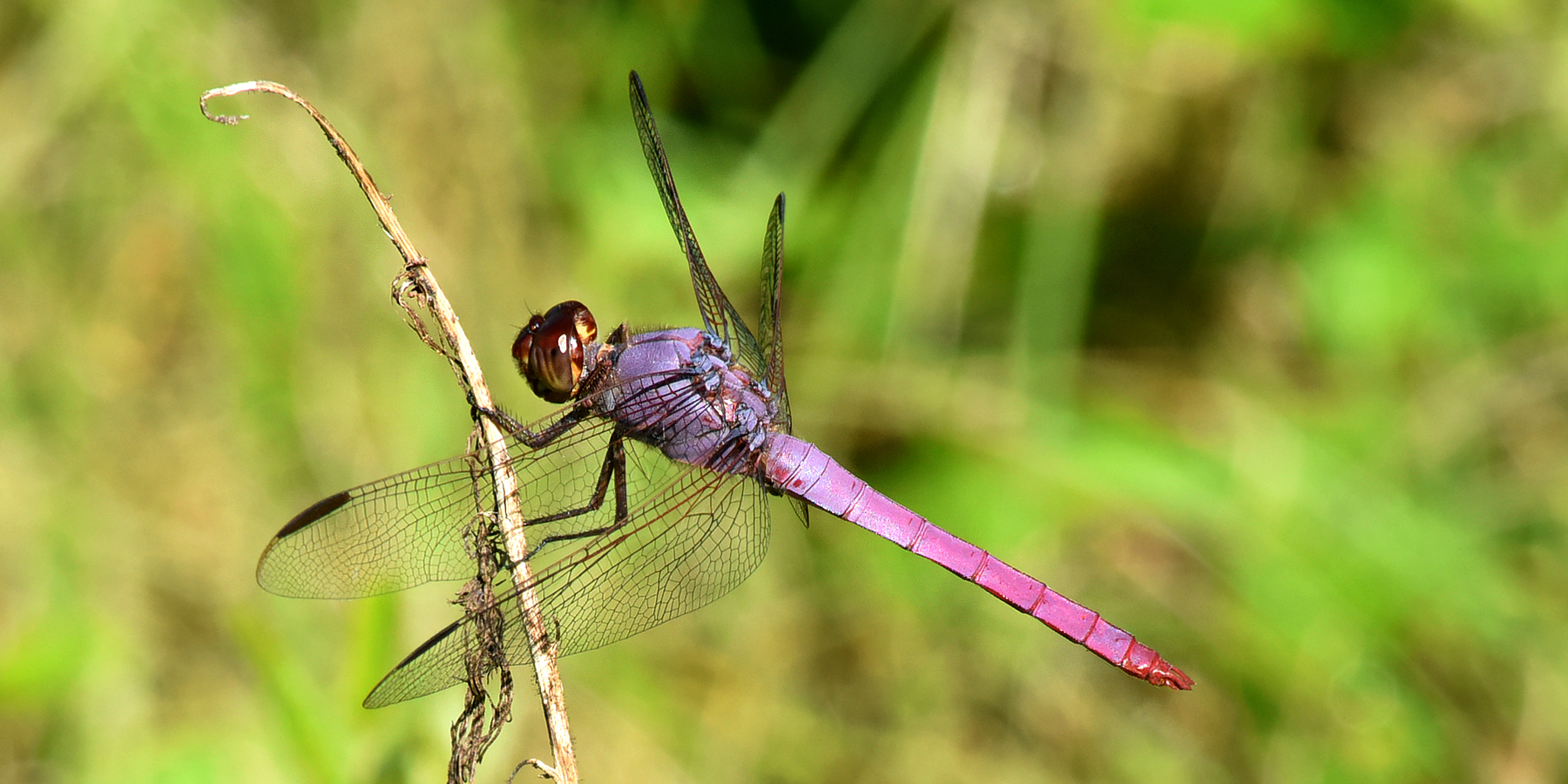
Roseate skimmer (Orthemis ferruginea), male, Liberty County

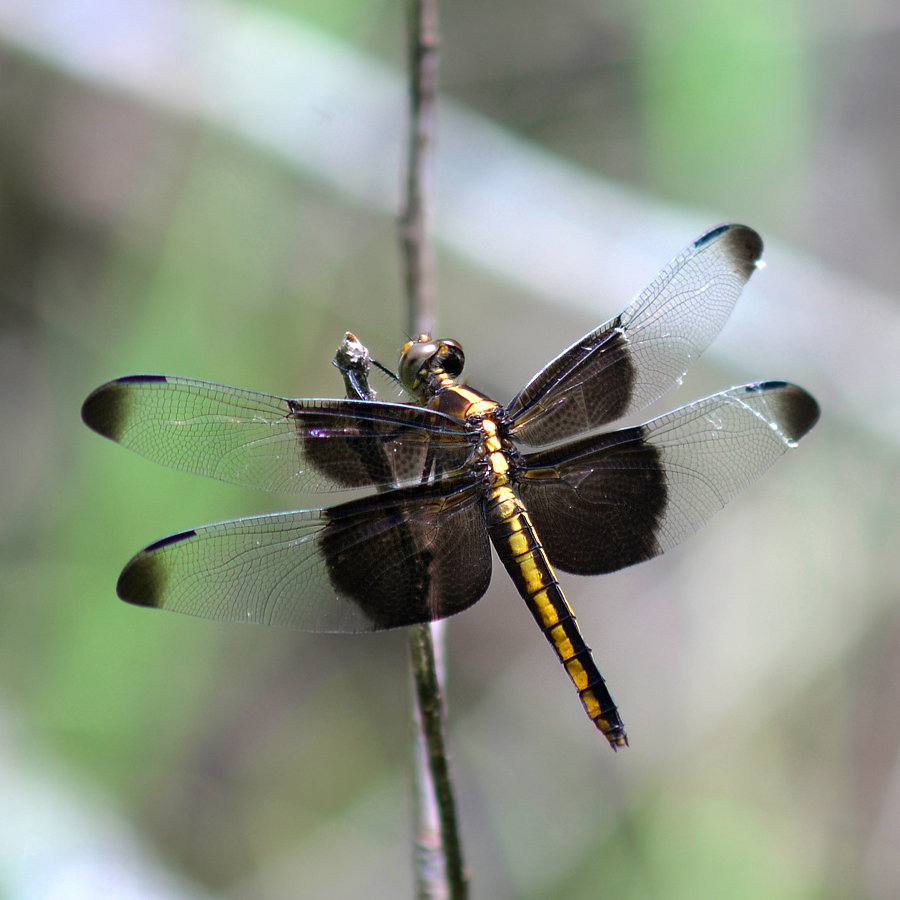
Widow skimmer (Libellula luctuosa), female, Houston County

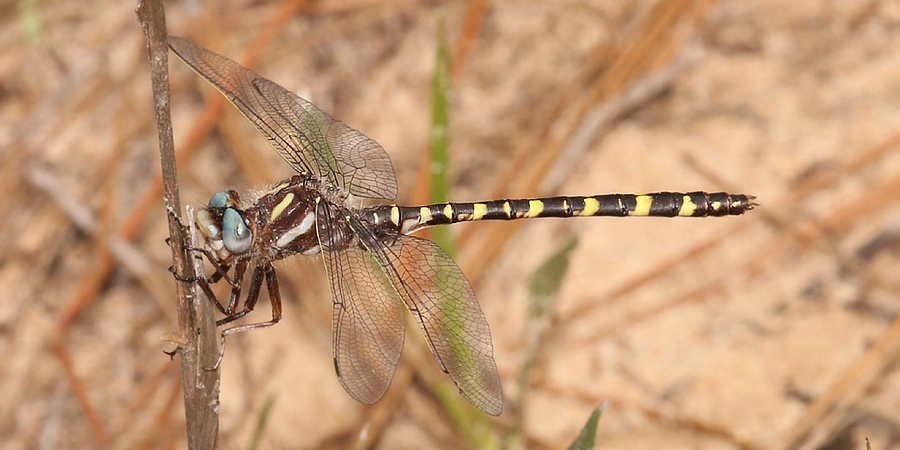
Sarracenia spiketail (Cordulegaster sarracenia) Rapides Parish, Louisiana

== History ==
In pre-Columbian times, people of the Caddoan Mississippian culture occupied areas just to the north of the Big Thicket region. The Atakapa-Ishak (including the subgroups Akiosa, Akokisas, Bidai, Deadoses, and Patiri) occupied the Big Thicket area, living nomadically along the Gulf of Mexico in Southeast Texas and southwest Louisiana. They left evidence of hunting camps and such, although the Big Thicket area itself does not appear to have been the site of any significant permanent settlements comparable to the Caddo mound builders to the north. The Atakapa-Ishak speaking people were largely decimated by European diseases in the late eighteenth century, with only a few descendants surviving today. About the same time as the collapse of the Atakapa-Ishak people, the Alabama-Coushatta, originally two closely associated tribes living in adjacent areas of Alabama, began a westward migration about 1763 due to the encroachment of Europeans. The Alabama-Coushatta settled into the northern sections of the Big Thicket area by 1780, prior to the acquisition of their reservation in 1854.

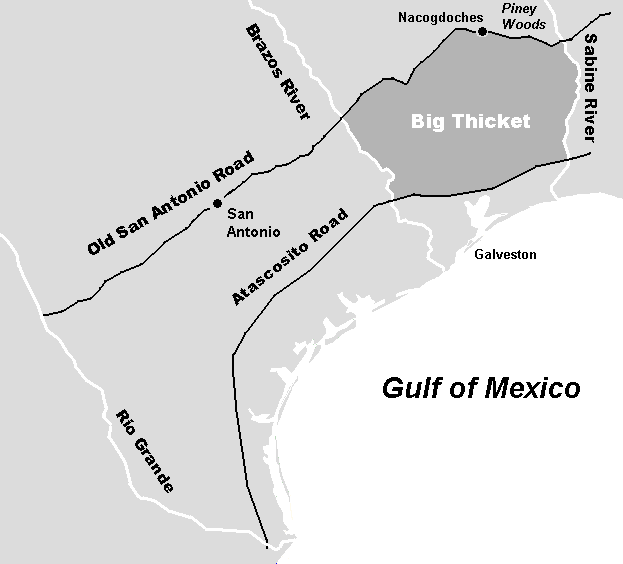
Historical limits of the Big Thicket region defined by the Spanish prior to the Texas Revolution in the 1830s. Deforestation has dramatically reduced its size.

The Spaniards ruled the region c. 1521–1810, defining the Big Thicket's boundaries with the north as El Camino Real de los Tejas (Old San Antonio Road), a trail from central Texas to Nacogdoches; in the south as the Atascosito Road running from southwest Louisiana to Southeast Texas; to the west by the Brazos River; and to the east by the Sabine River. The Spanish established a settlement called Atascosito on the Atascosito Road at the Trinity River in 1756, renamed Villa de la Santissima Trinidad de la Libertad (Village of the Most Holy Trinity of Liberty) in 1831, later shortened to Liberty. However, this was little more than an outpost on the road and a stop on the river and interior areas were not developed in colonial times. Likewise, Beaumont (Tevis Bluff) was established in 1826 and Fort Teran, a long abandoned site in Tyler County on the Neches River were both primarily stops for river traffic.

After Mexican independence (c. 1810–1836), the region remained largely undeveloped. One of the earliest European naturalists to survey Texas was Jean Louis Berlandier (1803–1851), a French naturalist who participated in a Mexican Boundary Survey from 1828 to 1829. Although Berlandier did not survey the Big Thicket area, he did travel to Robbins Crossing, where the El Camino Real (Old San Antonio Road) crossed the Trinity River and camped May 25–29, 1829, collecting information on the Trinity River among other things. Of the lower Trinity, Berlandier wrote in his journal "Every year in May or June the water overflows its banks. These banks are covered with dense forest where one finds many nut trees [pecans], oaks, maples, elms, and pines. The banks are populated by various Indian nations of the United States of America, such as the Conchates [Coushatta], Kichais, and Kicapoos, who have established their village there. One also finds two villages of colonist, known as Trinidad and Atascosito, which have achieved some growth at the present time". Lorenzo de Zavala (1788–1836) received empresario land grants in 1829 and sought to interest capitalists in New York without success. In 1830, Zavala formed the Galveston Bay and Texas Land Company in New York City with Joseph Vehlein and David G. Burnet (holding grants for 3,743,163 acres (15,148 km^{2}) in Texas) in hopes of colonizing the land, but they had minimal success. Stephen Jackson received 4,428 acres (18 km^{2}) in Hardin County, settling at Sour Lake Springs around 1835, the oldest extant town in the county. With Texas independence (1836), and the early years of statehood in the United States, Anglo-Saxon settlers began drifting into the area. Entrepreneurs bottled the water from the Sour Lake Springs and Jackson had developed a health resort with quality accommodations there by 1850. A Sour Lake post office was established in 1866 but discontinued in 1876.

In the mid-nineteenth century the Big Thicket was sparsely populated, its scattered inhabitants living in the woods off subsistence farming, hunting, and running free-range hogs and cattle. It also had a reputation as a place for those avoiding conscription in the Confederate Army, Jayhawkers, outlaws, and such.

Among the area's inhabitants, after the abolition of chattel slavery, were Black Americans. While most squatted on the land, some had enough savings to buy small parcels as soon as they could find a willing seller. These plots were sometimes the beginnings of communities, such as Fresenius in Hardin County. “Since slavery times, African Americans had specialized in nocturnal, silent, no-gun hunting methods, and they ate some small animals that whites would not eat,” such as opossums and raccoons. These were typically served with sweet potatoes or yams, which had been staple foods for Black Americans during enslavement. Foraging was also important for meeting their nutritional needs. The oral history of Josie Brown references her family foraging for grapes to use in jelly and wine during slavery. Black residents of the Big Thicket also gathered plants for home remedies and hickory nuts for food. The “fall hickory-nut gatherings, hunting, fishing, or foraging on the free range occasionally rose to the level of community social event, but families normally did these things to collect resources for home consumption.”

The 1860 census showed there were about 200 sawmills statewide, but most were located near the Gulf Coast or north of the Big Thicket. Compared to other states, lumber production in Texas was small. As late as 1870, the majority of the forest of East Texas remained untouched. However that soon changed as the "bonanza era" (c. 1880–1930) of Texas lumbering began, facilitated by a rapidly developed railroad system. In 1877 Henry J. Lutcher and G. Bedell Moore started the first major mill in Orange, Texas. Others followed, many building company towns in remote areas, where employees were often at the mercy of their employers. In the midst of the lumbering activity, oil was discovered at Spindletop in January 1901, just south of the Big Thicket. The frenzy of activity that followed saw rampant drilling and exploration, the founding of Gulf Oil, Humble, and Texaco, and a rapid growth in population, development, and infrastructure. The population of Hardin County went from 1,870 in 1880 to 15,983 in 1920 according to the Census Bureau. John Henry Kirby "Prince of the Pines", started the Kirby Lumber Company about 1900 which ultimately held mineral and timber rights to a million acres in the region. By the 1920s East Texas timber was nearing depletion and most of the operations practiced a cut-out and get-out policy and moved on, many to the Pacific coast, leaving vast areas of clear-cut forest behind. The Great Depression marked the end of the bonanza era for lumbering in East Texas. The population of Hardin County dropped to 13.936 (12.8%) in the 1930 census. Many of the towns in the Big Thicket emerged during this time in support of the lumber industry, as evidenced by names like those of Lumberton (established in the 1890s), Kirbyville (1895, named after John Kirby), Silsbee (1894, named for Nathan D. Silsbee, an East Coast investor in the railroads). Others include Kountze (1882), Camden (1889), and Diboll (1894).

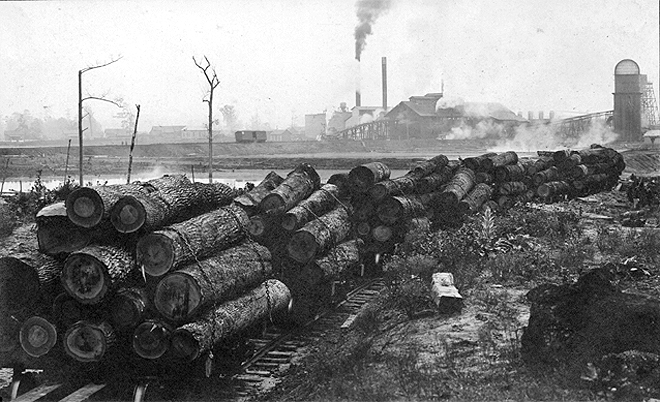
The Southern Pine Lumber Company sawmills near Diboll, Texas in 1907

William Goodrich Jones (1860–1950), "the father of Texas forestry" was a bank president and civic leader in Temple, Texas. He had some exposure to good forestry practices in Germany and understood the commercial benefits of well-managed forests and he was appalled with what he saw in East Texas. He was not a conservationist, he advocated for sustainable forestry methods as a good business practice, including reforestation, maintaining soils, grasses, wildlife, and establishing parks. In 1898 the United States Bureau of Forestry asked Jones to write a report on the status of forestry in Texas. Jones condemn the destructive and wastefulness of the logging industry and predicted the forest would be gone in 25 years without changes. He recommended state and federal regulations with sustainable harvest and reforestation programs. In 1914 Jones formed the Texas Forestry Association with public officials, lumbermen, and conservationists. In collaboration with the United States Forest Service, the Texas Forestry Association drafted legislation to establish the Texas Department of Forestry, which, in 1926, became the Texas Forest Service.

What came to be a 50-year struggle to protect a portion of the Big Thicket for posterity begin in 1927 when R. E. Jackson, a railroad conductor, formed the East Texas Big Thicket Association (ETBTA) which sought to preserve 435,000 acres (1,760 km^{2}). With Don Baird, of the Texas Academy of Science, the ETBTA instigated a biological survey that was conducted by Hal B. Parks and Victor L. Cory in 1936 defining the Big Thicket as a 3,350,000-acre (13,600 km^{2}) area of East Texas. With this survey and growing support of newspapers and the scientific community, the ETBTA lobbied the government for a national park. However, four national forests had recently been established in East Texas, more oil was discovered in Polk County, there was resistance from the lumber industry, and World War II brought an increased demand for lumber, all undermining their efforts. By the 1950s, the ETBTA existed primarily on paper and eventually expired. However the idea did not die. A new Big Thicket Association was founded in 1964 by Lance Rosier and continued pushing for protected land and the governor appointed Dempsie Henley to head a proposal for a state park. However, with changing officials in state elections, lackadaisical attitudes, opposition from timber firms, and several attempts without success, Henley enlisted the aid of U.S. Senator Ralph Yarborough in 1965. Yarborough was enthusiastic and introduced a bill to establish a 75,000-acre (300 km^{2}) national park in 1966. Claude McLeod, a biologist at Sam Houston State College, had been studying the Big Thicket for several years and completed a manuscript about the time a National Park survey team arrived in 1966 to develop the proposal. McLeod's research, which mapped over 1,500,000 acres (6,100 km^{2}) acres across nine counties, was used as the basis for the National Park's report. It was only after seven years and another 27 Big Thicket bills were introduced in Congress, both pro and con, that a resolution was reached. Congress passed the Big Thicket National Preserve legislation in 1974 which was finally signed by President Gerald Ford.

== Protected and public land ==
Don't plan to hike the Big Thicket. A hiker expects to cover distance. Plan to stroll the Thicket - or saunter, to use Thoreau's word, pausing often to let your eyes squint and your ears pick up rustling and callings.

— Howard Peacock

The headquarters of Big Thicket National Preserve (BTNP) are located 8 miles (13 km) north of Kountze, Texas, and approximately 30 miles (48 km) north of Beaumont via US 69/287. It is administered by the National Park Service, U.S. Department of the Interior. It consists of nine separate land units as well as six water corridors and as of October 22, 2019, the preserve includes 113,122 acres (457.79 km^{2}) spread over seven counties. Centered about Hardin County, Texas, the BTNP extends into parts of surrounding Jasper, Jefferson, Liberty, Orange, Polk, and Tyler counties. It was established in 1974 in an attempt to protect the many plant and animal species within. Along with Big Cypress National Preserve in Florida, the BTNP became the first national preserve in the United States National Park System when both were authorized by the United States Congress on October 11, 1974. Senator Ralph Yarborough was its most powerful proponent in Congress and the bill was proposed by Charles Wilson and Bob Eckhardt that established the 84,550-acre (342.2 km^{2}) preserve. The BTNP was also designated as a biosphere reserve by UNESCO in 1981. National preserves differ from national parks in that some public hunting, trapping, oil/gas exploration and extraction are permitted.

- Huntsville State Park, Texas Parks and Wildlife (2,083 acres (8.43 km^{2}))
- Lake Houston Wilderness Park, Houston Parks and Recreation Department (4,786 acres (19.37 km^{2}))
- Martin Dies Jr. State Park, Texas Parks and Wildlife (705 acres (2.85 km^{2}))
- Roy E. Larsen Sandyland Sanctuary, The Nature Conservancy (5,654 acres (22.88 km^{2}))
- Sam Houston National Forest, U.S Department of Agriculture, Forest Service, Big Creek Scenic Area (1,420 acres (5.7 km^{2})), Little Lake Creek Wilderness (3,855 acres (15.60 km^{2}))
- Trinity River National Wildlife Refuge, U.S. Fish and Wildlife Service (30,000 acres (120 km^{2}))
- Village Creek State Park, Texas Parks and Wildlife (1,090 acres (4.4 km^{2}))

== Ghost Road ==
A dirt road leading north out of the town of Saratoga is the core of the area's predominant ghost story. Bragg Road, as it is more formally known, was constructed in 1934 on the bed of a former railroad line that had serviced the lumber industry. In the 1940s, stories began to circulate about a mysterious light, sometimes referred to as the Light of Saratoga, that could be seen on and near the road at night. No adequate explanation of the light has been offered. The various ghost stories include reference to the Kaiser Burnout, long-dead conquistadors looking for their buried treasure, a decapitated railroad worker, and a lost night hunter eternally searching for a way out. Less paranormal explanations include swamp gas, and automobile headlights filtering through the trees.

== Notable people ==
- John Alexander (born 1945, Beaumont, Jefferson County), American painter that often draws inspiration and paints the landscape of Southeast Texas
- Brian Philip Babin (born 1948, resident of Woodville, Tyler County) U.S. representative from Texas's 36th congressional district since January 2015
- Annette Gordon-Reed (born 1958, Livingston, Polk County) historian and Pulitzer Prize winning author
- George Glenn Jones (1931, Saratoga, Hardin County – 2013) country musician and songwriter
- Margo Jones (1913, Livingston, Polk County – 1955) stage and theater director nicknamed "The Texas Tornado"
- Aubrey Wilson Mullican (1909, Polk County – 1967) known as "Moon Mullican, King of the Hillbilly Piano Players", country-western musician and songwriter

== Bibliography ==
- Abernethy, Frances Edward (2014) Let The River Run Wild! Saving The Neches. Stephen F. Austin University Press, Nacogdoches. ?? pp. ISBN 9781622880287
- Ajilvsgi, Geyata (1979) Wild Flowers of the Big Thicket: East Texas, and Western Louisiana. Texas A&M University Press. College Station, Texas 361 pp. ISBN 0-89096-064-X
- Bowman, Bob (1990). The 35 Best Ghost Towns in East Texas and 220 Other Towns We Left Behind. Best of East Texas Publishers, Lufkin ?? pp. ISBN 978-1878096128
- Brock, Ronald G. (2022) The Thicket's Prodigy.Galt/Mirrin Publishing, LLC, Scottsdale. 390 pp. ISBN 9798986514406
- Donovan, Richard M. (2006). Paddling the Wild Neches. Texas A&M University Press, College Station. 237 pp. ISBN 978-1585444960
- Douglas, William O. (1967) Farewell to Texas: a Vanishing Wilderness. McGraw-Hill, New York. 242 pp.
- Fritz, Edward C. (1993) Realms of Beauty: A Guide to the Wilderness Areas of East Texas, revised edition. University of Texas Press, Austin. 120 pp. ISBN 0-292-72479-9
- Gunter, Pete A. Y. (1971) The Big Thicket: A Challenge for Conservation. Jenkins 172 pp. ISBN 978-0856990441
- Gunter, Pete A. Y. (1993) The Big Thicket: An Ecological Reevaluation (Philosophy and Environment, Vol. 2). University of North Texas Press, Denton. 229 pp. ISBN 0929398521, ISBN 9780929398525
- Gunter, Pete A. Y. (2015) Finding the Big Thicket: A Cartographic Approach. CreateSpace Independent Publishing Platform. 74 pp. ISBN 151682749X ISBN 978-1516827497
- Henley, Dempsie (1970) The Murder of Silence: The Big Thicket Story. Texian Press, Waco. 274 pp.
- Landrey, Wanda A. (1976) Outlaws in the Big Thicket. Eakin Press, Woodway. 142 pp. ISBN 1571684921, ISBN 978-1571684929
- Landrey, Wanda A. (1990) Boardin' in the Thicket. University of North Texas Press, Denton. 216 pp. ISBN 978-0929398075
- MacRoberts, M.H., MacRoberts, B.R. and Rudolph, D.C. (2010). "Vertebrate Richness and Biogeography in the Big Thicket of Texas." The American Midland Naturalist, 164(1), pp. 37–43.
- Maxwell, Robert S. & Robert D. Baker (2000) Sawdust Empire: The Texas Lumber Industry, 1830–1940. Texas A&M University Press, College Station. 256 pp. ISBN 978-1585440597
- McLeod, Claude A. (1972) The Big Thicket of Eastern Texas. Sam Houston State University Press, Huntsville. 33 pp.
- National Park Service (2013) A Summary of Biological Inventory Data Collected at Big Thicket National Preserve: Vertebrate and Vascular Plant Inventories. CreateSpace Independent Publishing Platform. 76 pages ISBN 1492785466 ISBN 978-1492785460
- Parker, Lois Williams (1977) The Big Thicket of Texas: A Comprehensive Annotated Bibliography. Sable Publishing Corp., Arlington. 225 pp. ISBN 978-0914832041
- Peacock, Howard (1984) The Big Thicket of Texas: America's Ecological Wonder. Little, Brown and Co. Boston. 89 pp. ISBN 0316695831
- Peacock, Howard (1994) Nature Lover's Guide to the Big Thicket. Texas A&M. University Press. College Station, Texas. 169 pp. ISBN 0-89096-589-7
- Pittman, Blair & William A. Owens (1978) The Natural World of the Texas Big Thicket (Louise Lindsey Merrick Texas Environment Series #2). Texas A&M University Press, College Station. 100 pp. ISBN 978-0890960615
- Riggs, Rob (2001) In the Big Thicket on the Trail of the Wild Man: Exploring Nature's Mysterious Dimension. Paraview Press, Old Chelsea Station, New York. 188 pp. ISBN 1944529519
- Shafer, Harry J., Edward P. Baxter, Thomas B. Stearns, and James Phil Dering (1975) Archeological Assessment Big Thicket National Preserve. Texas A&M University Press, College Station.
- Sitton, Thad (2008) Backwoodsmen: Stockmen and Hunters along a Big Thicket River Valley. University of Oklahoma Press, Norman. 328 pp. ISBN 978-0806139647
- Sitton, Thad & James H. Conrad (1998). Nameless Towns: Texas Sawmill Communities 1880–1942. University of Texas Press, Austin. 271 pp. ISBN 978-0292777262
- Sitton, Thad & C. E. Hunt (2008) Big Thicket People: Larry Jene Fisher's Photographs of the Last Southern Frontier, revised ed. (Bridwell Texas History Series). University of Texas Press, Austin. 156 pp. ISBN 0292717822, ISBN 978-0292717824
- Todd, David & David Weisman, editors. (2010). The Texas Legacy Project: Stories of Courage and Conservation. Texas A&M University Press, College Station. 296 pp. ISBN 978-1603442008
- Truett, Joe C. & Daniel W. Lay (1994). Land of Bears and Honey: A Natural History of East Texas. University of Texas Press, Austin. 198 pp. ISBN 978-0292781344
- Wells, Renee Hart (2018) Big Thicket Region. Arcadia Publishing Library Editions. 130 pp. ISBN 1540235890, ISBN 978-1540235893

University of North Texas Press, Temple Big Thicket Series

The University of North Texas Press, Denton, co-published with The Big Thicket Association and the assistance of T.L.L. Temple Foundation, a series of books on the Big Thicket (Maxine Johnston, series editor). The series included both new works and reprints of outstanding books of continuing interest, with subjects ranging from folklore, to cultural history, to biology and botany.

- Francis Edward Abernethy, editor (2002) Tales from the Big Thicket (Temple Big Thicket Series #1). University of North Texas Press. 256 pp. ISBN 9781574411423, ISBN 157441142X
- Loughmiller, Campbell & Lynn Loughmiller, editors (2002) Big Thicket Legacy (Temple Big Thicket Series #2) University of North Texas Press, Denton, TX. 256 pp. ISBN 157441156X, ISBN 9781574411560
- Watson, Geraldine Ellis (2013) Reflections on the Neches: A Naturalist's Odyssey along the Big Thicket's Snow River (Temple Big Thicket Series #3). University of North Texas Press, Denton. 376 pp. ISBN 9781574411607, ISBN 1574411608, Paperback ISBN 9781574415353
- Cozine, Jr., James J. (2004). Saving the Big Thicket From Exploration to Preservation, 1685–2003 (Temple Big Thicket Series #4).University of North Texas Press. Denton. 272 pp. 4. ISBN 1-57441-175-6, ISBN 9781574411751
- Watson, Geraldine Ellis (2006) Big Thicket Plant Ecology: An Introduction, Third Edition (Temple Big Thicket Series #5). University of North Texas Press. 152 pp. ISBN 1574412140 ISBN 978-1574412147
- Bonney, Lorraine G. (2011) The Big Thicket Guidebook: Exploring the Backroads and History of Southeast Texas (Temple Big Thicket Series #6). University of North Texas Press, Denton. 848 pp. ISBN 157441318X

== See also ==
- History of Texas forests
