= Area code 409 =

Area code in southeast Texas, United States

Numbering plan areas and area codes of Texas with numbering plan area 409 highlighted.

Area code 409 is a telephone area code in the North American Numbering Plan (NANP) for the U.S. state of Texas. The numbering plan area comprises the Beaumont and Galveston areas. It was created on March 19, 1983, in an area code split of area code 713, the first since 619 split from 714 four months earlier. Initially, it consisted of a horseshoe-shaped area that almost completely surrounded Houston, but in 2000 it was divided into three sections. Area code 409 was retained by the eastern segment, while the central portion, centered on Nacogdoches, received area code 936 and the western portion centered on Bryan–College Station, was assigned area code 979.

== Service area ==
The counties served by area code 409 are Chambers, Galveston, Hardin, Jasper, Jefferson, Newton, Orange, Polk, Sabine, Trinity, and Tyler.

This includes the following cities and towns: Anahuac, Beaumont, Bevil Oaks, Bon Wier, Bridge City, Bronson, Brookeland, Buna, Burkeville, Call, China, Colmesneil, Deweyville, Doucette, Evadale, Fannett, Fred, Galveston, Gilchrist, Groves, Hamshire, Hankamer, Hemphill, High Island, Hillister, Hitchcock, Honey Island, Jamaica Beach, Jasper, Kirbyville, Kountze, La Marque, LaBelle, Lumberton, Mauriceville, Milam, Nederland, Newton, Nome, Orange, Orangefield, Pine Forest, Pinehurst, Pineland, Pinewood Estates, Port Arthur, Port Bolivar, Port Neches, Rose City, Rose Hill Acres, Sabine Pass, Santa Fe, Silsbee, Sour Lake, Spurger, Stowell, Taylor Landing, Texas City, Tiki Island, Vidor, Village Mills, Wallisville, Warren, West Orange, Wiergate, Wildwood, Winnie, and Woodville.

== Ten-digit dialing ==
Prior to October 2021, area code 409 had telephone numbers assigned for the central office code 988. In 2020, 988 was designated nationwide as a dialing code for the National Suicide Prevention Lifeline, which created a conflict for exchanges that permit seven-digit dialing. This area code was therefore scheduled to transition to ten-digit dialing by October 24, 2021.

== See also ==
- List of Texas area codes

Texas area codes: 210/726, 214/469/972/945, 254, 325, 361, 409, 432, 512/737, 713/281/832/346, 806, 817/682, 830, 903/430, 915, 936, 940, 956, 979
	North: 936	
West: 281/346/621/713/832, 936, 979	Area code 409	East: 318, 337
	South: Gulf of Mexico	
Louisiana area codes: 225, 318/457, 337, 504, 985
