= China, Texas =

- City
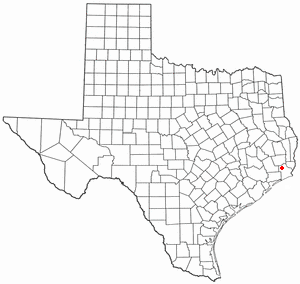

- Coordinates: 30°03′08″N 94°20′16″W
- Country: United States
- State: Texas
- County: Jefferson

Area
  - Total: 1.29 sq mi (3.34 km^{2})
  - Land: 1.28 sq mi (3.32 km^{2})
  - Water: 0.0077 sq mi (0.02 km^{2})
- Elevation: 43 ft (13 m)

Population (2020)
  - Total: 1,260
  - Density: 941/sq mi (363.4/km^{2})
- Time zone: UTC-6 (Central (CST))
  - Summer (DST): UTC-5 (CDT)
- ZIP code: 77613
- Area code: 409
- FIPS code: 48-14704
- GNIS feature ID: 2409452
- Website: City of China, Texas

China is a city in Jefferson County, Texas, United States. The population was 1,260 at the 2020 census. It is part of the Beaumont–Port Arthur Metropolitan Statistical Area.

== History ==
China was first known as "China Grove", for a water stop for the Texas and New Orleans Railroad that sat amidst a grove of chinaberry trees. In the 1860s a small community grew around the water stop, and another a few miles away named Nashland. A post office with the name "China" was established there in 1893. When fire destroyed the China Grove depot in 1906, the railroad rebuilt in the larger Nashland area, but retained the established name "China" as the name of the depot. The Nashland post office changed its name to China shortly afterward. It was only in 1971 that the (now-merged) community voted to incorporate as the city of China, Texas.

During World War II, a small branch camp was built for German prisoners of war who were detailed to China from the larger Camp Huntsville in Walker County (now a part of Sam Houston State University). These prisoners helped to maintain rice paddies while local farmers were serving in the military.

The chinaberry trees that gave the community its name are rare in the area today. In fact, two trees that were transplanted to the front lawn of the city's civic complex in the mid 1990s are some of the only remaining examples. However, several local China and Meeker natives have taken to cultivating and nurturing new and transplanted chinaberry trees.

In 1999, Walt Disney Home Video celebrated the video release of Mulan in China. They built a miniature version of the Great Wall of China on what used to be Henderson Middle School (now China Elementary School) football field.

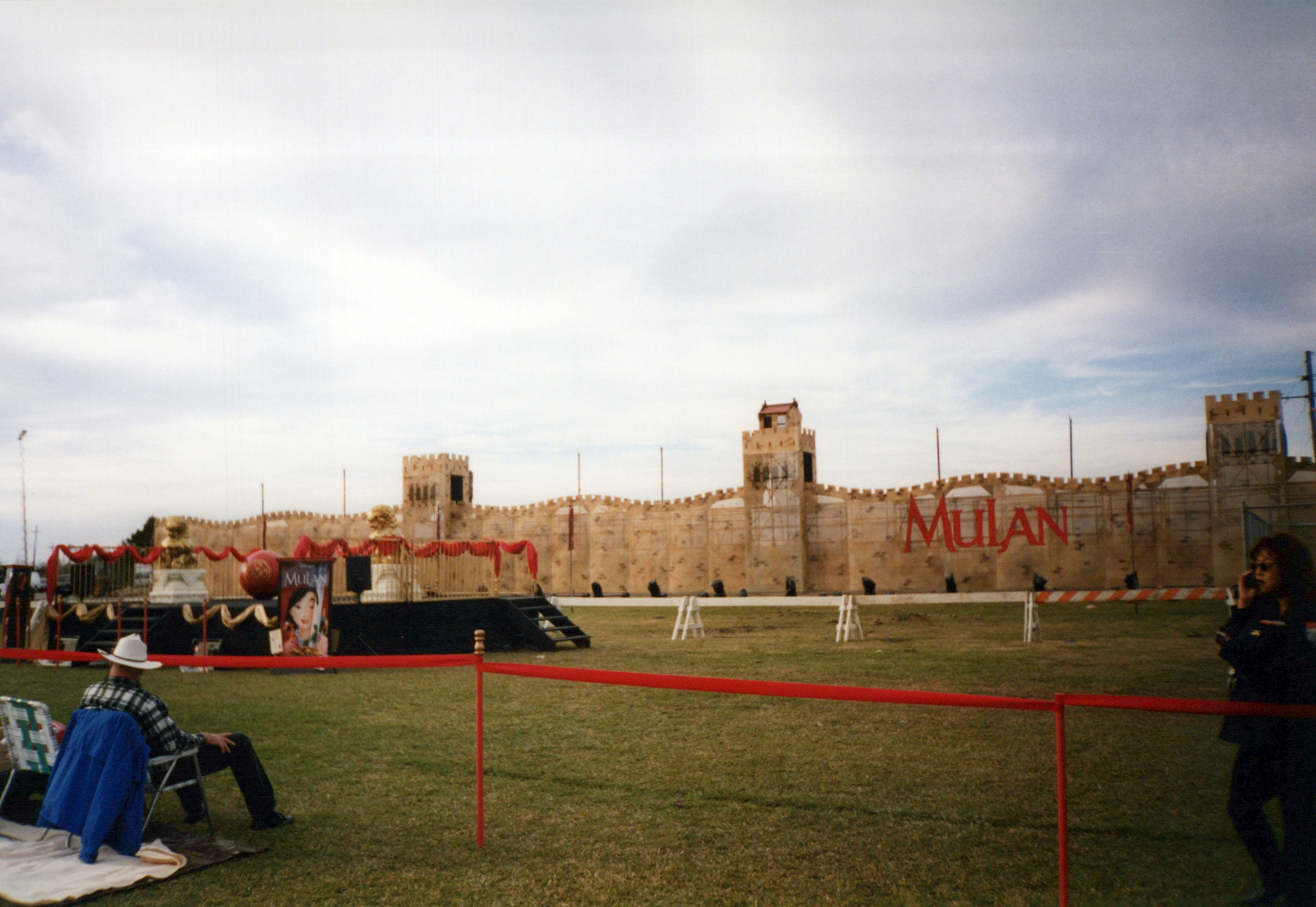
"Great Wall" on the football field at the former Henderson Middle School.

For years, China Elementary hosted an annual Chinaberry Festival, to celebrate the city's people and history. The festival featured a parade, local country musicians, and many booths fielded by local vendors and church groups. However the elementary school has not hosted the festival since the destruction of Hurricane Rita in 2005. Instead the City of China has attempted somewhat unsuccessfully to reinstate the festival.

In 2004, former Mayor Hermann Edwards pleaded guilty to tampering with governmental records and was sentenced to a year of probation.

== Geography ==
According to the United States Census Bureau, the city has a total area of 1.3 square miles (3.4 km^{2}), of which 1.3 square miles (3.4 km^{2}) is land and 0.77% is water.

== Demographics ==
Historical population
Census	Pop.	Note	%±
1980	1,351		—
1990	1,144		−15.3%
2000	1,112		−2.8%
2010	1,160		4.3%
2020	1,260		8.6%
U.S. Decennial Census

=== 2020 census ===
As of the 2020 census, China had a population of 1,260, a median age of 43.2 years, 23.7% of residents under the age of 18, and 21.2% of residents 65 years of age or older. For every 100 females there were 94.1 males, and for every 100 females age 18 and over there were 86.4 males age 18 and over.

0% of residents lived in urban areas, while 100.0% lived in rural areas.

As of the 2020 census, there were 519 households in China, of which 32.6% had children under the age of 18 living in them. Of all households, 47.2% were married-couple households, 17.3% were households with a male householder and no spouse or partner present, and 31.8% were households with a female householder and no spouse or partner present. About 21.9% of all households were made up of individuals and 9.6% had someone living alone who was 65 years of age or older.

The 2020 census recorded 569 housing units, of which 8.8% were vacant. Among occupied housing units, 71.3% were owner-occupied and 28.7% were renter-occupied. The homeowner vacancy rate was 0.8% and the rental vacancy rate was 4.4%.

Racial composition as of the 2020 census
Race	Percent
White	61.3%
Black or African American	28.1%
American Indian and Alaska Native	0.3%
Asian	1.1%
Native Hawaiian and Other Pacific Islander	0%
Some other race	2.8%
Two or more races	6.3%
Hispanic or Latino (of any race)	8.0%

=== 2000 census ===
As of the census of 2000, there were 1,112 people, 426 households, and 314 families residing in the city. The population density was 862.8 inhabitants per square mile (333.1/km^{2}). There were 458 housing units at an average density of 355.4 per square mile (137.2/km^{2}). The racial makeup of the city was 71.04% White, 24.01% African American, 0.36% Native American, 0.90% Asian, 2.79% from other races, and 0.90% from two or more races. Hispanic or Latino of any race were 4.59% of the population.

There were 426 households, out of which 31.0% had children under the age of 18 living with them, 55.9% were married couples living together, 12.7% had a female householder with no husband present, and 26.1% were non-families. 23.5% of all households were made up of individuals, and 11.0% had someone living alone who was 65 years of age or older. The average household size was 2.61 and the average family size was 3.08.

In the city, the population was 25.4% under the age of 18, 7.4% from 18 to 24, 28.6% from 25 to 44, 24.5% from 45 to 64, and 14.2% who were 65 years of age or older. The median age was 39 years. For every 100 females, there were 95.1 males. For every 100 females age 18 and over, there were 86.9 males. The median income for a household in the city was $36,172, and the median income for a family was $41,500. Males had a median income of $36,094 versus $21,635 for females. The per capita income for the city was $15,940. About 12.7% of families and 14.5% of the population were below the poverty line, including 19.8% of those under age 18 and 17.7% of those age 65 or over.

== School system ==
China is part of the Hardin-Jefferson Independent School District, a school system which spans a large area including China and neighboring cities Nome and Sour Lake, as well as the communities of Meeker, Pinewood, Countrywood, and Greyburg.

Until the 2009–2010 school year began, China was home to two of the district's schools, China Elementary (located in the city center across from China's city park) and Henderson Middle School (located on the outskirts of town across Highway 90). However, with the opening of the district's new high school in neighboring Sour Lake, the old high school campus was repurposed into the new Henderson Middle School, and the old middle school campus was renovated and made the new China Elementary. Portions of the old elementary school were utilized as the city hall for a few years until spring of 2020. the building is still owned by the school district but is not used

China Elementary caters to families from China and Nome. Students attend China Elementary from kindergarten until the fifth grade (and some attend the school's pre-kindergarten services).From there, all students move down Highway 326 to Henderson Middle School between Nome and Sour Lake for sixth through eighth grades, and then to the Hardin-Jefferson High School for ninth through twelfth grades.

Both old China Elementary and the old Henderson Middle School used to be part of China School District prior to the consolidation of the local school districts. Before desegregation of schools nationwide in the 1950s, China Elementary (then China School) served white students, whereas Henderson served the African American population.
