= Wildwood, Texas =

- Census-designated place
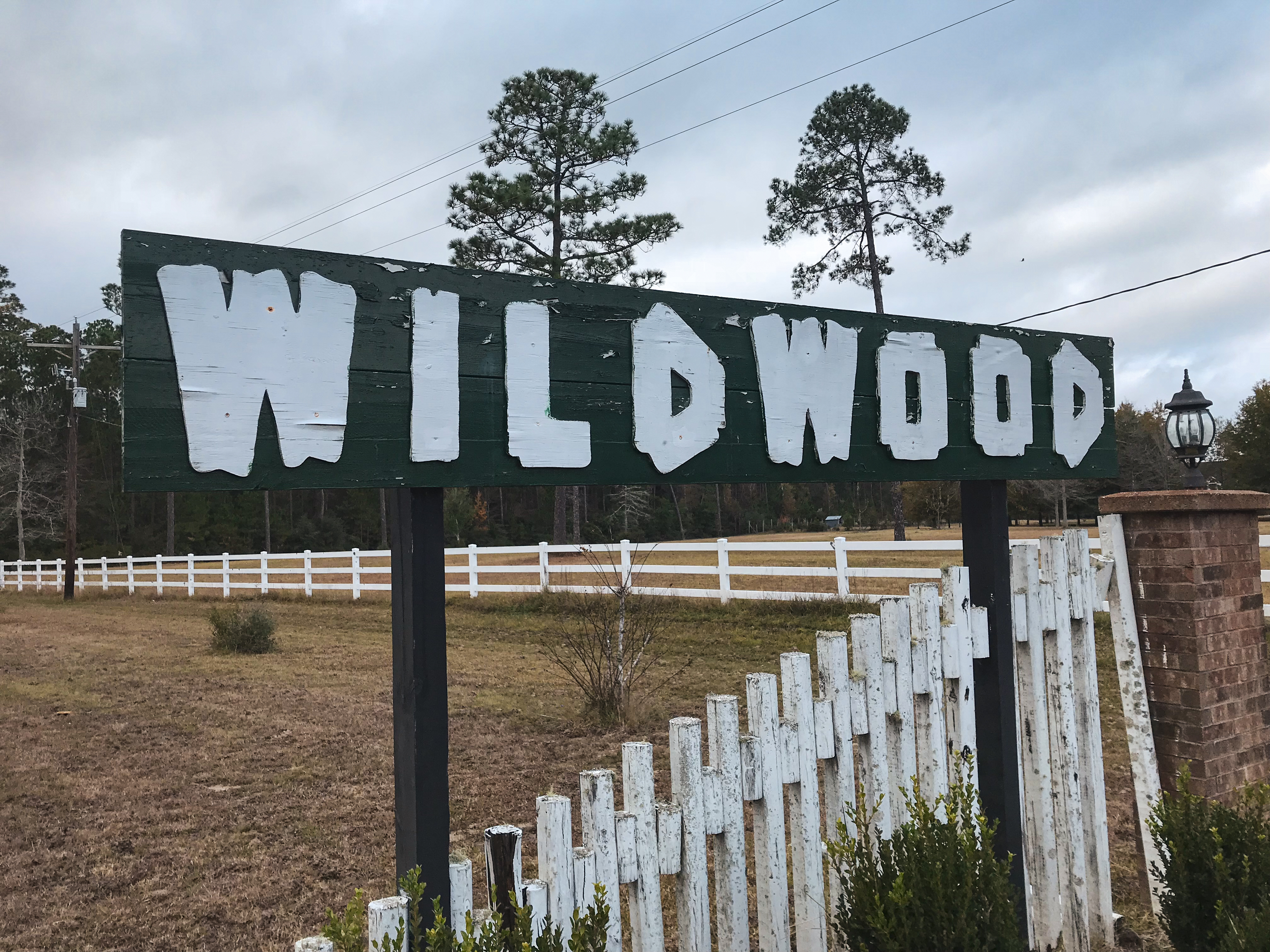

- Location within Texas Location within the United States
- Coordinates: 30°40′27″N 94°26′35″W
- Country: United States
- State: Texas
- Counties: Hardin, Tyler

Area
  - Total: 4.85 sq mi (12.56 km^{2})
  - Land: 4.51 sq mi (11.69 km^{2})
  - Water: 0.34 sq mi (0.87 km^{2})
- Elevation: 92 ft (28 m)

Population (2020)
  - Total: 1,121
  - Density: 274/sq mi (105.6/km^{2})
- Time zone: UTC-6 (Central (CST))
  - Summer (DST): UTC-5 (CDT)
- ZIP code: 77663
- Area code: 409
- FIPS code: 48-79204
- GNIS feature ID: 2587005

Wildwood is a gated community and census-designated place in Hardin and Tyler counties, Texas, United States. As of the 2020 census it had a population of 1,121. The Hardin county portion of Wildwood is part of the Beaumont–Port Arthur Metropolitan Statistical Area.

== Geography ==
Wildwood is located in northern Hardin County and southwestern Tyler County, 2 miles (3 km) west of US Highways 69 / 287 and the older community of Village Mills. Wildwood is built around Lake Kimball, a reservoir on Kimball Creek, a tributary of Village Creek and part of the Neches River watershed. The community is 22 miles (35 km) south of Woodville, the Tyler county seat, and 13 miles (21 km) northwest of Kountze, the Hardin county seat. Wildwood is 38 miles (61 km) northwest of Beaumont.

According to the U.S. Census Bureau, the CDP has a total area of 4.8 square miles (12.5 km^{2}), of which 4.5 square miles (11.7 km^{2}) are land and 0.3 square miles (0.9 km^{2}), or 6.91%, are water.

=== Climate ===
Climate data for Wildwood, Texas (1991–2020)
Month	Jan	Feb	Mar	Apr	May	Jun	Jul	Aug	Sep	Oct	Nov	Dec	Year
Mean daily maximum °F (°C)	62.5 (16.9)	66.0 (18.9)	73.3 (22.9)	80.3 (26.8)	86.6 (30.3)	92.4 (33.6)	94.7 (34.8)	94.7 (34.8)	90.3 (32.4)	82.5 (28.1)	72.4 (22.4)	64.1 (17.8)	80.0 (26.6)
Daily mean °F (°C)	50.4 (10.2)	54.0 (12.2)	61.0 (16.1)	67.5 (19.7)	75.3 (24.1)	81.2 (27.3)	83.6 (28.7)	83.5 (28.6)	78.7 (25.9)	69.3 (20.7)	59.5 (15.3)	52.3 (11.3)	68.0 (20.0)
Mean daily minimum °F (°C)	38.3 (3.5)	41.9 (5.5)	48.7 (9.3)	54.7 (12.6)	64.0 (17.8)	70.1 (21.2)	72.5 (22.5)	72.2 (22.3)	67.1 (19.5)	56.1 (13.4)	46.5 (8.1)	40.4 (4.7)	56.0 (13.4)
Average precipitation inches (mm)	4.74 (120)	4.14 (105)	4.12 (105)	4.47 (114)	4.52 (115)	5.83 (148)	4.11 (104)	4.31 (109)	4.51 (115)	5.56 (141)	5.38 (137)	5.39 (137)	57.08 (1,450)
Average snowfall inches (cm)	0.0 (0.0)	0.0 (0.0)	0.0 (0.0)	0.0 (0.0)	0.0 (0.0)	0.0 (0.0)	0.0 (0.0)	0.0 (0.0)	0.0 (0.0)	0.0 (0.0)	0.0 (0.0)	0.1 (0.25)	0.1 (0.25)
Source: NOAA

== Demographics ==
Historical population
Census	Pop.	Note	%±
2010	1,235		—
2020	1,121		−9.2%
U.S. Decennial Census; 1850–1900 1910; 1920 1930 1940; 1950 1960 1970; 1980 1990 2000; 2010 2020

Wildwood first appeared as a census designated place in the 2010 U.S. census.

Wildwood CDP, Texas – Racial and ethnic composition Note: the US Census treats Hispanic/Latino as an ethnic category. This table excludes Latinos from the racial categories and assigns them to a separate category. Hispanics/Latinos may be of any race.
Race / Ethnicity (NH = Non-Hispanic)	Pop 2010	Pop 2020	% 2010	% 2020
White alone (NH)	1,182	1,038	95.71%	92.60%
Black or African American alone (NH)	2	2	0.16%	0.18%
Native American or Alaska Native alone (NH)	5	3	0.40%	0.27%
Asian alone (NH)	7	1	0.57%	0.09%
Native Hawaiian or Pacific Islander alone (NH)	1	1	0.08%	0.09%
Other race alone (NH)	2	3	0.16%	0.27%
Mixed race or Multiracial (NH)	5	25	0.40%	2.23%
Hispanic or Latino (any race)	31	48	2.51%	4.28%
Total	1,235	1,121	100.00%	100.00%

As of the 2020 United States census, there were 1,121 people, 352 households, and 253 families residing in the CDP.

== Recreation ==
Lake Kimball provides the opportunity for Wildwood residents to enjoy boating, fishing, and water skiing. There are also an 18-hole golf course, a tennis court, baseball field, and basketball court. Residents enjoy a man-made beach and swimming area. Close to the beach is a small park with playground equipment and picnic tables.

== Education ==
The Warren Independent School District (based in Tyler County, and covering all parts of Wildwood in Tyler County and most of Wildwood in Hardin County) and Kountze Independent School District (based in Hardin County and covering portions to the west in Hardin County) cover sections of the CDP.

The Texas Legislature designates Tyler County as being in the district of Angelina College. The legislature does not specify a community college for the Hardin County side.

== Churches ==
Two churches serve the community. The Wildwood Village Mills United Methodist Church is located just outside the community gate, while Wildwood Baptist Church is located inside the gated community.

== See also ==
- John Henry Kirby
