= Pinewood Estates, Texas =

- Census-designated place
- Coordinates: 30°10′09″N 94°19′14″W
- Country: United States
- State: Texas
- County: Hardin

Area
  - Total: 13.25 sq mi (34.33 km^{2})
  - Land: 13.19 sq mi (34.16 km^{2})
  - Water: 0.066 sq mi (0.17 km^{2})
- Elevation: 30 ft (9.1 m)

Population (2020)
  - Total: 1,641
  - Density: 124.4/sq mi (48.04/km^{2})
- Time zone: UTC-6 (Central (CST))
  - Summer (DST): UTC-5 (CDT)
- ZIP code: 77659
- Area code: 409
- FIPS code: 48-57752
- GNIS feature ID: 2409073

Pinewood Estates is an unincorporated community and census-designated place (CDP) in Hardin County, Texas, United States. The population was 1,641 at the 2020 census. It is part of the Beaumont–Port Arthur Metropolitan Statistical Area.

== Geography ==
Pinewood Estates is located in southern Hardin County. Texas State Highway 105 forms the southern boundary of the community, leading east 9 miles (14 km) to the U.S. Route 69 freeway in northern Beaumont and west 5 miles (8 km) to Sour Lake.

According to the United States Census Bureau, the CDP has a total area of 13.2 square miles (34.3 km^{2}), of which 0.066 square miles (0.17 km^{2}), or 0.50%, are water.

== Demographics ==
Historical population
| Census | Pop. | Note | %± |
|---|---|---|---|
| 1990 | 1,174 | | — |
| 2000 | 1,633 | | 39.1% |
| 2010 | 1,678 | | 2.8% |
| 2020 | 1,641 | | −2.2% |
U.S. Decennial Census; 1850–1900 1910; 1920 1930 1940; 1950 1960 1970; 1980 1990 2000; 2010 2020

Pinewood Estates first appeared as a census designated place in the 1990 U.S. census.

=== 2020 census ===
Pinewood Estates CDP, Texas – Racial and ethnic composition Note: the US Census treats Hispanic/Latino as an ethnic category. This table excludes Latinos from the racial categories and assigns them to a separate category. Hispanics/Latinos may be of any race.
| Race / Ethnicity (NH = Non-Hispanic) | Pop 2000 | Pop 2010 | Pop 2020 | % 2000 | % 2010 | % 2020 |
|---|---|---|---|---|---|---|
| White alone (NH) | 1,554 | 1,531 | 1,398 | 95.16% | 91.24% | 85.19% |
| Black or African American alone (NH) | 6 | 21 | 38 | 0.37% | 1.25% | 2.32% |
| Native American or Alaska Native alone (NH) | 5 | 7 | 6 | 0.31% | 0.42% | 0.37% |
| Asian alone (NH) | 6 | 8 | 10 | 0.37% | 0.48% | 0.61% |
| Native Hawaiian or Pacific Islander alone (NH) | 0 | 0 | 0 | 0.00% | 0.00% | 0.00% |
| Other race alone (NH) | 0 | 4 | 3 | 0.00% | 0.24% | 0.18% |
| Mixed race or Multiracial (NH) | 9 | 8 | 77 | 0.55% | 0.48% | 4.69% |
| Hispanic or Latino (any race) | 53 | 99 | 109 | 3.25% | 5.90% | 6.64% |
| Total | 1,633 | 1,678 | 1,641 | 100.00% | 100.00% | 100.00% |

=== 2000 census ===
As of the census of 2000, there were 1,633 people, 528 households, and 482 families residing in the CDP. The population density was 123.5 inhabitants per square mile (47.7/km^{2}). There were 539 housing units at an average density of 40.8 per square mile (15.8/km^{2}). The racial makeup of the CDP was 97.43% White, 0.37% African American, 0.43% Native American, 0.37% Asian, 0.55% from other races, and 0.86% from two or more races. Hispanic or Latino of any race were 3.25% of the population.

There were 528 households, out of which 46.4% had children under the age of 18 living with them, 84.1% were married couples living together, 5.1% had a female householder with no husband present, and 8.7% were non-families. 8.0% of all households were made up of individuals, and 4.2% had someone living alone who was 65 years of age or older. The average household size was 3.09 and the average family size was 3.27.

In the CDP, the population was spread out, with 28.4% under the age of 18, 8.6% from 18 to 24, 24.7% from 25 to 44, 30.4% from 45 to 64, and 8.0% who were 65 years of age or older. The median age was 41 years. For every 100 females, there were 103.9 males. For every 100 females age 18 and over, there were 100.3 males.

The median income for a household in the CDP was $72,917, and the median income for a family was $78,497. Males had a median income of $61,429 versus $31,985 for females. The per capita income for the CDP was $28,350. None of the population or families were below the poverty line.

== Education ==
Pinewood Estates is served by the Hardin-Jefferson Independent School District.
