= Warren High School (Warren, Texas) =

Location
- 375 FM 3290 S. Warren, Texas 77664; United States; 30.6113°N 94.3925°W

Information
- School type: Public high school
- School district: Warren Independent School District
- Principal: James Swinney.
- Teaching staff: 29.05 (FTE)
- Grades: 9-12
- Enrollment: 348 (2023-2024)
- Student to teacher ratio: 11.98
- Colors: Orange, black, and white
- Mascot: Warrior
- Website: Warren High School

Warren High School is a public high school in Warren, Texas, United States. It is part of the Warren Independent School District, which is located in southern Tyler County and extends into a small portion of northern Hardin County.

== Extracurricular Events ==
=== Athletics ===
The Warren Warriors compete in the following sports-

Track & Field, Boys Basketball, Golf, Tennis, Softball, Baseball, Football, Girls Basketball, Cheerleading, Volleyball, & Cross Country. The Athletic Director is Austin Smithey.

=== FFA ===
The Warren FFA Chapter is a member of the McGee Bend District of Area IX in the Texas FFA Association. The Warren FFA advisors are Rex Currie, Matt Swinney, and Jacob Spivey.

=== Band ===
The "Pride of Warren" marching band performs at all football games and competes in marching contests. The Band Director is Russell Hopkins.

== Notable Graduates ==
- John Elliot - Super Bowl winning football player
