= Bevil Oaks, Texas =

- City
- Interactive map of Bevil Oaks, Texas
- Coordinates: 30°09′06″N 94°16′16″W
- Country: United States
- State: Texas
- County: Jefferson

Area
  - Total: 2.06 sq mi (5.34 km^{2})
  - Land: 2.03 sq mi (5.26 km^{2})
  - Water: 0.031 sq mi (0.08 km^{2})
- Elevation: 26 ft (7.9 m)

Population (2020)
  - Total: 1,089
  - Density: 536/sq mi (207/km^{2})
- Time zone: UTC-6 (Central (CST))
  - Summer (DST): UTC-5 (CDT)
- ZIP Code: 77713
- Area code: 409
- FIPS code: 48-08128
- GNIS feature ID: 2409842
- Website: cityofbeviloaks.com

Bevil Oaks is a city in Jefferson County, Texas, United States. The population was 1,089 at the 2020 census. It is part of the Beaumont–Port Arthur Metropolitan Statistical Area.

== History ==
Bevil Oaks was formed from the sub-divisions of Bevil Acres and River Oaks sometime prior to the 1963 incorporation. The economy is largely dependent on that of the Golden Triangle.

== Geography ==
Bevil Oaks is located along the northern edge of Jefferson County and is bordered to the north and west by Pine Island Bayou, which forms the Hardin County line. Texas State Highway 105 forms the southern boundary of the city; SH 105 leads west 8 miles (13 km) to Sour Lake and east 6 miles (10 km) to U.S. Route 96. Beaumont is 12 miles (19 km) southeast of Bevil Oaks via SH 105 and US 96.

According to the United States Census Bureau, the city of Bevil Oaks has a total area of 2.0 square miles (5.3 km^{2}), of which 0.03 square miles (0.08 km^{2}), or 1.51%, are water.

== Demographics ==
Historical population
Census	Pop.	Note	%±
1970	663		—
1980	1,306		97.0%
1990	1,350		3.4%
2000	1,346		−0.3%
2010	1,274		−5.3%
2020	1,089		−14.5%
U.S. Decennial Census; 2020 Census

=== 2020 census ===
As of the 2020 census, Bevil Oaks had a population of 1,089. The median age was 38.6 years. 24.6% of residents were under the age of 18 and 17.2% of residents were 65 years of age or older. For every 100 females there were 105.5 males, and for every 100 females age 18 and over there were 105.2 males age 18 and over.

0% of residents lived in urban areas, while 100.0% lived in rural areas.

There were 384 households in Bevil Oaks, of which 40.1% had children under the age of 18 living in them. Of all households, 60.2% were married-couple households, 19.0% were households with a male householder and no spouse or partner present, and 17.2% were households with a female householder and no spouse or partner present. About 18.2% of all households were made up of individuals and 7.6% had someone living alone who was 65 years of age or older.

There were 508 housing units, of which 24.4% were vacant. Among occupied housing units, 89.1% were owner-occupied and 10.9% were renter-occupied. The homeowner vacancy rate was 9.2% and the rental vacancy rate was 23.6%.

Racial composition as of the 2020 census
Race	Percent
White	72.5%
Black or African American	10.6%
American Indian and Alaska Native	0.6%
Asian	1.2%
Native Hawaiian and Other Pacific Islander	0.2%
Some other race	6.2%
Two or more races	8.8%
Hispanic or Latino (of any race)	16.1%

=== 2000 census ===
As of the 2000 census, there were 1,346 people, 521 households, and 432 families residing in the city. The population density was 640.2 inhabitants per square mile (247.2/km^{2}). There were 552 housing units at an average density of 262.6 per square mile (101.4/km^{2}). The racial makeup of the city was 96.36% White, 2.01% African American, 0.15% Asian, 0.97% from other races, and 0.52% from two or more races. Hispanic or Latino of any race were 3.12% of the population.

There were 521 households, out of which 29.2% had children under the age of 18 living with them, 72.4% were married couples living together, 8.4% had a female householder with no husband present, and 16.9% were non-families. 14.6% of all households were made up of individuals, and 6.1% had someone living alone who was 65 years of age or older. The average household size was 2.58 and the average family size was 2.83.

In the city, the population was spread out, with 20.4% under the age of 18, 8.2% from 18 to 24, 22.7% from 25 to 44, 32.9% from 45 to 64, and 15.8% who were 65 years of age or older. The median age was 44 years. For every 100 females, there were 103.3 males. For every 100 females age 18 and over, there were 97.6 males.

The median income for a household in the city was $55,982, and the median income for a family was $59,375. Males had a median income of $47,596 versus $23,906 for females. The per capita income for the city was $26,273. About 2.0% of families and 4.3% of the population were below the poverty line, including 6.3% of those under age 18 and 4.0% of those age 65 or over.

== Education ==
It is in the Hardin-Jefferson Independent School District.

From its inception until 2018, Bevil Oaks was served by the Beaumont Independent School District. In 2017 the zoned schools for Bevil Oaks were Roy Guess Elementary School, Martin Luther King Jr. Middle School, and either Central High School or West Brook High School.

On March 5, 2018, Mike Morath, the Texas Commissioner of Education, signed an order granting detachment from Beaumont ISD and annexation into Hardin-Jefferson Independent School District. Citizens of Bevil Oaks presented a petition for detachment to Beaumont ISD on April 20, 2017. The same petition requesting annexation was presented to Hardin-Jefferson ISD on May 1, 2017. Beaumont ISD denied the citizens' request, where H-J ISD gave their approval. A subsequent appeal was filed by the citizens with the Texas Education Agency on June 23, 2017. An Administrative Law Judge in Austin ruled in December 2017 that the citizens' request for detachment was legal. Beaumont ISD reached an agreement with petitioners the week of March 5, 2018 that ultimately granted detachment of the small community.

Effective July 1, 2018, the city of Bevil Oaks was scheduled to be in the Hardin-Jefferson Independent School District.

The Texas Legislature does not specify a community college area for most of Jefferson County. As a result, no community college is specified for Bevil Oaks.

== Law enforcement ==
As of 2011, Bevil Oaks is served by the Jefferson County Sheriff's Office. Until 2011, Bevil Oaks was served by a City Marshal. Once an elected position that began circa 1967, it was converted to an appointed position in 1983. The first and only elected City Marshal was Herman Ritchie, who served from 1967 to 1983. Larry K. Arnold was the first appointed City Marshal and served from 1983 to 1985.

== Fire department ==
Jefferson County Emergency Services District #1, which was established in 1991, has its station in Bevil Oaks. Bevil Oaks is in ESD 1's coverage area.
