= Hardin-Jefferson Independent School District =

School district in Texas, United States

Address
- 520 West Herring Sour Lake, Texas, 77659; United States

District information
- Type: Public
- Grades: PK–12
- Schools: 5
- NCES District ID: 4822410

Students and staff
- Students: 2,754 (2023–2024)
- Teachers: 183.00 (on an FTE basis) (2023–2024)
- Staff: 190.80 (on an FTE basis) (2023–2024)
- Student–teacher ratio: 15.05 (2023–2024)

Other information
- Website: www.hjisd.net

Hardin-Jefferson Independent School District is a public school district based in Sour Lake, Texas (USA). The district covers south-central Hardin and northwestern Jefferson counties.

In addition to Sour Lake, the district serves the cities of China, Nome, and Bevil Oaks, as well as the unincorporated community of Pinewood Estates, and parts of Beaumont's extraterritorial jurisdiction (west of Major Drive and Highway 90).

In 2009, the school district was rated "recognized" by the Texas Education Agency.

== History ==
In 2017, the site of the original Henderson Middle School was damaged by flooding from Hurricane Harvey, with the storm causing $30,000,000 in damages.

Residents of Bevil Oaks repeatedly requested being moved into HJISD for a period until 2018; previously the municipality was in the Beaumont Independent School District. BISD agreed to allow Bevil Oaks to move into HJISD, which was scheduled to be effective July 1, 2018.

As part of a cost-sharing agreement, the Federal Emergency Management Agency and the Army Corps of Engineers awarded the district nearly $27.82 million of federal funds in 2020 to help HJISD replace Henderson Middle School. The school district held two bond elections in 2020 to use the funds to build a new Henderson Middle School, as well as to fund other projects. Classes had been held in portable buildings. Work on the projects began in the summer of 2021. In 2023, the board of trustees voted to name the new building Hardin-Jefferson Junior High, saying it was part of aligning the school's name with other schools in the district. This was after approximately 60 years of a school being named in honor of former principal J.H. Henderson, remembered for his legacy surrounding integration as a Black educator.

== Schools ==
Hardin-Jefferson High School

Location
- 3155 Highway 326 South; Sour Lake, (Hardin County), Texas 77659; United States; 30.103865°N 94.405677°W

Information
- Type: Public high school
- Principal: Patrick Brown
- Staff: 53.24 (FTE)
- Enrollment: 782 (2023-24)
- Student to teacher ratio: 14.69
- Colors: Red, blue, and white
- Nickname: Hawks
- Website: Hardin-Jefferson High School

- Hardin-Jefferson High (Grades 9–12)
  - The high school campus, newly built for the '09-'10 school year, sits along Texas State Highway 326 next to its predecessor, now Henderson Middle School.
- Hardin-Jefferson Junior High (Grades 6–8)
  - Built along Texas 326 next to Hardin-Jefferson High School on the site of its predecessor Henderson Middle School.
- Sour Lake Elementary (Grades PK-5)
  - Serving, largely, that of the district that lies in Hardin County (as well as some Nome residents), the campus sits along Highway 326 south of Sour Lake.
- China Elementary (Grades PK-5)
  - Previously located in the center of China, the district instead allocated the old middle school campus (with considerable renovations) for use as the new elementary.

=== Former ===
- Henderson Middle (Grades 6–8)
  - Previously located in China where China Elementary now stands, the district relocated the middle school staff and students to the old high school campus in 2009. Shut down due to damages called by Hurricane Harvey.
- Henderson Village (Grades 6–8)
  - Portable classrooms opened in 2017 due to damages to Henderson Middle. Closed in 2023 due to new middle school opening.
  - China Elementary (Grades PK-5)
  - Closed in 2009 and the campus became the Hardin Jefferson Hunger initiative. Students were relocated to the new China Elementary

== Athletics ==
Hardin-Jefferson won the 2007 Boys Basketball State Championship, beating Abilene Wylie 56 to 44.

== Notable alumni ==
- Ben Broussard – Major League Baseball first baseman
