= Geater Davis =

- Birth name: Vernon Davis
- Born: January 29, 1946; Kountze, Texas, United States
- Died: September 29, 1984 (aged 38); Dallas, Texas
- Genres: R&B, soul, blues
- Occupation: Singer
- Years active: c.1968 – 1984
- Labels: House of Orange, Luna, 77, Ace, MT, others

Vernon "Geater" Davis (January 29, 1946 – September 29, 1984) was an American soul singer and songwriter. He has been described as "one of the South's great lost soul singers, an impassioned stylist whose voice was a combination of sweetness and sandpaper grit."

== Life and career ==
Davis was born in Kountze, Texas, the youngest of five children born to the late DeWitt and Cornella Davis (1908–1996). In the late 1960s he was heard performing, along with Reuben Bell, by record producer Allen Orange. Orange arranged for them to record in Birmingham, Alabama, and started his own House of Orange label to release their output. Geater's first release, "Sweet Woman's Love", in 1970, reached # 45 on the Billboard R&B chart. His follow-up singles on the House of Orange label, including "I Can Hold My Own" and "Best Of Luck To You", were less commercially successful, but he recorded an album, Sweet Woman's Love, which is now considered a classic of the deep soul genre. He often wrote or co-wrote his own material.

After Orange closed his label in 1972, Davis recorded for the Luna label, and then for John Richbourg's 77 label, where several of his recordings such as "I'm Gonna Change" and "A Whole Lot Of Man" were made at the FAME Studios in Muscle Shoals. His 1973 single, "Your Heart Is So Cold" reached # 64 on the R&B chart. During his career, Davis was often compared to fellow blues singer, and good friend, Bobby Blue Bland, because of their similar voice and vocal styling, but Davis' vocals were heavier and darker in tone. Also, Davis played guitar in the studio, as well as live, something Bland did not do. However, Davis' records did not generally sell well, despite heavy touring on the blues and chitlin circuits. He recorded for the Ace label in the mid 1970s, and later issued some disco singles on the revitalised House Of Orange label. In 1981 he joined the MT label run by James Bennett in Jackson, Mississippi, which issued several singles and an album, Better Days.

Davis died of a heart attack in Dallas, Texas, in 1984 at the age of 38, leaving behind his wife, Lula Davis; his two daughters Vernecia and Laquita Davis; and stepdaughter Sandra Darby. In 1985, as a tribute to his friend, Bobby Blue Bland re-recorded two of Davis' most popular tracks on his Members Only album: "Sweet Woman's Love", and "I've Just Got To Know".

In 1998, West Side Records released Sadder Shades of Blue: The Southern Soul Sessions 1971–76, a compilation covering most of Davis' recordings, other than those for House of Orange. His remaining material, I'll Play The Blues For You: The Legendary House Of Orange Sessions, was released in 2008.

== Discography ==
=== Singles ===
- "Sweet Woman's Love" / "Don't Marry A Fool" (House Of Orange 2401, 1970)
- "My Love Is So Strong For You" / "I Can Hold My Own" (House Of Orange 2402, 1971)
- "For Your Precious Love" / "Wrapped Up In You" (House Of Orange 2405, 1971)
- "Best Of Luck To You" / "I Know (My Baby Loves Me)" (House Of Orange 2407, 1971)
- "I'm Gonna Change" / "I've Got To Pay The Price" (Luna 801, 1972)
- "Don't Walk Off (And Leave Me)" / "I Don't Worry (About Jody)" (Luna 804, 1972)
- "Long Cold Winter" / "Why Does It Hurt So Bad" (Seventy Seven 124, 1973)
- "Your Heart Is So Cold" / "You Made Your Bed Hard" (Seventy Seven 130, 1973)
- "I'm Gonna Change" / "I've Got To Pay The Price" (Seventy Seven 136, 1973)
- "Nice and Easy" / "Strange Sensation" (Ace 3006, 1974)
- "I'll Play the Blues for You" / "My Love is So Strong for You" (Odds and Ends 7600, 1975)
- "Tired of Busting My Brain" / "There's Got to Be Some Changes Made" (Ace 3019, 1976)
- "Cold Love" / "Short version" (House of Orange 2410, 1977)
- "Disco Music" / "I'll Play the Blues for You" (House of Orange 79100, 1979)
- "Wherever You Are" / "Pt 2" (Sun Belt 7179, 1979)
- "Right Back For More" / "Pt 2" (MT 001, 1981)
- "I'll Take Care of You" / "Right Back For More" (MT 002, 1981)
- "Booty Music" / "Breath Taking Girl" (House of Orange 2615, 1982)
- "Don't Give Up" / "Better Days" (MT 005, 1983)
- "Baby Love" / "Go Your Way" (MT 007, 1983)

=== Albums ===
Sweet Woman's Love (House of Orange 6000, 1971)
Better Days (MT LP 0001, 1983)
