= Warren Independent School District =

School district in Texas, United States

Address
- 375 FM 3290 South Warren, Texas, 77664; United States

District information
- Type: Public
- Grades: PK–12
- Schools: 4
- NCES District ID: 4844580

Students and staff
- Students: 1,197 (2023–2024)
- Teachers: 95.93 (on an FTE basis) (2023–2024)
- Staff: 122.13 (on an FTE basis) (2023–2024)
- Student–teacher ratio: 12.48 (2023–2024)

Other information
- Website: www.warrenisd.net

Warren Independent School District is a public school district based in the community of Warren, Texas (USA).

Located in Tyler County, the district extends into a small portion of Hardin County. Other communities in the district include Fred, Village Mills, a part of Ivanhoe, and a part of Wildwood.

In 2009, the school district was rated "recognized" by the Texas Education Agency.

== Schools ==
- Warren High School (Grades 9-12)
- Warren Junior High School (Grades 6-8)
- Fred Elementary School (Grades PK-5)
- Warren Elementary School (Grades PK-5)
