= Kirby–Hill House =

- Kirby-Hill House
- U.S. National Register of Historic Places
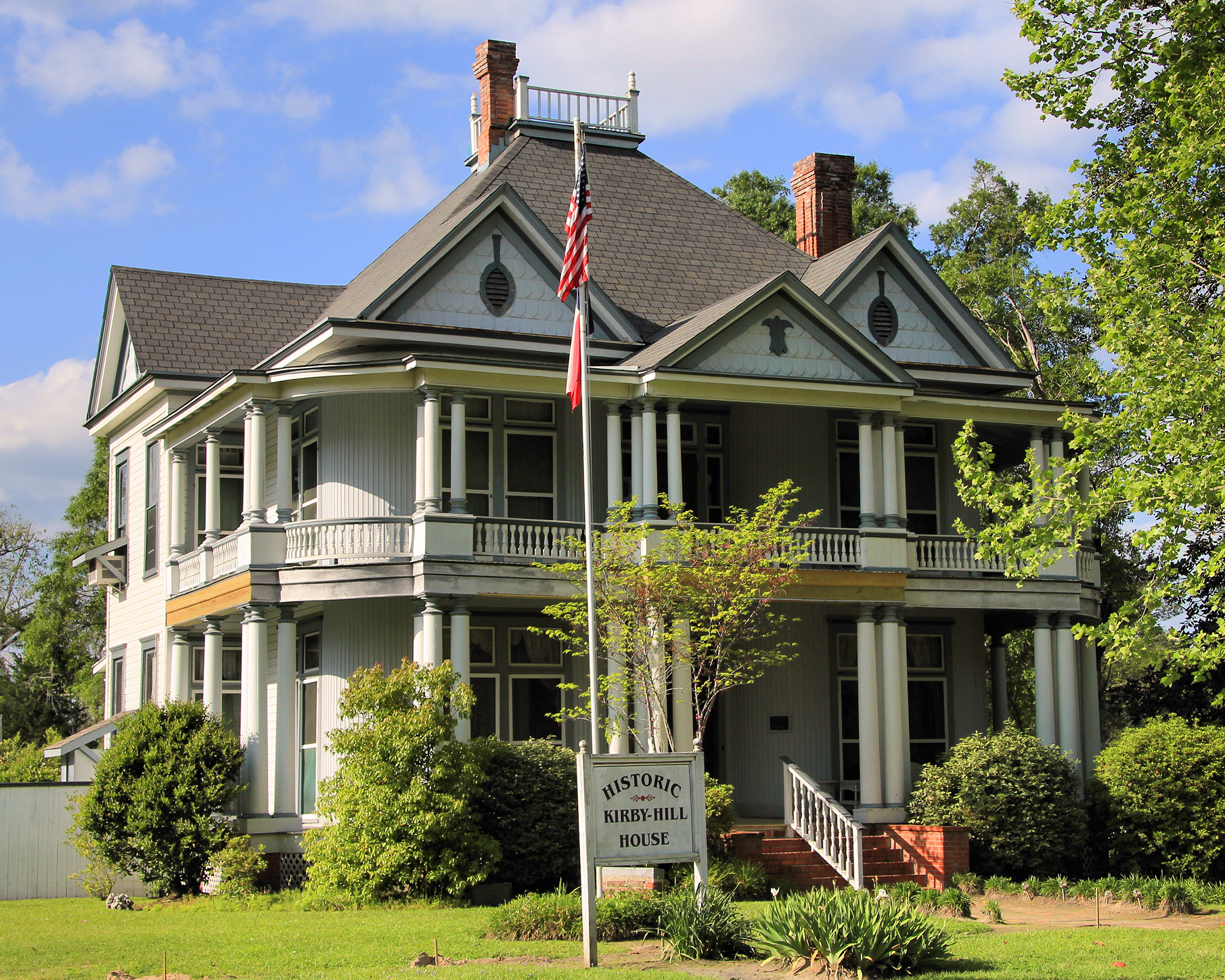

- Location within Texas Location within the United States
- Location: 210 Main St., Kountze, Texas
- Coordinates: 30°22′12″N 94°18′55″W
- Area: 2.3 acres (0.93 ha)
- Built: 1902
- Built by: Frank T. Smith
- Architectural style: Colonial Revival, Queen Anne
- NRHP reference No.: 99000610
- Added to NRHP: May 20, 1999

The Kirby–Hill House, at 210 Main St. in Kountze, Texas, was built in 1902. It was listed on the National Register of Historic Places in 1999. It is also a Recorded Texas Historic Landmark.

It is a Queen Anne-style house with Colonial Revival details.

The house occupies eight city lots, about 2.3 acres (0.93 ha). Its most prominent feature is its two-story wraparound porch, which has 22 Tuscan columns on each level.
