= Charles Bilal =

American politician

Charles Bilal was mayor of Kountze, Texas, USA. He is notable for being the first Muslim in America to be elected as an American Muslim to a US municipality.

Bilal lives in Kountze where, in 1991, he was elected as the first Muslim mayor of a US municipality. He is a motivational speaker and has had invitations to Saudi Arabia, sponsored by the Royal Embassy of Saudi Arabia. In 1994, Bilal participated in a political council on how American Muslims can be elected to political offices.

He was the first US mayor to receive an official invitation from the Consulate General of the Republic of Indonesia via the owner of Amanah magazine, Lukman Umar. During his ten-day visit in 1993, he spoke to audiences on the importance of American Muslim elections to the political arena.

== Accomplishments ==
- Appointment as member of the World Council of Mayors by the Hon. Mayor Johnny Ford of Tuskegee, Alabama. Ford was the founder of the National Conference of Black Mayors in Washington, D.C., on April 28, 1994.
- In 1994, Bilal arranged the visit by Muhammad Ali to Kountze, initiating funding for a youth center.
- Bilal was a sponsor at the DeQuincy Louisiana State Prison giving motivational lectures to the Muslim community within the institution, 1970–1993.
