= Kaiser Burnout =

Fire set during American Civil War

The Kaiser Burnout was a fire set by Confederate Captain James Kaiser during the American Civil War in Hardin county in the Big Thicket area of Southeast Texas.

== Historical background ==
Like their counterparts in the Kansas region, local Texans that lived in the Big Thicket forest region who refused to fight for the Confederacy were referred to as Jayhawkers. Unlike the Kansas Jayhawkers, the Big Thicket Jayhawkers were not known to be guerrilla fighters. The Big Thicket was a good place to hide, and Sam Houston had planned to hide his army there had he lost the Battle of San Jacinto. Sometime after April 1862, people who were drafted and didn't want to fight for the Confederate Army during the Civil War hid in the Big Thicket and became known as Jayhawkers.

The Big Thicket Jayhawkers were initial followers of Sam Houston and fully believed that the Civil War was a "rich man's war and a poor man's fight". Randolph Fillingim stated that Jayhawkers "...were sensible men. They knew what would happen if the slaves were not freed. It wouldn't be long till the men who had money to start a business of any kind would buy slaves for his labor and poor whites would be left out." A few of these Big Thicket Jayhawkers' names are accounted for: Warren Collins, Stace Collins, Newt Collins, Lige Cain and Jim Williford.

Although the Jayhawkers lacked coffee and tobacco they had plenty of game and fish. They would live off of the land's wild fruit and often salvaged corn sacks from timber camps for clothing. Due to the numerous beehives near Honey Island, a vast concentration of these Jayhawkers formed a camp nearby. The Jayhawkers would cut down a tree and take the honey. Where Honey Island is now, there were (at that time) two big pear trees that the Jayhawkers had built a table between. The Jayhawkers would place honey and game on the table for their families to come and pick up and take to Beaumont to sell. With the money from the sold goods they were able to buy many goods they lacked such as tobacco, coffee and ammunition. Sympathetic locals would also bring supplies to this encampment, often in exchange for the honey that was collected.

== Escape ==
In the spring of 1865, a Confederate captain named Charlie Bullock captured some of these refugees and locked them up in a wooden shack near Woodville, but they managed to escape. According to Lance Rosier and Cecil Overstreet, when the Jayhawkers were brought to Woodville there were guards placed all around them. In order to free the men, whiskey was brought by a local sympathizer and the fiddle playing ensued. One of the Jayhawkers, Mr. Warren Collins, snuck his pocket knife in tucked away in his boot. Using some backwoods ingenuity the Jayhawkers pried a floor plank up in the floor of the shack. As the fiddle playing continued, Warren began to dance a "jig" entertaining the inebriated guards. As Warren danced about, the Jayhawkers escaped one by one through the plank lifted up in the floor. In the commotion that followed, Mr. Collins crawled out from the wooden shack and simply walked to freedom.

== Fire ==
Shortly after the escape, Confederate Captain James Kaiser set fire to the canebrake region near Honey Island to flush the Jayhawkers out. The fire did not harm any of the Jayhawkers, only the surrounding thicket. According to Lance Rosier, "you take all the Collins'—this whole place is full of them—well, their ancestors [were] Jayhawkers. If any of them had gotten burned in the fire someone would have known about it." The fire burned for two days and the intense heat permanently destroyed the canebrake. Over 3,000 acres (12 km^{2}) of the Big Thicket forest burned as well.
