= Pinehurst, Orange County, Texas =

Pinehurst, Texas
- City
- Location of Pinehurst, Texas
- Coordinates: 30°06′11″N 93°45′10″W
- Country: United States
- State: Texas
- County: Orange

Area
  - Total: 1.72 sq mi (4.45 km^{2})
  - Land: 1.71 sq mi (4.42 km^{2})
  - Water: 0.0077 sq mi (0.02 km^{2})
- Elevation: 7 ft (2.1 m)

Population (2020)
  - Total: 2,232
  - Density: 1,156.8/sq mi (446.66/km^{2})
- Time zone: UTC-6 (Central (CST))
  - Summer (DST): UTC-5 (CDT)
- ZIP code: 77630
- Area code: 409
- FIPS code: 48-57608
- GNIS feature ID: 2411425
- Website: www.cityofpinehursttexas.com

Pinehurst is a city in Orange County, Texas, United States. The population was 2,232 at the 2020 census. It is part of the Beaumont–Port Arthur Metropolitan Statistical Area.

== Geography ==
According to the United States Census Bureau, the city has a total area of 1.8 square miles (4.6 km^{2}), all land.

== Demographics ==
Historical population
Census	Pop.	Note	%±
1960	1,703		—
1970	2,198		29.1%
1980	2,928		33.2%
1990	2,682		−8.4%
2000	2,274		−15.2%
2010	2,097		−7.8%
2020	2,232		6.4%
U.S. Decennial Census

Pinehurst racial composition as of 2020 (NH = Non-Hispanic) (Note: Note: the US Census treats Hispanic/Latino as an ethnic category. This table excludes Latinos from the racial categories and assigns them to a separate category. Hispanics/Latinos can be of any race.)
Race	Number	Percentage
White (NH)	1,415	63.4%
Black or African American (NH)	336	15.05%
Native American or Alaska Native (NH)	15	0.67%
Asian (NH)	32	1.43%
Pacific Islander (NH)	1	0.04%
Some Other Race (NH)	13	0.58%
Mixed/Multi-Racial (NH)	93	4.17%
Hispanic or Latino	327	14.65%
Total	2,232	

As of the 2020 United States census, there were 2,232 people, 914 households, and 617 families residing in the city.

As of the census of 2000, there were 2,274 people, 962 households, and 605 families residing in the city. The population density was 1,280.8 inhabitants per square mile (494.5/km^{2}). There were 1,059 housing units at an average density of 596.5 per square mile (230.3/km^{2}). The racial makeup of the city was 85.97% White, 8.75% African American, 0.66% Native American, 0.66% Asian, 1.93% from other races, and 2.02% from two or more races. Hispanic or Latino of any race were 4.79% of the population.

There were 962 households, out of which 22.1% had children under the age of 18 living with them, 49.8% were married couples living together, 10.0% had a female householder with no husband present, and 37.1% were non-families. 33.9% of all households were made up of individuals, and 19.0% had someone living alone who was 65 years of age or older. The average household size was 2.26 and the average family size was 2.84.

In the city, the population was spread out, with 20.4% under the age of 18, 7.7% from 18 to 24, 22.2% from 25 to 44, 25.6% from 45 to 64, and 24.1% who were 65 years of age or older. The median age was 45 years. For every 100 females, there were 85.3 males. For every 100 females age 18 and over, there were 81.6 males.

The median income for a household in the city was $32,827, and the median income for a family was $41,563. Males had a median income of $34,196 versus $24,018 for females. The per capita income for the city was $19,482. About 15.6% of families and 17.2% of the population were below the poverty line, including 27.7% of those under age 18 and 14.3% of those age 65 or over.

== Education ==
The City of Pinehurst is served by the West Orange-Cove Consolidated Independent School District.
