= John Elliott (defensive lineman) =

American football player (1944–2010)

No. 80
- Positions: Defensive tackle, Defensive end

Personal information
- Born: October 26, 1944; Beaumont, Texas, U.S.
- Died: November 11, 2010 (aged 66); Houston, Texas, U.S.
- Listed height: 6 ft 4 in (1.93 m)
- Listed weight: 244 lb (111 kg)

Career information
- High school: Warren (Warren, Texas)
- College: Texas
- NFL draft: 1967: 7th round, 71st overall pick

Career history
- New York Jets (1967–1973); New York Stars (1974)

Awards and highlights
- Super Bowl champion (III); AFL champion (1968); First-team All-Pro (1970); First-team All-AFL (1969); Second-team All-AFL (1968); Pro Bowl (1970); 2× AFL All-Star (1968, 1969); All-WFL (1974)

Career NFL/AFL statistics
- Fumble recoveries: 4
- Safeties: 1
- Sacks: 38.5
- Stats at Pro Football Reference

Darrell John Elliott (October 26, 1944 – November 11, 2010) was an American professional football player who was a defensive tackle for seven seasons with the New York Jets of the American Football League (AFL) and later National Football League (NFL). He played college football for the Texas Longhorns, earning second-team all-conference honors in the Southwest Conference (SWC). Elliot was selected by the Jets in the seventh round of the 1967 NFL/AFL draft. He was a three-time all-star and three-time all-league selection, and won Super Bowl III with the Jets. He also played one season with the New York Stars of the World Football League, earning All-WFL honors once.

== Early life ==
Elliott was born in Beaumont, Texas and played high school football at nearby Warren High School.

== College Football ==
He played collegiately for the University of Texas where he was second-team All-SWC as a junior, even playing with an injury, but missed six games with a knee injury as a senior. He also played his sophomore season with an injured shoulder and broke his leg in the Orange Bowl against future teammate Joe Namath and the Crimson Tide

== Professional Football ==
In 1967, Elliott was drafted in the seventh round by the American Football League's New York Jets. He was mostly a back-up and special teams player in his rookie year. In his second season, he started for the Jets in their defeat of the Oakland Raiders in the 1968 AFL Championship Game, and then in the third AFL-NFL World Championship Game, helping them defeat the heavily favored Baltimore Colts in one of the AFL's greatest games. He was 2nd team All-Pro that year.

He played for the AFL's Jets through 1969, earning first team All-Pro honors that year, and then for the National Football League Jets from 1970 through 1973. He was a Pro-Bowler three years in a row from 1968 to 1970 and was second-team-team All-NFL in 1970 and the team's MVP. In 1971, he suffered a knee injury that ended his season, and eventually his career. He came back in 1972, but over the next two seasons his production was down and he suffered further injuries.

Instead of returning to the Jets, Elliott sought a bigger paycheck with the New York Stars/Charlotte Hornets of the World Football League in 1974. He moved the team to Charlotte mid-season, made the All-WFL team and was the team's player representative; but Elliott never got all the money he was promised.

== Personal life ==
Following his football career, he served as a sheriff in Texas and later established an oilfield service company with his wife. John Elliott died of cancer at MD Anderson Hospital in Houston on November 11, 2010.

== See also ==
- List of American Football League players
