= Beaumont–Port Arthur metropolitan area =

Golden Triangle
- Metropolitan statistical area
- Beaumont–Port Arthur, TX MSA
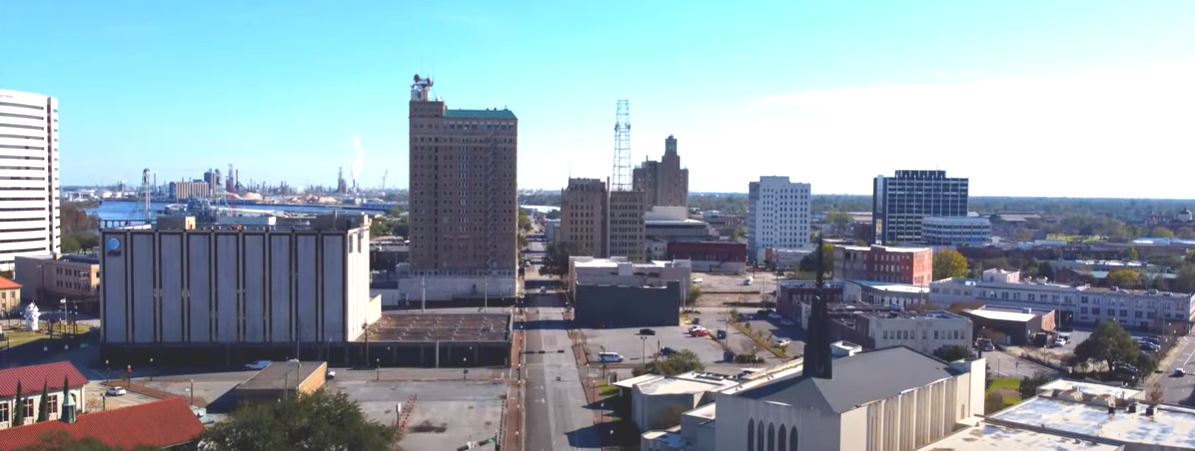
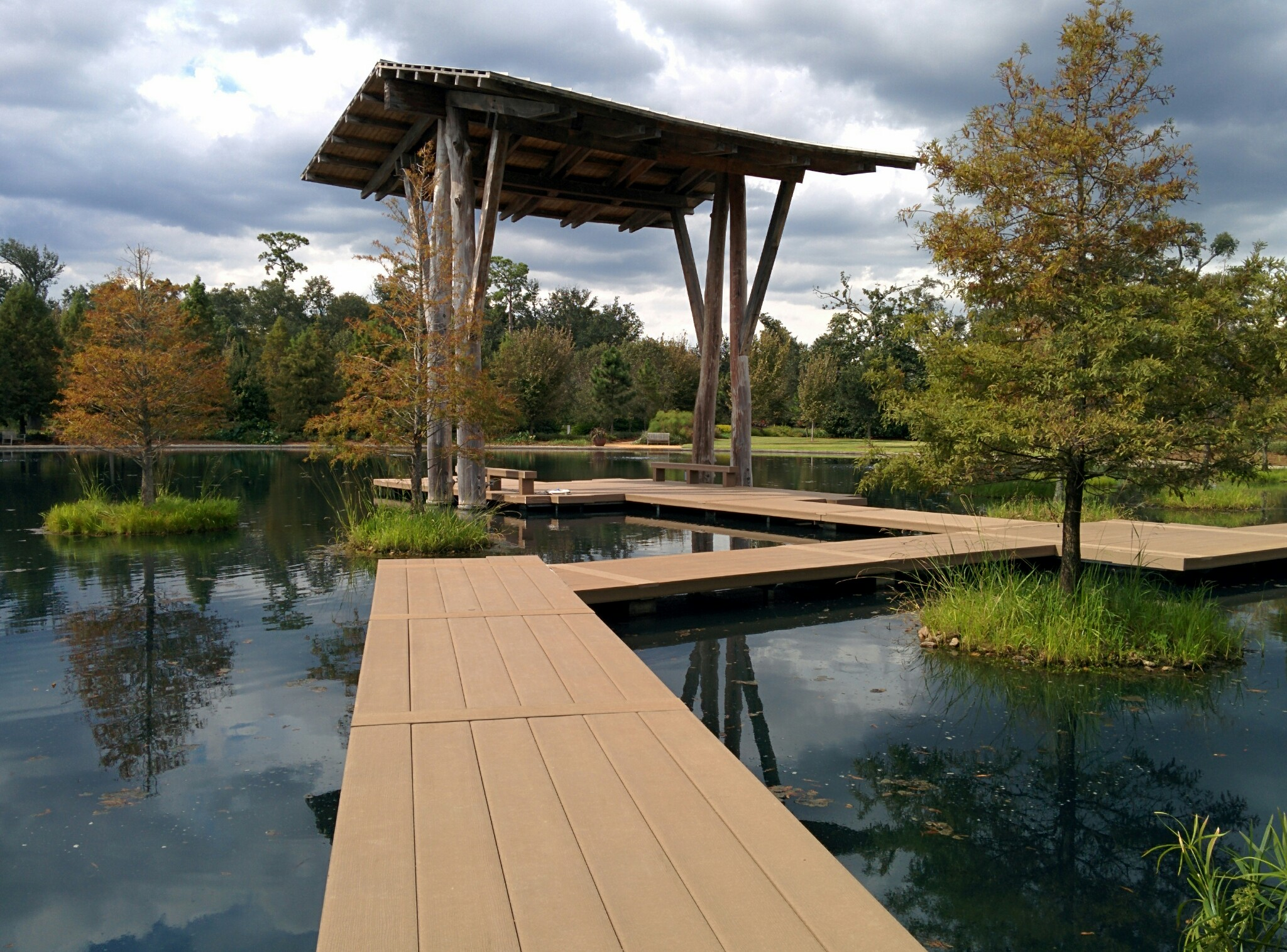
- From top to bottom: Beaumont, Port Arthur, Orange
Interactive Map of Beaumont–Port Arthur, TX MSA
City of Beaumont
City of Port Arthur
City of Orange
Beaumont–Port Arthur, TX MSA
- Coordinates: 30°05′N 94°02′W
- Country: United States
- State: Texas
- Largest city: Beaumont
- Other cities: Port Arthur; Orange

Area
  - Total: 2,388 sq mi (6,180 km^{2})
- Lowest elevation: 0 ft (0 m)

Population (2020)
  - Total: 397,565
  - Rank: 133rd in the U.S.
  - Density: 166.5/sq mi (64.28/km^{2})

GDP
  - Total: $29.007 billion (2022)
- Time zone: UTC-6 (CST)
  - Summer (DST): UTC-5 (CDT)

The Beaumont–Port Arthur metropolitan statistical area is a three-county region in Southeast Texas. The metropolitan area shares borders with the Houston–Pasadena–The Woodlands metropolitan area to the west and the Lake Charles metropolitan area in the U.S. state of Louisiana to the east. The area is also known as the Golden Triangle. The "golden" refers to the wealth that came from the Spindletop oil strike near Beaumont in 1901, and "triangle" refers to the area between the cities of Beaumont, Port Arthur, and Orange.

According to the 2000 census, it had a population of 385,090 (though the 2010 census placed the population at 388,745). Newton County was added to the metropolitan area in the February, 2013 delineation (OMB Bulletin 13–01); the addition of which increased the 2010 population by 14,445. At the 2020 census, the metropolitan area's population increased to 397,565, becoming the 139th most populous metropolitan statistical area in the U.S.

== Counties ==
County	Seat	2025 estimate	2020 Census	Change	Area	Density
Jefferson	Beaumont	254,321	256,526	−0.86%	1,113 sq mi (2,880 km^{2})	229/sq mi (88/km^{2})
Orange	Orange	86,266	84,808	+1.72%	380 sq mi (980 km^{2})	227/sq mi (88/km^{2})
Hardin	Kountze	58,723	56,231	+4.43%	898 sq mi (2,330 km^{2})	65/sq mi (25/km^{2})
Total		399,310	397,565	+0.44%	2,381 sq mi (6,170 km^{2})	168/sq mi (65/km^{2})

== Communities ==
The following are cities, towns, and villages categorized based on the United States Census Bureau 2025 population estimates. No population estimates are released for census-designated places (CDPs), which are marked with an asterisk (*). These places are categorized based on their 2020 Census population.

=== Places with more than 100,000 inhabitants ===
- Beaumont (Principal city) (112,967)

=== Places with 50,000 to 100,000 inhabitants ===
- Port Arthur (Principal city) (55,804)

=== Places with 10,000 to 49,999 inhabitants ===
- Orange (19,419)
- Nederland (18,108)
- Groves (16,907)
- Lumberton (14,123)
- Port Neches (13,768)

=== Places with fewer than 10,000 inhabitants ===
- Bridge City (9,645)
- Vidor (9,597)
- Silsbee (6,613)
- Central Gardens* (4,373)
- West Orange (3,391)
- Mauriceville* (2,983)
- Fannett* (2,363)
- Pinehurst (2,206)
- Kountze (2,127)
- Little Cypress* (1,968)
- Sour Lake (1,841)
- Pinewood Estates* (1,641)
- China (1,343)
- Forest Heights* (1,329)
- Wildwood* (partial) (1,121)
- Beauxart Gardens* (1,064)
- Bevil Oaks (1,042)
- Hamshire* (962)
- Pine Forest (504)
- Nome (472)
- Rose City (344)
- Rose Hill Acres (329)
- Taylor Landing (285)

=== Unincorporated places ===
- Batson
- Honey Island
- LaBelle
- Orangefield
- Saratoga
- Thicket
- Village Mills
- Votaw

== Demographics ==
In 2000, the metropolitan area's population was 385,090. According to the 2020 U.S. census, there were 397,565 people, 150,085 households, 101,240 families, and 169,646 housing units within the MSA. The racial makeup of the MSA was 56.31% White (non-Hispanic White 52.3%), 23.86% African American, 2.09% Native American, 2.88% Asian, 0.03% Pacific Islander, 8.09% from other races, and 2.83% from two or more races. Hispanic or Latino of any race were 17.51% of the population.

== See also ==
- List of Texas metropolitan areas
- United States metropolitan area
- List of United States metropolitan statistical areas by population
