= Texas State Highway 326 =

State highway in Texas

State Highway 326
- SH 326, highlighted in red

Route information
- Maintained by TxDOT
- Length: 24.372 mi (39.223 km)
- Existed: 1940–present

Major junctions
- South end: US 90 / FM 365 in Nome
- North end: US 69 / US 287 in Kountze

Location
- Country: United States
- State: Texas
- Counties: Jefferson, Hardin

Highway system
- Highways in Texas; Interstate; US; State; Former; Toll; Loops; Spurs; FM/RM; Park; Rec
← SH 325	→ SH 327

State Highway 326 (SH 326) is a 24.372-mile (39.223 km) state highway in the U.S. state of Texas. The highway begins at a junction with U.S. Highway 90 (US 90) and FM 365 in Nome and heads north to a junction with U.S. Highway 69 and US 287 in Kountze.

== History ==
SH 326 was designated on February 13, 1940 to serve as a route between Sour Lake and Kountze. On November 16, 1943, the route was extended to the south to Nome.

== Route description ==
SH 326 begins in East Texas at a junction with US 90 and FM 365 in Nome. It heads north from this junction to an intersection with SH 105 in Sour Lake. The highway continues to the north to an intersection with FM 421. Heading north, the highway continues to a junction with FM 770. The highway intersects FM 1293 as it enters the Kountze city limits. SH 326 reaches its northern terminus at US 69 and US 287 in Kountze.

== Junction list ==
County	Location	mi	km	Destinations	Notes
Jefferson	Nome			US 90 / FM 365 east – Beaumont, Liberty, Fannett	
Hardin	Sour Lake			SH 105 – Beaumont, Cleveland	
Hardin				FM 421 east – Lumberton	
Hardin				FM 770 south – Saratoga	
Hardin	Kountze			FM 1293 west – Honey Island	
Hardin	Kountze			US 69 / US 287 – Beaumont, Woodville	
1.000 mi = 1.609 km; 1.000 km = 0.621 mi
