= Rose Hill Acres, Texas =

- City
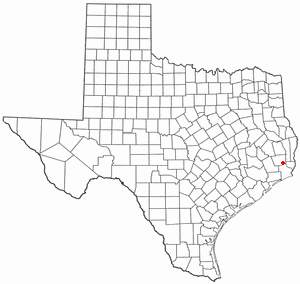
- Location in Texas

- Coordinates: 30°11′36″N 94°11′35″W
- Country: United States
- State: Texas
- County: Hardin

Area
  - Total: 0.41 sq mi (1.05 km^{2})
  - Land: 0.39 sq mi (1.00 km^{2})
  - Water: 0.015 sq mi (0.04 km^{2})
- Elevation: 30 ft (9.1 m)

Population (2020)
  - Total: 325
  - Density: 842/sq mi (325/km^{2})
- Time zone: UTC-6 (Central (CST))
  - Summer (DST): UTC-5 (CDT)
- ZIP code: 77657
- Area code: 409
- FIPS code: 48-63272
- GNIS feature ID: 2410995
- Website: cityofrosehillacres.org

Rose Hill Acres is a city in Hardin County, Texas, United States. The population was 325 at the 2020 census, down from 441 at the 2010 census. The city consists of two residential neighborhoods situated between Beaumont and Lumberton. It is part of the Beaumont–Port Arthur Metropolitan Statistical Area. Rose Hill Acres has a small government structure led by Mayor David Lang.

Rose Hill Acres is served by the Lumberton Independent School District and the Lumberton Municipal Utility District.

== Geography ==
Rose Hill Acres is located in extreme southern Hardin County. It is bounded on the south by Pine Island Bayou, an eastward-flowing tributary of the Neches River. Road access is provided by U.S. Highway 69, U.S. Route 96 and U.S. Highway 287, all three of which run concurrently in one freeway, collectively referred to as the Eastex Freeway. Downtown Beaumont is 9 miles (14 km) to the south, and Lumberton is 3 miles (5 km) to the north.

According to the United States Census Bureau, Rose Hill Acres has a total area of 0.39 square miles (1.0 km^{2}), of which 0.02 square miles (0.04 km^{2}), or 3.96%, are water.

== Historical development ==
This residential suburb of Beaumont was incorporated in 1968 by a 70 to 9 margin.

== Demographics ==
Historical population
Census	Pop.	Note	%±
1970	431		—
1980	460		6.7%
1990	468		1.7%
2000	480		2.6%
2010	441		−8.1%
2020	325		−26.3%
U.S. Decennial Census; 2020 Census

=== 2020 census ===
As of the 2020 census, Rose Hill Acres had a population of 325 and a median age of 39.9 years. 26.8% of residents were under the age of 18 and 16.9% of residents were 65 years of age or older. For every 100 females there were 97.0 males, and for every 100 females age 18 and over there were 90.4 males age 18 and over.

There were 120 households in Rose Hill Acres, of which 39.2% had children under the age of 18 living in them. Of all households, 55.0% were married-couple households, 16.7% were households with a male householder and no spouse or partner present, and 23.3% were households with a female householder and no spouse or partner present. About 22.5% of all households were made up of individuals and 12.5% had someone living alone who was 65 years of age or older.

There were 147 housing units, of which 18.4% were vacant. The homeowner vacancy rate was 3.5% and the rental vacancy rate was 27.8%.

100.0% of residents lived in urban areas, while 0.0% lived in rural areas.

Racial composition as of the 2020 census
Race	Number	Percent
White	291	89.5%
Black or African American	5	1.5%
American Indian and Alaska Native	0	0.0%
Asian	1	0.3%
Native Hawaiian and Other Pacific Islander	0	0.0%
Some other race	6	1.8%
Two or more races	22	6.8%
Hispanic or Latino (of any race)	16	4.9%

=== 2000 census ===
As of the census of 2000, there were 480 people, 169 households, and 141 families residing in the city. The population density was 1,185.9 inhabitants per square mile (457.9/km^{2}). There were 175 housing units at an average density of 432.4 per square mile (167.0/km^{2}). The racial makeup of the city was 96.88% White, 0.83% Native American, 0.21% Asian, 0.42% Pacific Islander, 0.62% from other races, and 1.04% from two or more races. Hispanic or Latino of any race were 4.79% of the population.

There were 169 households, out of which 37.3% had children under the age of 18 living with them, 74.6% were married couples living together, 5.9% had a female householder with no husband present, and 16.0% were non-families. 13.0% of all households were made up of individuals, and 10.1% had someone living alone who was 65 years of age or older. The average household size was 2.84 and the average family size was 3.11.

In the city, the population was spread out, with 27.3% under the age of 18, 5.6% from 18 to 24, 24.2% from 25 to 44, 25.6% from 45 to 64, and 17.3% who were 65 years of age or older. The median age was 40 years. For every 100 females, there were 96.7 males. For every 100 females age 18 and over, there were 90.7 males.

The median income for a household in the city was $50,313, and the median income for a family was $55,179. Males had a median income of $42,500 versus $23,750 for females. The per capita income for the city was $19,215. About 7.1% of families and 8.1% of the population were below the poverty line, including 11.7% of those under age 18 and 6.4% of those age 65 or over.
