= Roy Weatherly =

American baseball player (1915–1991)

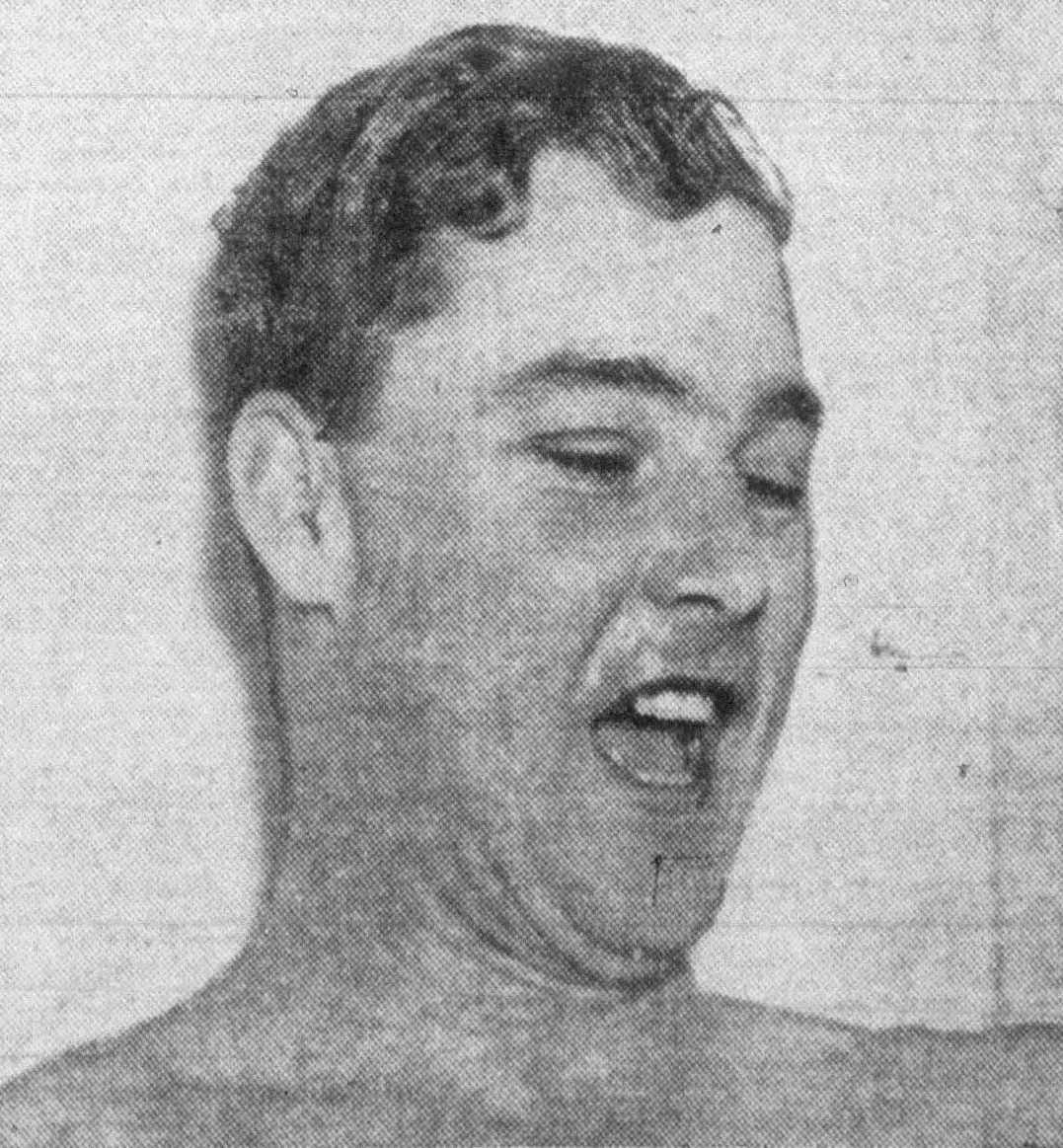
- Weatherly, circa 1942
- Outfielder
- Born: February 25, 1915; Warren, Tyler County, Texas, U.S.
- Died: January 19, 1991 (aged 75); Woodville, Texas, U.S.
- Batted: Left Threw: Right

MLB debut
- June 27, 1936, for the Cleveland Indians

Last MLB appearance
- October 1, 1950, for the New York Giants

MLB statistics
- Batting average: .286
- Home runs: 43
- Runs batted in: 290
- Stats at Baseball Reference

Teams
- Cleveland Indians (1936–1942); New York Yankees (1943, 1946); New York Giants (1950)

Career highlights and awards
- World Series champion (1943)

Cyril Roy Weatherly (February 25, 1915 – January 19, 1991), nicknamed "Stormy", was an American professional baseball player whose career extended for two decades (1934–1943; 1946–1954; 1958). The native of Tyler County, Texas, an outfielder, appeared in 811 Major League games over ten seasons for the Cleveland Indians, New York Yankees and New York Giants. Weatherly batted left-handed and threw right-handed. Despite his relatively small size — he stood 5 ft 6½ in (1.69 m) tall and weighed 173 pounds (78 kg) — he hit more than 100 home runs in minor league baseball.

As a Major Leaguer, Weatherly collected 794 hits, with 152 doubles, 44 triples, and 43 home runs. Defensively, he recorded a .975 fielding percentage playing at all three outfield positions. His finest season was 1940, when he batted .303 with career highs in runs scored, hits, doubles, triples, home runs, and runs batted in for the contending Indians, finishing eleventh in the American League Most Valuable Player voting. Traded to the Yankees after the 1942 season, he appeared in one game as a pinch hitter during the 1943 World Series, popping out in the eighth inning of Game 2 against Mort Cooper of the St. Louis Cardinals. Although the Yankees lost that game, that was the only contest they would drop as they won the Series in five games.

Weatherly missed the 1944 and 1945 seasons while serving in the United States Army during World War II.
