= Pine Forest, Texas =

- City
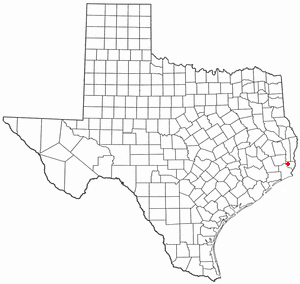
- Location of Pine Forest, Texas

- Coordinates: 30°10′32″N 94°02′12″W
- Country: United States
- State: Texas
- County: Orange

Area
  - Total: 2.83 sq mi (7.34 km^{2})
  - Land: 2.81 sq mi (7.29 km^{2})
  - Water: 0.019 sq mi (0.05 km^{2})
- Elevation: 20 ft (6.1 m)

Population (2020)
  - Total: 499
  - Density: 177/sq mi (68.4/km^{2})
- Time zone: UTC-6 (Central (CST))
  - Summer (DST): UTC-5 (CDT)
- ZIP code: 77662
- Area code: 409
- FIPS code: 48-57524
- GNIS feature ID: 2411423
- Website: cityofpineforest.com

Pine Forest is a city in Orange County, Texas, United States. The population was 499 at the 2020 census. It is part of the Beaumont–Port Arthur Metropolitan Statistical Area.

== Geography ==
According to the United States Census Bureau, the city has a total area of 2.8 square miles (7.3 km^{2}), all land.

== Demographics ==
Historical population
Census	Pop.	Note	%±
1970	512		—
1980	639		24.8%
1990	709		11.0%
2000	632		−10.9%
2010	487		−22.9%
2020	499		2.5%
U.S. Decennial Census; 2020 Census

=== 2020 census ===
As of the 2020 census, Pine Forest had a population of 499. The median age was 41.2 years. 22.0% of residents were under the age of 18 and 19.2% of residents were 65 years of age or older. For every 100 females there were 82.8 males, and for every 100 females age 18 and over there were 87.9 males age 18 and over.

0.0% of residents lived in urban areas, while 100.0% lived in rural areas.

There were 189 households in Pine Forest, of which 38.6% had children under the age of 18 living in them. Of all households, 57.7% were married-couple households, 14.8% were households with a male householder and no spouse or partner present, and 22.8% were households with a female householder and no spouse or partner present. About 18.5% of all households were made up of individuals and 11.1% had someone living alone who was 65 years of age or older.

There were 217 housing units, of which 12.9% were vacant. The homeowner vacancy rate was 0.0% and the rental vacancy rate was 32.3%.

Racial composition as of the 2020 census
Race	Number	Percent
White	454	91.0%
Black or African American	0	0.0%
American Indian and Alaska Native	1	0.2%
Asian	1	0.2%
Native Hawaiian and Other Pacific Islander	0	0.0%
Some other race	14	2.8%
Two or more races	29	5.8%
Hispanic or Latino (of any race)	45	9.0%

=== 2000 census ===
As of the 2000 census, there were 632 people, 223 households, and 177 families residing in the city. The population density was 228.3 inhabitants per square mile (88.1/km^{2}). There were 232 housing units at an average density of 83.8 per square mile (32.4/km^{2}). The racial makeup of the city was 97.63% White, 0.63% Native American, and 1.74% from two or more races. Hispanic or Latino of any race were 2.53% of the population.

There were 223 households, out of which 37.2% had children under the age of 18 living with them, 61.9% were married couples living together, 12.1% had a female householder with no husband present, and 20.2% were non-families. 17.0% of all households were made up of individuals, and 7.2% had someone living alone who was 65 years of age or older. The average household size was 2.83 and the average family size was 3.18.

In the city, the population was spread out, with 30.1% under the age of 18, 6.8% from 18 to 24, 28.0% from 25 to 44, 24.2% from 45 to 64, and 10.9% who were 65 years of age or older. The median age was 35 years. For every 100 females, there were 101.3 males. For every 100 females age 18 and over, there were 101.8 males.

The median income for a household in the city was $43,000, and the median income for a family was $46,058. Males had a median income of $36,250 versus $19,063 for females. The per capita income for the city was $18,308. About 5.2% of families and 5.8% of the population were below the poverty line, including 5.4% of those under age 18 and 8.5% of those age 65 or over.

== Education ==
The City of Pine Forest is served by the Vidor Independent School District.
