= Kountze Independent School District =

School district in Texas, United States

Address
- 160 West Vaughn Street Kountze, Texas, 77625; United States

District information
- Type: Public
- Grades: PK–12
- Schools: 5
- NCES District ID: 4825920

Students and staff
- Students: 1,143 (2023–2024)
- Teachers: 95.12 (on an FTE basis) (2023–2024)
- Staff: 119.13 (on an FTE basis) (2023–2024)
- Student–teacher ratio: 12.02 (2023–2024)

Other information
- Website: www.kountzeisd.org

Kountze Independent School District is a public school district based in Kountze, Texas (USA).

In addition to Kountze, the district serves the unincorporated community of Honey Island and part of Wildwood.

Dr. Shane Reyenga currently serves as the district's superintendent. The Board of Trustees consists of: Steve Eppes, Missy Jennings, Brandon Laird, Don McDonald, Jason McDonald, Chris Jones, and Jim McNeely.

== Schools ==
Kountze High School

Location
- 1488 Farm to Market Road 1293; Kountze, (Hardin County), Texas 77625; United States
- Coordinates: 30.353291°N 94.339020°W

Information
- Type: Public high school
- Principal: Derrick Edwards
- Staff: 34.90 (FTE)
- Enrollment: 331 (2023-24)
- Student to teacher ratio: 9.48
- Colors: Red and black
- Nickname: Lions
- Website: Kountze High School

- Kountze Elementary: Pre-K through 2nd Grade
- Kountze Intermediate: 3rd through 5th Grade
- Kountze (or Penland) Middle: 6th through 8th Grade
- Kountze High: 9th through 12th Grade
