= Kountze, Texas =

- City
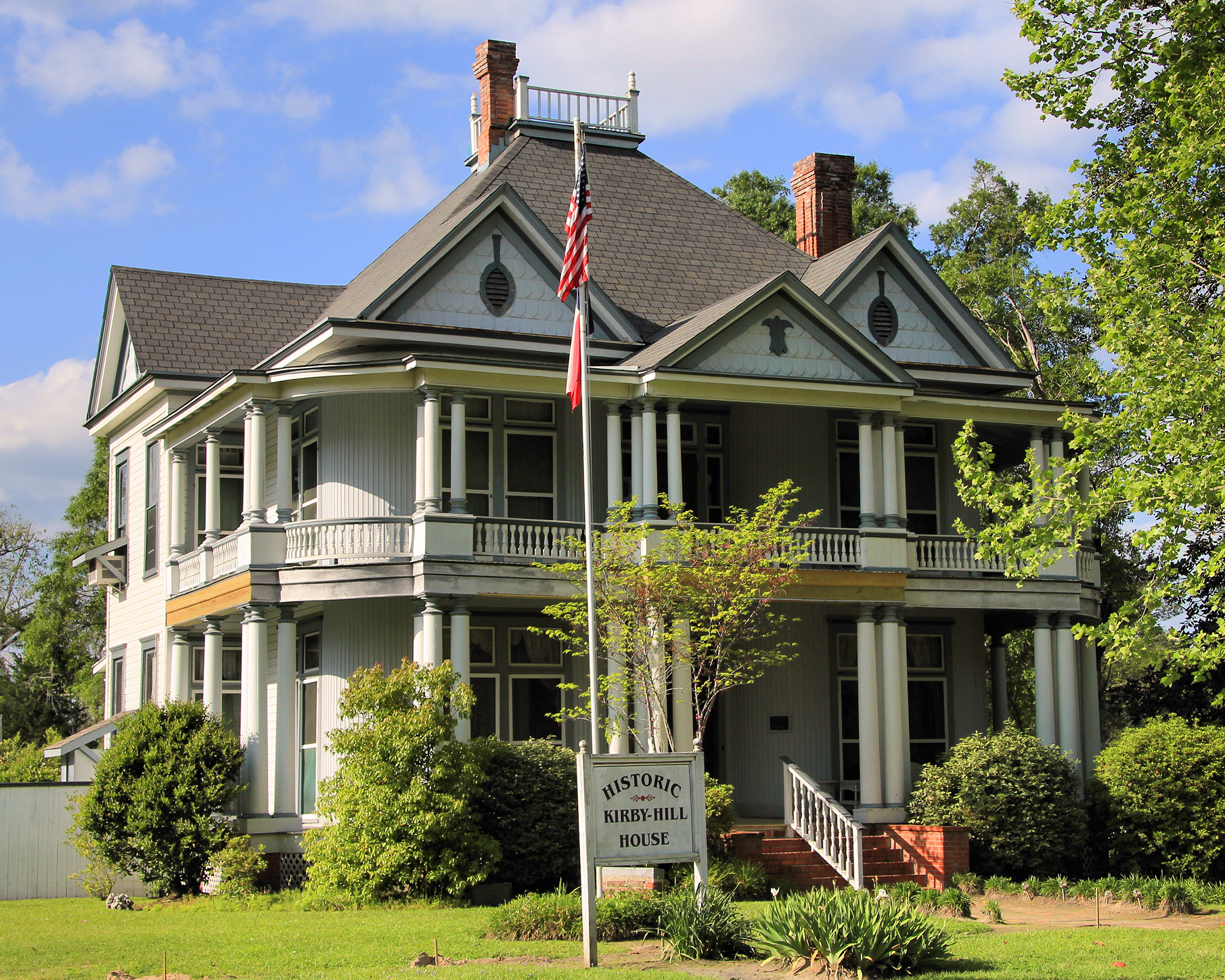
- Kirby Hill House in Kountze, Texas

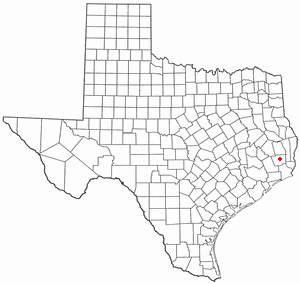
- Location of Kountze, Texas

- Coordinates: 30°22′46″N 94°19′05″W
- Country: United States
- State: Texas
- County: Hardin

Area
  - Total: 3.98 sq mi (10.32 km^{2})
  - Land: 3.98 sq mi (10.30 km^{2})
  - Water: 0.0077 sq mi (0.02 km^{2})
- Elevation: 85 ft (26 m)

Population (2020)
  - Total: 1,981
  - Density: 529.9/sq mi (204.59/km^{2})
- Time zone: UTC-6 (Central (CST))
  - Summer (DST): UTC-5 (CDT)
- ZIP code: 77625
- Area code: 409
- FIPS code: 48-39868
- GNIS feature ID: 2411558
- Website: cityofkountze.org

Kountze (/kuːnts/ koonts) is a city in and the county seat of Hardin County, Texas, United States. The population was 1,981 at the 2020 census. The city is part of the Beaumont–Port Arthur metropolitan area.

Kountze was originally established as a railroad town in 1881. The city was named for Herman and Augustus Kountze, financial backers of the Sabine and East Texas Railroad. The seat of Hardin County, Kountze boasts an area of more than 89% forested lush green terrain. The local area produces over 3.5 million board feet (8,300 m^{3}) of lumber annually.

Kountze describes itself as "The Gateway to the Big Thicket". The thicket is a vast area of tangled, often impenetrable woods, streams, and marshes that occupies a 50-mile (80 km) circle of southeastern Texas, about 25 miles (40 km) north of Beaumont. The cradle of the United States' oil industry is found in the region. Portions of the thicket are nationally protected as the Big Thicket National Preserve.

In 1991, Kountze became the first American city with a Muslim mayor, an African American named Charles Bilal.

== Sites of interest ==
The Kirby-Hill House was built in 1902 by James L. Kirby, brother of timber baron and philanthropist John Henry Kirby. James' daughter, Lucy Kirby Hill, purchased the house from her father in 1907. It is the first Hardin County home listed in the National Register of Historic Places.

The Big Thicket National Preserve was established by Congress in 1974. This combination of virgin pine and cypress forest, hardwood forest, meadow, and blackwater swamp is managed by the National Park Service. The preserve was established to protect the remnant of its complex biological diversity.

== Geography ==
Kountze is slightly northeast of the center of Hardin County, north of Cypress Creek, an east-flowing tributary of Village Creek and part of the Neches River watershed. U.S. Route 287 (Pine Street) is the main highway through the city, leading north 31 miles (50 km) to Woodville and south 25 miles (40 km) to Beaumont. Texas State Highway 326 (W. Monroe Street) leads southwest from Kountze 18 miles (29 km) to Sour Lake.

According to the U.S. Census Bureau, the city of Kountze has a total area of 4.0 square miles (10.3 km^{2}), of which 0.01 square miles (0.02 km^{2}), or 0.20%, is water.

=== Climate ===
The climate in this area is characterized by hot, humid summers and generally mild to cool winters. According to the Köppen climate classification system, Kountze has a humid subtropical climate, Cfa on climate maps.

== Demographics ==
Historical population
Census	Pop.	Note	%±
1890	295		—
1950	1,651		—
1960	1,768		7.1%
1970	2,173		22.9%
1980	2,716		25.0%
1990	2,056		−24.3%
2000	2,115		2.9%
2010	2,123		0.4%
2020	1,981		−6.7%
U.S. Decennial Census

=== 2020 census ===
As of the 2020 census, Kountze had a population of 1,981, 715 households, and 496 families residing in the city. The median age was 38.8 years. 23.6% of residents were under the age of 18 and 18.9% of residents were 65 years of age or older. For every 100 females there were 96.7 males, and for every 100 females age 18 and over there were 90.7 males age 18 and over.

0.0% of residents lived in urban areas, while 100.0% lived in rural areas.

There were 715 households in Kountze, of which 33.7% had children under the age of 18 living in them. Of all households, 45.5% were married-couple households, 15.5% were households with a male householder and no spouse or partner present, and 32.7% were households with a female householder and no spouse or partner present. About 22.9% of all households were made up of individuals and 10.6% had someone living alone who was 65 years of age or older.

There were 839 housing units, of which 14.8% were vacant. The homeowner vacancy rate was 2.1% and the rental vacancy rate was 11.1%.

Racial composition as of the 2020 census
Race	Number	Percent
White	1,363	68.8%
Black or African American	443	22.4%
American Indian and Alaska Native	6	0.3%
Asian	19	1.0%
Native Hawaiian and Other Pacific Islander	1	0.1%
Some other race	56	2.8%
Two or more races	93	4.7%
Hispanic or Latino (of any race)	106	5.4%

=== 2010 census ===
As of the 2010 census, Kountze had a population of 2,123. The ethnic and racial makeup of the population was 70.1% non-Hispanic White, 23.1% African American, 0.2% Native American, 0.3% Asian Indian, 0.4% Filipino, 0.1% other Asian, 1.3% some other race, and 2.2% reporting two or more races, including 5.0% Hispanic.

=== 2000 census ===
As of the census of 2000, 2,115 people, 747 households, and 537 families resided in the city. The population density was 532.7 inhabitants per square mile (205.7/km^{2}). The 897 housing units averaged 225.9 per square mile (87.2/km^{2}). The racial makeup of the city was 70.59% White, 26.43% African American, 0.66% Native American, 0.43% Asian, 0.09% Pacific Islander, 0.71% from other races, and 1.09% from two or more races. Hispanics or Latinos of any race were 2.84% of the population.

Of the 747 households, 36.3% had children under the age of 18 living with them, 50.9% were married couples living together, 15.9% had a female householder with no husband present, and 28.0% were not families; 25.8% of all households were made up of individuals, and 11.1% had someone living alone who was 65 years of age or older. The average household size was 2.67 and the average family size was 3.20.

In the city, the population was distributed as 29.1% under the age of 18, 8.9% from 18 to 24, 28.6% from 25 to 44, 20.7% from 45 to 64, and 12.7% who were 65 years of age or older. The median age was 34 years. For every 100 females, there were 96.2 males. For every 100 females age 18 and over, there were 91.7 males.

The median income for a household in the city was $28,352, and for a family was $34,318. Males had a median income of $30,656 versus $22,083 for females. The per capita income for the city was $13,522. About 19.0% of families and 21.0% of the population were below the poverty line, including 29.8% of those under age 18 and 24.9% of those age 65 or over.

== Education ==
The city is served by the Kountze Independent School District.

The Kountze Lions' varsity basketball team has won state titles in 1970, 2004, 2005, 2007, and 2025 in both 2A and 3A of UIL standings. The Kountze Lionette's varsity basketball team has also made four appearances at the Frank Erwin Center at the University of Texas at Austin. The Kountze volleyball team has also brought home several state championship titles, as well as advanced to the final four several times.

== Notable people ==
- Grayland Arnold, Free Safety for the Houston Texans
- Geater Davis, soul singer
