= Village Mills, Texas =

Unincorporated community in Texas, US

Coordinates: 30°29′38″N 94°23′51″W

Village Mills is an unincorporated community in north central Hardin County, Texas, United States. It is part of the Beaumont–Port Arthur Metropolitan Statistical Area.

The Warren Independent School District serves area students.

== Historical development ==
This town was known on some maps as "Village" or "Village Station", with the name coming from nearby Village Creek. In late 1881, the Sabine and East Texas Railroad reached the area for the lumber trade to ship its products. The Long Manufacturing Company of Beaumont purchased 40,000 acres (160 km^{2}) of timberland and built a sawmill at the site. The Texas Tram and Lumber Company of Beaumont purchased this mill in 1883, the majority stockholder being William A. Fletcher. The post office was established this same year. By 1889, this sawmill was churning out 75,000 board feet of lumber daily. At this time, this mill consisted of two sections of town, one of which was the mill operations (called Long Station), the other being Village Mills 1 mi (2 km) away, which contained the housing. One day in 1895, this mill broke a world record by sawing over 250,000 board feet in 11 hours.

In 1902, lumber baron and businessman John Henry Kirby purchased the mill, and dubbed it "Mill L", an asset of the Kirby Lumber Company. As of 1907, the annual production of lumber was almost 17 million board feet. The mill closed in the early 1930s, which caused Village Mills' population to drop from 300 down to 80 within the next decade. In 1945, the discovery of natural gas and oil deposits boosted the local economy. Over the next quarter-century, over 31 wells were drilled, with 17 of these still operating into the 1980s.
