= Honey Island, Texas =

Unincorporated community in Texas, US

Coordinates: 30°23′44″N 94°26′27″W

Honey Island is an unincorporated community in Hardin County, Texas, United States. It is part of the Beaumont–Port Arthur Metropolitan Statistical Area. The Kountze Independent School District provides public schools for area students.

Though not usually an island, it is located on elevated land between the Cypress and Flat Cypress creeks, which rise in heavy rain, thereby temporarily isolating the area as an island.

== Historical development ==
During the time of the Civil War, this site was known to attract Jayhawkers due to the area's numerous beehives. In addition to using the honey as food source, they would often stash honey in hidden pots that local sympathizers would exchange for supplies. This activity would eventually lead to the Kaiser Burnout by the Confederates in the nearby cane fields.

In 1901 the Gulf, Colorado and Santa Fe Railway reached the site, and by 1907 a post office was established. The local sawmill was sold several times until it came into ownership of the Kirby Lumber Company, owned by John Henry Kirby. The mill closed during the Great Depression, but it reopened, to run until its final closing in 1955.

== Population ==
According to the 1950 census, the community had 1,250 inhabitants. By the 1990 census, its population was reported to have declined to 400. As of the 2000 census, its population had remained essentially stable at 401.
