= Warren, Tyler County, Texas =

Census-designated place in Tyler County, Texas, United States

Warren
- Census-designated place
- Location within the state of Texas Warren (the United States)
- Coordinates: 30°37′16″N 94°24′38″W
- Country: United States
- State: Texas
- County: Tyler

Area
  - Total: 4.2 sq mi (10.9 km^{2})
  - Land: 4.2 sq mi (10.9 km^{2})
  - Water: 0 sq mi (0.0 km^{2})
- Elevation: 161 ft (49 m)

Population (2010)
  - Total: 757
  - Density: 180/sq mi (69.4/km^{2})
- Time zone: UTC-6 (Central (CST))
  - Summer (DST): UTC-5 (CDT)
- ZIP codes: 77664
- GNIS feature ID: 2587000

Warren is a census-designated place and unincorporated community in Tyler County, Texas, United States. Its ZIP code is 77664. This was a new CDP for the 2010 census, with a population of 757.

== Geography ==
The CDP has a total area of 4.2 square miles (11 km^{2}), all land.

== Demographics ==
Historical population
Census	Pop.	Note	%±
2010	757		—
2020	677		−10.6%
U.S. Decennial Census; 1850–1900 1910; 1920 1930 1940; 1950 1960 1970; 1980 1990 2000; 2010 2020

Warren first appeared as a census designated place in the 2010 U.S. census.

=== 2020 census ===
Warren CDP, Texas – Racial and ethnic composition Note: the US Census treats Hispanic/Latino as an ethnic category. This table excludes Latinos from the racial categories and assigns them to a separate category. Hispanics/Latinos may be of any race.
Race / Ethnicity (NH = Non-Hispanic)	Pop 2010	Pop 2020	% 2010	% 2020
White alone (NH)	725	623	95.77%	92.02%
Black or African American alone (NH)	12	2	1.59%	0.30%
Native American or Alaska Native alone (NH)	8	6	1.06%	0.89%
Asian alone (NH)	0	0	0.00%	0.00%
Native Hawaiian or Pacific Islander alone (NH)	0	0	0.00%	0.00%
Other race alone (NH)	0	6	0.00%	0.89%
Mixed race or Multiracial (NH)	6	33	0.79%	4.87%
Hispanic or Latino (any race)	6	7	0.79%	1.03%
Total	757	677	100.00%	100.00%

== Education ==
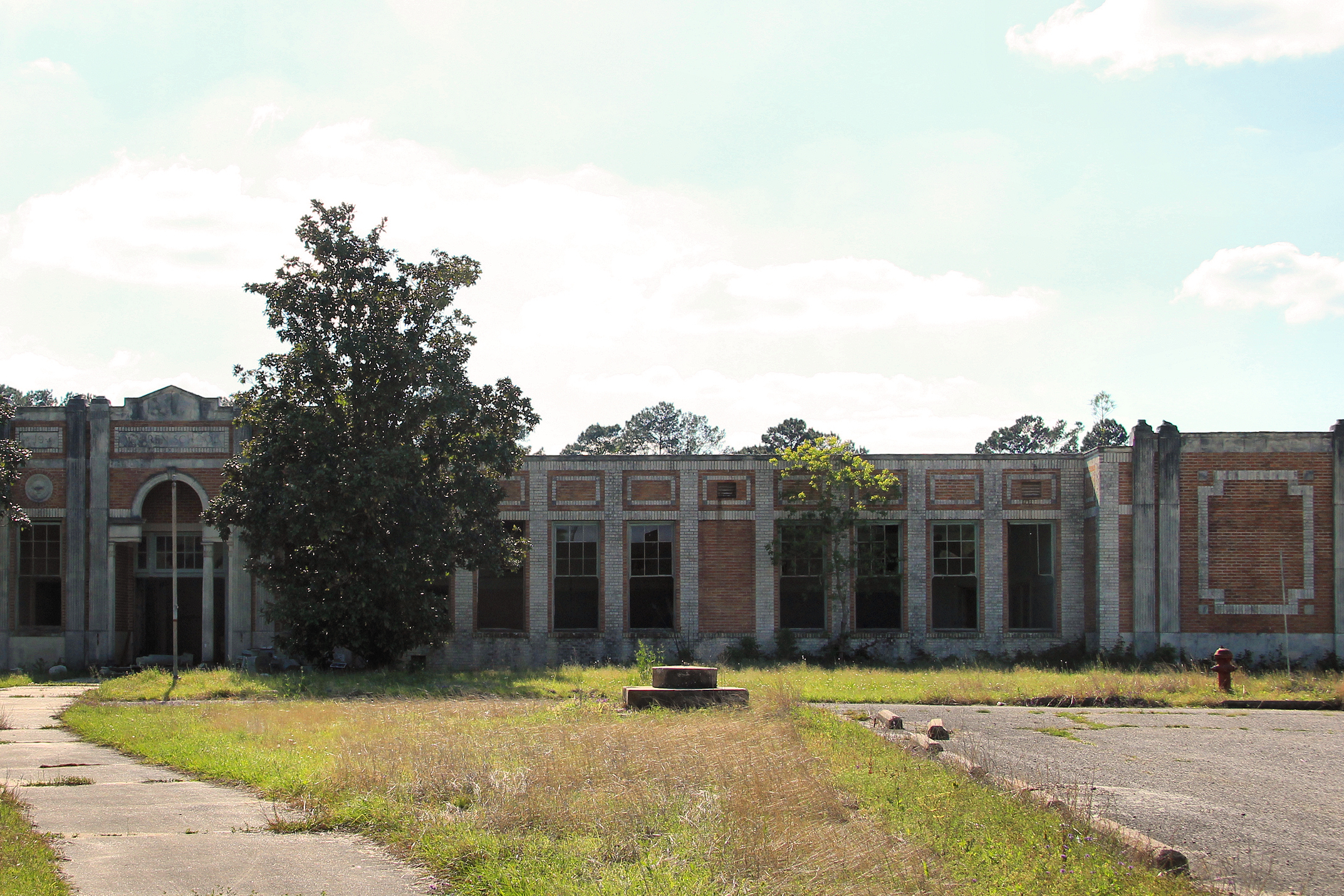
Old Warren School, which is listed on the National Register of Historic Places, April 2014

The Warren Independent School District serves area students.

== Notable people ==
- John Elliott, professional football player for NY Jets
- Grady Hatton, baseball player and manager.
- Roy Weatherly, baseball player

== See also ==
- List of census-designated places in Texas
