= Sour Lake, Texas =

- City
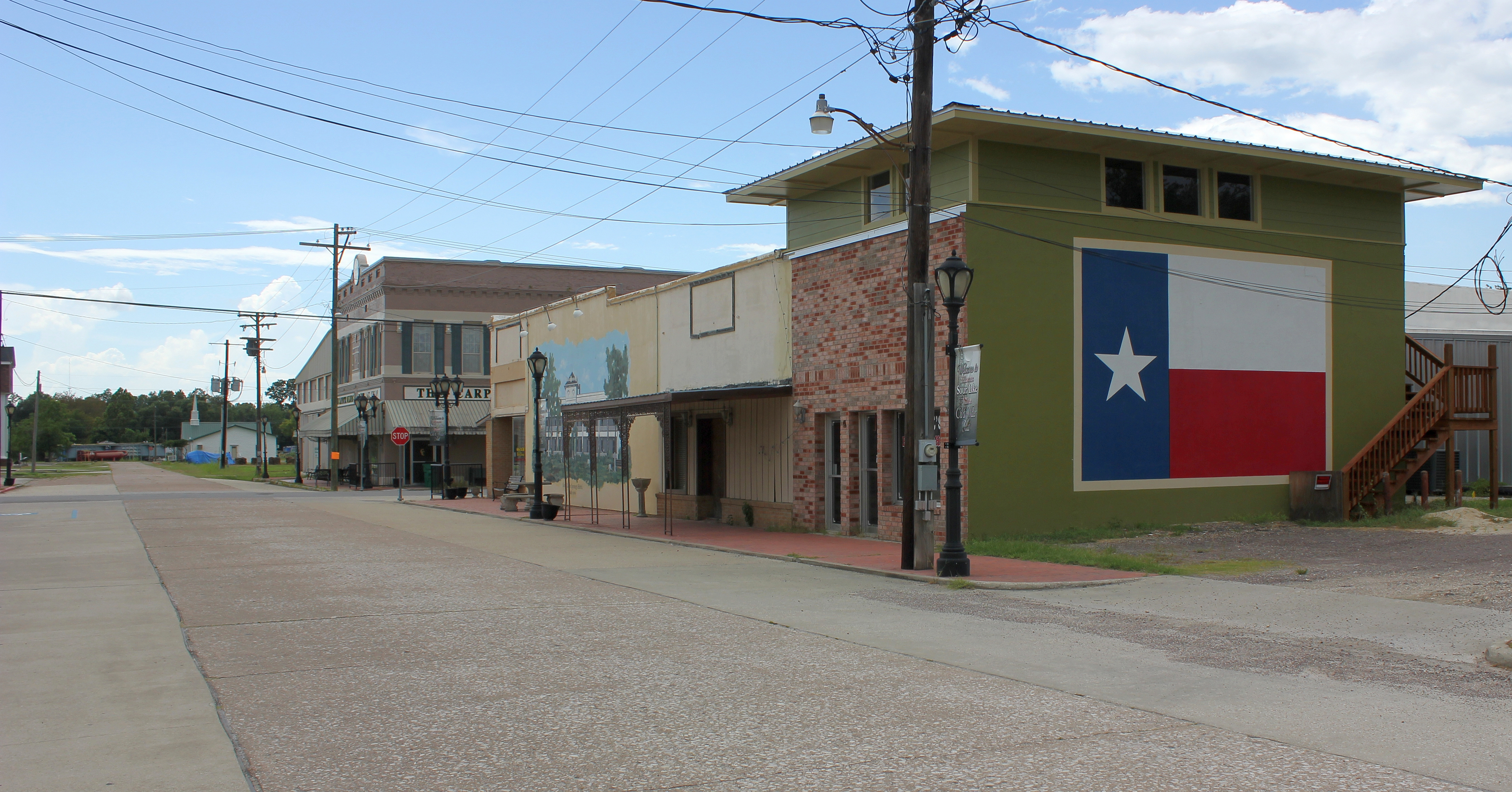
- Sour Lake historic district

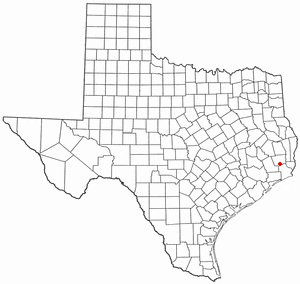
- Location of Sour Lake, Texas

- Coordinates: 30°07′55″N 94°24′12″W
- Country: United States
- State: Texas
- County: Hardin

Area
  - Total: 2.34 sq mi (6.07 km^{2})
  - Land: 2.30 sq mi (5.96 km^{2})
  - Water: 0.042 sq mi (0.11 km^{2})
- Elevation: 46 ft (14 m)

Population (2020)
  - Total: 1,773
  - Density: 836/sq mi (322.7/km^{2})
- Time zone: UTC-6 (Central (CST))
  - Summer (DST): UTC-5 (CDT)
- ZIP code: 77659
- Area code: 409
- FIPS code: 48-68828
- GNIS feature ID: 2411932
- Website: cityofsourlake.com

Sour Lake is a city in Hardin County, Texas, United States. The population was 1,773 at the 2020 census. It was originally named "Sour Lake Springs", after the sulphurous spring water that flowed into the nearby lake. The city is part of the Beaumont–Port Arthur Metropolitan Statistical Area. Sour Lake is the oldest surviving town in Hardin County. It is called by some the "Gateway to the Big Thicket".

== History ==
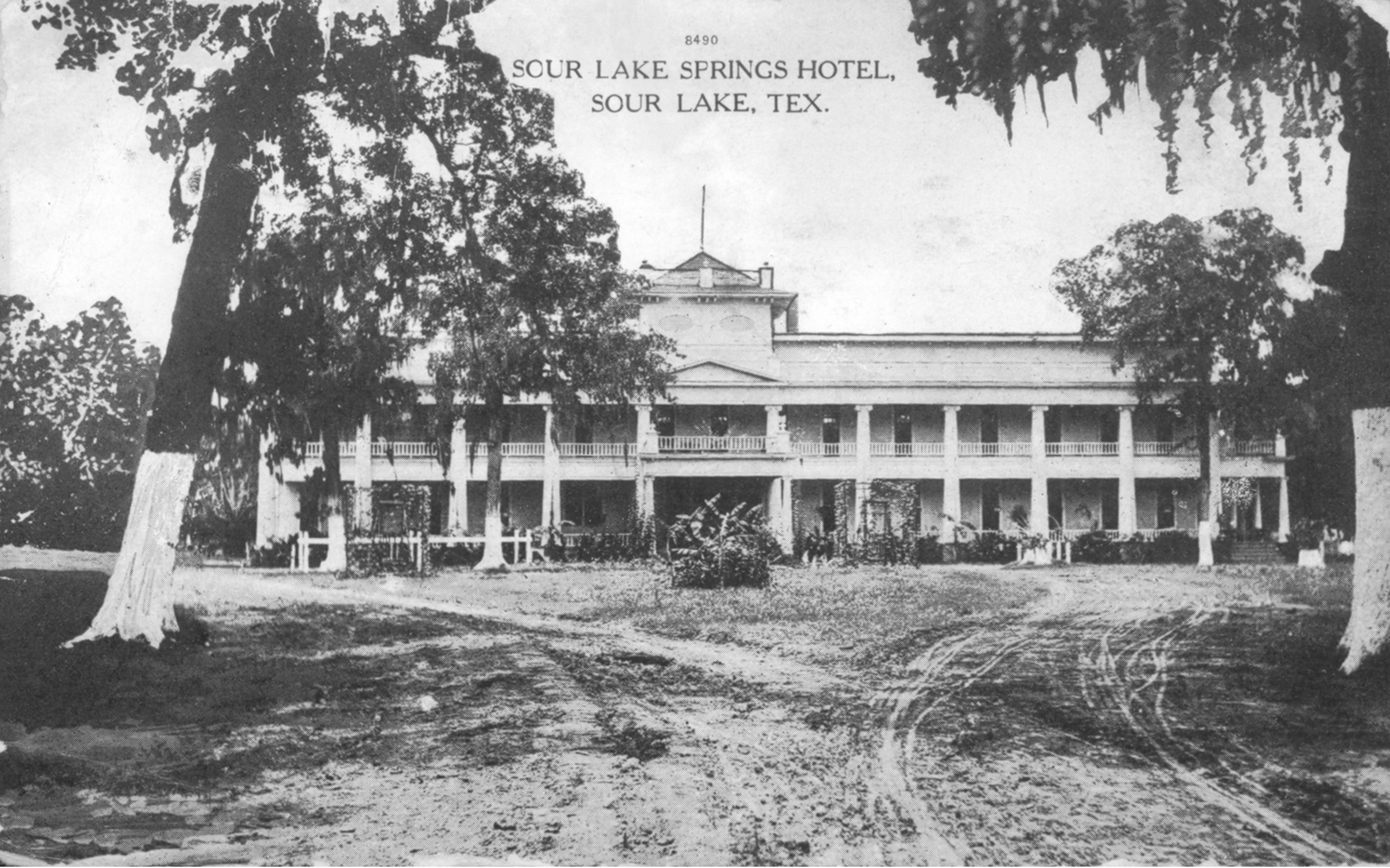
Postcard of Sour Lake Spring Hotel, undated

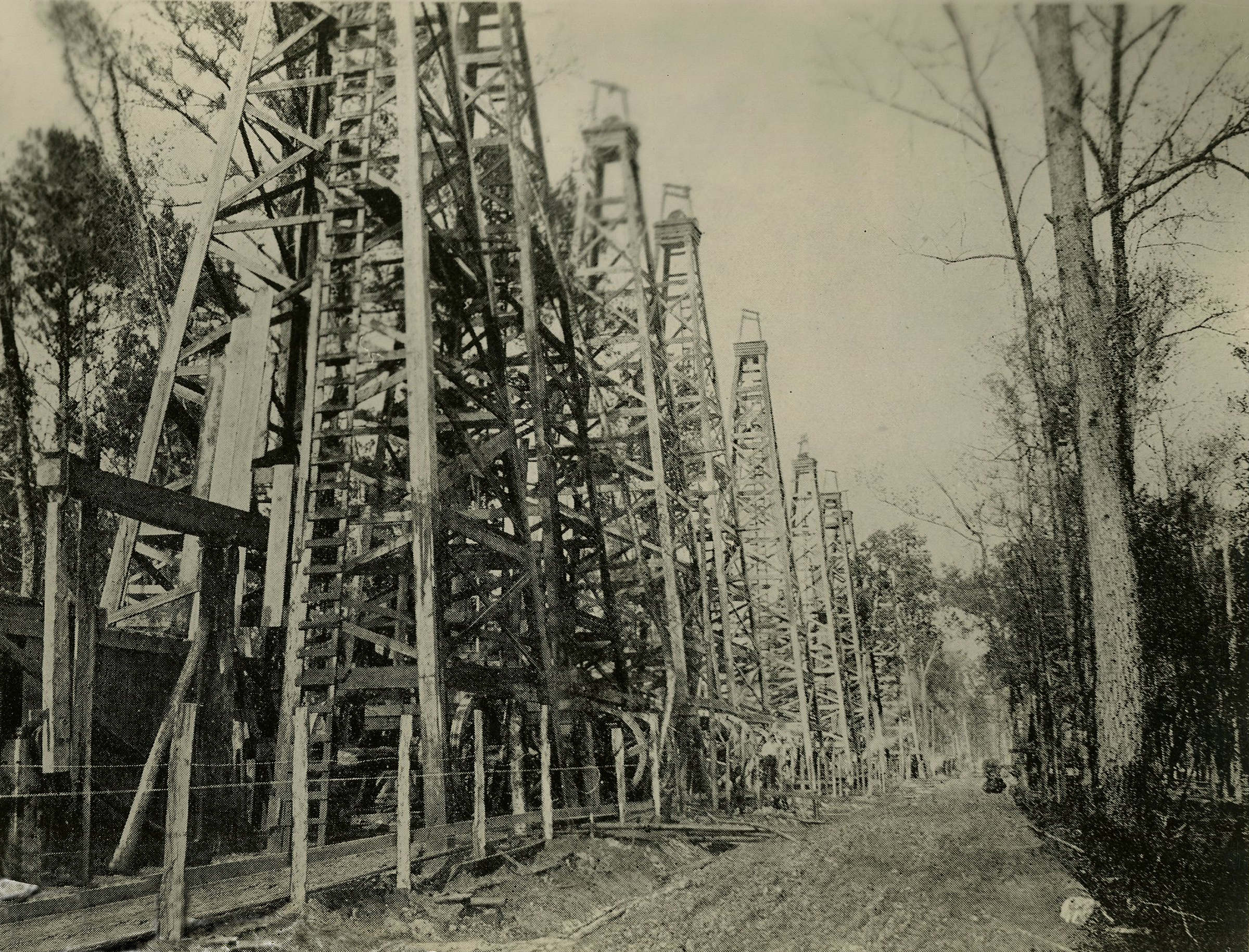
Oil derricks at Sour Lake, c. 1910

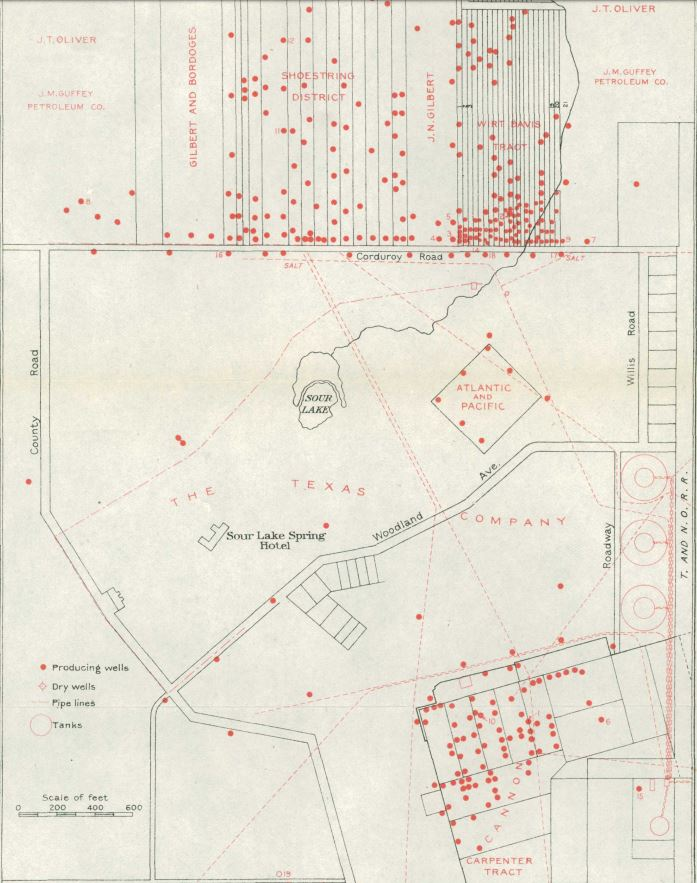
Sour Lake oil leases

Sour Lake was first settled around 1835 when the Mexican state of Coahuila y Tejas granted Stephen Jackson one league of land covering 4,428 acres (17.92 km^{2}) by land grant. Sam Houston visited Sour Lake in his later years. The town is home to one of the biggest sinkholes in Texas.

Sour Lake became a short-lived boomtown with the discovery of oil in 1901, shortly after oil was found at the nearby Spindletop salt dome. It is known as the birthplace of Texaco. Formed in 1903, the Texas Company (Texaco's former corporate name) is one of the three major oil companies that can trace its origins to the oil fields around Southeast Texas. The Sour Lake oilfield produced about 90,000,000 barrels (14,000,000 m^{3}) of oil up to 1948, when it was producing about 3,500 barrels (560 m^{3}) daily and new drilling was still underway. Today the Sour Lake oilfield is the oldest continuously producing oil field in the world.

The town of Atcheson in Bruce McCandless's 2012 novel Sour Lake appears to be based at least loosely on the real Sour Lake. Atcheson, like the real-life Sour Lake, is situated in the Big Thicket and experienced a short-lived oil boom in early years of the 20th century. Yvette Benavides, in a San Antonio Express-News review of the book, noted, "There is a lot that is historically factual in this novel. That's part of the fun of reading Sour Lake."

The Ecuadorian jungle town commonly referred to as Lago Agrio was named after Sour Lake by Texaco when the company established the oil-producing settlement. Lago Agrio is Spanish for "Sour Lake". The official name of the Ecuadorian town is Nueva Loja.

== Geography ==
Sour Lake is in southern Hardin County at the intersection of state highways 105 and 326. Highway 105 leads west 46 miles (74 km) to Cleveland, and east 14 miles (23 km) to the US 69 freeway in the northern part of Beaumont. Highway 326 leads north 18 miles (29 km) to Kountze, the Hardin county seat, and south 7 miles (11 km) to U.S. Route 90 at Nome.

According to the United States Census Bureau, the city of Sour Lake has a total area of 2.0 square miles (5.3 km^{2}), of which 0.02 square miles (0.06 km^{2}), or 1.21%, are water.

== Demographics ==
Historical population
Census	Pop.	Note	%±
1940	1,504		—
1950	1,630		8.4%
1960	1,602		−1.7%
1970	1,694		5.7%
1980	1,807		6.7%
1990	1,547		−14.4%
2000	1,667		7.8%
2010	1,813		8.8%
2020	1,773		−2.2%
U.S. Decennial Census

=== 2020 census ===
As of the 2020 census, Sour Lake had a population of 1,773, with 720 households and 620 families residing in the city. The median age was 38.9 years; 23.4% of residents were under the age of 18 and 18.3% of residents were 65 years of age or older. For every 100 females there were 89.2 males, and for every 100 females age 18 and over there were 86.4 males age 18 and over.

0.0% of residents lived in urban areas, while 100.0% lived in rural areas.

There were 720 households in Sour Lake, of which 35.1% had children under the age of 18 living in them. Of all households, 46.1% were married-couple households, 18.1% were households with a male householder and no spouse or partner present, and 30.0% were households with a female householder and no spouse or partner present. About 28.2% of all households were made up of individuals and 14.5% had someone living alone who was 65 years of age or older. There were 810 housing units, of which 11.1% were vacant. The homeowner vacancy rate was 3.3% and the rental vacancy rate was 10.7%.

Racial composition as of the 2020 census
Race	Number	Percent
White	1,519	85.7%
Black or African American	45	2.5%
American Indian and Alaska Native	7	0.4%
Asian	27	1.5%
Native Hawaiian and Other Pacific Islander	4	0.2%
Some other race	29	1.6%
Two or more races	142	8.0%
Hispanic or Latino (of any race)	125	7.1%

=== 2000 census ===
As of the census of 2000, there were 1,667 people, 672 households, and 446 families residing in the city. The population density was 964.0 inhabitants per square mile (372.2/km^{2}). There were 752 housing units at an average density of 434.9 per square mile (167.9/km^{2}). The racial makeup of the city was 94.36% White, 3.18% African American, 0.36% Native American, 0.42% Asian, 0.42% from other races, and 1.26% from two or more races. Hispanic or Latino of any race were 3.00% of the population.

There were 672 households, out of which 31.4% had children under the age of 18 living with them, 52.8% were married couples living together, 9.7% had a female householder with no husband present, and 33.6% were non-families. 31.4% of all households were made up of individuals, and 17.9% had someone living alone who was 65 years of age or older. The average household size was 2.48 and the average family size was 3.15.

In the city, the population was spread out, with 27.5% under the age of 18, 6.8% from 18 to 24, 27.4% from 25 to 44, 21.9% from 45 to 64, and 16.5% who were 65 years of age or older. The median age was 38 years. For every 100 females, there were 92.7 males. For every 100 females age 18 and over, there were 88.0 males.

The median income for a household in the city was $30,300, and the median income for a family was $39,605. Males had a median income of $36,406 versus $24,500 for females. The per capita income for the city was $15,497. About 8.5% of families and 12.7% of the population were below the poverty line, including 14.1% of those under age 18 and 15.6% of those age 65 or over.

== Education ==
Sour Lake is served by the Hardin-Jefferson Independent School District.
