= Light of Saratoga =

Supernatural lights that appear in Eastern Texas

The Light of Saratoga is a legend located in the Big Thicket of Southeast Texas. This legend of a mysterious light is also known as the Ghost Road of Saratoga, the Saratoga Light, and Bragg Light by local residents. Located on a dirt road, it is a light that may appear and disappear at random during the dark of night without explanation.

== Witness observations ==
There are different beliefs as far as what the ghostly light could be, such as swamp gas and similar natural occurrences. The most popular story surrounding this legend is that a railroad worker was decapitated in a railway accident, and the light is that of his lantern as his ghost searches endlessly for his head.

Two similar phenomena are the Paulding Light in Michigan's Upper Peninsula just north of Watersmeet and the Maco light in south-eastern North Carolina. Coincidentally, the same story of a headless railroad conductor also is offered as the explanation for these mysterious lights.

== Geography ==
Located in Texas between Beaumont and Livingston, approximately 16 miles (26 km) west of Kountze, Texas. The dirt road runs north–south starting at the south end at a bend on Farm-to-Market Road 787 that is 1.7 miles (2.7 km) north of the intersection of FM 787-770, near Saratoga and ending at the north end at Farm-to-Market Road 1293 near the ghost town of Bragg Station. The cause of the light has not been established but one common explanation is that the light is the result of car lights from a nearby highway, however the light is usually seen when facing north and the highway can only be seen while facing south.

== History ==
In 1902, Gulf, Colorado and Santa Fe Railway hacked a survey line from Bragg to Saratoga, bought right-of-way and opened the Big Thicket forest with a railroad, and the Saratoga train began its daily trips to Beaumont, carrying people, cattle, oil and logs. When the area's oil booms and virgin pine gave out, road crews pulled up the rails in 1934, the right-of-way was purchased by the county and the tram road became a county road.

== City and villages ==
- Kountze, Texas
- Bragg, Texas (ghost town)

== See also ==
- Ghost light

== Gallery ==
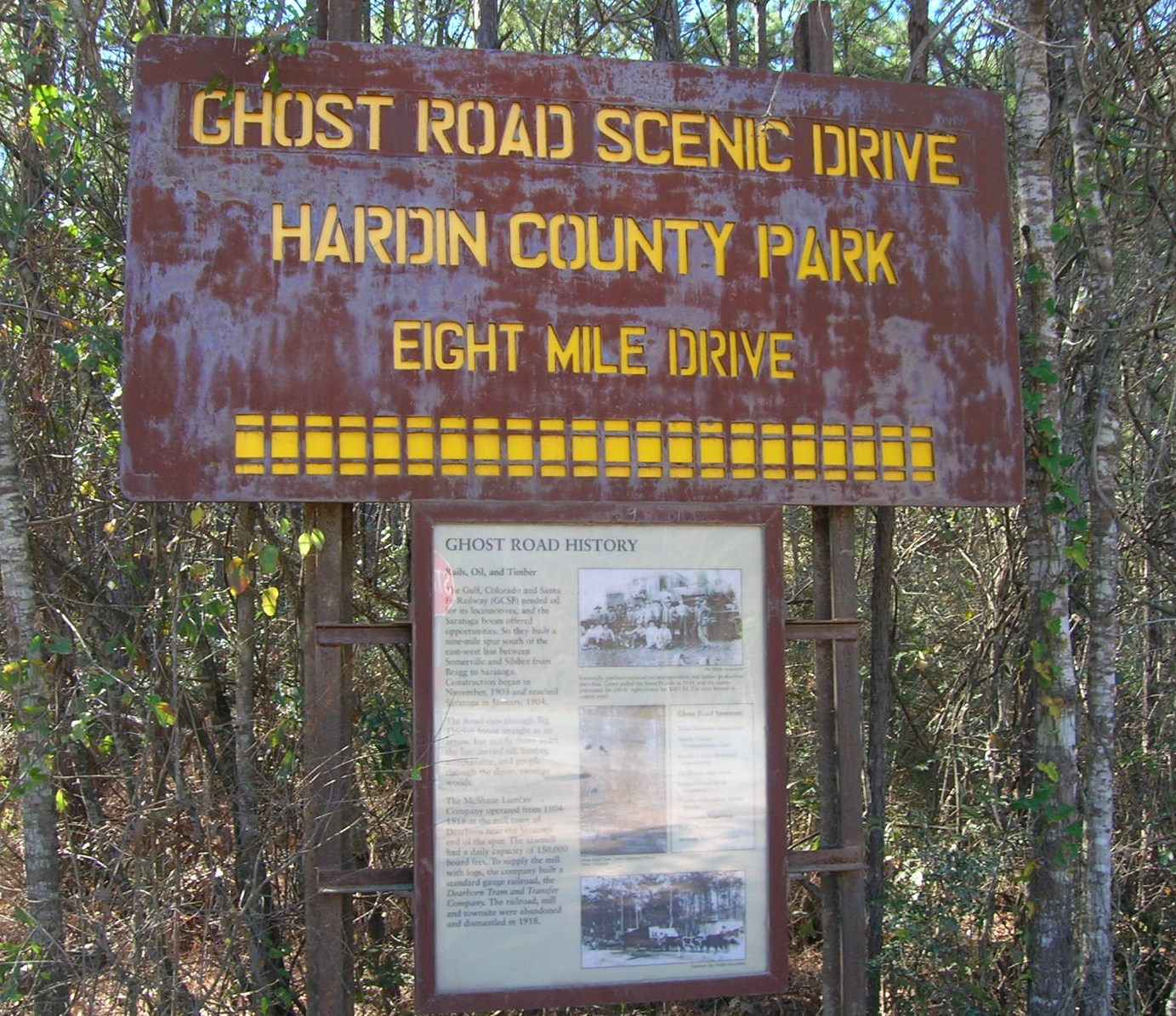
Entrance of the "Ghost Road" of Hardin County TX

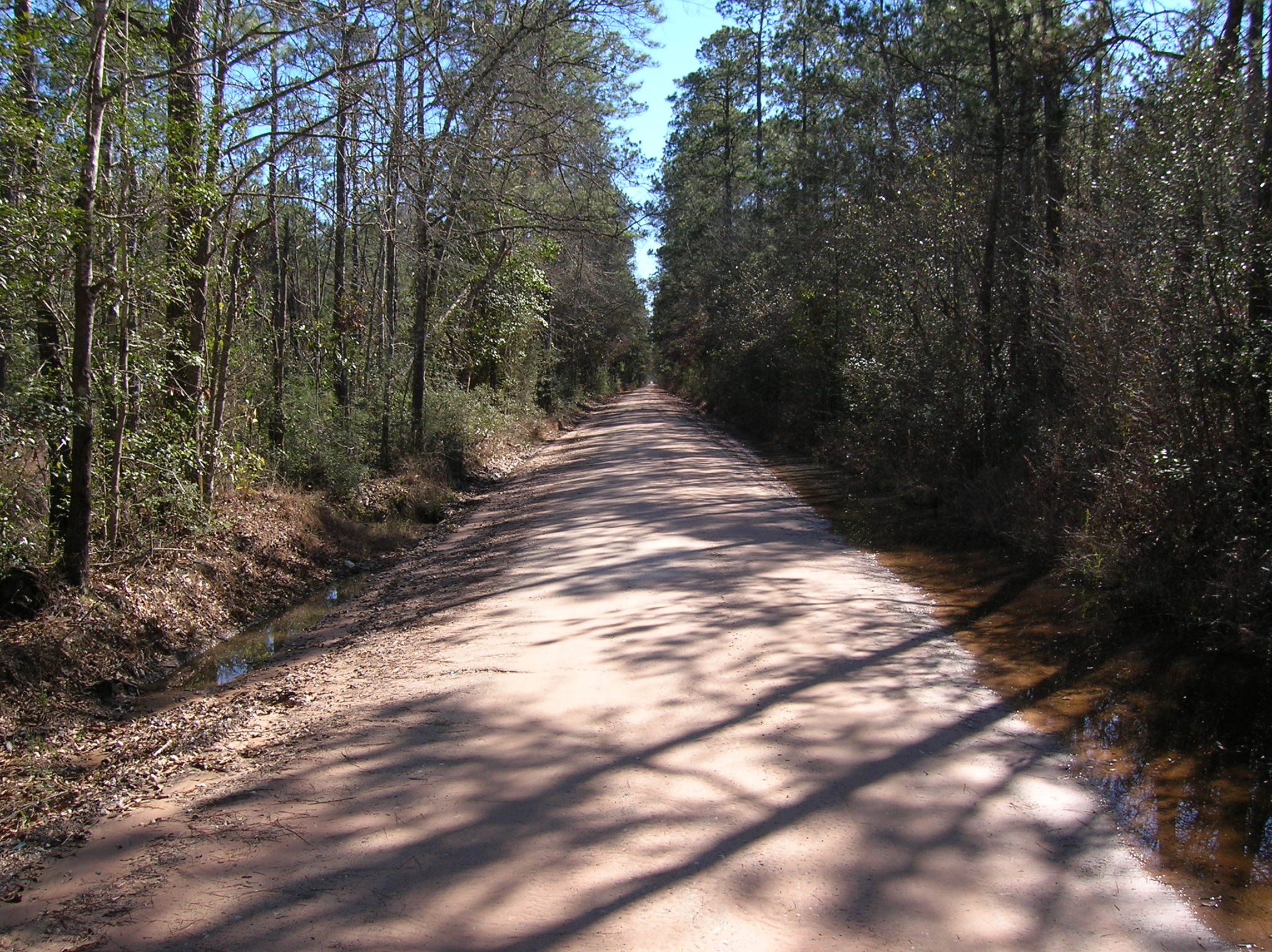
Bragg Road of Hardin County, Texas (looking south)

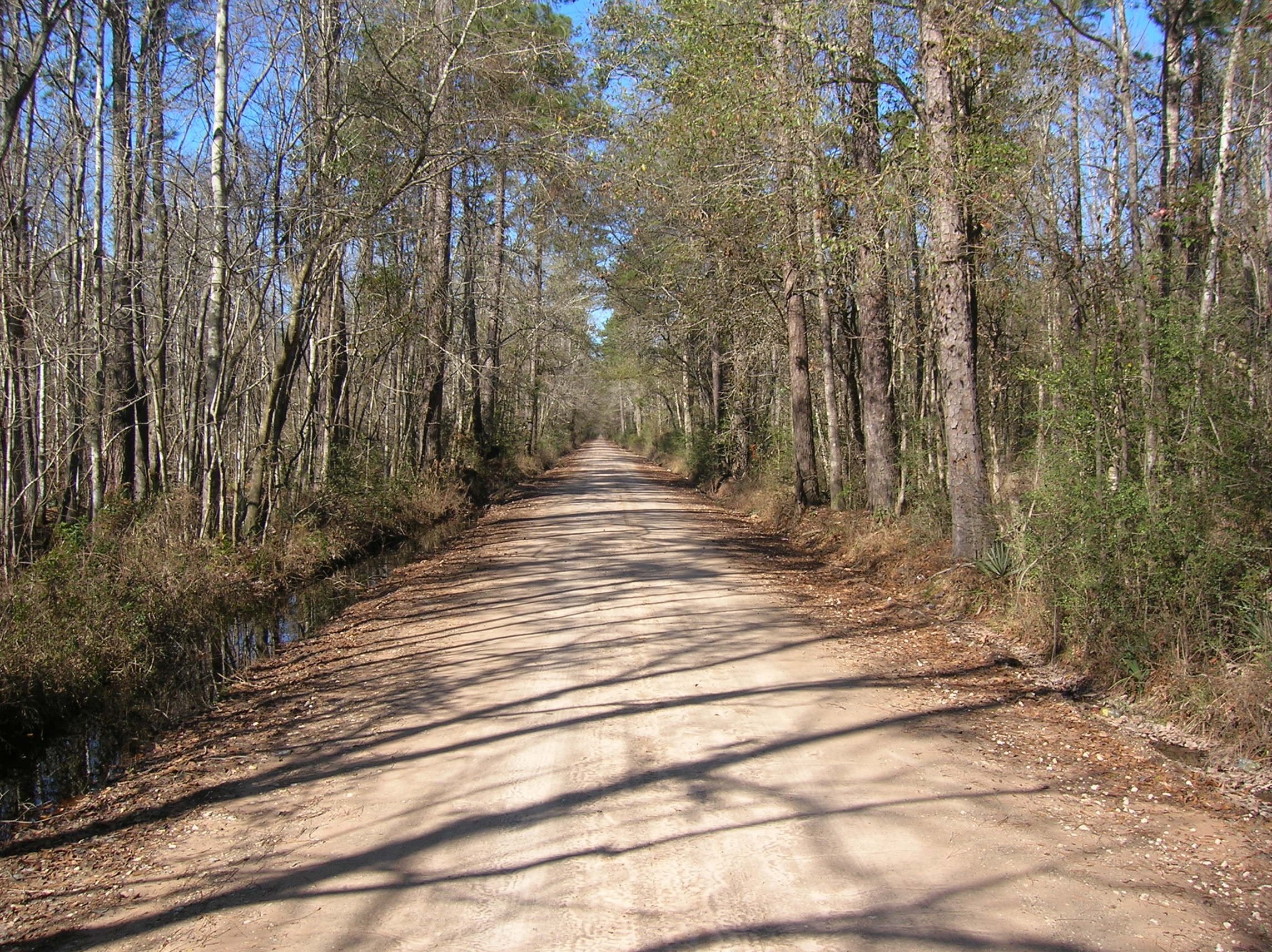
Bragg Road of Hardin County, Texas (looking north)

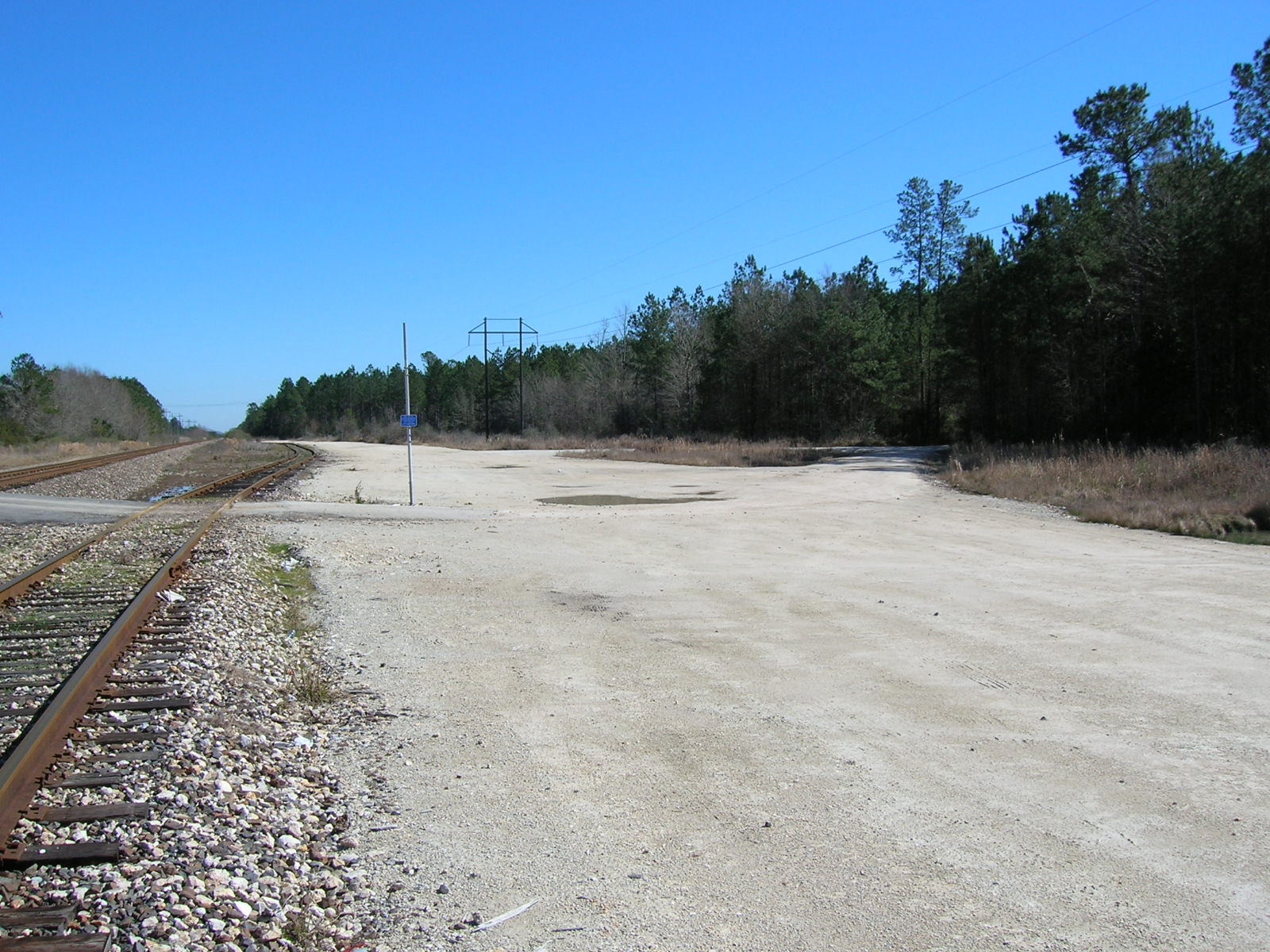
Bragg Station, Texas where GCSF railroad used to run south to Saratoga.
