= National Register of Historic Places listings in Hardin County, Texas =

Location of Hardin County in Texas

This is a list of the National Register of Historic Places listings in Hardin County, Texas.

This is intended to be a complete list of properties listed on the National Register of Historic Places in Hardin County, Texas. There are three properties listed on the National Register in the county. One property is also a Recorded Texas Historic Landmark.

This National Park Service list is complete through NPS recent listings posted June 26, 2026.

== Current listings ==
The locations of National Register properties may be seen in a mapping service provided.

	Name on the Register	Image	Date listed	Location	City or town	Description
1	Ada Belle Oil Well		January 20, 1980 (#80004126)	N of Batson; 30°15′49″N 94°36′57″W	Batson	
2	Kirby-Hill House	Kirby-Hill House	May 20, 1999 (#99000610)	210 Main St. 30°22′12″N 94°18′55″W	Kountze	Recorded Texas Historic Landmark
3	Sour Lake Downtown Historic District		June 29, 2026 (#100012692)	Three blocks in downtown Sour Lake centered around Sixth Street and S. Merchant Street; 30°08′27″N 94°24′48″W	Sour Lake	

== See also ==
- National Register of Historic Places listings in Texas
- Recorded Texas Historic Landmarks in Hardin County
