= West Hardin County Consolidated Independent School District =

School district in Texas, United States

Address
- 39227 Highway 105 Saratoga, Texas, 77585; United States

District information
- Type: Public
- Grades: PK–12
- Schools: 3
- NCES District ID: 4845000

Students and staff
- Students: 541 (2023–2024)
- Teachers: 43.67 (on an FTE basis) (2023–2024)
- Staff: 50.68 (on an FTE basis) (2023–2024)
- Student–teacher ratio: 12.39 (2023–2024)

Other information
- Website: www.westhardin.org

West Hardin County Consolidated Independent School District is a public school district based in the community of Saratoga, Texas, United States. In addition to Saratoga, the district serves the cities of Batson, Thicket, and Votaw, as well as the unincorporated communities of Hoop and Holler and Outlaw Bend.

In 2009, the school district was rated "academically acceptable" by the Texas Education Agency.

== History ==
The district was formed in the early 1960s as a part of the merger between the Saratoga Independent School District (formed 1919) and the Batson Independent School District, which was met with legal opposition after the vote to consolidate that was held in January 1961 was contested later that year; a drawn-out legal battle ensued, in which the role of the county attorney was contested, as well as an attempt to bring attention to alleged discrepancies in vote counts.

== Schools ==
- West Hardin Secondary (grades 7-12)
- West Hardin Elementary (prekindergarten-grade 6)
