= Hardin County, Texas =

County in Texas, United States

- County
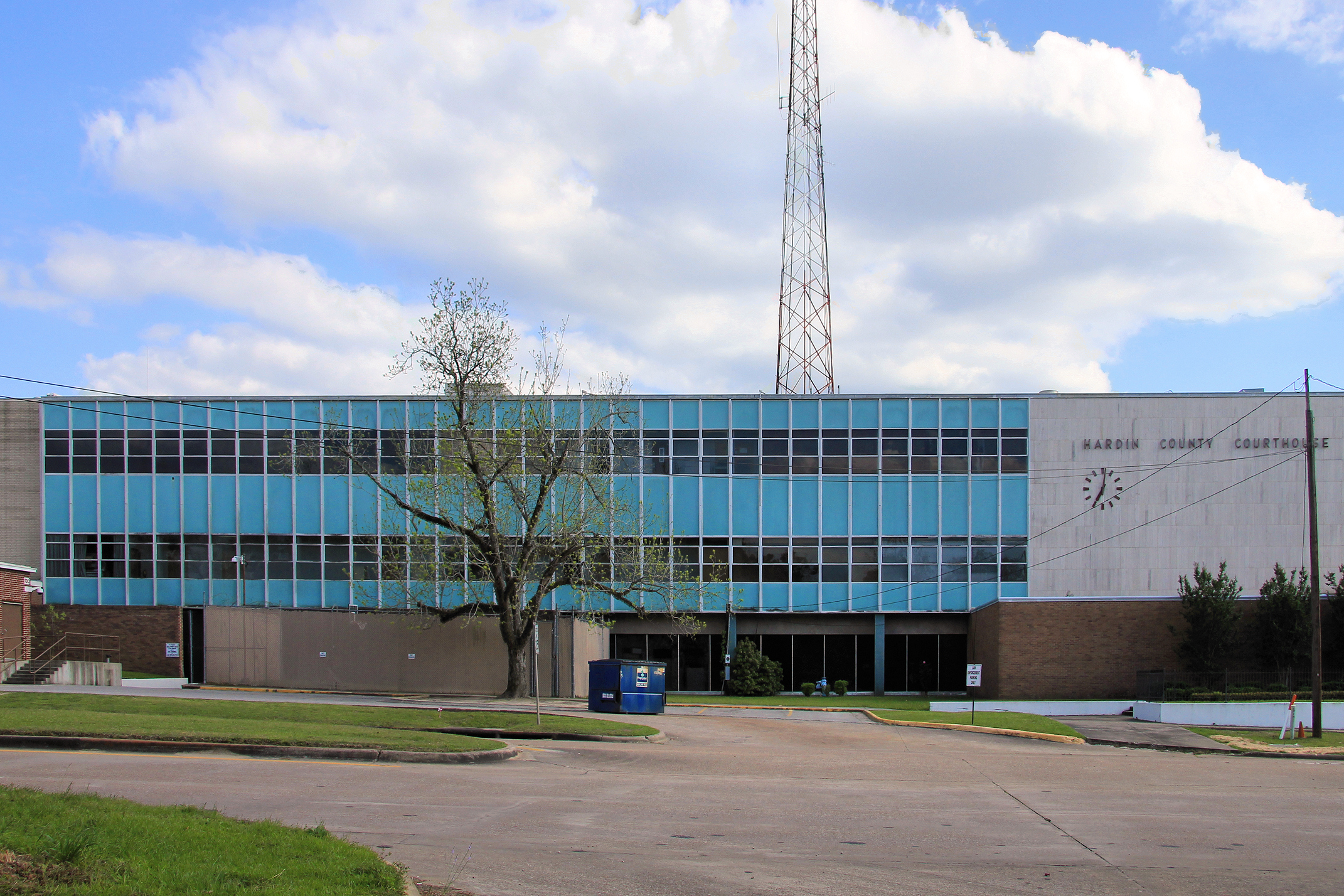
- The Hardin County Courthouse in Kountze

- Location within the U.S. state of Texas
- Coordinates: 30°20′N 94°23′W
- Country: United States
- State: Texas
- Founded: 1858
- Seat: Kountze
- Largest city: Lumberton

Area
  - Total: 898 sq mi (2,330 km^{2})
  - Land: 891 sq mi (2,310 km^{2})
  - Water: 7.0 sq mi (18 km^{2}) 0.%

Population (2020)
  - Total: 56,231
  - Estimate (2025): 58,723 ▲
  - Density: 63.1/sq mi (24.4/km^{2})
- Time zone: UTC−6 (Central)
  - Summer (DST): UTC−5 (CDT)
- Congressional district: 36th
- Website: www.co.hardin.tx.us

Hardin County is a county located in the U.S. state of Texas, United States. As of the 2020 census, its population was 56,231. The county seat is Kountze. The county is named for the family of William Hardin from Liberty County, Texas.

Hardin County is part of the Beaumont-Port Arthur metropolitan statistical area.

== History ==
The county is named for the family of William Hardin, a settler, judge, and postmaster. The Hardin family cemetery is located north of Liberty.

The current Hardin County Courthouse was built in 1959. It is at least the third courthouse to serve Hardin County.

== Geography ==
According to the U.S. Census Bureau, the county has a total area of 898 square miles (2,330 km^{2}), of which 7.0 square miles (18 km^{2}) (0.8%) are covered by water.

Hardin County is located on the flat coastal plains of Southeast Texas, roughly 30 mi (48 km) north of the Gulf of Mexico. The county is largely covered by the dense forest of the Big Thicket. It is crossed by numerous small streams and creeks that drain the county into the Neches River, which forms the eastern boundary of the county.

=== Major highways ===
- U.S. Highway 69/U.S. Highway 287
- U.S. Highway 96
- State Highway 105
- State Highway 326
- State Highway 327

=== Adjacent counties ===
- Tyler County (northern)
- Jasper County (east)
- Orange County (southeast)
- Jefferson County (south)
- Liberty County (southwest)
- Polk County (northwest)

Its eastern boundaries with Jasper County and Orange County are formed by the Neches River. The southern boundary with Jefferson County is formed by Pine Island Bayou

=== National protected area ===
- Big Thicket National Preserve (part)

== Communities ==
=== Cities ===
- Kountze (county seat)
- Lumberton
- Rose Hill Acres
- Silsbee
- Sour Lake

=== Census-designated places ===
- Pinewood Estates
- Wildwood (partly in Tyler County)

=== Unincorporated communities ===
- Batson
- Honey Island
- Saratoga
- Thicket
- Village Mills
- Votaw

=== Ghost town ===
- Bragg

== Demographics ==
Historical population
Census	Pop.	Note	%±
1860	1,353		—
1870	1,460		7.9%
1880	1,870		28.1%
1890	3,956		111.6%
1900	5,049		27.6%
1910	12,947		156.4%
1920	15,983		23.4%
1930	13,936		−12.8%
1940	15,875		13.9%
1950	19,535		23.1%
1960	24,629		26.1%
1970	29,996		21.8%
1980	40,721		35.8%
1990	41,320		1.5%
2000	48,073		16.3%
2010	54,635		13.7%
2020	56,231		2.9%
2025 (est.)	58,723	▲	4.4%
U.S. Decennial Census; 1850–2010 2010 2020

=== Racial and ethnic composition ===
Hardin County, Texas – Racial and ethnic composition Note: the US Census treats Hispanic/Latino as an ethnic category. This table excludes Latinos from the racial categories and assigns them to a separate category. Hispanics/Latinos may be of any race.
Race / Ethnicity (NH = Non-Hispanic)	Pop 1980	Pop 1990	Pop 2000	Pop 2010	Pop 2020	% 1980	% 1990	% 2000	% 2010	% 2020
White alone (NH)	35,953	37,006	42,941	48,088	46,934	88.29%	89.56%	89.32%	88.02%	83.47%
Black or African American alone (NH)	4,097	3,459	3,310	3,181	3,037	10.06%	8.37%	6.89%	5.82%	5.40%
Native American or Alaska Native alone (NH)	40	117	133	182	190	0.10%	0.28%	0.28%	0.33%	0.34%
Asian alone (NH)	36	54	108	269	399	0.09%	0.13%	0.22%	0.49%	0.71%
Native Hawaiian or Pacific Islander alone (NH)	x	x	4	6	34	x	x	0.01%	0.01%	0.06%
Other race alone (NH)	23	5	20	19	149	0.06%	0.01%	0.04%	0.03%	0.26%
Mixed race or Multiracial (NH)	x	x	334	506	2,071	x	x	0.69%	0.93%	3.68%
Hispanic or Latino (any race)	572	679	1,223	2,384	3,417	1.40%	1.64%	2.54%	4.36%	6.08%
Total	40,721	41,320	48,073	54,635	56,231	100.00%	100.00%	100.00%	100.00%	100.00%

=== 2020 census ===
As of the 2020 census, the county had a population of 56,231. The median age was 39.9 years. About 24.2% of residents were under 18 and 18.1% were 65 or older. For every 100 females, there were 96.4 males, and for every 100 females 18 and over, there were 94.0 males 18 and over.

The racial makeup of the county was 85.4% White, 5.5% Black or African American, 0.5% American Indian and Alaska Native, 0.7% Asian, 0.1% Native Hawaiian and Pacific Islander, 1.8% from some other race, and 6.1% from two or more races. Hispanic or Latino residents of any race comprised 6.1% of the population.

About 49.3% of residents lived in urban areas, while 50.7% lived in rural areas.

Of the 21,616 households in the county, 33.6% had children under 18 living in them, 54.9% were married-couple households, 16.6% were households with a male householder and no spouse or partner present, and 23.6% were households with a female householder and no spouse or partner present. About 24.1% of all households were made up of individuals, and 11.6% had someone living alone who was 65 or older.

The county had 24,003 housing units, of which 9.9% were vacant. Among occupied housing units, 79.0% were owner-occupied and 21.0% were renter-occupied. The homeowner vacancy rate was 1.7% and the rental vacancy rate was 12.8%.

=== 2010 census ===
As of the 2010 census, Hardin County had a population of 54,635. The ethnic and racial composition of the population was 88.0% non-Hispanic white, 5.8% African American, 0.4% Native American, 0.5% Asian, 1.3% from some other race, and 1.3% from two or more races.

=== 2000 census ===
As of the 2000 census, 48,073 people, 17,805 households, and 13,638 families resided in the county. The population density was 54 people/mi^{2} (21 people/km^{2}). The 19,836 housing units averaged 22 per square mile (8.5/km^{2}). The racial makeup of the county was 90.86% White, 6.91% Black or African American, 0.32% Native American, 0.23% Asian, 0.01% Pacific Islander, 0.74% from other races, and 0.93% from two or more races. About 2.54% of the population were Hispanic or Latino of any race.

Of the 17,805 households, 37.2% had children under 18 living with them, 62.6% were married couples living together, 10.2% had a female householder with no husband present, and 23.4% were not families; 20.7% of all households were made up of individuals, and 9.2% had someone living alone who was 65 or older. The average household size was 2.68, and the average family size was 3.09.

In the county, the age distribution was 27.8% under 18, 8.5% from 18 to 24, 28.3% from 25 to 44, 23.2% from 45 to 64, and 12.2% who were 65 or older. The median age was 36 years. For every 100 females, there were 96.7 males. For every 100 females 18 and over, there were 92.4 males.

The median income in the county for a household was $37,612 and for a family was $42,890. Males had a median income of $35,881 versus $22,823 for females. The per capita income for the county was $17,962. About 8.8% of families and 11.20% of the population were below the poverty line, including 13.3% of those under 18 and 10.6% of those 65 or over.

== Politics ==
=== United States Congress ===
Senators	Name	Party	First Elected	Level
Senate Class 1	John Cornyn	Republican	2002	Senior Senator
Senate Class 2	Ted Cruz	Republican	2012	Junior Senator
Representatives	Name	Party	First Elected	Area(s) of Hardin County Represented
District 36	Brian Babin	Republican	New district created with 2010 census. First elected 2014.	Entire county

United States presidential election results for Hardin County, Texas
Year	Republican		Democratic		Third party(ies)	
Year	No.	%	No.	%	No.	%
1912	101	7.18%	979	69.58%	327	23.24%
1916	158	10.30%	1,279	83.38%	97	6.32%
1920	202	14.68%	999	72.60%	175	12.72%
1924	645	28.31%	1,516	66.55%	117	5.14%
1928	951	47.96%	1,032	52.04%	0	0.00%
1932	161	5.47%	2,783	94.53%	0	0.00%
1936	119	4.82%	2,351	95.18%	0	0.00%
1940	226	7.01%	2,997	92.93%	2	0.06%
1944	243	7.77%	2,632	84.20%	251	8.03%
1948	196	6.44%	2,233	73.38%	614	20.18%
1952	1,653	32.53%	3,423	67.36%	6	0.12%
1956	2,130	47.12%	2,371	52.46%	19	0.42%
1960	2,115	32.79%	4,315	66.89%	21	0.33%
1964	1,987	27.81%	5,143	71.97%	16	0.22%
1968	1,986	22.41%	2,894	32.66%	3,982	44.93%
1972	5,190	63.63%	2,952	36.19%	15	0.18%
1976	4,046	37.86%	6,558	61.36%	84	0.79%
1980	6,087	44.33%	7,358	53.58%	287	2.09%
1984	8,380	55.11%	6,782	44.60%	44	0.29%
1988	6,897	45.46%	8,245	54.34%	31	0.20%
1992	5,885	35.04%	6,753	40.21%	4,155	24.74%
1996	8,529	47.65%	7,179	40.11%	2,192	12.25%
2000	11,962	67.07%	5,595	31.37%	279	1.56%
2004	15,030	72.57%	5,608	27.08%	72	0.35%
2008	16,603	80.20%	3,939	19.03%	160	0.77%
2012	17,746	83.33%	3,359	15.77%	192	0.90%
2016	19,606	86.07%	2,780	12.20%	394	1.73%
2020	23,858	86.33%	3,474	12.57%	303	1.10%
2024	24,691	87.69%	3,347	11.89%	119	0.42%

United States Senate election results for Hardin County, Texas1
Year	Republican		Democratic		Third party(ies)	
Year	No.	%	No.	%	No.	%
2024	23,992	85.48%	3,603	12.84%	473	1.69%

United States Senate election results for Hardin County, Texas2
Year	Republican		Democratic		Third party(ies)	
Year	No.	%	No.	%	No.	%
2020	23,516	85.87%	3,388	12.37%	480	1.75%

Texas Gubernatorial election results for Hardin County
Year	Republican		Democratic		Third party(ies)	
Year	No.	%	No.	%	No.	%
2022	17,447	88.88%	2,035	10.37%	147	0.75%

== Education ==
School districts include:

- Hardin-Jefferson Independent School District
- Kountze Independent School District
- Lumberton Independent School District
- Silsbee Independent School District
- Warren Independent School District
- West Hardin County Consolidated Independent School District

The Texas Legislature specifies community college districts for most places in Texas; as of 2026 it has not directly assigned any areas in Hardin County to a specific community college district.

== See also ==
- National Register of Historic Places listings in Hardin County, Texas
- Recorded Texas Historic Landmarks in Hardin County
