= Paulding Light =

Light that appears in a Michigan valley

Coordinates: 46°21′08″N 89°10′43.5″W

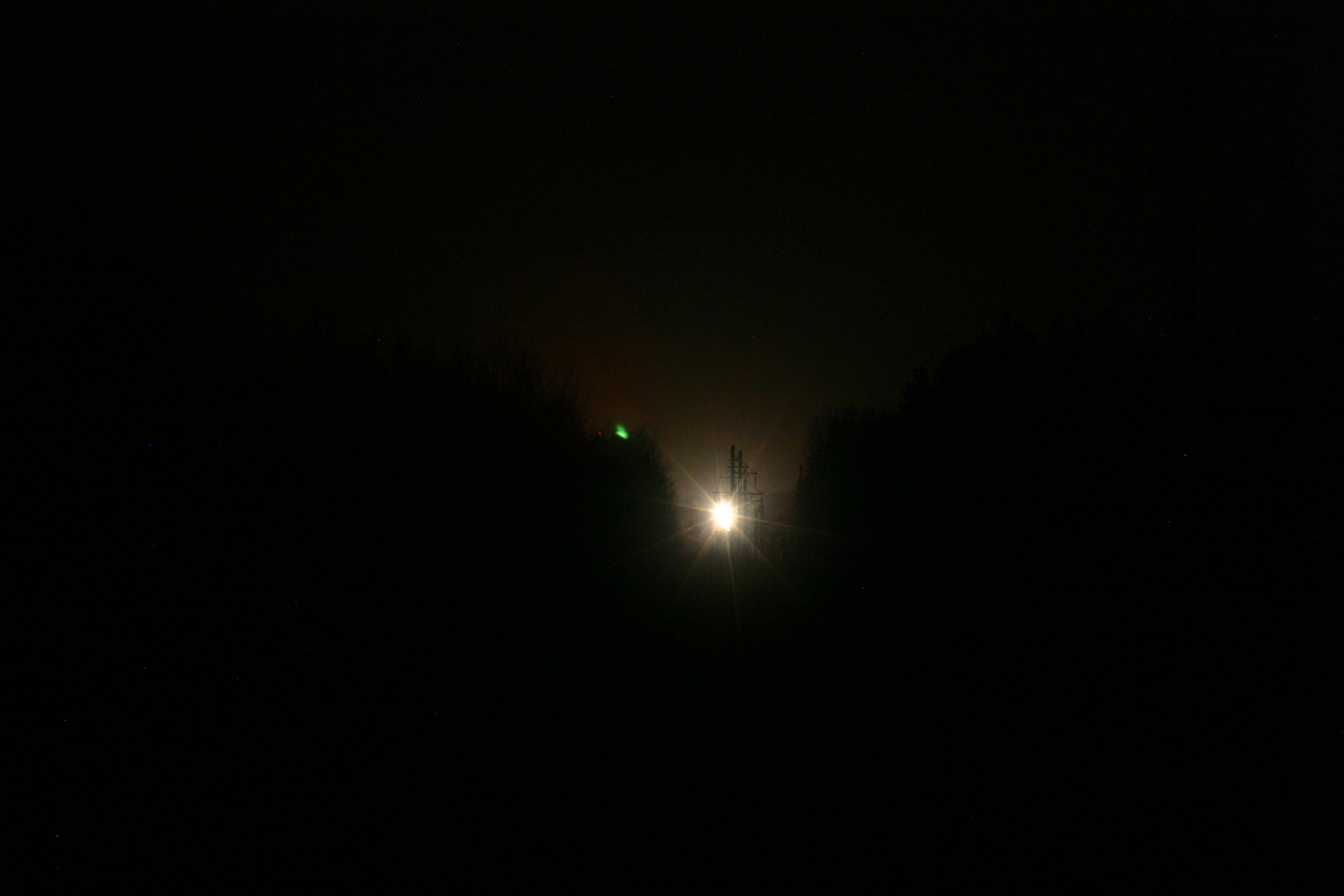
Paulding Light

The Paulding Light (also called the Lights of Paulding or the Dog Meadow Light) is a light that appears in a valley outside Paulding, Michigan. Reports of the light have appeared since the 1960s, with popular folklore providing such explanations as ghosts, geologic activity, or swamp gas.

In 2010, Michigan Tech students conducting a scientific investigation of the light were able to see automobile headlights and tail lights when viewing the light through a telescope. They recreated the effect of the light by driving a car through a specific stretch of US Highway 45 (US 45).

== Location ==
The light appears in a valley outside of Paulding, Michigan, in the Upper Peninsula, near Watersmeet off US 45 on Robbins Pond Road/Old US 45.

== Folklore ==
The first recorded sighting of the Paulding Light was in 1966 when a group of teenagers reported the light to a local sheriff. Since then, a number of other individuals have reported seeing the light, which is said to appear nearly every night at the site.

Although stories related to the light vary, the most popular legend involves the death of a railroad brakeman. The legend states that the valley once contained railroad tracks and the light is the lantern of the brakeman who was killed while attempting to stop an oncoming train from colliding with railway cars stopped on the tracks. Another story claims the light is the ghost of a slain mail courier, while another says that it is the ghost of a Native American dancing on the power lines that run through the valley. According to John Carlisle of the Detroit Free Press, one legend is that it is a "grandparent looking for a lost grandchild with a lantern that needs constant relighting, the reason the light seems to come and go".

== Scientific investigation ==
While popular folklore attributes paranormal or supernatural explanations for the light, scientific investigations show that it is due to car headlights on the north–south stretch of US 45, approximately five miles (8.0 km) north of the observation area. In October 1990, a group of investigators using telescopic, spectroscopic, and travel time analysis identified the Paulding Lights as the head and tail lights of vehicles traveling on US 45 north of the observation site.

In 2010, students from the Michigan Tech chapter of the Society of Photo-Optical Instrumentation Engineers (SPIE) used a telescope to examine the light, and were able to see vehicles and stationary objects on a highway, including a specific Adopt a Highway sign. They also recreated other observations related to the light, such as multicolored patterns (police flashers) and variations in intensity (high and low beams). They hypothesized that the stability of an inversion layer allowed the lights to be visible from the stretch of highway 4.5 miles (7.2 km) away.

Paranormal researcher Ben Radford says that there are many cases of similar light reports across the U.S., but there are many possible sources for the lights so that there is no unifying theory as to what they can be. Some are unexplained, but others can be "headlights, campfires, aircraft, cloud reflections of distant city or vehicle lights, insects and so on... at the end of the day ..." Radford says, "it's more fun to imagine the distant glimmer is a ghostly railroad brakeman's phantom lantern than the headlights of a 2005 Honda Civic".

== See also ==
- Brown Mountain lights
- Gurdon Light
- Hessdalen lights
- Light of Saratoga
- Longdendale lights
- Maco light
- Marfa lights
- The Spooklight
- St. Elmo's fire
- St. Louis light
- Will-o'-the-wisp
