= Braxton Bragg =

Confederate general (1817–1876)

General Braxton Bragg
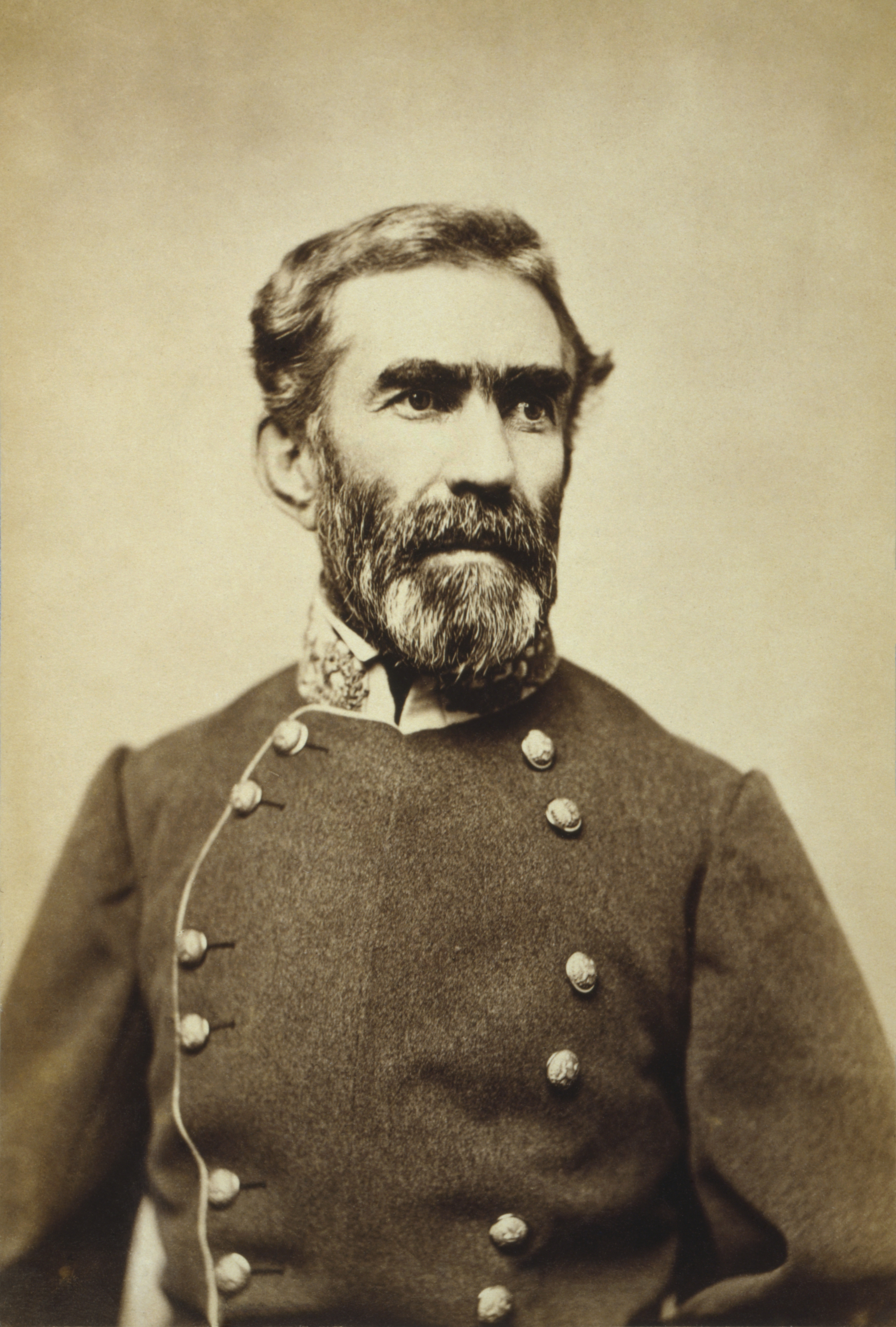
- Bragg c. 1861–65
- Born: March 22, 1817; Warrenton, North Carolina, U.S.
- Died: September 27, 1876 (aged 59); Galveston, Texas, U.S.
- Burial place: Magnolia Cemetery, Mobile, Alabama; 30°40′30.3″N 88°03′45.7″W
- Education: United States Military Academy
- Spouse: Eliza Brooks Ellis (m. 1849)
- Military career
- Allegiance: United States; Confederate States
- Branch: United States Army; Confederate States Army
- Service years: 1837–1856 (USA); 1861–1865 (CSA)
- Rank: Brevet Lieutenant Colonel (USA); General (CSA)
- Nicknames: "Brax" "Old Porcupine" (Note: aliases by General E. Kirby Smith)
- Commands: Army of Mississippi (1862); Army of Tennessee (1863)
- Conflicts: Second Seminole War; Mexican–American War; Siege of Fort Brown; Battle of Monterrey; Battle of Buena Vista; American Civil War; Battle of Shiloh; Siege of Corinth; Battle of Perryville; Battle of Stones River; Tullahoma campaign; Battle of Chickamauga; Battles for Chattanooga; Second Battle of Fort Fisher; Battle of Wyse Fork; Battle of Bentonville

Signature
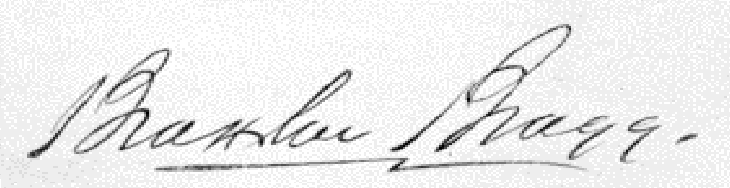

Braxton Bragg (March 22, 1817 – September 27, 1876) was an American military officer during the Second Seminole War and Mexican–American War. He later served as a Confederate general in the American Civil War, seeing action in the western theater. His most important role was as the commander of the Army of Mississippi, later renamed the Army of Tennessee, from June 1862 until December 1863.

Bragg, a native of Warrenton, North Carolina, was educated at West Point and became an artillery officer. He served in Florida and then received three brevet promotions for distinguished service in the Mexican–American War, most notably the Battle of Buena Vista. He resigned from the U.S. Army in 1856 to become a sugar plantation owner in Louisiana. At the start of the Civil War, Bragg trained soldiers in the Gulf Coast region. He was a corps commander at the Battle of Shiloh, where he launched several costly and unsuccessful frontal assaults but nonetheless was commended for his conduct and bravery.

In June 1862, Bragg was elevated to command the Army of Mississippi (later known as the Army of Tennessee). He and Brigadier General Edmund Kirby Smith attempted an invasion of Kentucky in 1862, but Bragg retreated following a minor tactical victory at the Battle of Perryville in October. In December, at Murfreesboro, Tennessee, he fought the Battle of Stones River against the Army of the Cumberland under Major General William Rosecrans. This bloody and inconclusive battle ended with his retreat. After months without significant fighting, Bragg was outmaneuvered by Rosecrans in the Tullahoma campaign in June 1863, causing him to surrender Middle Tennessee to the Union. Bragg retreated to Chattanooga but evacuated it in September as Rosecrans' troops entered Georgia. Later that month, with the assistance of Confederate forces from the eastern theater under James Longstreet, Bragg was able to defeat Rosecrans at the Battle of Chickamauga, the bloodiest battle in the western theater, and the only significant Confederate victory therein. Bragg forced Rosecrans back into Tennessee, but was criticized for the heavy casualties his army suffered and for not mounting an effective pursuit. In November, Bragg's army was routed by Major General Ulysses S. Grant in the Battles for Chattanooga and pushed back to Georgia. Confederate president Jefferson Davis subsequently relieved Bragg of command, recalling him to Richmond as his chief military advisor. Bragg briefly returned to the field as a corps commander near the war's end during the Carolinas campaign.

Bragg is generally considered among the worst generals of the Civil War. Most of the battles he engaged in ended in defeat. Bragg was extremely unpopular with both the officers and ordinary men under his command, who criticized him for numerous perceived faults, including poor battlefield strategy, a quick temper, and overzealous discipline. Bragg has a generally poor reputation with historians, though some point towards the failures of Bragg's subordinates, especially Major General and former bishop Leonidas Polk—a close ally of Davis and known enemy of Bragg—as more significant factors in the many Confederate defeats under Bragg's command. The losses suffered by Bragg's forces are cited as highly consequential to the ultimate defeat of the Confederate States of America.

== Early life and education ==
Braxton Bragg was born in Warrenton, North Carolina, one of the six sons of Thomas and Margaret Crosland Bragg. One of his older brothers was future Confederate attorney general Thomas Bragg. Bragg was also a cousin of Edward S. Bragg, who would become a Union general in the Civil War. He was often ridiculed as a child because of unsubstantiated rumors about his mother's conviction and imprisonment for the murder of an African American freeman, and some of those rumors stated that he was born in prison. Grady McWhiney, the principal biographer of Bragg's early life and career, states that the Bragg family was law-abiding despite these rumors. Although considered by his neighbors to be from the lower class, Thomas Bragg was a carpenter and contractor who became wealthy enough to send Braxton to the Warrenton Male Academy, one of the best schools in the state. He was descended from Captain Christopher Newport of Jamestown, Virginia, and his son-in-law Thomas Bragg (1579–1665), who was born in England and settled in the Colony of Virginia. In the thousands of letters that Bragg wrote during his lifetime, he spoke fondly of his father, but never mentioned his mother.

== West Point ==
When Bragg was only ten years old, his father decided on a military career for him and sought ways to obtain a nomination to the United States Military Academy. Eventually, the oldest Bragg son, John, who had recently been elected as a state legislator, obtained the support of U.S. senator for North Carolina Willie P. Mangum. With Mangum as his sponsor, West Point admitted Braxton at the age of 16. His classmates included notable future Civil War Union generals Joseph Hooker and John Sedgwick, and future Confederate generals John C. Pemberton, Jubal Early, and William H. T. Walker. Bragg did well in academic pursuits because of his superior memory rather than diligent study and received fewer disciplinary demerits than most of his contemporaries. He graduated fifth of fifty cadets from the West Point Class of 1837 and was commissioned a second lieutenant in the 3rd U.S. Artillery.

== Military service ==
=== Early career ===
Bragg served in the Second Seminole War in Florida, initially as an assistant commissary officer and regimental adjutant, seeing no actual combat. He soon began to suffer from a series of illnesses that he blamed on the tropical climate. He sought a medical transfer and was briefly assigned to recruiting duty in Philadelphia, but in October 1840, he was ordered back to Florida. He became a company commander in the 3rd Artillery and commanded Fort Marion, near St. Augustine. In this assignment, he stayed relatively healthy but tended toward overwork, laboring administratively to improve the living conditions of his men. He launched a series of argumentative letters with senior Army officials, including the adjutant general and Army paymaster, that established his reputation as "disputatious".

Bragg had a reputation for being a disciplinarian who strictly adhered to regulations. There is a famous apocryphal story, included in Ulysses S. Grant's memoirs, about Bragg as a company commander at a frontier post where he also served as quartermaster. He submitted a requisition for supplies for his company, then, as quartermaster, declined to fill it. As company commander, he resubmitted the requisition, giving additional reasons for his requirements, but as the quartermaster, he denied the request again. Realizing that he was at a personal impasse, he referred the matter to the post commandant, who exclaimed, "My God, Mr. Bragg, you have quarreled with every officer in the army, and now you are quarreling with yourself!" While Grant did circulate the story, he admitted that he knew nothing of its truthfulness and no one else came forward to attest to its veracity.

Some of Bragg's soldiers attempted to assassinate him on two occasions in August and September 1847, but he was not injured either time. In the more serious of the two incidents, near Walnut Spring, or El Bosque de San Domingo, one of his soldiers detonated a 12-pound artillery shell underneath his cot. Although the cot was destroyed, Bragg himself somehow emerged without a scratch. Bragg had suspicions about the perpetrator's identity but had insufficient evidence to bring charges. Private Samuel R. Church later claimed responsibility for the attack. In 1851, Church had escaped confinement from the Benicia Army Barracks, but was caught by the San Francisco Committee of Vigilance. He wisely denied involvement in Bragg's assassination attempt and blamed a former fellow soldier, Thomas Hackett.

The 3rd Artillery relocated to Fort Moultrie, Charleston, South Carolina, in 1843. Here, Bragg was stationed with three future Union Army generals that he came to consider close friends: George H. Thomas, John F. Reynolds (both of whom were lieutenants who reported to Bragg) and William T. Sherman. Bragg continued his controversial writing, this time a series of nine articles published 1844–45 in the Southern Literary Messenger. The series, "Notes on Our Army," published anonymously (as "A Subaltern"), included specific attacks on the policies of general in chief Winfield Scott, whom he called a "vain, petty, conniving man." There were also numerous attacks on Army administrative policies and officers. He included thoughtful recommendations on a proposed structure for the Army general staff that were ignored at the time but echoed in reorganizations that occurred in the early 20th century.

[His actions] established Bragg's distinction as the most cantankerous man in the army. He had been court-martialled and convicted; he had been censured by the Secretary of War, the adjutant general, and the commander of the Eastern division. No other junior officer could boast of so many high-ranking enemies. Both the commander of the Third Artillery and the commanding general of the United States Army hated Bragg. His future in his regiment and in the army seemed most uncertain.

— Grady McWhiney, Braxton Bragg and Confederate Defeat

Bragg's articles came to the attention of Representative James G. Clinton, a New York Democrat and political opponent of Scott's. While Bragg was on leave in Washington, D.C., in March 1844, Clinton called him to testify before his House Committee on Public Expenditures. Scott ordered him not to testify, in defiance of the Congressional subpoena. Bragg was arrested and sent to Fort Monroe, Virginia, where he was court-martialed for disobeying orders and disrespecting his superior officers. Bragg conducted his own defense and attempted to turn the trial into a condemnation of Scott. He was found guilty, but an official reprimand from the secretary of war and suspension at half pay for two months were relatively mild punishments, and Bragg was not deterred from future criticisms of his superiors.

=== Mexican–American War ===
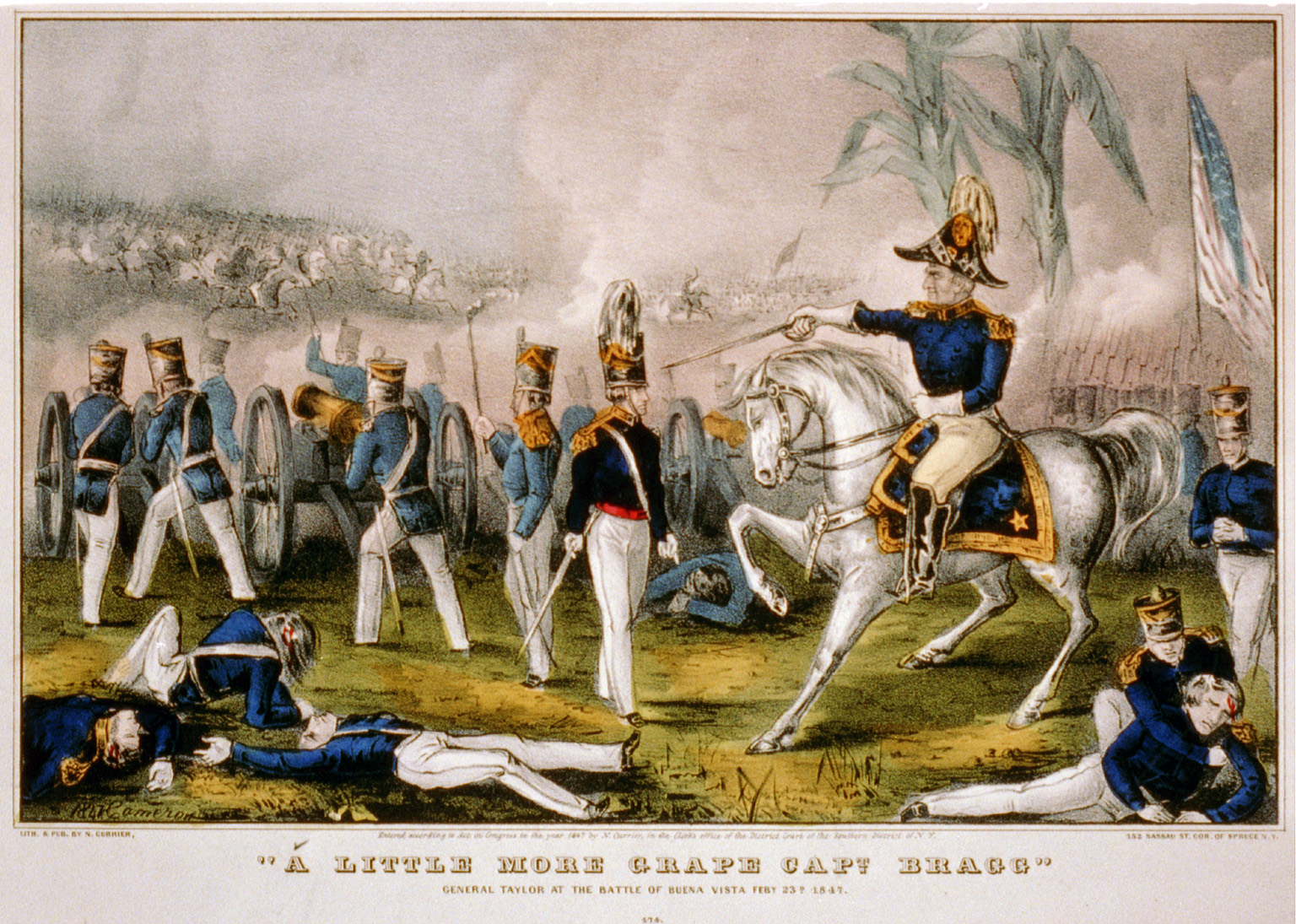
A Little More Grape, Capt. Bragg by N. Currier

In the summer of 1845, Bragg and his artillery company were ordered to join Gen. Zachary Taylor in the defense of Texas from Mexico. He won promotions for bravery and distinguished conduct in the Mexican–American War, including a brevet promotion to captain for the Battle of Fort Brown (May 1846), to major for the Battle of Monterrey (September 1846), and to lieutenant colonel for the Battle of Buena Vista (February 1847). Bragg was also promoted to captain within the regular army in June 1846. He became widely admired in Taylor's army for the discipline and drill of his men and the newly tried tactics of light artillery that proved decisive in most of his engagements against the Mexican Army. But it was Buena Vista that brought him national fame. His timely placement of artillery into a gap in the line helped repulse a numerically superior Mexican attack. He fought in support of Col. Jefferson Davis and the Mississippi Rifles, which earned him the admiration of the future U.S. secretary of war and president of the Confederacy.

An anecdote circulated about Gen. Taylor commanding, "A little more of the grape, Capt. Bragg," which caused him to redouble his efforts and save the day. The stories are probably apocryphal and, according to the diary of Ethan Allen Hitchcock, Taylor's Chief of Staff (and recent son-in-law) Maj. William Bliss confirmed that "the stories of the General in connection with Bragg are all false. He never said, 'A little more grape, Captain Bragg,' nor did he say, 'Major Bliss and I will support you.'" Nevertheless, Bragg returned to the United States as a popular hero. A northwestern outpost, Fort Bragg, California, was named in his honor. The citizens of Warrenton presented him with a ceremonial sword. Congressman David Outlaw wrote about the honor: "Col. Bragg having, no thanks to them, won for himself a brilliant reputation, is now the object of the most fulsome adulation. Those who formerly sneered at the Braggs as plebeians, as unfit associates for them, they are glad to honor. With what scorn must Col. Bragg, in his secret heart regard them." Bragg traveled to New York, Washington, Mobile, and New Orleans, and in each place, he was honored.

On December 31, 1855, Bragg submitted his resignation from the Army, which became effective on January 3, 1856. He and his wife purchased a sugar plantation of 1,600 acres (6.5 km^{2}) 3 miles (4.8 km) north of Thibodaux, Louisiana. Never one to oppose slavery in concept—his father and wife were slave owners—he used 105 enslaved African-Americans on his property. He continued to uphold his reputation as a stern disciplinarian and an advocate of military efficiency. His methods resulted in almost immediate profitability, despite a large mortgage on the property. He became active in local politics and was elected to the Board of Public Works in 1860. Throughout the 1850s, Bragg had been disturbed by the accelerating sectional crisis. He opposed the concept of secession, believing that no majority could set aside a written constitution in a republic, but this belief would soon be tested.

=== American Civil War ===
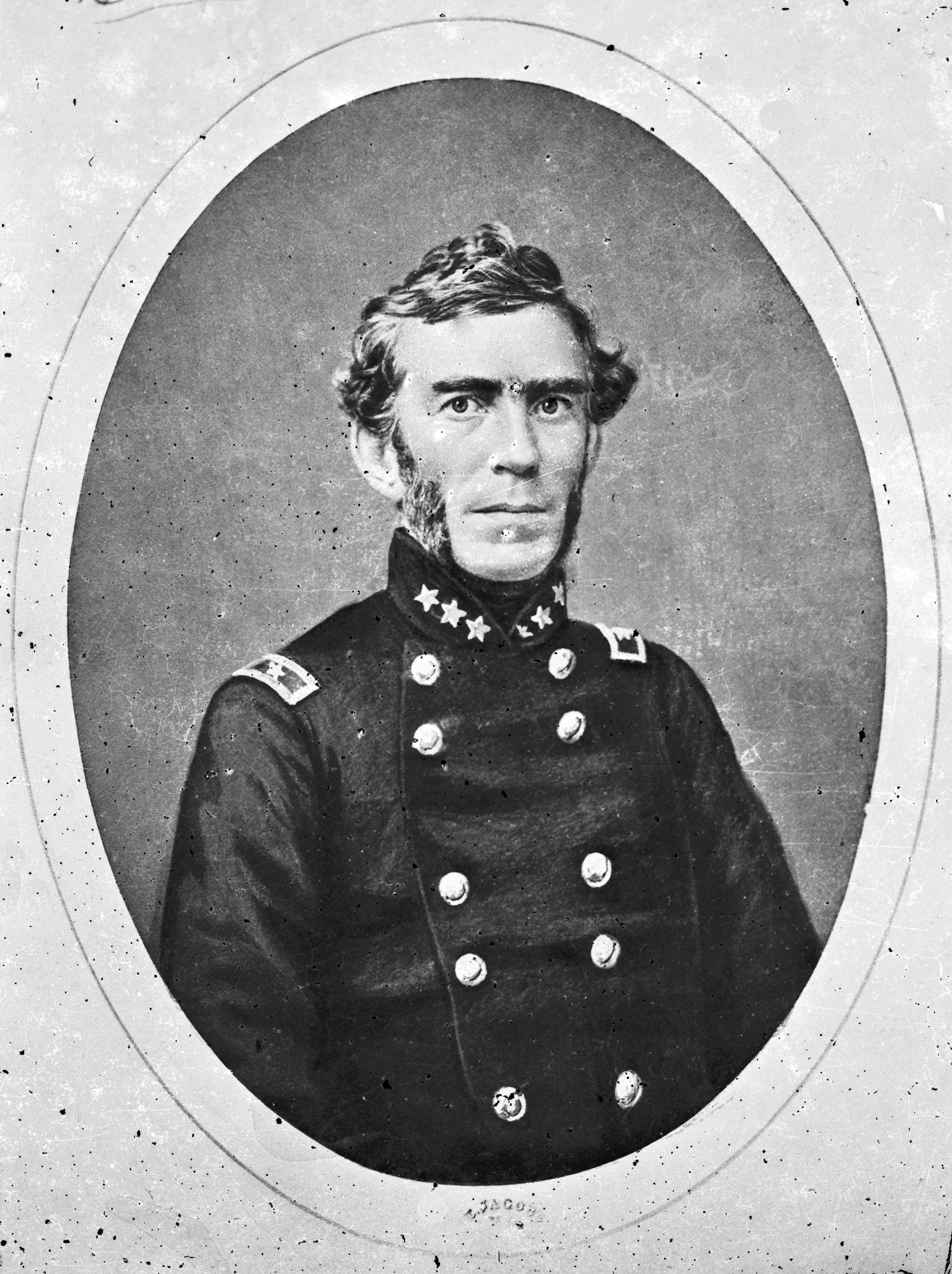
Braxton Bragg, CSA

[Bragg] was the only General in command of an Army who has shown himself equal to the management of volunteers and at the same time commanded their love and respect.

— Confederate President Jefferson Davis

Before the start of the Civil War, Bragg was a colonel in the Louisiana Militia. On December 12, 1860, Governor Thomas O. Moore appointed him to the state military board, an organization charged with creating a 5,000-man army. He took the assignment even though he had been opposed to secession. On January 11, 1861, Bragg led a group of 500 volunteers to Baton Rouge, where they persuaded the commander of the federal arsenal there to surrender. The state convention on secession also established a state army, and Moore appointed Bragg its commander, with the rank of major general, on February 20, 1861. He commanded the forces around New Orleans until April 16, but his commission was transferred to be a brigadier general of the Confederate States Army on March 7, 1861. He commanded forces in Pensacola, Florida, Alabama, and the Department of West Florida and was promoted to major general on September 12, 1861. His tenure was successful, and he trained his men to be some of the best-disciplined troops in the Confederate Army, such as the 5th Georgia and the 6th Florida Regiments.

In December, President Davis asked Bragg to take command of the Trans-Mississippi Department, but Bragg declined. He was concerned about the prospects of victory west of the Mississippi River and the poorly supplied and ill-disciplined troops there. He was also experiencing one of the periodic episodes of ill health that plagued him throughout the war. For years he had suffered from rheumatism, dyspepsia, nerves, and severe migraine headaches, which undoubtedly contributed to his disagreeable personal style. The command went to Earl Van Dorn. Bragg proposed to Davis that he change his strategy of attempting to defend every square mile of Confederate territory, recommending that his troops were of less value on the Gulf Coast than they would be farther to the north, concentrated with other forces for an attack against the Union Army in Tennessee. Bragg transported about 10,000 men to Corinth, Mississippi, in February 1862 and was charged with improving the poor discipline of the Confederate troops already assembled under General Albert Sidney Johnston.

==== Battle of Shiloh ====
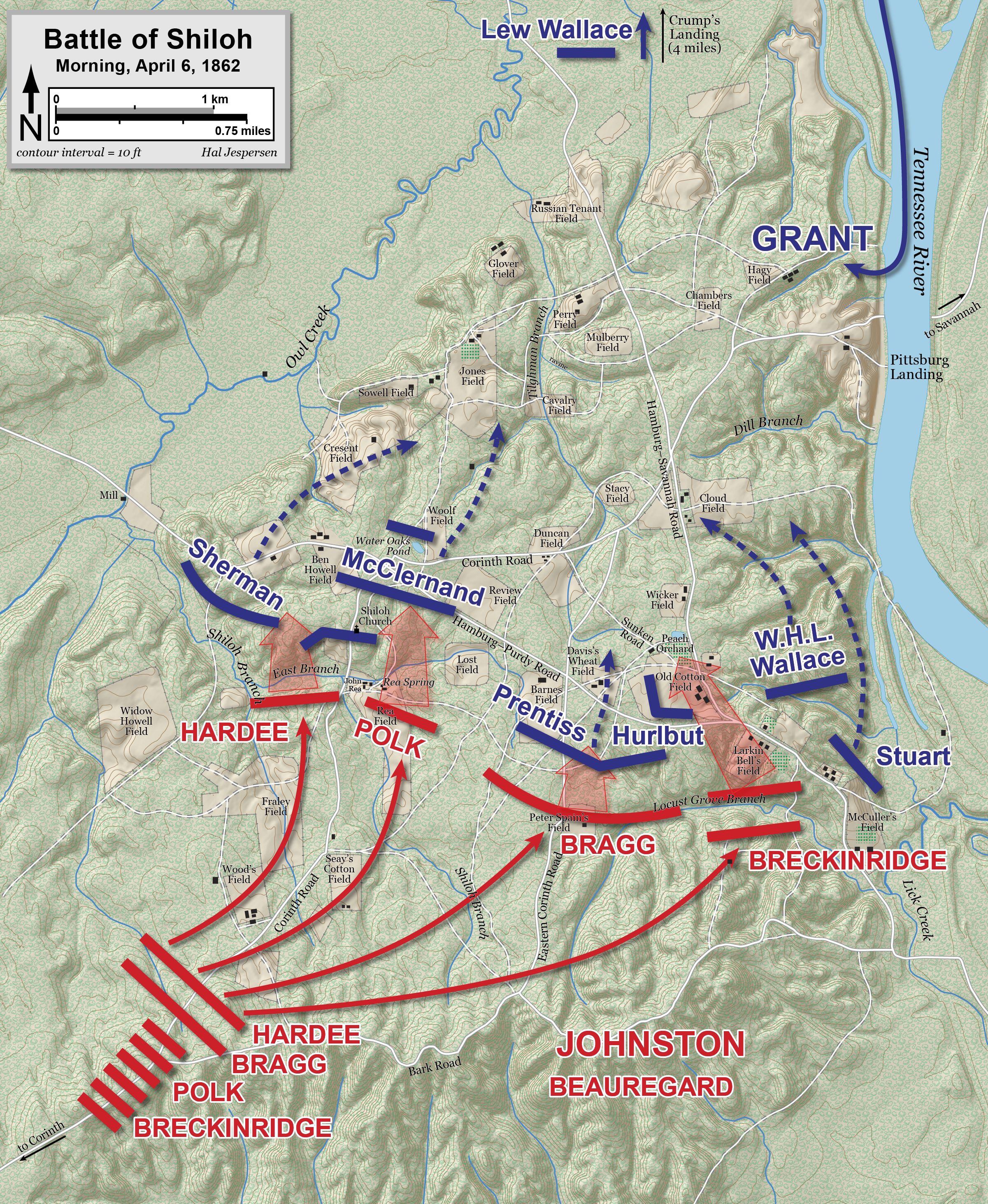
Map of the Battle of Shiloh, morning of April 6, 1862 Confederate Union

Bragg commanded a corps (and was also chief of staff) under Johnston at the Battle of Shiloh, April 6–7, 1862. In the initial surprise Confederate advance, Bragg's corps was ordered to attack in a line almost 3 miles (4.8 km) long, but he soon began directing activities of the units that found themselves around the center of the battlefield. His men became bogged down against a Union salient called the Hornet's Nest, which he attacked for hours with piecemeal frontal assaults. After Johnston was killed in the battle, General P. G. T. Beauregard assumed command and appointed Bragg his second in command. Bragg was dismayed when Beauregard called off a late afternoon assault against the Union's final position, which was vigorously defended, calling it their last opportunity for victory. On the second day of battle, the Union army counterattacked, and the Confederates retreated to Corinth.

Bragg received public praise for his conduct in the battle. On April 12, 1862, Jefferson Davis appointed Bragg a full general, the sixth man to achieve that rank and one of only seven in the history of the Confederacy. His date of rank was April 6, 1862, coinciding with the first day at Shiloh. After the Siege of Corinth, Beauregard departed on sick leave, leaving Bragg in temporary command of the army in Tupelo, Mississippi. Still, Beauregard failed to inform President Davis of his departure and spent two weeks absent without leave. Davis was looking for someone to replace Beauregard because of his perceived poor performance at Corinth, and the opportunity presented itself when Beauregard left without permission. Bragg was then appointed his successor as commander of the Western Department (known formally as Department Number Two), including the Army of Mississippi, on June 17, 1862.

==== Battle of Perryville ====
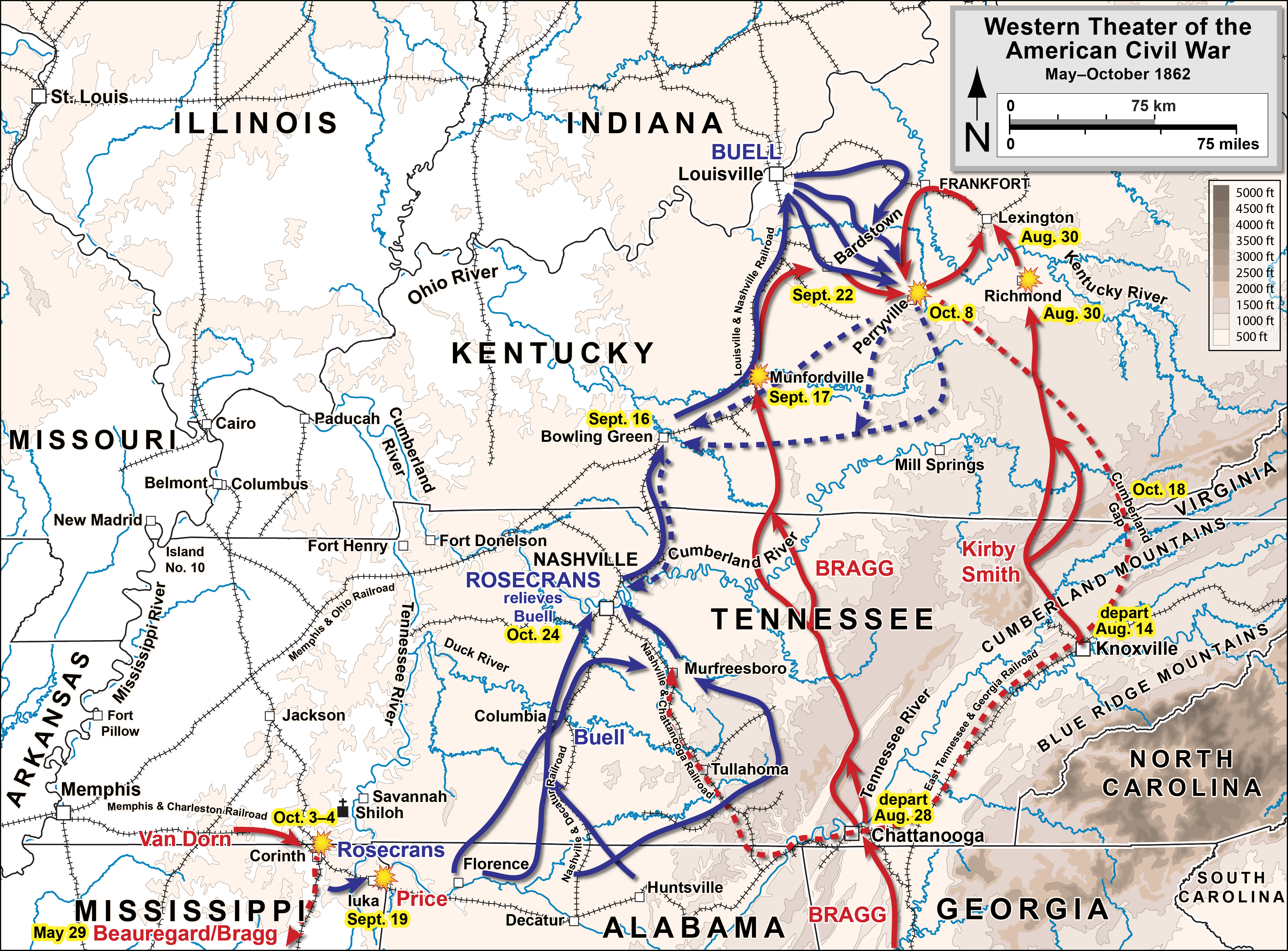
Western theater operations from the Siege of Corinth through the Kentucky campaign

In August 1862, Confederate Maj. Gen. Edmund Kirby Smith decided to invade Kentucky from Eastern Tennessee, hoping that he could arouse supporters of the Confederate cause in the border state and draw the Union forces under Maj. Gen. Don Carlos Buell, beyond the Ohio River. Bragg considered various options, including an attempt to retake Corinth or to advance against Buell's army through Middle Tennessee. He eventually heeded Kirby Smith's calls for reinforcement and decided to relocate his Army of Mississippi to join him. He moved 30,000 soldiers in a tortuous railroad journey from Tupelo through Mobile and Montgomery to Chattanooga, while his cavalry and artillery moved by road. Although Bragg was the senior general in the theater, President Davis had established Kirby Smith's Department of East Tennessee as an independent command, reporting directly to Richmond. This decision caused Bragg difficulty during the campaign.

Smith and Bragg met in Chattanooga on 31 July 1862. They devised a plan for the campaign: Kirby Smith's Army of Kentucky would first march into Kentucky to dispose of the Union defenders of Cumberland Gap. (Bragg's army was too exhausted from its long journey to begin immediate offensive operations.) Smith would return to join Bragg, and their combined forces would attempt to maneuver into Buell's rear and force a battle to protect his supply lines. Once the armies were combined, Bragg's seniority would apply, and Smith would be under his direct command. Assuming that Buell's army could be destroyed, Bragg and Smith would march farther north into Kentucky, a movement they assumed would be welcomed by the local populace. Any remaining Federal force would be defeated in a grand battle in Kentucky, establishing the Confederate frontier at the Ohio River.

On August 9, Smith informed Bragg that he was breaking the agreement and intended to bypass Cumberland Gap, leaving a small holding force to neutralize the Union garrison and move north. Unable to command Smith to honor their plan, Bragg focused on a movement to Lexington instead of Nashville. He cautioned Smith that Buell could pursue and defeat his smaller army before Bragg's army could join them.

Bragg departed from Chattanooga on August 27, just before Smith reached Lexington. On the way, he was distracted by the capture of a Union fort at Munfordville. He had to decide whether to continue toward a fight with Buell (over Louisville) or rejoin Smith, who had gained control of the center of the state by capturing Richmond and Lexington and threatened to move on Cincinnati. Bragg chose to rejoin Smith. He left his army and met Smith in Frankfort, where they attended the inauguration of Confederate Governor Richard Hawes on October 4. The inauguration ceremony was disrupted by the sound of approaching Union cannon fire, and the organizers canceled the inaugural ball scheduled for that evening.

On October 8, the armies met unexpectedly at the Battle of Perryville; they had skirmished the previous day as they were searching for nearby water sources. Bragg ordered the wing of his army under Maj. Gen. Leonidas Polk to attack what he thought was an isolated portion of Buell's command but had difficulty motivating Polk to begin the fight until Bragg arrived in person. Eventually, Polk attacked the corps of Maj. Gen. Alexander M. McCook on the Union army's left flank and forced it to fall back. By the end of the day, McCook had been driven back about a mile, but reinforcements had arrived to stabilize the line, and Bragg only then began to realize that his limited tactical victory in the bloody battle had been against less than half of Buell's army and the remainder was arriving quickly.

Kirby Smith pleaded with Bragg to follow up on his success: "For God's sake, General, let us fight Buell here." Bragg replied, "I will do it, sir," but then displayed what one observer called "a perplexity and vacillation which had now become simply appalling to Smith, to Hardee, and to Polk," he ordered his army to retreat through the Cumberland Gap to Knoxville. Bragg referred to his retreat as a withdrawal, the successful culmination of a giant raid. He had multiple reasons for withdrawing. Disheartening news had arrived from northern Mississippi that Earl Van Dorn and Sterling Price had been defeated at Corinth, just as Robert E. Lee had failed in his Maryland campaign. He saw that his army had little to gain from a further, isolated victory, whereas a defeat might cost not only the bountiful food and supplies yet collected but also his army. He wrote to his wife, "With the whole southwest thus in the enemy's possession, my crime would have been unpardonable had I kept my noble little army to be ice-bound in the northern clime, without tents or shoes, and obliged to forage daily for bread, etc." He was quickly called to Richmond to explain to Jefferson Davis the charges brought by his officers about how he had conducted his campaign, demanding that he be replaced as head of the army. Although Davis decided to leave the general in command, Bragg's relationship with his subordinates would be severely damaged. Upon rejoining the army, he ordered a movement to Murfreesboro, Tennessee.

==== Battle of Stones River ====
Bragg renamed his force the Army of Tennessee on November 20, 1862. Meanwhile, on October 24, Don Carlos Buell was replaced as commander of the Union Army of the Ohio by Maj. Gen. William S. Rosecrans, who immediately renamed it the Army of the Cumberland. In late December, Rosecrans advanced from Nashville against Bragg's position at Murfreesboro. Before Rosecrans could attack, Bragg launched a strong surprise attack against Rosecrans's right flank on December 31, 1862, the start of the Battle of Stones River. The Confederates drove the Union army back to a small defensive position. Still, they could not destroy it or break its supply line to Nashville, as Bragg intended. Despite this, Bragg considered the first day of battle a victory and assumed that Rosecrans would soon retreat. By January 2, 1863, however, the Union troops remained in place, and the battle resumed as Bragg launched an unsuccessful attack by the troops of Maj. Gen. John C. Breckinridge against the well-defended Union left flank. Recognizing his lack of progress, the severe winter weather, the arrival of supplies and reinforcements for Rosecrans, and heeding the recommendations of corps commanders Hardee and Polk, Bragg withdrew his army from the field to Tullahoma, Tennessee.

While Washington breathed a sigh of relief after Stones River, dissension came to a head in the Army of Tennessee. All of Bragg's corps and division commanders expressed a lack of confidence in their chief. Senior Generals William J. Hardee and Leonidas Polk asked Davis to put Johnston in command of the army. Division commander B. Franklin Cheatham vowed he would never again serve under Bragg. Breckinridge wanted to challenge Bragg to a duel. Bragg struck back, court-martialing one division commander (McCown) for disobeying orders, accusing another (Cheatham) of drunkenness during the battle, and blaming Breckinridge for inept leadership. This internecine donnybrook threatened to do more damage to the army than the Yankees had done. Disheartened, Bragg told a friend that it might "be better for the President to send someone to relieve me," and wrote Davis to the same effect.

— James M. McPherson, Battle Cry of Freedom: The Civil War Era

Bragg's generals were vocal in their dissatisfaction with his command during the Kentucky campaign and Stones River. He reacted to the rumors of criticism by circulating a letter to his corps and division commanders that asked them to confirm in writing that they had recommended withdrawing after the latter battle, stating that if he had misunderstood them and withdrawn mistakenly, he would willingly step down. He wrote the letter when several of his most faithful supporters were on leave for illness or wounds. Bragg's critics, including William J. Hardee, interpreted the letter as having an implied secondary question—had Bragg lost the confidence of his senior commanders? Leonidas Polk did not reply to the implied question but wrote directly to his friend, Jefferson Davis, recommending that Bragg be replaced.

Davis responded to the complaints by dispatching Gen. Joseph E. Johnston to investigate the army's condition. Davis assumed that Johnston, Bragg's superior, would find the situation wanting and take command of the army in the field, easing Bragg aside. However, Johnston arrived on the scene and found the men of the Army of Tennessee in relatively good condition. He told Bragg he had "the best organized, armed, equipped, and disciplined army in the Confederacy." Johnston explicitly refused any suggestion that he take command, concerned that people would think he had taken advantage of the situation for his own personal gain. When Davis ordered Johnston to send Bragg to Richmond, Johnston delayed because of Elise Bragg's illness; when her health improved, Johnston could not assume command because of lingering medical problems from his wound at the Battle of Seven Pines in 1862.

==== Tullahoma campaign ====
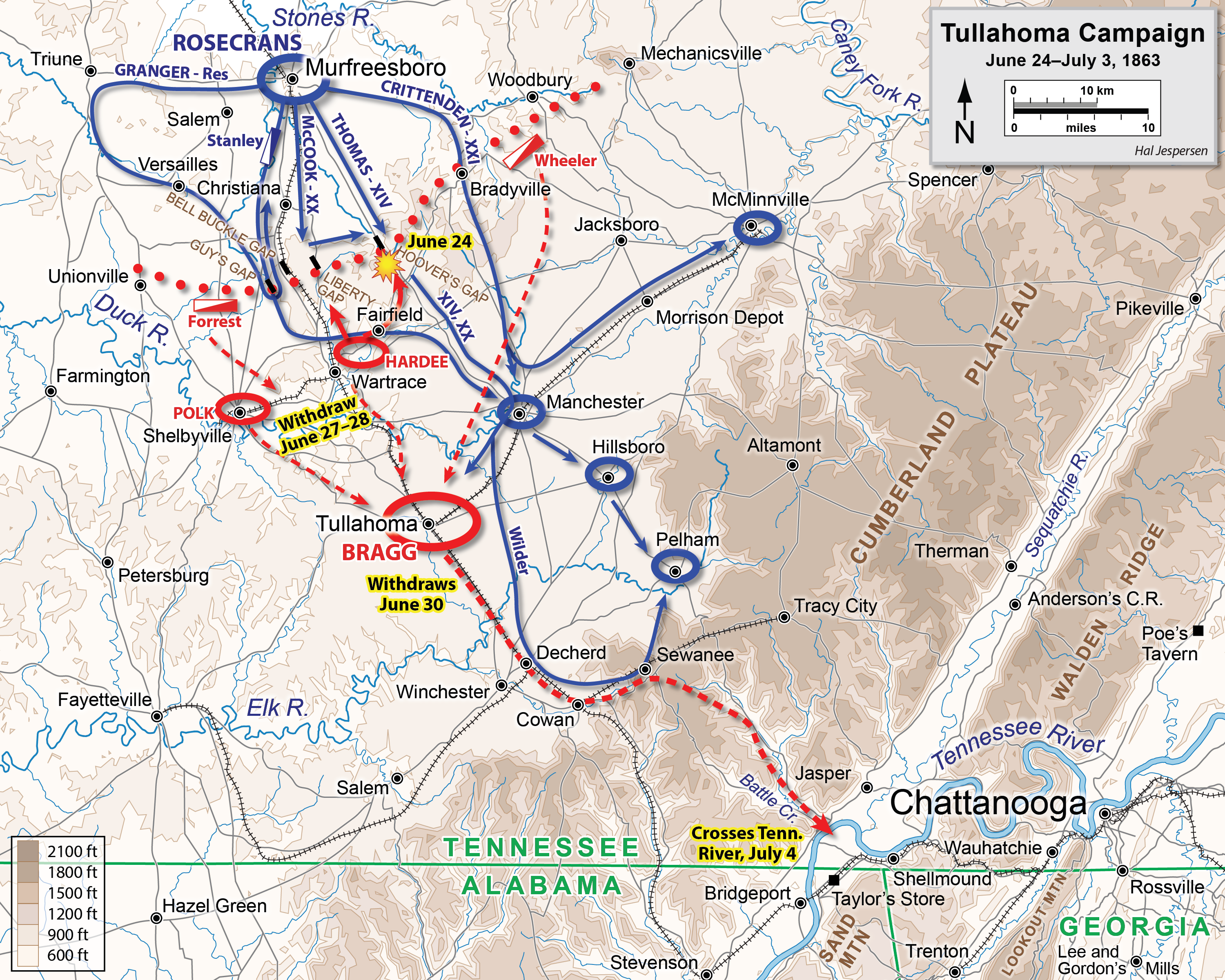
Tullahoma campaign

As Bragg's army fortified Tullahoma, Rosecrans spent the next six months in Murfreesboro, resupplying and retraining his army to resume its advance. Rosecrans's initial movements on June 23, 1863, surprised Bragg. While keeping Polk's corps occupied with small actions in the center of the Confederate line, Rosecrans sent the majority of his army around Bragg's right flank. Bragg was slow to react, and his subordinates were typically uncooperative: the mistrust among the Army of Tennessee general officers for the past months led to little direct communication about strategy, and neither Polk nor Hardee had a firm understanding of Bragg's plans. As the Union army outmaneuvered the Confederates, Bragg was forced to abandon Tullahoma and, on July 4, retreated behind the Tennessee River. Tullahoma is recognized as a "brilliant" campaign for Rosecrans, achieving his goal of driving Bragg from Middle Tennessee with minimal losses. Judith Hallock wrote that Bragg was "outfoxed" and that his ill health may have been partially to blame for his performance. Still, her overall assessment was that he performed credibly during the retreat from Tullahoma, keeping his army intact under difficult circumstances.

Although the Army of Tennessee had about 52,000 men at the end of July, the Confederate government merged the Department of East Tennessee, under Maj. Gen. Simon B. Buckner, into Bragg's Department of Tennessee, which added 17,800 men to Bragg's army, but also extended his command responsibilities northward to the Knoxville area. This brought a third subordinate into Bragg's command who had little or no respect for him. Buckner's attitude was colored by Bragg's unsuccessful invasion of Buckner's native Kentucky in 1862 and by the loss of his command through the merger. A positive aspect for Bragg was Hardee's request to be transferred to Mississippi in July, but he was replaced by Lt. Gen. Daniel Harvey Hill, a general who had not gotten along with Robert E. Lee in Virginia.

In early August, the Confederate War Department asked Bragg if he could assume the offensive against Rosecrans if he were given reinforcements from Mississippi. He demurred, concerned about the daunting geographical obstacles and logistical challenges, preferring to wait for Rosecrans to solve those same problems and attack him. An opposed crossing of the Tennessee River was not feasible, so Rosecrans devised a deception to distract Bragg above Chattanooga while the army crossed downstream. Bragg was rightly concerned about a sizable Union force under Maj. Gen. Ambrose E. Burnside that was threatening Knoxville to the northeast, and Rosecrans reinforced this concern by feinting to his left and shelling the city of Chattanooga from the heights north of the river. The bulk of the Union army crossed the Tennessee southeast of Chattanooga by September 4, and Bragg realized that his position there was no longer tenable. He evacuated the city on September 8.

==== Battle of Chickamauga ====
Initial movements in the Chickamauga campaign, August 15 – September 8, 1863

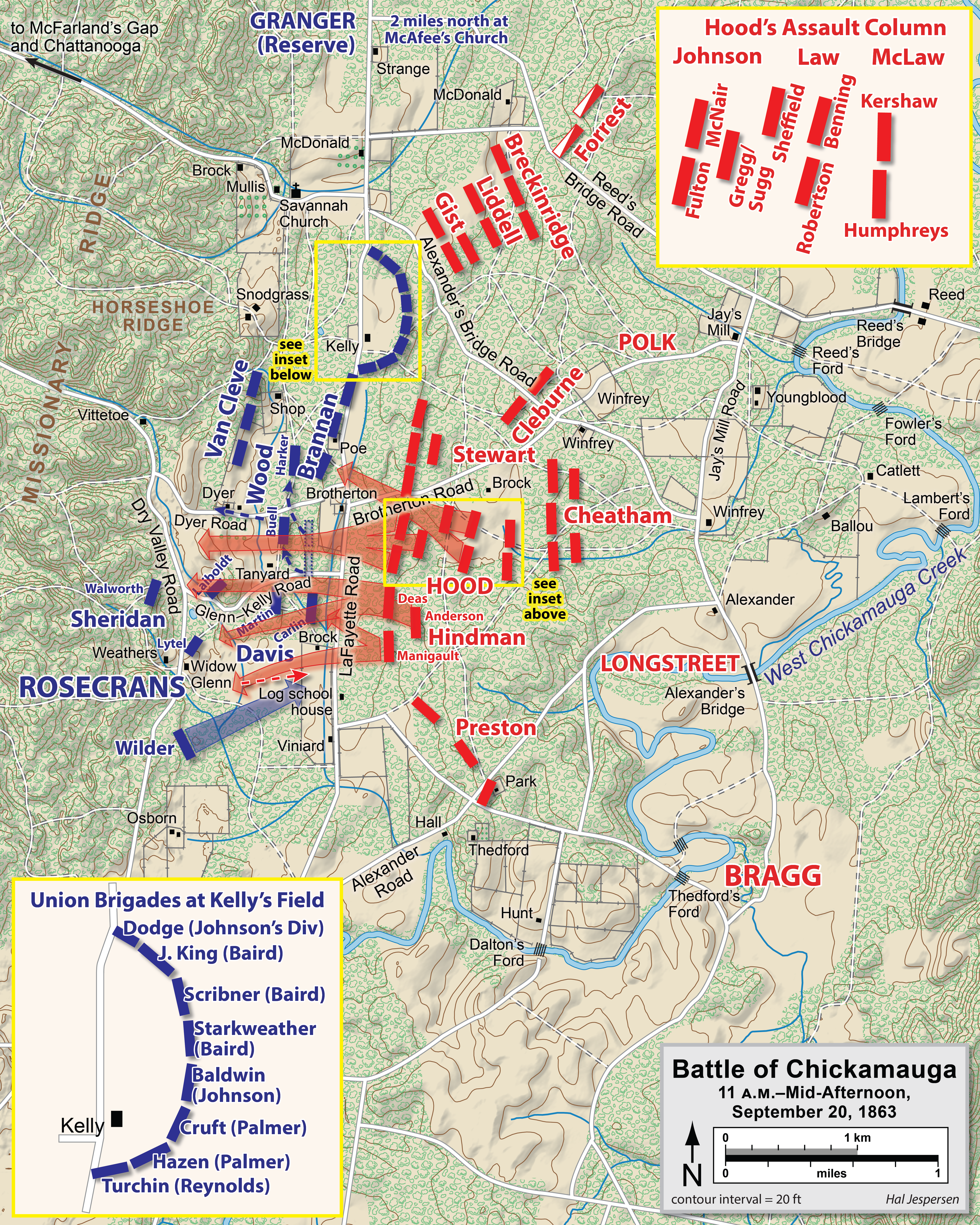
Longstreet's breakthrough at the Battle of Chickamauga, mid-day September 20

After Rosecrans had consolidated his gains and secured his hold in Chattanooga, he began moving his army into northern Georgia in pursuit of Bragg. Bragg continued to suffer from the conduct of his subordinates, who were not attentive to his orders. On September 10, Maj. Gens. Thomas C. Hindman and Daniel Harvey Hill refused to attack, as ordered, an outnumbered Federal column at McLemore's Cove (the Battle of Davis's Cross Roads). On September 13, Bragg ordered Leonidas Polk to attack Maj. Gen. Thomas L. Crittenden's corps, but Polk ignored the orders and demanded more troops, insisting that it was he who was about to be attacked. Rosecrans used the time lost in these delays to concentrate his scattered forces. Finally, on September 19–20, 1863, Bragg, reinforced by two divisions from Mississippi, one division and several brigades from the Department of East Tennessee, and two divisions under Lt. Gen. James Longstreet from Robert E. Lee's Army of Northern Virginia, turned on the pursuing Rosecrans in northeastern Georgia and at high cost defeated him at the Battle of Chickamauga, the greatest Confederate victory in the western theater during the war. It was not a complete victory, however. Bragg aimed to cut off Rosecrans from Chattanooga and destroy his army. Instead, following a partial rout of the Union army by Longstreet's wing, a stout defense by Maj. Gen. George H. Thomas allowed Rosecrans and almost all of his army to escape. The success also came with an enormous cost. Bragg's army suffered 18,450 casualties, making this the costliest Confederate victory of the entire war.

After the battle, Rosecrans's Army of the Cumberland retreated to Chattanooga, where Bragg laid siege to the city. He began to wage a battle against the subordinates he resented for failing him in the campaign—Hindman for his lack of action in McLemore's Cove and Polk for delaying the morning attack Bragg ordered on September 20. On September 29, Bragg suspended both officers from their commands. In early October, an attempted mutiny of Bragg's subordinates resulted in D. H. Hill being relieved from his command. Longstreet was dispatched with his corps to the Knoxville campaign against Ambrose Burnside, seriously weakening Bragg's army at Chattanooga.

Some of Bragg's subordinate generals were frustrated at what they perceived to be his lack of willingness to exploit the victory by pursuing the Union army toward Chattanooga and destroying it. Polk, in particular, was outraged at being relieved of command. The dissidents, including many division and corps commanders, met secretly and prepared a petition to President Jefferson Davis. Although the petition's author is unknown, historians suspect it was Simon Buckner, whose signature was first on the list. Lt. Gen. James Longstreet wrote to the secretary of war with the prediction that "nothing but the hand of God can save us or help us as long as we have our present commander." With the Army of Tennessee literally on the verge of mutiny, Jefferson Davis reluctantly traveled to Chattanooga to assess the situation and try to stem the tide of dissent in the army. Although Bragg offered to resign to resolve the crisis, Davis eventually decided to leave Bragg in command, denounced the other generals, and termed their complaints "shafts of malice".

==== Battles for Chattanooga ====
Battles for Chattanooga, November 24–25, 1863

While Bragg fought with his subordinates and reduced his force by dispatching Longstreet to Knoxville, the besieged Union army received a new commander—Maj. Gen. Ulysses S. Grant—and significant reinforcements from Mississippi and Virginia. The Battles for Chattanooga marked Bragg's final days as an army commander. His weakened left flank (previously manned by Longstreet's troops) fell on November 24 during the Battle of Lookout Mountain. The following day in the Battle of Missionary Ridge, his primary defensive line successfully resisted an attack on its right flank. Still, the center was overwhelmed in a frontal assault by George Thomas's army. The Army of Tennessee was routed and retreated to Dalton, Georgia. Bragg offered his resignation on November 29 and was chagrined when Davis accepted it immediately. He turned over temporary command to Hardee on December 2 and was replaced with Joseph E. Johnston, who commanded the army in the 1864 Atlanta campaign against William T. Sherman.

==== Advisor to the President ====
Davis relied heavily upon Bragg's understanding of military affairs and institutions. Although he did not always agree with Bragg, Davis consistently sought his expertise and opinion on a variety of matters. By untiringly assuming many of the duties and much of the criticism that had burdened and perplexed Davis, Bragg eased some of the president's vexations. In the process he maintained old enmities and created many new ones.

— Judith Lee Hallock, Braxton Bragg and Confederate Defeat, Volume II

In February 1864, Bragg was summoned to Richmond for consultation with Davis. The orders for his new assignment on February 24 read that he was "charged with the conduct of military operations of the Confederate States", but he was essentially Davis's military adviser or chief of staff without a direct command, a post once held by Robert E. Lee. Bragg used his organizational abilities to reduce corruption and improve the supply system. He took over responsibility for administrating the military prison system and its hospitals. He reshaped the Confederacy's conscription process by streamlining the chain of command and reducing conscripts' avenues of appeal. During his tenure in Richmond, he had numerous quarrels with significant figures, including the secretary of war, the commissary general, members of Congress, the press, and many of his fellow generals; the exception to the latter was Robert E. Lee, who treated Bragg politely and with deference and who had, Bragg knew, an exceptionally close relationship with the president.

In May, while Lee was defending against Ulysses S. Grant's Overland Campaign in Virginia, Bragg focused on defending areas south and west of Richmond. He convinced Jefferson Davis to appoint P.G.T. Beauregard to an important role in defense of Richmond and Petersburg. Meanwhile, Davis was concerned that Joseph Johnston, Bragg's successor in the Army of Tennessee, was defending too timidly against Sherman's Atlanta campaign. He sent Bragg to Georgia on July 9, charged with investigating the tactical situation and evaluating the replacement of Johnston in command. Bragg harbored the hope that he might be chosen to return to command of the army but was willing to support Davis's choice. Davis had hinted to Bragg that he thought Hardee would be an appropriate successor. Still, Bragg was reluctant to promote an old enemy and reported that Hardee would provide no change in strategy from Johnston's. Bragg had extensive conversations with a more junior corps commander, Lt. Gen. John Bell Hood, and was impressed with his plans for taking offensive action, about which Hood had also been confidentially corresponding to Richmond for weeks behind Johnston's back. Davis chose Hood to replace Johnston.

==== Operations in North Carolina ====
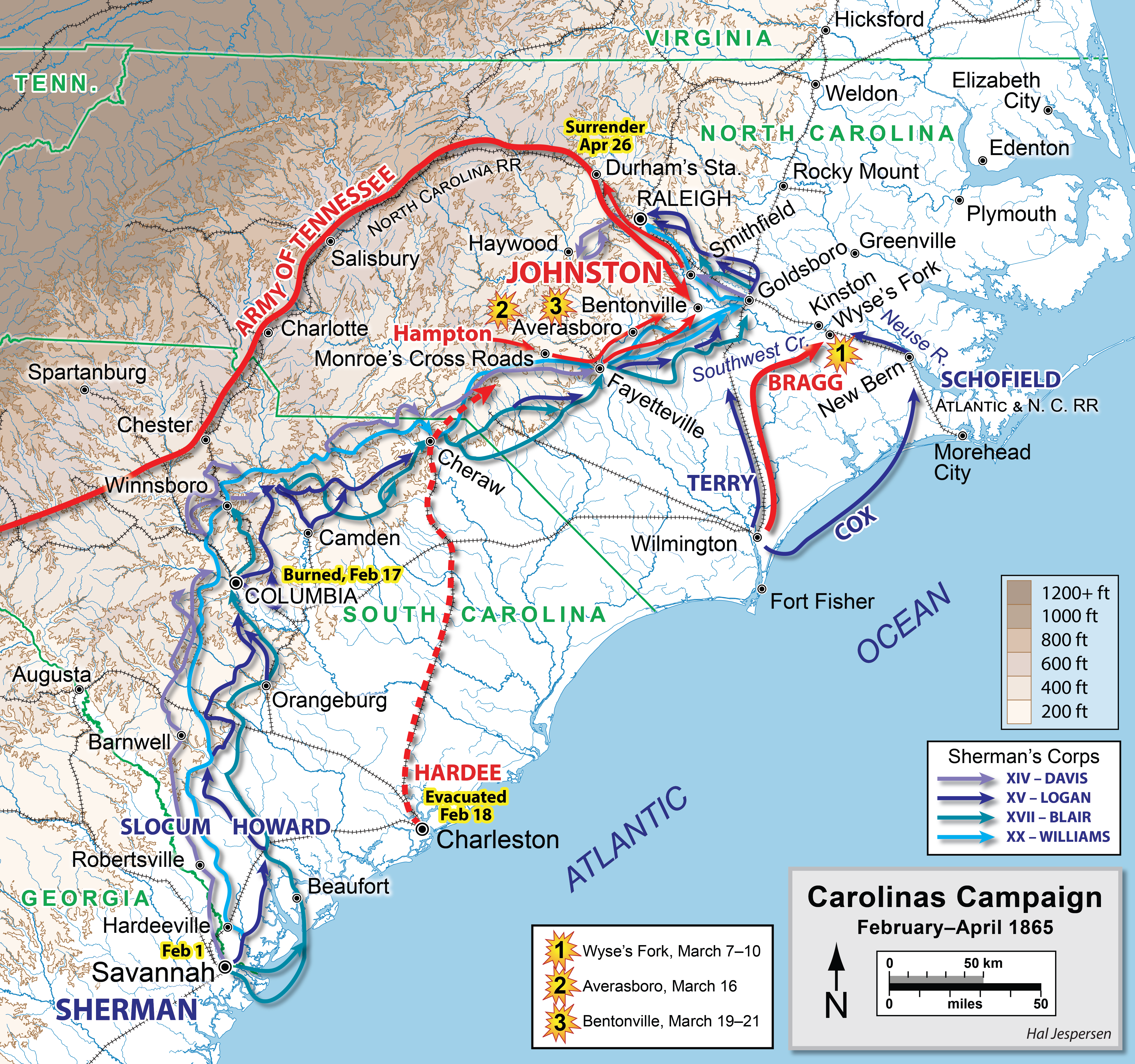
Carolinas campaign

In October 1864, President Davis sent Bragg to assume temporary command of the defenses of Wilmington, North Carolina. His responsibility was soon increased at the recommendation of Robert E. Lee to include all of the Department of North Carolina and Southern Virginia. In November, with William T. Sherman's March to the Sea underway, Davis ordered him to the defenses of Augusta, Georgia, and then to Savannah, Georgia; Charleston, South Carolina; and in January 1865, the defenses of Wilmington again. The Confederates successfully repulsed the first Union attempt to capture Fort Fisher, which dominated the seaborne supply line to Wilmington. However, Bragg's performance in the Second Battle of Fort Fisher was poor when the Union returned in January. He assumed that the first failed siege meant the fort was invulnerable, but poor communication and planning from the U.S. forces had played a large role. Thus, he did not come to the fort's assistance after it was attacked the second time. In February, the Confederates were forced to evacuate Wilmington, their last remaining seaport on the Atlantic coast. The local population subsequently blamed him for the loss of the city.

Bragg's now-fragile military career began to crumble around him. To his disgust, Joseph E. Johnston returned to service to command the remnants of the Army of Tennessee and other forces defending against Sherman in North Carolina. At about the same time, Bragg lost his position as military adviser to Davis when Robert E. Lee was promoted to be general in chief of all the Confederate armies in February, and John C. Breckinridge, who had hated Bragg since the debacle at Perryville, was named Secretary of War. Davis was sympathetic to Bragg's discomfort and discussed transferring him to command the Trans-Mississippi Department, replacing Edmund Kirby Smith, but the politicians from that region were vehemently opposed. Bragg became, in effect, a corps commander (although his command was less than a division in size) under Johnston for the remainder of the Carolinas campaign. His men were able to win a minor victory at the Second Battle of Kinston, March 7–10, and fought unsuccessfully at the Battle of Bentonville, March 19–21. After the fall of Richmond on April 2, Jefferson Davis and remnants of the Confederate government fled to the southwest. Bragg, who had been headquartered at Raleigh, North Carolina, caught up with Davis near Abbeville, South Carolina, on May 1. He attended the final cabinet meeting and convinced Davis that the cause was lost. Bragg and a small party of his staff rode to the west and were captured and paroled in Monticello, Georgia, on May 9.

== Later life and death ==
Bragg and his wife Eliza had lost their home in late 1862 when the United States Army confiscated the plantation in Thibodaux. It briefly served as a shelter, the Bragg Home Colony, for freed people under the control of the Freedmen's Bureau. The couple moved in with his brother, a plantation owner in Lowndesboro, Alabama, but they found the life of seclusion there intolerable. In 1867 Bragg became the superintendent of the New Orleans waterworks, but a formerly enslaved African-American man soon replaced him as the Reconstructionists came to power. In late 1869 Jefferson Davis offered Bragg a job as an agent for the Carolina Life Insurance Company. He worked there for four months before becoming dissatisfied with the profession and its low pay. He considered but rejected a position in the Egyptian Army. In August 1871, he was employed by the city of Mobile, Alabama, to improve the river, harbor, and bay, leaving after quarreling with a "combination of capitalists." Moving to Texas, he was appointed the chief engineer of the Gulf, Colorado and Santa Fe Railway in July 1874. Still, within a year, disagreements with the board of directors over his compensation caused him to resign. He remained in Texas as an inspector of railroads.

On September 27, 1876, at the age of 59, Bragg was walking down a street with a friend in Galveston, Texas, when he suddenly fell over unconscious. Dragged into a drugstore, he was dead within 10 to 15 minutes. A physician familiar with his history believed that he "died by the brain" (or of "paralysis of the brain"), suffering from the degeneration of cerebral blood vessels. An inquest ruled that his death was due to "fatal syncope" possibly induced by organic disease of the heart. He is buried in Magnolia Cemetery, Mobile, Alabama.

== Personal life ==
On his celebratory tour, Bragg visited Evergreen Plantation in Wallace, Louisiana, where he met 23-year-old Eliza Brooks Ellis, known to her friends as Elise, a wealthy sugar heiress. They were married on June 7, 1849, in the drawing room of Magnolia Manor, the Ellis plantation. The newlyweds relocated to Jefferson Barracks, Missouri, on September 10. They were forced to leave this relatively comfortable assignment in October 1853 when they were transferred to Fort Gibson in the Indian Territory (present-day Oklahoma). Eight months later, they were transferred to Fort Washita, near the Texas border. The primitive conditions at these forts were unsuitable for the married couple, and after another six months, Bragg requested leave, and the couple returned to Thibodaux. Bragg traveled to Washington to implore Secretary of War Jefferson Davis to reassign his artillery battery away from frontier duty, but was unsuccessful.

In June 1863, Bragg received religious instruction and was baptized into the Episcopal Church in Shelbyville, Tennessee.

== Historical reputation ==
James M. McPherson's reference to "the bumblers like Bragg and Pemberton and Hood who lost the West" sums up the judgment of many modern historians. Bragg's shortcomings as an army commander included his unimaginative tactics, mostly his reliance on frontal assault (such as the Hornet's Nest at Shiloh, Breckinridge's assault at Stones River, and numerous instances at Chickamauga), and his lack of post-battle follow-up that turned tactical victories or draws into strategic disappointments (Perryville and Chickamauga). His sour disposition, a penchant for blaming others for defeat, and poor interpersonal skills undoubtedly caused him to be criticized more directly than many of his unsuccessful contemporaries. Peter Cozzens wrote about his relationship with subordinates:

Even Bragg's staunchest supporters admonished him for his quick temper, general irritability, and tendency to wound innocent men with barbs thrown during his frequent fits of anger. His reluctance to praise or flatter was exceeded, we are told, only by the tenacity with which, once formed, he clung to an adverse impression of a subordinate. For such officers—and they were many in the Army of Mississippi—Bragg's removal or their transfer were the only alternatives to an unbearable existence.

— Peter Cozzens, No Better Place to Die: The Battle of Stones River

One private, Sam Watkins, who later became a professional writer, said in his memoirs that "None of Bragg's men soldiers ever loved him. They had no faith in his ability as a general. He was looked upon as a merciless tyrant ... He loved to crush the spirit of the men." Historian Ty Seidule says that Bragg's battles often ended in defeat because of his insistence on direct frontal assaults and his "uncanny ability to turn minor wins and losses into strategic defeats."

Some counterarguments have emerged in recent years. Judith Lee Hallock called the blaming of Bragg for Confederate defeats in the West "Bragg syndrome." While most agree he was not a particularly good army commander, historians such as Hallock and Steven E. Woodworth cite his skills as an organizer and argue that his defeat in several battles can also be partially blamed upon bad luck and incompetent subordinates, notably Polk. Of his troublesome subordinates, Hardee was considered a solid soldier even by Bragg. Although personally brave and charismatic, Polk was simply an average tactician known for piecemeal attacks and was seriously insubordinate. However, he was a close friend of Davis, who was unwilling to relieve him. Woodworth claims that Bragg also never received the support Davis gave to Robert E. Lee and Sidney Johnston.

Historians Grady McWhiney and Woodworth have stated that, contrary to popular belief, Davis and Bragg were not friends, having bitterly quarreled during the antebellum years. Davis was impressed with Bragg's qualifications for high command early in the war but was willing to relieve him by 1863. Judith Hallock noted mutual admiration between Davis and Bragg during his assignment in Richmond, perhaps because Bragg respected the president. Post-Civil War, Bragg's relationship with Davis grew stronger. He regularly addressed his letters to Davis as "Your Friend" and worked with Davis in the Carolina Insurance Company. Additionally, Bragg earned the infamous sobriquet “the most hated man of the Confederacy” during the Civil War, a reflection of his contentious relationships with both subordinates and fellow officers, his strict enforcement of discipline, and the high casualty rates under his command. These contemporaneous characterizations are documented in both wartime accounts and postwar historical analyses, including the work of biographer Earl J. Hess and contemporaneous testimony from Confederate officers.

== Legacy ==
The following places in the United States are or were named for Bragg:

- Bragg, Texas – ghost town founded in 1902 and disappeared by the 1930s
- Fort Bragg, California – city founded in 1857 and named by Horatio Gates Gibson in honor of Bragg's exploits in the Mexican–American War prior to the Civil War
- Fort Bragg – a military post in North Carolina, founded in 1918 as Camp Bragg (later Fort Bragg), which was renamed Fort Liberty in 2023, and again renamed Fort Bragg (in honor of Roland L. Bragg) in 2025

== See also ==
- List of American Civil War generals
- List of people from North Carolina
- List of United States Military Academy alumni
