= Votaw, Texas =

Unincorporated community in Texas, US

Coordinates: 30°26′08″N 94°40′24″W

Votaw is an unincorporated community in northwestern Hardin County, Texas, United States. It is part of the Beaumont–Port Arthur Metropolitan Statistical Area.

The community was named for Clark M. Votaw, assistant land commissioner of the Kirby Lumber Company and vice president of the Santa Fe Townsite Company, which laid out the town lots.

The West Hardin County Consolidated Independent School District serves area students.
