= Bragg, Texas =

Human settlement in Texas, United States of America

Coordinates: 30°25′09″N 94°33′52″W

Bragg is a ghost town in Hardin County, Texas, United States, in the Big Thicket forest area of the southeastern part of the state. Sometimes referred to as "Bragg Station", this small community that flourished in the early 1900s lies 10 miles west of Kountze.

Named after Confederate general Braxton Bragg, this town was built around an important railroad junction installed by the Santa Fe Railroad system in 1902. The railroad line transported lumber and other supplies servicing the oil industry near Beaumont.

Several years later, the local industry began to shift its shipping lanes and abandon the railroad. The local post office that had served the railroad and oilfield workers was closed in 1914. In addition to the relocation of oilfield workers into other communities, the rail line extending from Bragg Station south to the small community of Saratoga was dismantled in 1934.

Today, all that remains of Bragg Station is a small agricultural community and a locally famous dirt road that has been designated a scenic drive county park. The Ghost Road leading south to Saratoga is the center of a local legend of a ghost light called the Light of Saratoga.

== See also ==
- List of ghost towns in Texas
- List of ghost towns in the United States
