= Maco light =

Mysterious light in North Carolina

The Maco Light was a supposedly anomalous light, or "ghost light", occasionally seen between the late 19th century and 1977 along a section of railroad track near the unincorporated community of Maco Station in Brunswick County, North Carolina. Said to resemble the glow from a railroad lantern, the light was associated with a folk tale describing a fatal accident, which may have inspired tales of a similar type around the country.

The light was never formally explained, but was often thought to be the result of marsh gas from nearby swamps or the refraction of lights from a highway.

== Legend ==
The tale associated the light with Joe Baldwin, a train conductor who was said to have been decapitated in a collision between a runaway passenger car or caboose and a locomotive at Maco, along the Wilmington and Manchester Railroad, in the late 1800s.

According to the most common version of the legend, Joe Baldwin was in the rear car of a Wilmington-bound train on a rainy night in 1867. As the train neared Maco, Baldwin realized the car had become detached from the rest of the train. He knew another train was following, so he ran to the rear platform and frantically waved a lantern to signal the oncoming train. The engineer failed to see the stranded railroad car in time, and Baldwin was decapitated in the collision. Some variants of the story added that Baldwin's head was never found.

Shortly after the accident, residents of Maco and railroad employees reported sightings of a white light along a section of railroad track through swamps west of Maco station, and word spread that Joe Baldwin had returned to search for his missing head. The light was said to appear in the distance, before approaching along the tracks facing East, bobbing at a height of about 5 feet (1.5 m), and either flying to the side of the track in an arc or receding from the viewer. Other reports spoke of green or red lights, or other patterns of movement. The earliest stories supposedly dated from the 1870s, and until the 1886 Charleston earthquake, two lights were often reported: railroad employees said that trains had occasionally been stopped or delayed due to the activities of the light, which had even been seen from locomotive cabs. The journal Railroad Telegrapher, for example, reported in 1946 that the light had been seen on March 3 that year, and suggested it had been appearing for some seventy years previously. One commonly cited aspect of the legend, that the light was discussed with President Cleveland when his train was stopped at Maco in 1889, seems to have originated with Atlantic Coast Line employee B. M. Jones, who claimed to have been present at the visit as a young child. Another early account of the Joe Baldwin legend was given by Robert Scott, editor of the Atlantic Coast Line News, to the journal Railway Age in 1932. Similar "headless brakeman" stories have been found associated with other "ghost lights" in the United States, such as the Bragg Road ghost light and Gurdon light: from a folklore perspective the story connected with the Maco light, being substantially the oldest and best-known and having received some national coverage, may have served as the point of origin for the others.

== Popularity and investigation ==
The legend became widely known across the region, and the site was frequented by curiosity seekers and those looking to explain the light, including a team of electronics engineers (two from radio station WWOK, one from WKIX and one from Bell Laboratories) in July 1962. In the 1950s and 60s it became a common local pastime to park by the tracks at night to try and glimpse the phenomenon; Life magazine even devoted a two-page article to the light in an October 1957 issue. Photographers from the Wilmington Star-News attempted to photograph the light in 1946 and 1955, claiming partial success. Joseph Dunninger visited Maco in 1957, without managing to see the light, and a 1964 investigation by paranormal researcher Hans Holzer led to the latter concluding (despite failing to see the phenomenon himself) that Baldwin "did not realize" he was dead, and was still warning oncoming trains of disconnected rail cars. More prosaic explanations were put forward by locals, such as phosphorescent gas from the swamp or reflected car headlights, or that the light had appeared regularly until 1935, when the railroad filled in the swamp under a trestle, but that since then only automobile headlights had been seen.

A search of newspaper records for the Wilmington Railroad Museum discovered that although there was no record of an 1867 accident or of a Joe Baldwin, a conductor called Charles Baldwin had been killed in an incident in January 1856 close to the later site of Maco station. The accident had occurred when a locomotive, returning to its previously decoupled train after leaving it at a station while it went to work out technical problems, ran into it. Baldwin was thrown clear (although not decapitated) and later died from his injuries. The coroner's report laid the blame on Baldwin for failing to hang a lamp on the train to alert the engineer. Garbled memories of the death of Charles Baldwin (who was locally well-liked, as indicated by his contemporary obituary in the Wilmington Journal) might explain the later story of "Joe Baldwin", if not the light itself.

== Modern times ==
A 1972 article in the Wilmington Star-News argued that "most investigators" had believed the light was traceable to refraction from car headlights on a nearby highway, U.S. Route 74. Reprinting a 1950 long-exposure photograph of the light, the newspaper stated that a bend on the highway was the cause of the phenomenon, noting both that amber and red lights had been seen close to the main light when viewed through a telescope (corresponding to truck turn and brake signals) and that the light had been rarely seen since highway widening in the late 1960s eliminated the bend. Refuting the stories of some locals, who claimed that the light had still appeared while the highway was closed for a period during World War II, the Star-News researcher noted that a thorough check of archives twenty years earlier to verify this part of the tale had failed to reveal any evidence of such a closure taking place. The newspaper was the scene of a good deal of discussion on the subject, with one resident writing that "the Maco Light is what [the Star-News] says it is [...] all the Maco Light is now is just a lovers' lane and a place to start a lot of trouble". However, the light retained some supporters: in the mid 1970s a reporter for The Robesonian was eventually, after several failed attempts, able to see the light, which he described as "chilling" and "resembling the light thrown from a kerosene lantern as seen from a distance of about 50 feet [...] primarily white light with an ever so little reddish tint. It tended to travel down the center of the track, swinging to and fro with slight vertical undulations".

Author Bland Simpson, interviewed on North Carolina Public Radio in 2005, called the Maco Light "one of [his] favorite" North Carolina legends, describing his own sighting of it as "like a match, the light in a kerosene lantern [...] what the source of it was I'll never know".

Sightings of the light ended when the railroad removed the track in 1977 and a trestle bridge related to the legend was destroyed. A street in a nearby subdivision bears the name Joe Baldwin Drive.

== See also ==
- Gurdon light
- Paulding Light
- The Spooklight
