= Thicket, Texas =

Unincorporated community in Texas, US

Coordinates: 30°23′45″N 94°37′49″W

Thicket is an unincorporated community in northwestern Hardin County, Texas, United States. It is part of the Beaumont–Port Arthur metropolitan statistical area.

== Education ==
The West Hardin County Consolidated Independent School District serves area students.
