= Batson, Texas =

Unincorporated community in Texas, United States

Coordinates: 30°14′58″N 94°36′26″W

Location of Batson

Batson is an unincorporated community in southwestern Hardin County, Texas, United States. It is located on State Highway 105 and is part of the Beaumont–Port Arthur Metropolitan Statistical Area.

== Education ==
The West Hardin County Consolidated Independent School District serves area students.

== History ==
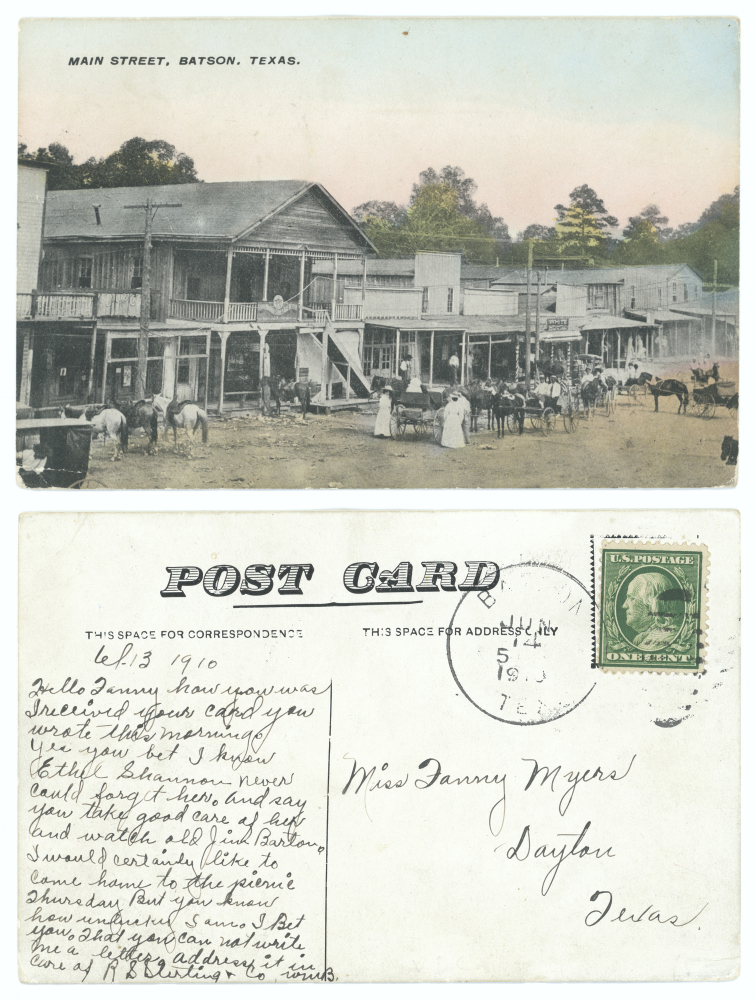
Main Street, circa 1910.

This community was originally settled by the Batson family sometime before 1840. In October 1903, an oilfield was discovered to the north of the town, and soon after the population would boom to about 10,000 residents. The oil production would decrease by the mid-1920s, resulting in the population decline to about 600. In March 1935, another oil discovery would boost the population slightly, but over the next several decades, would decline again.
