= Saratoga, Texas =

Unincorporated community in Texas, US

- Unincorporated community
- Nickname: Birthplace of George Jones
- Location within Texas Location within the United States
- Coordinates: 30°17′03″N 94°31′46″W
- Country: United States
- State: Texas
- Counties: Hardin
- Elevation: 89 ft (27 m)
- Time zone: CST
  - Summer (DST): CDT
- GNIS feature ID: 1346698

Saratoga is an unincorporated community in Hardin County, Texas, United States. It is located about 26 miles (42 km) northwest of Beaumont and adjacent to the Big Thicket National Preserve. The ZIP code is 77585. Saratoga is part of the Beaumont–Port Arthur metropolitan statistical area.

== History ==
The original name for this community was New Sour Lake. The first significant landmark discovery of this area was the sulfur-smelling spring by J. F. Cotton in the 1850s. As late as 1865, he tried to establish an oil well on the site, but failed due to inadequate machinery.

In the 1880s, P. S. Watts wanted to profit from the spring using the unique "medicinal" properties of the water (a popular trend at the time). To draw would-be visitors to the site, Watts changed the name of the site to "Saratoga" to replicate the famous resort at Saratoga Springs, New York. He built a hotel and rental cottages for potential customers, but only a few came.

Years later, with the success of the Lucas Gusher within Spindletop at Beaumont, the first profitable wells were drilled at Saratoga. In 1904, an extension of the Gulf, Colorado and Santa Fe Railway was built from Saratoga to Bragg Station.

== Notable people ==
- George Jones (1931–2013), country musician
- Joseph Warren Sheehy (1910–1967), judge
