= Mound City, Texas =

- Unincorporated community
- Location within Texas Location within the United States
- Coordinates: 31°34′37″N 95°24′23″W
- Country: United States
- State: Texas
- County: Anderson, Houston
- Elevation: 486 ft (148 m)
- Time zone: UTC-6 (Central (CST))
  - Summer (DST): UTC-5 (CDT)
- Area codes: 430 & 903
- GNIS feature ID: 2034775

Mound City, also known as Houston's Mound, is an unincorporated community in Houston and Anderson counties in the U.S. state of Texas. The Anderson County portion of the community is located within the Palestine, Texas micropolitan area.

== History ==
Houston's Mound, as it was known then, was founded in the 1840s and named after an area where the terrain was higher than average. It was a thriving town until World War II; in 1930, Mound City had a general store, church, and a few houses. During the war, many residents were drafted or had to find work in larger cities. The city declined in population. There have been no population estimates since the 1960s when it was reported that a few houses remained.

== Geography ==
It is located on Farm to Market Road 2022 on the Anderson and Houston County line, 2 mi (3.2 km) north of Percilla and about 12 mi (19 km) from Grapeland.

== Education ==
Mound City was never large enough to provide quality education to the pupils, so the students attended school in nearby Percilla. It later consolidated its school to Grapeland Independent School District. Students who live on the Anderson County side of Mound City are within the Slocum Independent School District, so it is presumed that when Percilla consolidated their school, they gave their Anderson County portion to Slocum.
