= Arbor Grove, Texas =

Ghost town in Texas, United States

- Ghost town
- Location within Texas Location within the United States
- Coordinates: 31.295614°N 95.297470°W
- Country: United States
- State: Texas
- County: Houston
- Elevation: 312 ft (95 m)
- Time zone: UTC-6 (Central (CST))
  - Summer (DST): UTC-5 (CDT)
- Area codes: 430 & 903
- GNIS feature ID: 1381333

Arbor Grove, also known as Arbor, is a ghost town in southeastern Houston County, Texas, United States.

== History ==
Arbor Grove was established sometime before 1900. The community had a post office from 1901 to 1906. It had a church and several scattered houses in the mid-1930s. Many residents moved elsewhere after World War II, and the church and scattered houses from the mid-1930s were the only things that remained in the settlement.

Mexican land grants were given to colonists under the leadership of Empresario Joseph Vehlein in this region in the late 1820s and 1830s, but the real growth didn't start until after the Civil War when people relocated here from states torn apart by conflict to profit from the burgeoning cotton and cattle industries. In the 1880s, residents of the nearby communities of Pleasant Grove and Shady Grove built a brush arbor that doubled as a church and school. It also had a general store, barbershop, blacksmith shop, gristmill, cotton gin, Woodman hall, and shingle mill. From 1910 through 1925, the Four C Lumber Mill's and the logging operation's jobs generated a boom in the community's economy. The economy suffered during the Great Depression of the 1930s, but it recovered as a result of projects carried out by the Federal Civilian Conservation Corps (CCC) and Works Progress Administration (WPA), which in the late 1930s gave many locals jobs. Rhodes Chapel Baptist Church, founded in 1897, had 155 members and 89 homes in Arbor in 1941.

== Geography ==
Arbor is located on Farm to Market Road 232 at Chisholm Loop, 10 mi (16 km) east of Crockett in southeastern Houston County.

== Education ==
The Arbor School, founded in 1900, was shut down after a fire in 1940. Today, Arbor Grove is served by the Crockett Independent School District.
