= Mount Vernon, Houston County, Texas =

- Ghost town
- Location within Texas Location within the United States
- Coordinates: 31°24′31″N 95°05′15″W
- Country: United States
- State: Texas
- County: Houston
- Elevation: 351 ft (107 m)
- Time zone: UTC-6 (Central (CST))
  - Summer (DST): UTC-5 (CDT)
- Area code: 936
- GNIS feature ID: 2034826

Mount Vernon is a ghost town in Houston County, Texas, United States.

== History ==
Thomas Jefferson Payne and his wife Nancy Warren Payne established it for the first time in the late 1840s. When the church burned to the ground in 1883, residents quickly built a replacement called Mount Vernon. The community included a church, a cemetery, and many homes by the middle of the 1930s. Many of its population left the area after World War II, although there was still a church, a cemetery, and a few dispersed homes there in the early 1990s.

== Geography ==
Mount Vernon is located on Texas State Highway 7, 4 mi (6.4 km) east of Ratcliff in eastern Houston County.

== Education ==
Henry Warren Payne constructed a school in the 1870s. Around 1883, the structure burned down. Today, the community is served by the Kennard Independent School District.
