= Randolph, Houston County, Texas =

Coordinates: 33°29′02″N 96°15′09″W

Randolph, also known as Old Randolph, was an unincorporated area in Houston County, Texas, United States.

== History ==
Randolph was located on the Old Kennard-Crockett Road (now near at the intersection of Texas State Highway 21 and FM 1733) approximately 12 miles from Crockett and 3 miles (4.8 km) Kennard. It was founded in 1838 by Cyrus Halbert Randolph. By 1860, it had a school, a post office, a saloon, a blacksmith, a barber shop, and a Masonic lodge. During that time, it rivaled Crockett for the county seat, but declined after the Civil War. It was completely abandoned by 1900. Today, only a cemetery remains.

== Education ==
Any students who might live in the area would be zoned in the Kennard Independent School District.
