= Hagerville, Texas =

- Unincorporated community
- Location within Texas Location within the United States
- Coordinates: 31°20′41″N 95°4′53″W
- Country: United States
- State: Texas
- County: Houston
- Elevation: 272 ft (83 m)
- Time zone: UTC-6 (Central (CST))
  - Summer (DST): UTC-5 (CDT)
- Area codes: 430 & 903
- GNIS feature ID: 1381958

Hagerville is an unincorporated community in Houston County, Texas, United States. According to the Handbook of Texas, the community had a population of 70 in 2000.

== Geography ==
Hagerville is located on Hager Creek near Farm to Market Road 357 where FM 4740 and 4700 meet, 6 mi (9.7 km) southeast of Kennard and 16 mi (26 km) southeast of Crockett in southeastern Houston County.

== Education ==
Hagerville had its own school in 1892. Today, the community is served by the Kennard Independent School District.
