= Burrantown, Texas =

- Unincorporated community
- Location within Texas Location within the United States
- Coordinates: 31°29′34″N 95°12′18″W
- Country: United States
- State: Texas
- County: Houston
- Elevation: 361 ft (110 m)
- Time zone: UTC-6 (Central (CST))
  - Summer (DST): UTC-5 (CDT)
- Area codes: 430 & 903
- GNIS feature ID: 1381557

Burrantown is an unincorporated community in Houston County, Texas, United States. According to the Handbook of Texas, the community had a population of 70 in 2000.

== History ==
The area may have been found around 1900.

== Geography ==
Burrantown is located on Farm to Market Road 1733, 20 mi (32 km) northeast of Crockett in eastern Houston County.

== Education ==
Children in Burrantown attended school in either Glover or Weches. Today, the community is served by the Kennard Independent School District.
