= Center Grove, Texas =

- Ghost town
- Location within Texas Location within the United States
- Coordinates: 31°10′03″N 95°23′04″W
- Country: United States
- State: Texas
- County: Houston
- Elevation: 233 ft (71 m)
- Time zone: UTC-6 (Central (CST))
  - Summer (DST): UTC-5 (CDT)
- Area codes: 430 & 903
- GNIS feature ID: 2034897

Center Grove is a ghost town in Houston County, Texas, United States.

== History ==
Center Grove was founded in 1925 through the consolidation of Pine Grove and Center Hill. In the 1930s, Center Grove had a few houses in its vicinity. As of 1990, it still consists of several houses. Its last population estimate was in 1966 when its population was 300.

== Geography ==
It is located on Farm to Market Road 1309, 4 mi (6.4 km) northeast of Lovelady in southern Houston County.

== Education ==
Center Grove had a school in the mid-1930s and 1966. Students now attend Lovelady Independent School District.
