= Allen Chapel, Texas =

- Ghost town
- Location within Texas Location within the United States
- Coordinates: 31°22′21″N 95°09′02″W
- Country: United States
- State: Texas
- County: Houston
- Elevation: 299 ft (91 m)
- Time zone: UTC-6 (Central (CST))
  - Summer (DST): UTC-5 (CDT)
- Area codes: 430 & 903
- GNIS feature ID: 1377451

Allen Chapel is a ghost town in Houston County, Texas, United States.

== History ==
It was settled by recently freed slaves in the 1870s. An African Methodist Episcopal Church was established there around 1900 and was built on Nat Allen's land grant. It was subsequently named for Allen. The church and several scattered houses were in the community in the mid-1930s. These details remained the same in the early 1990s with the addition of a community center. Most of its current settlers are descendants of the original settlers.

== Geography ==
Allen Chapel is located on Texas State Highway 7, one mile south of Ratcliff in eastern Houston County.

== Education ==
The first school in Allen Chapel was established in 1910. It was still standing in the mid-1930s. It joined the Kennard Independent School District in 1968, but the school building returned in 1985.
