= Richard H. Keith =

American businessman (1842–1905)

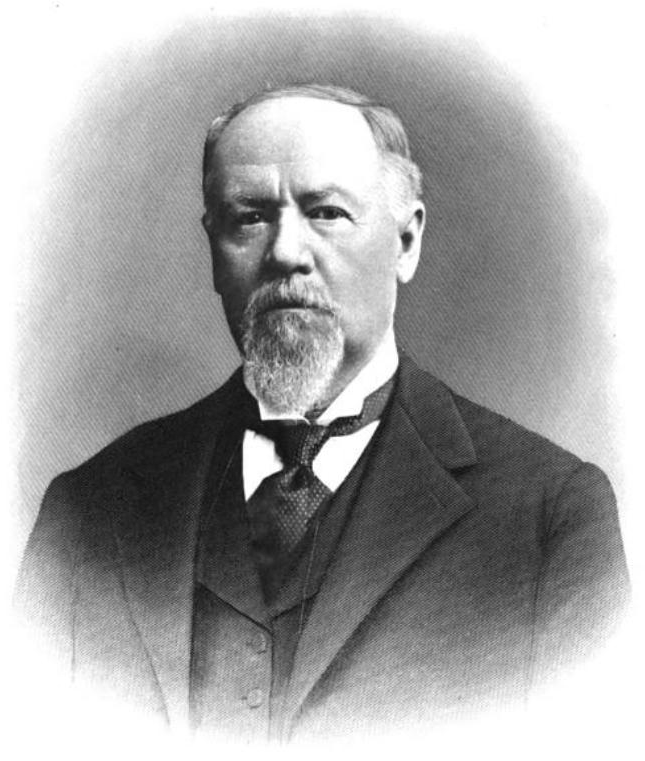
- Born: May 23, 1842; Lexington, Missouri, U.S.
- Died: October 17, 1905 (aged 63); Kansas City, Missouri, U.S.
- Occupations: Co-founder of Keith and Perry Coal Company; Owner of Central Coal and Coke Company
- Known for: Lumber and coal industry; creating and sustaining towns such as Carson, Louisiana, Keith, Louisiana, and Bonanza, Arkansas
- Spouses: Anna Boarman (m. 1871; died 1876) Mary B. Boarman (m. 1876)
- Children: 8, including Charles

Richard H. Keith (May 23, 1842 – October 17, 1905), also known as R. H. Smith, was a coal and lumber businessman. He arrived in Kansas City, Missouri in 1871 with forty dollars and started a small coal yard. From that beginning evolved an empire spanning several states, that included coal, timber, sawmills, railroads, and even the building of towns.

== History ==
Richard H. Keith was born in Lexington, Missouri on May 23, 1842. He attended the Old Masonic College at Lexington until he was 17 years old. After school he worked a year as a deputy clerk and court recorder and then the American Civil War began. He joined the Confederate Army as a private in the 8th Division, under command of Brigadier general James S. Rains, in Lt. Col John Bowman's 2nd Infantry regiment of the Missouri State Guards. Private Keith fought in the Battle of Lexington, Battle of Wilson's Creek, and the Battle of Pea Ridge. He then went to Memphis, joined the Landis battery (John C. Landis) of Missouri and fought in the 1st and 2nd Battle of Corinth, the battles of Iuka, Hatchie River, Grand Gulf, Fort Gibson, Battle of Champion Hills, Black River and the siege of Vicksburg. After being captured in the last battle Keith spent time in Camp Morton, Indiana until he escaped. He went to California, Kansas, and New Mexico before settling in Kansas City.

=== Family ===
Richard's father was Smith Keith and his mother was Margaret née Porter. The family was originally from Fauquier County Virginia. Richard was a descendant of immigrants that came from Scotland in 1642. The Keith's moved to Marion County circa 1839 where Richard was born. In 1844 the family moved to Lafayette County in Lexington, Missouri onto a large plantation. Richard had four siblings, brothers William and Robert eventually owned Keith Furniture and Carpet, in Kansas City, James became a doctor living in Oakland, California, and a sister, Virginia Lee.

Richard Keith married Anna Boarman in 1871 and they had three children, Charles S. that took over the businesses, Dr. Robert L., and Mrs. C.W. Hastings. Anna died in 1876 and he married Mary B. Boarman, Anna's sister and both daughters of Dr. C.S. Boarman, in 1878. They had five children, Anna F. (wife of Henry Koehler), Richard H., Virginia (married Freeman Field), Emily C. (wife of William G. Fairleigh), and Mary Taylor.

=== Business ventures ===
==== Coal ====
In 1871 Keith moved to Kansas City and opened a coal yard, that was reorganized as "Keith and Perry Coal Company, and then as Central Coal and Coke Company.

In 1900 the Poor's Manual of Railroads showed that R. H. Keith, as well as Charles S. Keith (his son and successor), John Perry (partner), and W.C. Perry were involved in the Central Coal and Coke Company, organized April 16, 1893, and succeeded to Keith and Perry Coal Company. There was also the Bowie Lumber Company and Whitaker Tie and Lumber Company of Texarkana, Texas, the Ashdown Lumber Company of Ashdown, Arkansas, and the Missouri Coal and Construction of Kansas City, Missouri.

In 1902 the Central Coal and Coke Company paid $3,000,000 in cash and stock swaps for the Kansas and Texas Coal Company of St. Louis. This catapulted the company to one of the top two of its kind west of Pennsylvania. The purchase combined a company with 45 coal mines on 50,000 acres of land in seven states, 10,000 workers, 23 stores, 2500 company houses, and sawmills producing 180,000,000 board feet of lumber a year.

==== Railroads ====
The coal mines and later timber lands needed transportation to move the commodities. Keith formed the Arkansas and Choctaw Railway on August 31, 1895. The line ran from the Texarkana and Fort Smith Railway at Ashdown, 22 miles to the Arkansas state line west of Arkinda, Arkansas. Richard H. Keith formed a partnership with George A. Madill, a director of the St. Louis–San Francisco Railway ("Frisco"), and John Scullin of the Frisco, forming the Choctaw Construction Company on June 11, 1901, and passing control of the Arkansas and Choctaw Railway to the new company. Under an agreement of July 8, 1902, the company's securities were taken over by the Frisco in 1904 and all property on November 30, 1907. The railroad ran from the Arkansas line (22 miles west of Arkinda) 167 miles to Ardmore, Oklahoma.

The "Houston, East and West Texas Railway", and the Texas Southeastern Railroad (Lufkin to Ratcliff, Texas) are associated with Keith's Texas timber land.

==== Sawmills and towns ====
The company manufactured railroad ties, and lumber in Texarkana, Texas as well as in Keith, Louisiana and by 1905 Central Coal and Coke Company owned a sawmill at Carson, Louisiana. Carson was located south of DeRidder, Louisiana on hwy 27, just north of Singer, and operations began when the timber played out at the Bowie Lumber Company in Texarkana, and equipment was moved to Carson. It is not sure when but Keith, was renamed Neame, and was a large sawmill located on U.S. Highway 171 almost midway between Rosepine and Pickering, Louisiana. The highway and railroad actually runs between the old mill location and mill pond on the east side and the abandoned cemetery on the west side. The Neame cemetery, with turn-of-the-century grave markers, sits in the middle of a large open field, clustered among a circle of trees over-grown and crumbling. As with many sawmill towns when the timber was depleted a ghost town resulted.

Keith began purchasing timber land (120,000 acres) around the Ratcliff, Texas to harvest lumber. The small "Four C" mill was purchased from J.H. Ratcliff on January 10, 1901, and in July was assumed by the Louisiana and Texas Lumber Company. The town of Ratcliff was formed and there was tension between the town merchants and those at the mill. A new mill was set four miles north of Ratcliff and a new "mill town" named Kennard. The new mill began producing 300,000 board feet a day by June 1902. In 1920 the lumber played out, the mill closed, and the town dwindled. Central Coal and Coke Co. also owned a short leaf mill in Conroe, Texas.

A logging town sprang up between Ratcliff and Lufkin called Druso because of the sawmill. Coltharp was already a town but saw a population increase because of the mill.

Richard H. Keith died at his home in Kansas City on October 17, 1905.

== See also ==
- Pea Ridge Confederate order of battle
