= Mapleton, Texas =

- Unincorporated community
- Location within Texas Location within the United States
- Coordinates: 31°08′25″N 95°40′08″W
- Country: United States
- State: Texas
- County: Houston
- Elevation: 200 ft (61 m)
- Time zone: UTC-6 (Central (CST))
  - Summer (DST): UTC-5 (CDT)
- Area code: 936
- GNIS feature ID: 1380138

Mapleton is an unincorporated community in Houston County, Texas, United States. As of 2000, its population was 32, according to the Handbook of Texas.

== History ==
Circa 1924, T. J. Maples and his family founded Mapleton. Because there were so many tree stumps left over after the Maples family cleared the area, the community was once called Stumpville. Stumpville had a chapel, a few shops, and numerous dwellings by the middle of the 1930s. The Maples built a sign identifying the town as Mapleton in 1950. Early in the 1990s, Mapleton was a dispersed rural community with a few shops. Thirty-two people were recorded as living there in 2000.

The small town was damaged by an EF2 tornado on March 21, 2022.

== Geography ==
Mapleton is located on Texas State Highway 21, 18 miles (29 km) southwest of Crockett in southwestern Houston County.

== Education ==
Mapleton is served by the Lovelady Independent School District.
