= Wheeler Springs, Texas =

Unincorporated community in Texas, US

Coordinates: 31°22′37″N 95°38′48″W

Wheeler Springs is an unincorporated community in Houston County, Texas, United States.

== History ==
Wheeler Springs is located on Farm to Market Road 229, approximately 12 miles northwest of Crockett. It is believed to have been founded before 1900. The small community had a school, church, and a few houses. After World War II, the school closed and is now a ghost town, save a few widely scattered houses.

== Education ==
Wheeler Springs is in both the Crockett and Grapeland Independent School Districts.
