= Hopewell, Houston County, Texas =

- Unincorporated community
- Location within Texas Location within the United States
- Coordinates: 31°15′31″N 95°21′43″W
- Country: United States
- State: Texas
- County: Houston
- Elevation: 335 ft (102 m)

Population (2000)
  - Total: 22
- Time zone: UTC-6 (Central (CST))
  - Summer (DST): UTC-5 (CDT)
- GNIS feature ID: 1382023

Hopewell is an unincorporated community in Houston County, Texas, United States. According to the Handbook of Texas, the community had a population of 22 in 2000.

== History ==
Hopewell was established before 1900, but it is unknown who founded it. Hopewell was never more than a church and a few houses at its peak in 1930. Most of the residents moved during World War II, but a few residents remained until the 1990s when it was a dispersed community. Its most recent population estimate was 22, which was taken in 2000.

== Geography ==
Hopewell is located on U.S. Route 287, 8 mi (13 km) northwest of Pennington in east-central Houston County.

== Education ==
Hopewell had its own school in the mid-1960s. Any students presently in Hopewell attend the Crockett Independent School District.
