= Kennard High School =

Location
- 304 SH 7 East; Kennard, Texas 75847-0038; United States; 31.361131°N 95.180004°W

Information
- School type: Public high school
- School district: Kennard Independent School District
- Principal: Stephen Tuggle
- Staff: 22.92 (FTE)
- Grades: K-12
- Enrollment: 267 (2023-2024)
- Student to teacher ratio: 11.65
- Colors: Purple & White
- Athletics conference: UIL Class A
- Mascot: Tiger
- Yearbook: Tiger
- Website: Kennard High School

Kennard High School is a public high school located in Kennard, Texas, United States, and classified as a 1A school by the UIL. It is part of the Kennard Independent School District located in eastern Houston County. In 2015, the school was rated "Met Standard" by the Texas Education Agency.

== Athletics ==
The Kennard Tigers compete in these sports -

Track and Field, Cross Country, Volleyball, Basketball, Tennis, Softball & Baseball

- Baseball
- Basketball
- Cross Country
- Softball
- Tennis
- Track and Field
- Volleyball

=== State Titles ===
- Boys Basketball -
  - 1967(B), 1968(B), 1971(1A), 1973(1A)
- Girls Basketball -
  - 2006(1A/D1)

==== State Finalists ====
- Boys Basketball -
  - 2001(1A/D1), 2026(1A/D2)
- Girls Basketball -
  - 2001(1A/D1), 2005(1A/D1), 2008(1A/D2)
- Volleyball -
  - 1988(1A), 1996(1A)
