= San Pedro, Houston County, Texas =

- Ghost town
- Location within Texas Location within the United States
- Coordinates: 31°28′35″N 95°22′42″W
- Country: United States
- State: Texas
- County: Houston
- Elevation: 381 ft (116 m)
- Time zone: UTC-6 (Central (CST))
  - Summer (DST): UTC-5 (CDT)
- Area code: 936
- GNIS feature ID: 1377447

San Pedro is a ghost town in Houston County, Texas, United States.

== History ==
San Pedro was founded in the 1840s and had a post office from 1848 to 1857 and from 1858 to 1905. A Presbyterian Church was organized in 1889. In the 1930s the community consisted of a church, a cemetery, and several houses. By the 1990s, only the church, cemetery, and scattered houses remained.

== Geography ==
San Pedro is located along San Pedro Creek at the intersection of Farm to Market Road 2022 and Farm to Market Road 2423, 8 miles (13 km) northeast of Crockett.

== Education ==
San Pedro had its own school in 1889 that closed sometime after 1900. Today, the community is served by the Grapeland Independent School District.
