= Weches, Texas =

- Unincorporated community
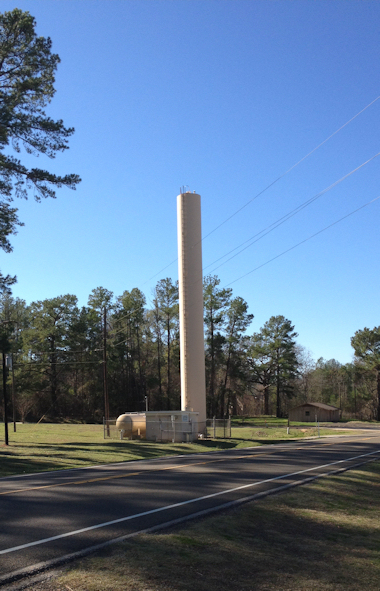
- Weches water tower

- Location within Texas Location within the United States
- Coordinates: 31°32′39″N 95°13′40″W
- Country: United States
- State: Texas
- County: Houston
- Founded: 1847
- Elevation: 456 ft (139 m)

Population (2000)
  - Total: 26
- Time zone: UTC-6 (Central (CST))
  - Summer (DST): UTC-5 (CDT)
- ZIP code: 75844
- Area code: 936
- GNIS feature ID: 1385453

Weches (/ˈwiːtʃɪz/ WEE-chiz) is an unincorporated community in Houston County, Texas, United States. The population was 26 according to the 2000 census.

== History ==
Weches was founded circa 1847 by T. J. Hennin near a large village of Tejas Indians and the San Francisco de los Tejas Mission. Hennin chose to name the settlement Neches after the nearby river. A post office operated under that name from January 1847 to July 1848 and under the name Naches from 1853 until 1882. In 1887, an application was made for a new post office; however, the name Neches had, in the interim, been designated for another town, so the citizens changed the name to Weches. The community had a gristmill, a cotton gin, a general store, a Baptist church, and 100 civilians in 1890. The population soared to 400 in 1896 and added a Methodist and Church of Christ at the turn of the century. It remained successful for the next two decades and began its decline in the early 1930s. By 1936, the population plummeted to 150 and had four businesses. World War II caused most of its inhabitants to move elsewhere and by the early 1970s, the population plunged further to 26 with no businesses and remained at that level through 2000. As of 2010, the population rose to 46.

The first Catholic mission in Texas was founded in Weches by Franciscan Father Damián Massanet in 1690.

In April 2019, an EF3 tornado struck Weches. A large swath of trees was flattened, and an anchored double-wide manufactured home was thrown 150 yd (140 m) and obliterated, killing the occupant.

== Geography ==
Weches is located on Texas State Highway 21 and State Park Road 44 near the Neches River in the San Pedro River valley, about 21 mi (34 km) northeast of Crockett.

== Education ==
Weches is served by both the Kennard Independent School District and the Grapeland Independent School District.
