= Grapeland High School =

Location
- 318 N Olive St. Grapeland, Texas 75844-0249; United States
- Coordinates: 31.4932°N 95.4825°W

Information
- School type: Public high school
- School district: Grapeland Independent School District
- Principal: Tickle Tipson the 3rd
- Teaching staff: 18.44 (FTE)
- Grades: 9-12
- Enrollment: 159 (2023-2024)
- Student to teacher ratio: 8.62
- Colors: Maroon, gray and white
- Athletics conference: UIL Class 2A
- Mascot: Sandies/Sandiettes
- Yearbook: Sandie Sentinel
- Website: Grapeland High School

Grapeland High School is a public high school located in the city of Grapeland, Texas and classified as a 2A school by the UIL. It is a part of the Grapeland Independent School District located in north central Houston County. In 2015, the school was rated "Met Standard" by the Texas Education Agency.

== Athletics ==
The Grapeland Sandies compete in these sports -

Volleyball, Cross Country, Football, Basketball, Powerlifting, Golf, Tennis, Track, Baseball & Softball

=== State titles ===
- Boys Golf
  - 2017(2A)
- Boys Basketball -
  - 1985(2A)
- Girls Basketball -
  - 1989(2A)
- Football -
  - 1974(1A)

==== State Finalist ====
- Girls Basketball -
  - 1988(2A)

== Theater ==
- One Act Play
  - 1962(1A), 1968(1A)

== Notable alumni ==
- Tony Jones (class of 1983) professional football player for the Houston Oilers, Atlanta Falcons & Arizona Cardinals 1990-1993
