= Smith Grove, Texas =

- Ghost town
- Location within Texas Location within the United States
- Coordinates: 31°08′21″N 95°23′08″W
- Country: United States
- State: Texas
- County: Houston
- Elevation: 233 ft (71 m)
- Time zone: UTC-6 (Central (CST))
  - Summer (DST): UTC-5 (CDT)
- Area code: 936
- GNIS feature ID: 1380558

Smith Grove is a rural ghost town in Houston County, Texas, United States.

== History ==
The area in what is known as Smith Grove today was founded sometime before 1900. It had a church, a store, and several scattered houses in the mid-1930s. These details remained the same in the mid-1960s, with another church being built and most of the residents moving elsewhere after World War II. It was declared a dispersed, rural community in the early 1990s.

== Geography ==
Smith Grove is located approximately four miles east of Lovelady at the intersection of FMs 1280 and 1309.

== Education ==
Smith Grove is served by the Lovelady Independent School District.
