= Shady Grove, Houston County, Texas =

- Ghost town
- Location within Texas Location within the United States
- Coordinates: 31°14′03″N 95°19′26″W
- Country: United States
- State: Texas
- County: Houston
- Elevation: 308 ft (94 m)
- Time zone: UTC-6 (Central (CST))
  - Summer (DST): UTC-5 (CDT)
- Area code: 936
- GNIS feature ID: 1382742

Shady Grove is a ghost town in Houston County, Texas, United States.

== History ==
Shady Grove was settled in the 1850s. It soon got a post office but closed in 1866. A Baptist church was built in the mid-1860s and was rebuilt in 1896. In the mid-1930s, the church, a cemetery, and a few houses were in the area. These details remained the same in the mid-1960s, even though World War II caused most of the residents to move away. By the 1990s it was all but abandoned.

== Geography ==
Shady Grove is located on U.S. Highway 287, approximately 10 miles southeast of Crockett in southeastern Houston County.

== Education ==
Most students in Shady Grove attend the Crockett Independent School District. The west side of County Road 4150 is in the Lovelady Independent School District.
