= Porter Springs, Texas =

- Unincorporated community
- Location within Texas Location within the United States
- Coordinates: 31°16′15″N 95°36′33″W
- Country: United States
- State: Texas
- County: Houston
- Elevation: 338 ft (103 m)
- Time zone: UTC-6 (Central (CST))
  - Summer (DST): UTC-5 (CDT)
- Area code: 936
- GNIS feature ID: 1365610

Porter Springs, also known as Porter's Springs, is an unincorporated community in Houston County, Texas, United States. According to the Handbook of Texas, the community had a population of 50 in 2000.

== History ==
Just before the Civil War, Porter Springs became populated. The Bethlehem Baptist Church, the first church, was established before 1877. In 1895, a post office bearing the name of the postmaster, James McIntosh Porter, was created. There were two churches, a general store, a cotton gin, a drugstore, and an estimated fifty people living in Porter Springs by 1896. Porter Springs had three churches and many businesses in the middle of the 1930s; fifty people were reportedly living there in 1936. Up to 1990, the population was listed as fifty. Early in the 1990s, Porter Springs was a dispersed rural town with a few homes, three churches, and a cemetery. In 2000, the population was unchanged.

== Geography ==
Porter Springs is located at the intersection of Farm to Market Roads 2967 and 132, 10 mi (16 km) southwest of Crockett in western Houston County.

== Education ==
The first school in the community was established around 1870. It continued to operate in 1896. The settlement then had separate schools for Black and White students in the mid-1930s. It closed sometime after World War II, but Porter Springs had a high school and an elementary school in the early 1990s. Today, the community is served by the Crockett Independent School District.
