= Hickory Creek, Houston County, Texas =

- Unincorporated community
- Location within Texas Location within the United States
- Coordinates: 31°22′44″N 95°19′17″W
- Country: United States
- State: Texas
- County: Houston
- Elevation: 394 ft (120 m)
- Time zone: UTC-6 (Central (CST))
  - Summer (DST): UTC-5 (CDT)
- Area codes: 430 & 903
- GNIS feature ID: 1383342

Hickory Creek is an unincorporated community in Houston County, Texas, United States. According to the Handbook of Texas, the community had a population of 31 in 2000.

== History ==
Hickory Creek was most likely named for a nearby creek of the same name. A post office was established in 1876 but closed that next year. In the 1930s, it only had a church and several scattered houses. The population was 31 in 2000.

== Geography ==
Hickory Creek is located on Farm to Market Road 3187 near the Davy Crockett National Forest, 17 mi (27 km) northeast of Crockett in north-central Houston County.

== Education ==
Today, the community is served by the Kennard Independent School District.
