= Sand Ridge, Houston County, Texas =

- Ghost town
- Location within Texas Location within the United States
- Coordinates: 31°06′27″N 95°41′06″W
- Country: United States
- State: Texas
- County: Houston
- Elevation: 164 ft (50 m)
- Time zone: UTC-6 (Central (CST))
  - Summer (DST): UTC-5 (CDT)
- Area code: 936
- GNIS feature ID: 1380490

Sand Ridge is a ghost town in Houston County, Texas, United States.

== History ==
When Sand Ridge was settled is unknown, but it is believed to have been before 1900. In the mid-1930s, Sand Ridge had several scattered houses and several businesses. These details remained the same in the mid-1960s, though many residents left after World War II. By 1990, it became a dispersed community.

=== Geography ===
The community was located on Texas State Highway 21, about 20 miles (32 km) southwest of Crockett in southwestern Houston County.

=== Education ===
Sand Ridge had its own school in the mid-1930s. Any residents who live there now are within the Lovelady ISD.
