= Center Hill, Texas =

- Unincorporated community
- Location within Texas Location within the United States
- Coordinates: 31°22′49″N 95°14′50″W
- Country: United States
- State: Texas
- County: Houston
- Elevation: 417 ft (127 m)
- Time zone: UTC-6 (Central (CST))
  - Summer (DST): UTC-5 (CDT)
- Area codes: 430 & 903
- GNIS feature ID: 1383339

Center Hill, also known as Corinth, is an unincorporated community in Houston County, Texas, United States. According to the Handbook of Texas, the community had a population of 105 in 2000.

== History ==
Center Hill had a church, a cemetery, and several scattered houses in the mid-1930s. Only a church and a cemetery remained in the mid-1960s. Its population was 105 in 2000.

== Geography ==
Center Hill is located 1.5 mi (2.4 km) west of Kennard in east-central Houston County.

== Education ==
The community's first school, known as Corinth or Old Corinth School, was established in 1857 and continued to operate through the mid-1930s. It then joined the Kennard Independent School District.
