= Udston, Texas =

Ghost town in Texas, US

- Ghost town
- Location in Texas
- Coordinates: 31.34583330°N 95.63583330°W
- Country: United States
- State: Texas
- County: Houston

Udston is a ghost town in Houston County, Texas, United States. Situated on Farm to Market Road 229, it was established in the late 1880s, and post office operated in the community from 1887 to 1894. It peaked in the 1890s, with three businesses, and was abandoned by the 1930s.
