= Barfield Lake =

Barfield Lake may refer to:

- Barfield Lake (Alabama), in Dale County, Alabama
- Barfield Lake (Michigan), in Luce County, Michigan
- Barfield Lake (Texas), near Grapeland, Texas
