= Refuge, Texas =

- Unincorporated community
- Location within Texas Location within the United States
- Coordinates: 31°30′05″N 95°24′04″W
- Country: United States
- State: Texas
- County: Houston
- Elevation: 322 ft (98 m)
- Time zone: UTC-6 (Central (CST))
  - Summer (DST): UTC-5 (CDT)
- Area code: 936
- GNIS feature ID: 1366321

Refuge is an unincorporated community in Houston County, Texas, United States. According to the Handbook of Texas, the community had a population of 27 in 2000.

== History ==
The area in what is known as Refuge today was first settled sometime before 1900. There were four stores, two churches, and several scattered houses in the community in the mid-1930s. Many residents moved away after World War II, but the settlement had a cemetery, a sawmill, and several scattered houses in the mid-1960s. It was recognized as a dispersed rural community in the early 1990s. Its population was 27 in 2000.

Refuge was supposedly named because of it being a "refuge" against Indian raids. It was originally known as Fort Brown.

== Geography ==
Refuge is located on Farm to Market Road 227, 13 mi (21 km) northeast of Crockett in north-central Houston County.

== Education ==
Refuge is served by the Grapeland Independent School District.
