= Prairie Point, Houston County, Texas =

Coordinates: 31°04′44″N 95°29′22″W

Prairie Point, also known as Prairie, is a ghost town in Houston County, Texas, United States. It is located at the intersection of FM 230 and county roads 3615 and 3520.

== History ==
Prairie Point was established around the 1850s. In 1857, a post office was established in the area. In the 1930s, a school, a church, and a few houses were in the area. By World War II, most residents moved away. It became of a ghost town by the 1960s.

== Education ==
Prairie Point had a school from 1897 to approximately World War II. Students are now bused to Lovelady Independent School District.
