= Wesley Chapel, Texas =

Unincorporated community in Houston County

Coordinates: 31.372°N 95.540°W

Wesley Chapel is an unincorporated community in Houston County, Texas, United States. It is located off Farm to Market Road 229, 6 miles (9.7 km) from Crockett. It was settled after the Civil War, and a school was built in 1897. A new Wesley Chapel school was built approximately 0.5 miles (0.80 km) south in 1912. It was last used in 1948 and was destroyed by a tornado in 1953. Students in the area are zoned within the Latexo Independent School District.
