= Berea, Texas =

Berea
- Unincorporated community
- Location within Texas Location within the United States
- Coordinates: 31°20′04″N 95°18′41″W
- Country: United States
- State: Texas
- County: Houston
- GNIS feature ID: 1381394

Berea is an unincorporated community in Houston County, Texas, United States. According to the Handbook of Texas, the community had a population of 41 in 2000.

== History ==
The area in what is known as Berea today was founded sometime before 1900. There were two churches, several stores, a cemetery, and several scattered houses in the mid-1930s. There was only one church, a cemetery, and several houses in the mid-1960s. Its population was 41 in 2000.

== Geography ==
Berea is located at the intersection of Texas State Highway 7 and Farm to Market Road 232, 8 mi (13 km) east of Crockett in east-central Houston County.

== Education ==
Today, the community is served by the Kennard Independent School District.

== See also ==
- Texas State Highway 49
