= Wheeler Springs =

Wheeler Springs may refer to:

- Wheeler Springs, California, an unincorporated community in Ventura County, California
- Wheeler Springs, Texas, an unincorporated community in Houston County, Texas
