= Germany, Texas =

Unincorporated community in Texas, US

- Unincorporated community
- Location within Texas Location within the United States
- Coordinates: 31°26′25.2378″N 95°21′3.0954″W
- Country: United States
- State: Texas
- County: Houston County

Population (2000)
  - Total: 43
- Time zone: UTC−06:00 (CST)
  - Summer (DST): UTC−05:00 (CDT)
- Zip code: 75835

Germany is an unincorporated community in Houston County, Texas, United States. According to the Handbook of Texas, the community had a population of 43 in 2000.

== History ==
The town is most notable for its name, which is shared with the country of Germany.

== Geography ==
Germany is located on Texas State Highway 21 on the Old San Antonio Road, 10 mi (16 km) northeast of Crockett in east-central Houston County.

== Education ==
The community's first school was built in 1883. Today, the community is served by the Latexo Independent School District.
