= Cooper, Houston County, Texas =

- Unincorporated community
- Location within Texas Location within the United States
- Coordinates: 31°14′35″N 95°34′55″W
- Country: United States
- State: Texas
- County: Houston
- Elevation: 262 ft (80 m)
- Time zone: UTC-6 (Central (CST))
  - Summer (DST): UTC-5 (CDT)
- Area codes: 430 & 903
- GNIS feature ID: 2034917

Cooper is a small unincorporated community located in southwestern Houston County, Texas, United States. According to the Handbook of Texas, the community had a population of 27 in 2000.

== History ==
Cooper was established circa 1900, and by the mid-1930s had a church, a cemetery, and several houses. Many residents moved away after World War II, and by the early 1990s, only a church and a few widely scattered houses remained in the area. Its population was 27 in 2000.

== Geography ==
Cooper is located on Texas State Highway 21, 9 mi (14 km) southwest of Crockett in southwestern Houston County.

== Education ==
Today, the community is served by the Crockett Independent School District.
