= Guiceland, Texas =

Unincorporated community in Texas, US

Guiceland is an unincorporated community four miles from Grapeland in Houston County, Texas, United States. The population began to decline after World War II, and by the 1990s it was dispersed. Nearby children attend Grapeland ISD.
