= Reynard, Texas =

- Unincorporated community
- Location within Texas Location within the United States
- Coordinates: 31°24′38″N 95°39′17″W
- Country: United States
- State: Texas
- County: Houston
- Elevation: 200 ft (61 m)
- Time zone: UTC-6 (Central (CST))
  - Summer (DST): UTC-5 (CDT)
- Area codes: 430 & 903
- GNIS feature ID: 1380434

Reynard is an unincorporated community in Houston County, Texas, United States. According to the Handbook of Texas, the community had a population of 75 in 2000.

== History ==
The area in what is known as Reynard today was first settled sometime before 1900. A post office was established at Reynard in 1901 and remained in operation until 1907. By the 1930s the settlement had two general stores (one run by a Beasley, one run by a Smith,) a cotton gin named Beasley Gin, a mill, and a church. Only a church and some scattered houses remained in the mid-1960s. Its population was 75 in 2000.

== Geography ==
Lone Pine is located on Farm to Market Road 2544, 14 mi (23 km) northwest of Crockett in western Houston County.

== Education ==
Reynard had two schools in the mid-1930s. Today, the community is served by the Grapeland Independent School District.
