= Belott, Texas =

- Unincorporated community
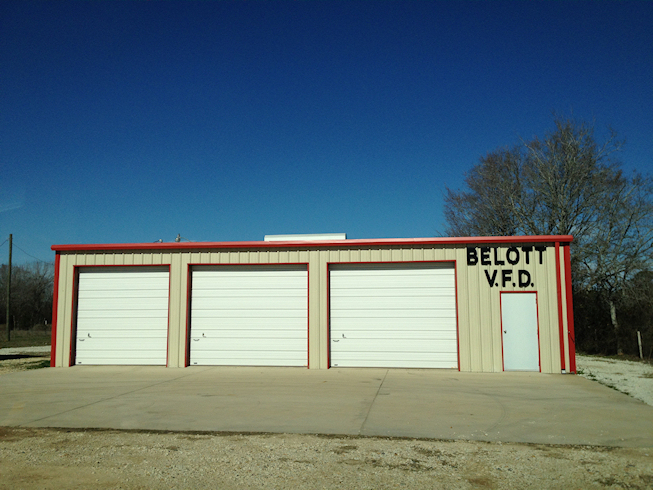
- Belott firehouse

- Location within Texas Location within the United States
- Coordinates: 31°25′51″N 95°18′22″W
- Country: United States
- State: Texas
- County: Houston
- Founded: c. 1863
- Elevation: 364 ft (111 m)

Population (2000)
  - Total: 101
- Time zone: UTC-6 (Central (CST))
  - Summer (DST): UTC-5 (CDT)
- ZIP code: 75835
- Area code: 936
- GNIS feature ID: 1383026

Belott is an unincorporated community in Houston County, Texas, United States. The population was 101 according to the 2000 census.

== History ==
The community was first settled around the time of the American Civil War. It was named for a prominent early settler, Andrew J. Belott, who is buried in the New Energy Cemetery. A post office operated in the community from 1890 to 1908. By the 1930s the settlement had a church, four stores, and an estimated population of fifty. Residents moved elsewhere after World War II, and by the mid-1960s, it had one store and a church. The population was 20 in 1965. Today the settlement is considered a dispersed rural community with a population of 101 as of 2000.

On May 31, 2004, an F0 tornado briefly touched down in Belott, but no damage was reported.

== Geography ==
Belott is located on Farm to Market Road 1733, 12 mi (19 km) northeast of Crockett in east-central Houston County.

== Education ==
The community's first school was built in the 1870s. It also had a school in the 1930s. In 1936 the school was merged with a school in nearby Glover, Texas, and in 1968 the Glover school became part of the Kennard Independent School District.
