= Plain, Texas =

Community in Texas, US

Coordinates: 31°27′06″N 95°06′37″W

Plain was a rural community four miles east of Tadmor in the Davy Crockett National Forest, in eastern Houston County, Texas, United States. It was founded in the 1880s and was deserted by 1990.
