= Halls Bluff, Texas =

- Ghost town
- Location within Texas Location within the United States
- Coordinates: 31°21′17″N 95°39′27″W
- Country: United States
- State: Texas
- County: Houston
- Elevation: 213 ft (65 m)
- Time zone: UTC-6 (Central (CST))
  - Summer (DST): UTC-5 (CDT)
- Area codes: 430 & 903
- GNIS feature ID: 1379880

Halls Bluff or Hall's Bluff is a ghost town in Houston County, Texas, United States.

== History ==
In honor of Joshua James Hall, an early pioneer who started a warehouse and shipping company on the river, it was founded in the early 1850s. Steamboats bringing cotton down the Trinity and merchandise up from Galveston to Crockett began to frequently stop in the hamlet. Halls Bluff's post office began operations in 1852 and continued through various interruptions until the middle of the 1850s. Following the arrival of the Houston and Great Northern Railroad in Crockett in 1872, the town started to decline. Halls Bluff had a church and several homes by the middle of the 1930s. Many of the community's population left after World War II, and by the 1960s only a few dispersed dwellings were left. Early in the 1990s, Halls Bluff was described as a dispersed, rural community.

== Geography ==
Halls Bluff is located on the Trinity River, 12 mi (19 km) west of Crockett in western Houston County.

== Education ==
Halls Bluff had its own school in the mid-1930s. Today, the community is served by the Crockett Independent School District.
