= Livelyville, Texas =

Unincorporated community in Texas, US

Coordinates: 31.5354°N 95.4419°W

Livelyville is a rural unincorporated community four miles from Grapeland in Houston County, Texas, United States. It was founded circa 1850 by Thomas Lively, who later donated land for a cemetery. The town had a school from the 1870s until 1901. A historical marker was placed at the site of the town's cemetery in 1982.
