= Latexo, Texas =

City in the United States

- City
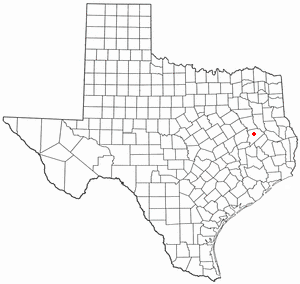
- Location of Latexo, Texas

- Coordinates: 31°22′53″N 95°28′18″W
- Country: United States
- State: Texas
- County: Houston

Area
  - Total: 0.98 sq mi (2.54 km^{2})
  - Land: 0.98 sq mi (2.54 km^{2})
  - Water: 0 sq mi (0.00 km^{2})
- Elevation: 371 ft (113 m)

Population (2020)
  - Total: 232
  - Density: 237/sq mi (91.3/km^{2})
- Time zone: UTC-6 (Central (CST))
  - Summer (DST): UTC-5 (CDT)
- ZIP code: 75849
- Area code: 936
- FIPS code: 48-41644
- GNIS feature ID: 2411632

Latexo (/ləˈtɛksoʊ/ lə-TEK-soh) is a city in Houston County, Texas, United States. Its population was 232 at the 2020 census.

== History ==
Just after 1900, the Louisiana Texas Orchard Company purchased 3,000 acres (12 km^{2}) surrounding the settlement and platted a town named "Latexo", an acronym of the company's name. Five schools have been built over the years in the community and the city of Latexo.

The first Bethel school building was on a dirt road that ran parallel with the railroad tracks, about 500 feet (150 m) south of the railroad crossing at the north end of the city. This building was later occupied as the home of Cleveland Willis. The second Bethel school built in the community was located on a street that went east from what was at that time the main road that ran south along the railroad tracks. This site in the 1960s and later years was known as the home site of the Stokes Reed family. This building was later sold (around 1930) to the Baptist Church and was used as such for many years.

The third site of the school was located about two houses east of the second site and was the location of what was referred to as the old Ed Burton home, but was the Bill McKinney home in 1961, and later the Clifford Price home. The third school was moved in 1930 to the present location. Two new buildings have been built on the same school property, replacing the previous building.

Famous people include Earlene Brown, athlete

== Geography ==
Latexo is located north of the center of Houston County. U.S. Route 287 is the main road through the city, leading south 5 miles (8 km) to Crockett, the county seat, and north 7 miles (11 km) to Grapeland.

According to the United States Census Bureau, the city has a total area of 0.97 square miles (2.5 km^{2}), all land.

== Demographics ==
Historical population
Census	Pop.	Note	%±
1980	312		—
1990	289		−7.4%
2000	272		−5.9%
2010	322		18.4%
2020	232		−28.0%
U.S. Decennial Census; 2020 Census

=== 2020 census ===
As of the 2020 census, Latexo had a population of 232 and a median age of 44.7 years. 22.8% of residents were under the age of 18 and 19.0% of residents were 65 years of age or older. For every 100 females there were 100.0 males, and for every 100 females age 18 and over there were 96.7 males age 18 and over.

0.0% of residents lived in urban areas, while 100.0% lived in rural areas.

There were 95 households in Latexo, of which 34.7% had children under the age of 18 living in them. Of all households, 56.8% were married-couple households, 11.6% were households with a male householder and no spouse or partner present, and 27.4% were households with a female householder and no spouse or partner present. About 16.9% of all households were made up of individuals and 2.2% had someone living alone who was 65 years of age or older.

There were 118 housing units, of which 19.5% were vacant. The homeowner vacancy rate was 3.8% and the rental vacancy rate was 4.0%.

Racial composition as of the 2020 census
Race	Number	Percent
White	183	78.9%
Black or African American	10	4.3%
American Indian and Alaska Native	0	0.0%
Asian	0	0.0%
Native Hawaiian and Other Pacific Islander	0	0.0%
Some other race	22	9.5%
Two or more races	17	7.3%
Hispanic or Latino (of any race)	29	12.5%

=== 2000 census ===
As of the census of 2000, 272 people, 116 households, and 70 families were residing in the city. The population density was 276.0 inhabitants per square mile (106.6/km^{2}). The 136 housing units averaged 138.0 per mi^{2} (53.0/km^{2}). The racial makeup of the city was 90.07% White, 3.31% African American, 21.37% Native American, 0.37% Asian, 3.68% from other races, and 2.21% from two or more races. Hispanics or Latinos of any race were 5.51% of the population.

Of the 116 households, 29.3% had children under the age of 18 living with them, 46.6% were married couples living together, 11.2% had a female householder with no husband present, and 38.8% were not families. About 36.2% of all households were made up of individuals, and 16.4% had someone living alone who was 65 years of age or older. The average household size was 2.34, and the average family size was 3.04.

In the city, theage distribution was 26.5% under 18, 9.6% from 18 to 24, 27.2% from 25 to 44, 21.7% from 45 to 64, and 15.1% who were 65 or older. The median age was 39 years. For every 100 females, there were 88.9 males. For every 100 females age 18 and over, there were 81.8 males.

The median income for a household in the city was $22,750, and for a family was $35,833. Males had a median income of $29,583 versus $18,750 for females. The per capita income for the city was $15,603. About 21.4% of families and 22.7% of the population were below the poverty line, including 27.2% of those under the age of 18 and 12.7% of those 65 or over.

== Education ==
The city is served by the Latexo Independent School District.
