= Lone Pine, Texas =

- Unincorporated community
- Location within Texas Location within the United States
- Coordinates: 31°10′55″N 95°29′01″W
- Country: United States
- State: Texas
- County: Houston
- Elevation: 315 ft (96 m)
- Time zone: UTC-6 (Central (CST))
  - Summer (DST): UTC-5 (CDT)
- Area codes: 430 & 903
- GNIS feature ID: 2034794

Lone Pine is an unincorporated community in Houston County, Texas, United States. According to the Handbook of Texas, the community had a population of 81 in 2000.

== History ==
The area in what is known as Lone Pine today was first settled sometime before 1900. It had a church, a store, and several scattered houses in the mid-1930s. Only a church and some scattered houses remained in the mid-1960s. Its population was 81 in 2000.

== Geography ==
Lone Pine is located on Farm to Market Road 231, 9 mi (14 km) south of Crockett in south-central Houston County.

== Education ==
Today, the community is served by the Lovelady Independent School District.
