= Creath, Texas =

- Unincorporated community
- Location within Texas Location within the United States
- Coordinates: 31°26′53″N 95°13′24″W
- Country: United States
- State: Texas
- County: Houston
- Elevation: 272 ft (83 m)
- Time zone: UTC-6 (Central (CST))
  - Summer (DST): UTC-5 (CDT)
- Area codes: 430 & 903
- GNIS feature ID: 1381713

Creath is an unincorporated community in Houston County, Texas, United States. According to the Handbook of Texas, the community had a population of 20 in 2000.

== History ==
The area in what is known as Creath today was founded by M.B. Creath sometime before 1900. Creath opened a general store and a cotton gin. He also served as the postmaster when a post office opened in 1904. There was a store, several scattered houses, and 100 residents in the mid-1930s. Only a few scattered homes remained in the early 1990s. The population was 20 in 2000.

== Geography ==
Creath is located on Farm to Market Road 1733 near Wilcox Branch, 15 mi (24 km) northeast of Crockett in eastern Houston County.

== Education ==
Today, the community is served by the Kennard Independent School District.
