= Percilla, Texas =

- Unincorporated community
- Location within Texas Location within the United States
- Coordinates: 31°32′50″N 95°23′57″W
- Country: United States
- State: Texas
- County: Houston
- Elevation: 427 ft (130 m)
- Time zone: UTC-6 (Central (CST))
  - Summer (DST): UTC-5 (CDT)
- Area code: 936
- GNIS feature ID: 1365059

Percilla, also known as Evergreen, is an unincorporated community in Houston County, Texas, United States. According to the Handbook of Texas, the community had a population of 95 in 2000.

== Geography ==
Percilla is located at the intersections of Farm to Market Roads 2022 and 228, 6 mi (9.7 km) northeast of Grapeland, 18 mi (29 km) northeast of Crockett, 7 mi (11 km) south of Slocum, and 4 mi (6.4 km) west of Waneta in north-central Houston County.

== Education ==
Percilla had a school called Evergreen School in 1879. It continued to operate in the mid-1930s, then closed sometime after World War II. Today, the community is served by the Grapeland Independent School District.
