= Salmon Lake Park =

Recreational vehicle park in Grapeland, Texas

Coordinates: 31.4942°N 95.4927°W

Salmon Lake Park is a unique private recreational vehicle park in Grapeland, Texas. It is famous for its bluegrass festival. They offer Cabins rentals, RV, and tent camping year round. They host family and school reunions, parties, car shows, and festivals. They can be contacted at www.SalmonLakePark.com and by phone 936-687-2594

On the first of June 2021, the small man-made lake suffered a structural failure resulting in an uncontrolled draining of the lake.
