= Elkins, Texas =

Elkins is a ghost town in Houston County, Texas. United States. It was established circa 1900. The town was named after William Eli Elkins, superintendent of a nearby coal mine.
