= Texas State Highway 49 =

State highway in Texas, United States

State Highway 49

Route information
- Maintained by TxDOT
- Length: 60.84 mi (Note: The certified mileage given is shorter than the actual mileage as TxDOT considers SH 49 to be discontinuous at rather than concurrent with US 259 and SH 11.) (97.91 km)
- Existed: 1923–present

Major junctions
- West end: US 271 in Mt. Pleasant
- US 259 in Daingerfield Future I-369 / US 59 in Jefferson
- East end: LA 2 at the Louisiana state line near Trees

Location
- Country: United States
- State: Texas
- Counties: Titus, Morris, Cass, Marion

Highway system
- Highways in Texas; Interstate; US; State; Former; Toll; Loops; Spurs; FM/RM; Park; Rec
← I-49	→ SH 50

State Highway 49 (SH 49) is a designated north–south state highway in Texas, running from Mount Pleasant to the Louisiana state line about three miles (4.8 km) north of Caddo Lake, where it continues as Louisiana Highway 2 to Trees, Louisiana. SH 49 covers a total distance of 71.2 miles (114.6 km).

State Highway 49 begins at The Bill Ratliff Freeway U.S. Highway 271 in western Mount Pleasant, and progresses in a southeasterly direction, merging with US 259 at the city limits of Daingerfield, running concurrently through the center of the town, then joins State Highway 11, forming a triple concurrency for about one-third of a mile, passing an overpass of the former Louisiana and Arkansas Railway with only 13'6" of clearance.

SH 49 leaves Daingerfield to the east, still concurrent with SH 11, crossing the same railway again just east of Daingerfield State Park, then follows alongside the railway into the town of Hughes Springs, whereafter it splits from SH 11, but continues to follow the L&A corridor further to the southeast, crossing State Highway 155 in Avinger, and U.S. Highway 59 (Future Interstate 369) in Jefferson. SH 49 departs from the L&A and veers sharply northeastward to follow the Missouri Pacific Railroad for several miles, then continues further eastward to the state line.

Overall, SH 49 passes through four Texas counties: Titus, Morris, Cass, and Marion.

== Previous routes ==

The route was originally designated on August 21, 1923, along its current route, with an extension farther northwest, terminating in Paris along previously designated SH 35. On February 21, 1938, SH 49 Business was designated in Bogata. On September 26, 1939, the section from Paris to Mt. Pleasant had again been transferred, this time to U.S. Highway 271 (which it was cosigned with since 1935).

Business State Highway 49
- Location: Red River County
- Existed: February 21, 1938–September 26, 1939

State Highway Loop 38
- Location: Red River County
- Existed: September 26, 1939–June 21, 1990

SH 49 Business was renumbered as Loop 38.

== Junction list ==
County	Location	mi	km	Destinations	Notes
Titus	Mount Pleasant	0.0	0.0	US 271 (Bill Ratliff Freeway)	
Titus	Mount Pleasant	0.9	1.4	FM 899 west (1st Street)	West end of FM 899 overlap
Titus	Mount Pleasant	1.2	1.9	FM 127 south (O'Tyson Boulevard) / FM 899 east (1st Street)	East end of FM 899 overlap
Titus	Mount Pleasant	1.9	3.1	Bus. US 271 (Jefferson Avenue) – Pittsburg	
Titus		4.9	7.9	FM 2348	
Titus		5.5	8.9	FM 1735 south	
Titus		7.3	11.7	FM 1000 north	
Morris		12.3	19.8	FM 144 north – Omaha	West end of FM 144 overlap
Morris		12.8	20.6	FM 144 south – Cason	East end of FM 144 overlap
Morris		18.3	29.5	US 259 north – Omaha	West end of US 259 overlap
Morris	Daingerfield	18.7	30.1	FM 130 west (Georgia Pacific Drive)	
Morris	Daingerfield	19.3	31.1	SH 11 west (W.M. Watson Boulevard) – Pittsburg	West end of SH 11 overlap
Morris	Daingerfield	19.6	31.5	US 259 south (Linda Drive) – Longview	East end of US 259 overlap
Morris		22.0	35.4	PR 17 – Daingerfield State Park	
Cass	Hughes Springs	25.5	41.0	FM 161 / FM 250 south (Taylor Street) – Naples, Lone Star	West end of FM 250 overlap
Cass	Hughes Springs	25.7	41.4	FM 250 north (Keasler Street) – Marietta	East end of FM 250 overlap
Cass		27.1	43.6	SH 11 east / FM 2612 west – Linden	East end of SH 11 overlap
Cass	Avinger	34.8	56.0	SH 155 – Linden, Gilmer	
Marion		40.2	64.7	FM 1969 south – Lake O' the Pines	
Marion		47.0	75.6	FM 729 west – Lake O' the Pines	
Marion		48.6	78.2	FM 728 north – Berea	
Marion	Jefferson	49.6	79.8	FM 881 north	
Marion	Jefferson	50.4	81.1	US 59 (Walcott Street) / Future I-369 – Linden, Marshall	
Marion	Jefferson	50.7	81.6	FM 134 east (Polk Street) – Karnack	
Marion		53.6	86.3	FM 248 north – Lodi	
Marion		59.0	95.0	FM 805 east – Caddo Lake	
Marion		63.2	101.7	SH 43 – Atlanta, Marshall	
Marion		69.4	111.7	FM 727 south – Caddo Lake	
Marion		71.2	114.6	LA 2 east	State line; continuation into Louisiana
1.000 mi = 1.609 km; 1.000 km = 0.621 mi: Concurrency terminus
