= Tadmor, Texas =

- Unincorporated community
- Location within Texas Location within the United States
- Coordinates: 31°25′45″N 95°10′33″W
- Country: United States
- State: Texas
- County: Houston
- Elevation: 361 ft (110 m)
- Time zone: UTC-6 (Central (CST))
  - Summer (DST): UTC-5 (CDT)
- Area codes: 430 & 903
- GNIS feature ID: 1382840

Tadmor is an unincorporated community in Houston County, Texas, United States. According to the Handbook of Texas, the community had a population of 67 in 2000.

== History ==
The area was first settled in the 1830s and was named after the biblical town of Tadmor. A post office was established at Tadmor in 1885 and remained in operation until 1914. In the mid-1890s, it had two general stores and a cotton gin with a population of 25 inhabitants. Its population was 67 in 2000.

== Geography ==
Tadmor is located on Farm to Market Road 227, 18 mi (29 km) northeast of Crockett in northeastern Houston County.

== Education ==
Two schools opened in Tadmor sometime before 1900, with one for White students and the other for Black students. They closed sometime after the 1930s. Today, the community is served by the Kennard Independent School District.
