= Givens Hill, Texas =

Unincorporated community in Texas, US

Coordinates: 31.2778°N 95.4689°W

Givens Hill is an unincorporated community in Houston County, Texas, United States. It grew up around the home of Solomon Givens and Lula Burleson Givens who were both born in Houston County to former enslaved workers. Solomon and Lula married in 1871 and bought 34 acres of land. Their farm was successful enough that they built an 8-room farmhouse. They led the building of a nearby school and Baptist church and baptisms were held in a water tank on their land.
