= Shiloh, Houston County, Texas =

Shiloh is a ghost town in Houston County, Texas, United States, just off FM 2110. It was founded by Stephen F. Box in 1834. During the 1840s, religious revivals were held in the town, and attendees from Houston camped in Shiloh. A local school was built in the 1850s. During the Civil War, the school was a draft post. After the war, the town declined. By the 1930s, Shiloh had a church and a few scattered houses. In the 1960s, the church remained (as it still does today), as well as very scattered houses. In 1973, a historical marker was placed in the town. Today, only the Methodist church remains.
