= Volga, Texas =

Unincorporated community in Texas, US

Coordinates: 31°03′57″N 95°34′56″W

Volga is an unincorporated community in Houston County, Texas, United States. It is located three miles from Weldon and 20 miles from Crockett. A post office was established in 1897, but was discontinued in 1917 when the mail was sent to Weldon (which was later sent to Lovelady). The population declined from 100 in 1914, to 25 in 1945. It has since been dispersed.
