= Ratcliff, Texas =

- Unincorporated community
- Location within Texas Location within the United States
- Coordinates: 31°23′33″N 95°8′46″W
- Country: United States
- State: Texas
- County: Houston
- Time zone: UTC-6 (Central (CST))
  - Summer (DST): UTC-5 (CDT)
- ZIP codes: 75858
- GNIS feature ID: 1382593

Ratcliff is an unincorporated community in Houston County, Texas, in East Texas, United States. According to the Handbook of Texas, the community had a population of 106 in 2000.

== History ==
When a Georgia wagon train brought a group of immigrants into eastern Houston County around 1875, Ratcliff was established. It was given that name in honor of Jesse H. Ratcliff, who on February 6, 1889, erected a post office and built a sawmill in a region of virgin pines. The massive sawmilling enterprise known as Four C Mill was built on the foundation of Ratcliff's sawmill, which was sold to Central Coal and Coke Company in 1901. More than 5,000 people lived there during the boomtime of the sawmills. Up until the early 20th century, Ratcliff was a thriving lumber town. The 120,000 acres (49,000 ha) of the surrounding forest had been cleared by 1920, and the town fell into decline until the middle of the 1930s. The establishment of Davy Crockett National Forest, land sales, and a reforestation project run by the Civilian Conservation Corps all contributed to the economy's recovery. A mile west of the town, the campground known as Ratcliff Lake Recreation Area attracted tourists. Two Texas historical markers were placed in Ratcliff: one for the town itself in 1972 and another for the Four C Mill in 1973. Ratcliff had two enterprises in 1980, and 106 people lived there in 1990 and 2000.

The community had three stores in operation around the time the post office opened. Ratcliff himself served as postmaster. Doctors H.L. McCall and Jake Jackson practiced medicine in the community.

On April 13, 2019, an F1 tornado struck Ratcliff. This tornado snapped and uprooted trees and severely damaged a double-wide mobile home, pushing it into a wooded area. Four of its occupants were injured but later released from the hospital. Another EF0 tornado hit the Davy Crockett National Forest, but the full path is unknown.

== Geography ==
Ratcliff is located at the intersection of Farm to Market Road 227 and Texas State Highway 7, 3.5 mi (5.6 km) east of Kennard, 18 mi (29 km) east of Crockett, and 36 mi (58 km) southwest of Nacogdoches in eastern Houston County.

Texas State Highway 103 also travels through the community.

== Education ==
The Old Ratcliff School was established in 1890. Dora Hager was the teacher there. The school moved closer to the community in 1901, then joined the Kennard Independent School District in 1955.

== Notable person ==
Richard H. Keith, coal and lumberman.

== Gallery ==
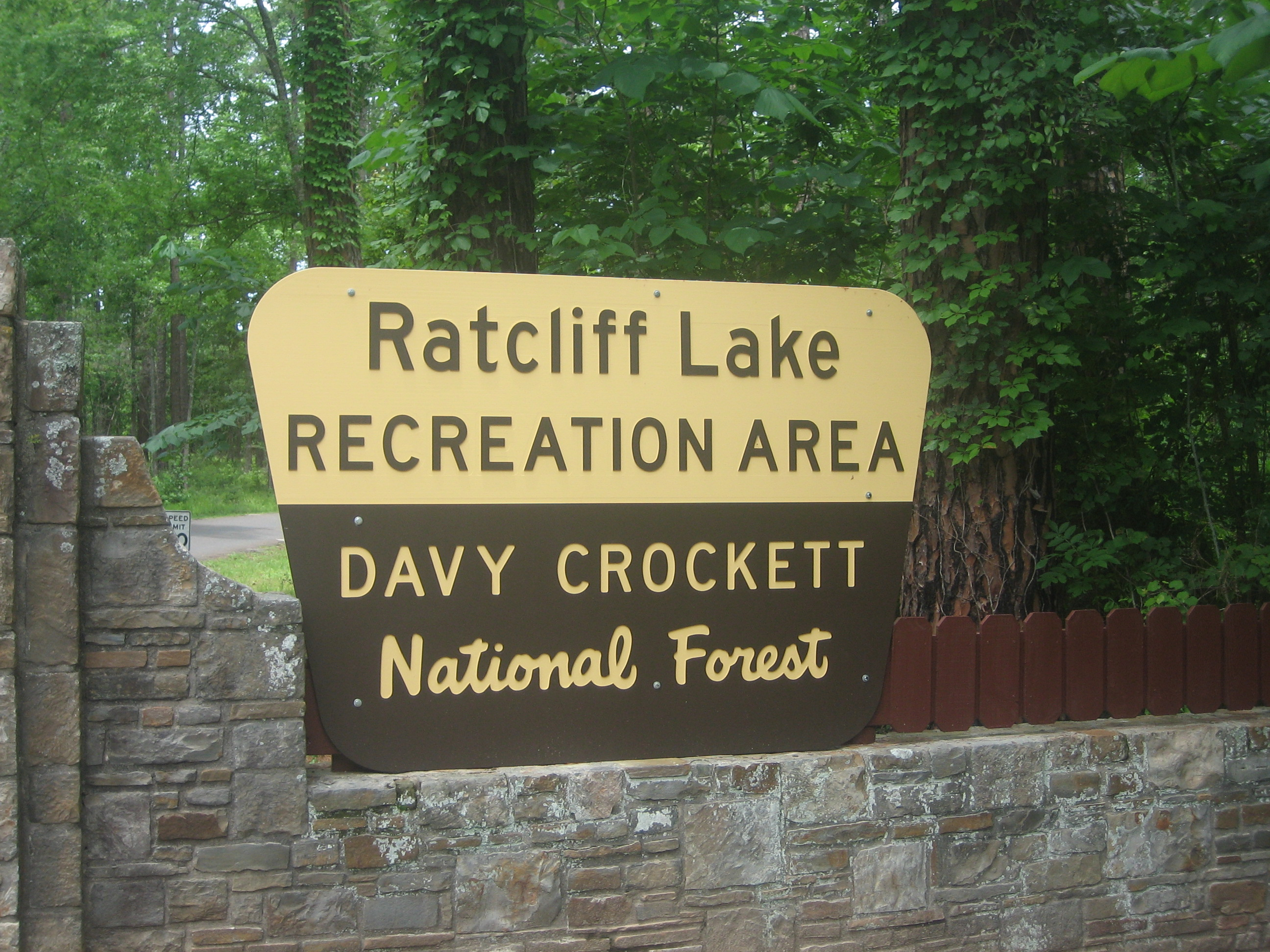
Entrance sign to Ratcliff Lake Recreation Area at Ratcliff, Texas

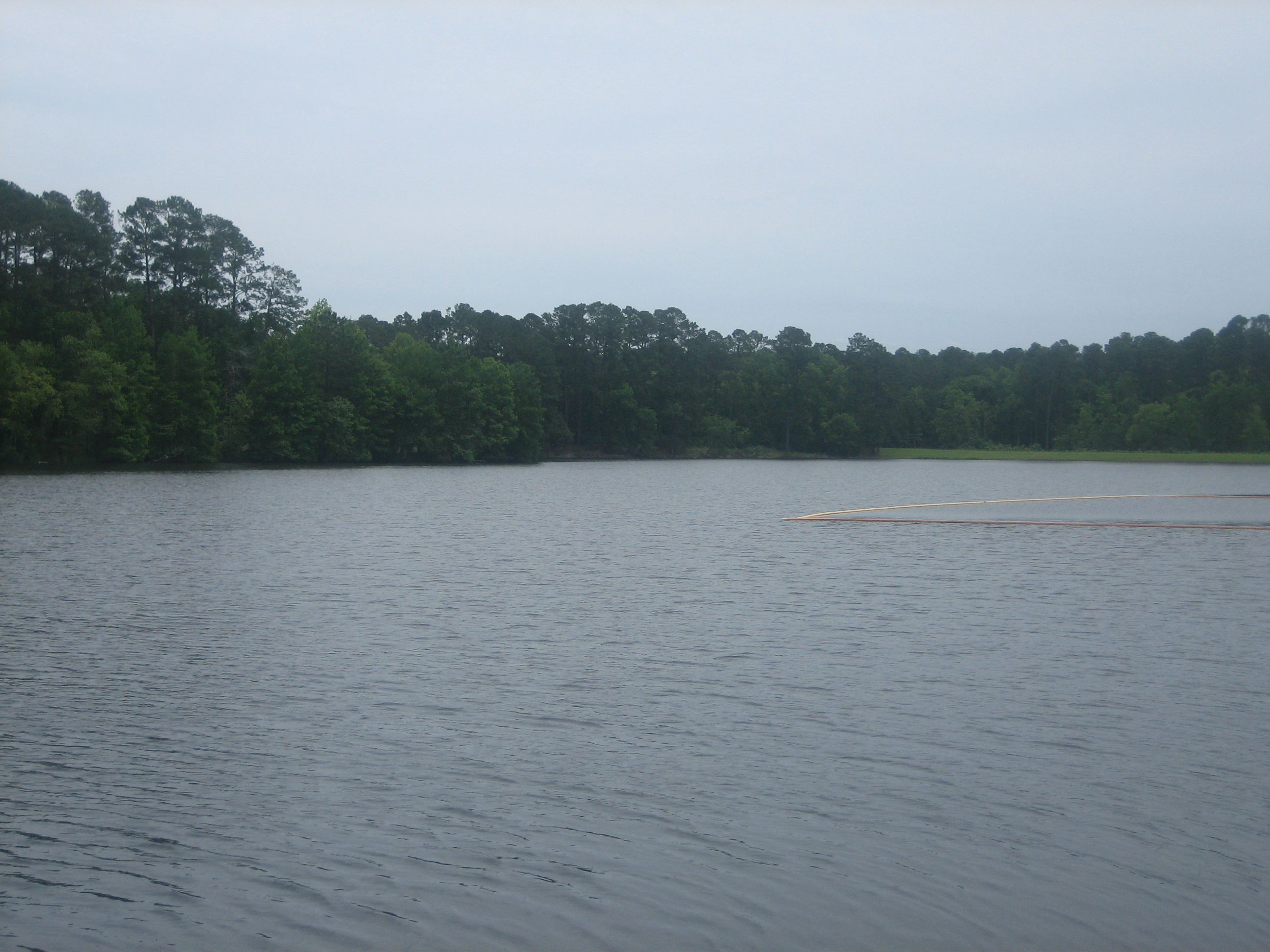
Ratcliff Lake in the Davy Crockett National Forest

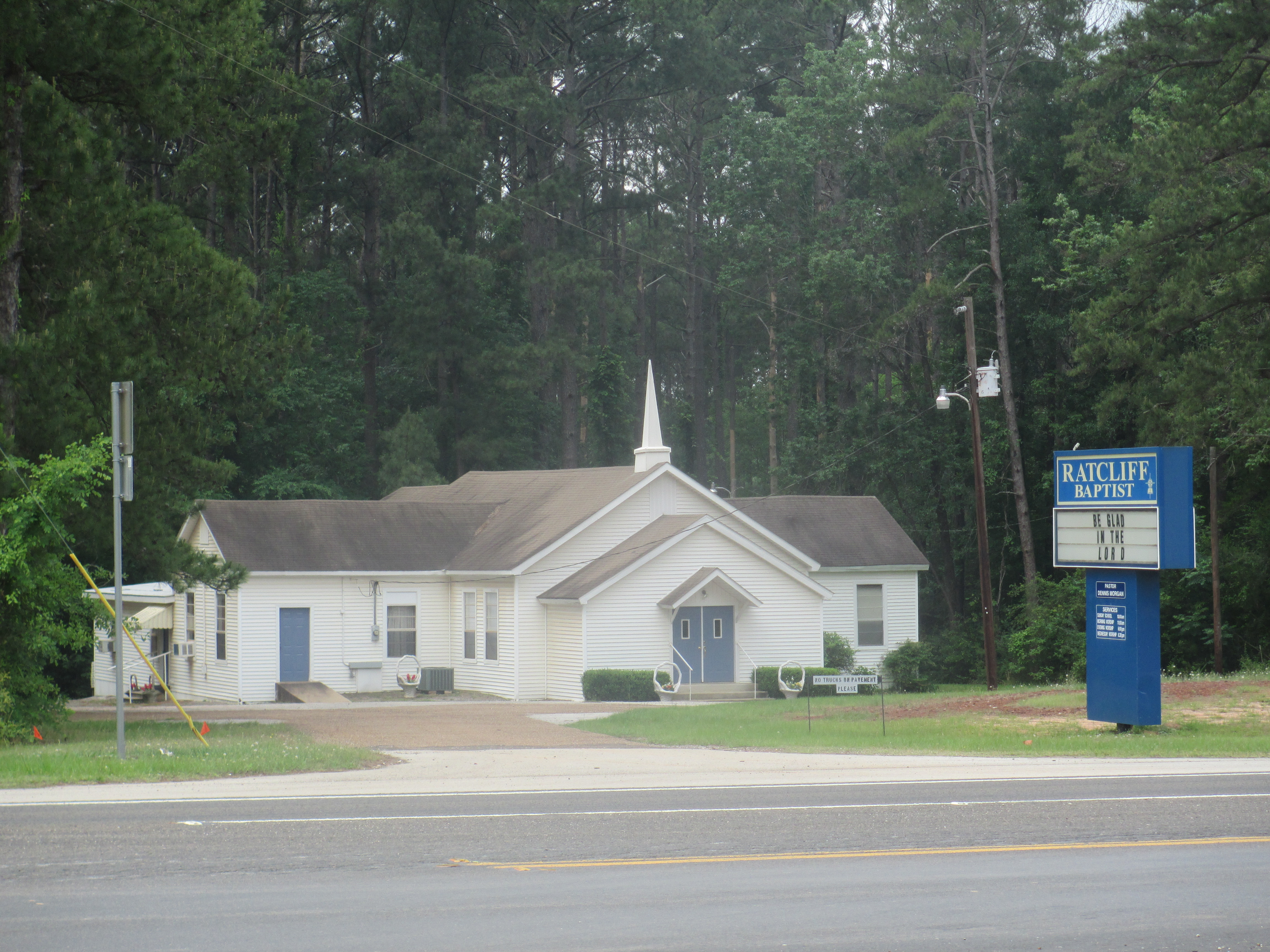
Ratcliff Baptist Church on Texas State Highway 7
