= Antioch, Houston County, Texas =

Ghost town in Texas, US

Antioch
- Ghost town
- Location in Texas
- Coordinates: 31.09740540°N 95.50411110°W
- Country: United States
- State: Texas
- County: Houston

Antioch is a ghost town in Houston County, Texas, United States. Situated on Farm to Market Road 230, it was established in the late 1880s, and a post office opened there from 1890, closing at an unknown date. At its peak in 1896, the population was 30, and was abandoned by the 1990s.
