= Coltharp, Texas =

Unincorporated area in Texas, US

Coltharp was an unincorporated area in Houston County, Texas, United States. It was located on the Cochino Bayou, 20 miles east of Crockett, roughly where the intersection of Farm to Market Road 513 and Forest Service Road 521 A is located.

== History ==
Coltharp was founded by a store and mill owner who settled in the area before the 1860s (probably around 1857, when a post office was first settled there). By 1891, Baptist, Methodist, and Presbyterian congregations, a school, several mills, a gunsmith, and a blacksmith were in Coltharp. A year later, a constable, two justices, and a doctor arrived in the town, which had a population of 100. Five years later, the population dwindled to 75, but jumped back up to 115 in 1900, the last time the population was estimated. The town apparently was abandoned by 1946 because it no longer appeared on the highway map.

== Education ==
Coltharp School was founded no later than 1884 and closed in 1925. Today, students in the area are zoned in the Kennard Independent School District.
