= Cut, Texas =

- Unincorporated community
- Location within Texas Location within the United States
- Coordinates: 31°13′19″N 95°28′55″W
- Country: United States
- State: Texas
- County: Houston
- Elevation: 371 ft (113 m)
- Time zone: UTC-6 (Central (CST))
  - Summer (DST): UTC-5 (CDT)
- ZIP code: 75835

Cut (also known as Paso or Paso Switch) is an unincorporated community in Houston County, Texas, United States. Cut is located on Texas State Highway 19, 6 miles (9.7 km) south of Crockett. The town was founded around a watering rest stop along the Houston and Great Northern Railroad, and was originally called Paso or Paso Switch, and was renamed in 1900. By the 1990s, Cut had been abandoned.
