= Fodice, Texas =

- Unincorporated community
- Location within Texas Location within the United States
- Coordinates: 31°10′23″N 95°18′7″W
- Country: United States
- State: Texas
- County: Houston
- Elevation: 299 ft (91 m)
- Time zone: UTC-6 (Central (CST))
  - Summer (DST): UTC-5 (CDT)
- Area codes: 430 & 903
- GNIS feature ID: 1381880

Fodice is an unincorporated community in Houston County, Texas, United States. According to the Handbook of Texas, the community had a population of 49 in 2000.

== Geography ==
Fodice is located on U.S. Highway 287 at the intersection of Fodice Road and Farm to Market Road 4200, 4 mi (6.4 km) west of Pennington and 14 mi (23 km) southeast of Crockett in southern Houston County.

== Education ==
Fodice had its own school in 1886 and continued to operate in the mid-1930s. It closed sometime after World War II. Today, the community is served by the Groveton Independent School District.
