= Pleasant Grove, Houston County, Texas =

Unincorporated community in Texas, US

Pleasant Grove is a rural farming unincorporated community in Houston County, Texas, United States. It is located six miles from Lovelady off State Highway 19. It was established after the Civil War. A school was built in 1857. By the 1990s, the town was dispersed, although the church with several members still remains.
