= Houston County, Texas =

County in Texas, United States

- County
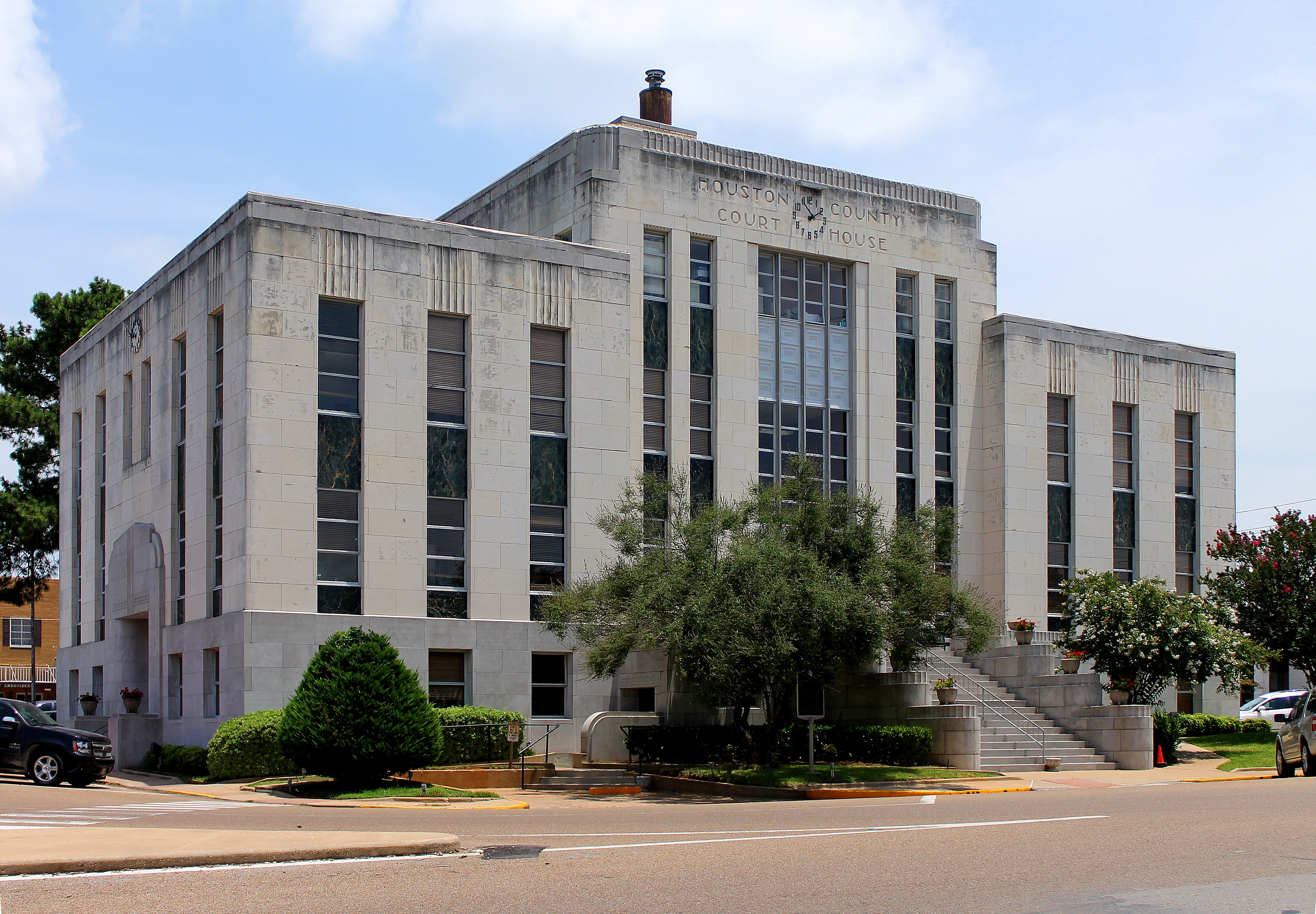
- The Houston County Courthouse in Crockett is located at the intersections of Texas State Highway 21 and U.S. Route 287.

- Flag

- Location within the U.S. state of Texas
- Coordinates: 31°19′N 95°26′W
- Country: United States
- State: Texas
- Founded: 1837
- Named for: Sam Houston
- Seat: Crockett
- Largest city: Crockett

Area
  - Total: 1,237 sq mi (3,200 km^{2})
  - Land: 1,231 sq mi (3,190 km^{2})
  - Water: 5.7 sq mi (15 km^{2}) 0.5%

Population (2020)
  - Total: 22,066
  - Estimate (2025): 22,316 ▲
  - Density: 17.93/sq mi (6.921/km^{2})
- Time zone: UTC−6 (Central)
  - Summer (DST): UTC−5 (CDT)
- Congressional district: 17th
- Website: www.co.houston.tx.us

Houston County is a county located in the U.S. state of Texas. As of the 2020 census, its population was 22,066. Its county seat is Crockett. Houston County was one of 46 entirely dry counties in the state of Texas, until voters in a November 2007 special election legalized the sale of alcohol in the county.

Houston County was the first new county created under the nine-year Republic of Texas on June 12, 1837. The original boundaries of Houston County also included all of present-day Anderson and Trinity Counties, and portions of present-day Henderson and Polk Counties.

The county is named for Sam Houston, President of the Republic of Texas and Governor of Texas. Other than being named for the same person, Houston County is not related to Texas' most populous city, Houston, which is located about 100 miles (160 kilometers) to the south, in Harris County.

== History ==
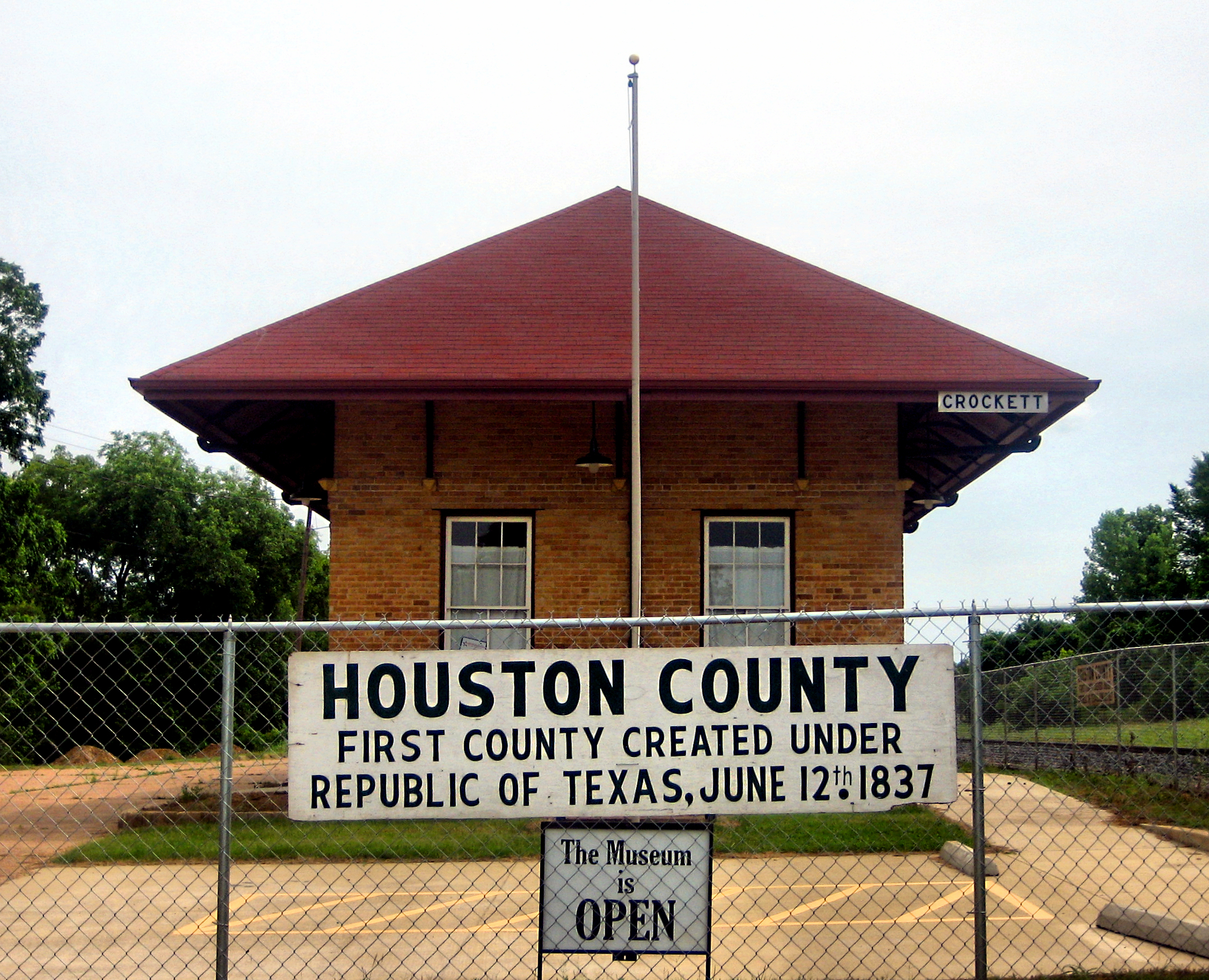
The Houston County Museum is located in a restored railroad depot south of Crockett.

The Four C Mill operated in Houston County during the first two decades of the 20th century. R. M. Keith, agent of the Central Coal and Coke Company in Kansas City, Missouri, began buying virgin timber in the fall of 1899. Lumber to construct the new mill was cut by a small sawmill purchased in early 1901 from J. H. Ratcliff. Keith organized the Louisiana and Texas Lumber Company to operate the Four C. The mill was producing 300,000 board feet of lumber daily by June 1902. Ratcliff Lake, now a United States Department of Interior recreational site, was the millpond for the Four C. The Texas Southeastern Railroad laid track from Lufkin to haul out the lumber. The town of Ratcliff was separated from the Four C by a fence, built to discourage the mill workers from spending their money outside the company town. The 120,000 acres were in time exhausted, and by 1920, the mill shut down.

== Geography ==
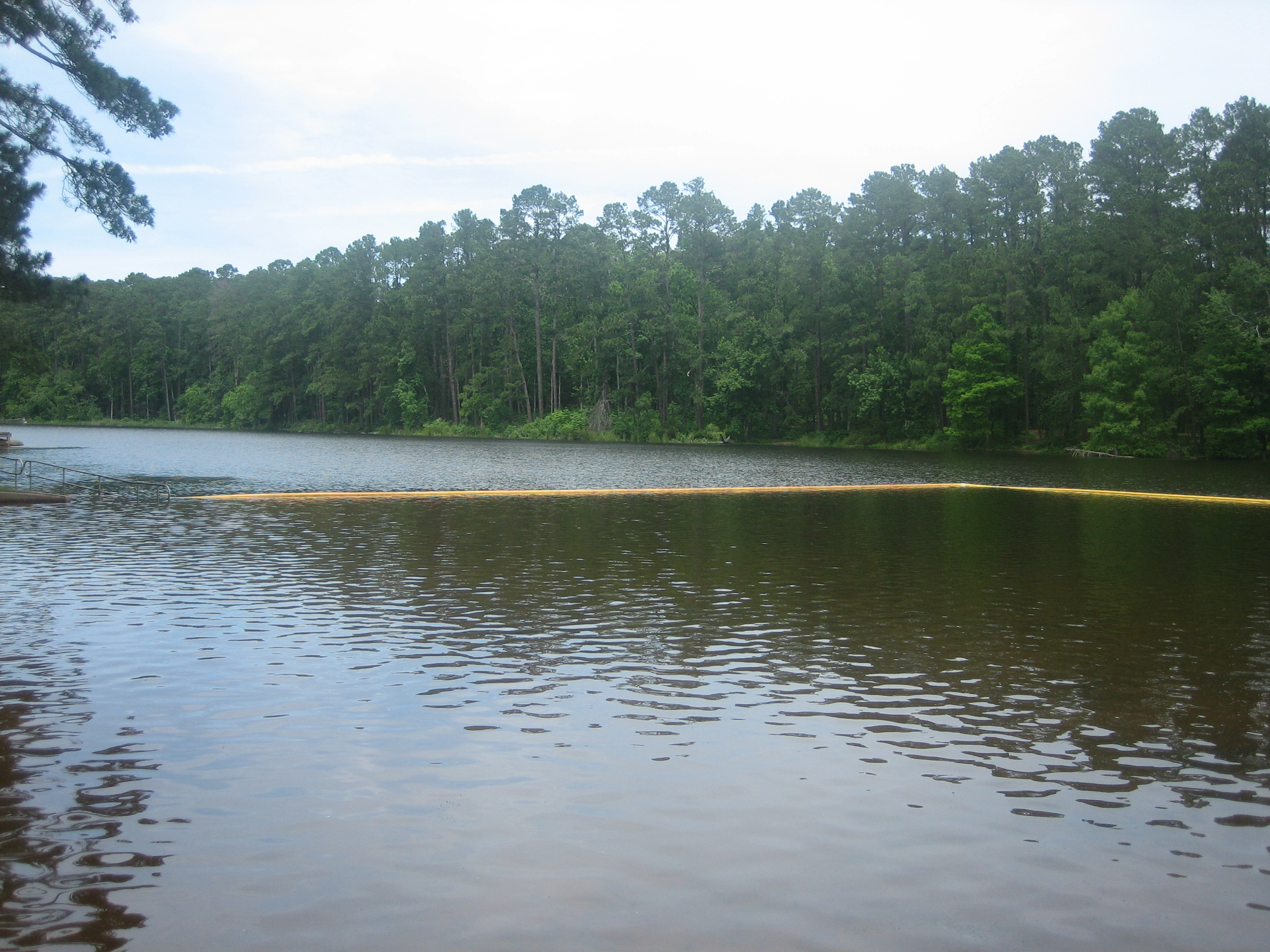
Ratcliff Lake Recreation Area is located in the Davy Crockett National Forest in Houston County east of Crockett.

According to the U.S. Census Bureau, the county has a total area of 1,237 sq mi (3,200 km^{2}), of which 1,231 sq mi (3,190 km^{2}) are land and 5.7 sq mi (15 km^{2}) (0.5%) are covered by water.

=== Adjacent counties ===
- Anderson County (north)
- Cherokee County (northeast)
- Angelina County (east)
- Trinity County (southeast)
- Walker County (south)
- Madison County (southwest)
- Leon County (west)

=== National protected area ===
- Davy Crockett National Forest (part)

== Demographics ==
Historical population
Census	Pop.	Note	%±
1850	2,721		—
1860	8,058		196.1%
1870	8,147		1.1%
1880	16,702		105.0%
1890	19,360		15.9%
1900	25,452		31.5%
1910	29,564		16.2%
1920	28,601		−3.3%
1930	30,017		5.0%
1940	31,137		3.7%
1950	22,825		−26.7%
1960	19,276		−15.5%
1970	17,855		−7.4%
1980	22,299		24.9%
1990	21,375		−4.1%
2000	23,185		8.5%
2010	23,732		2.4%
2020	22,066		−7.0%
2025 (est.)	22,316	▲	1.1%

=== Racial and ethnic composition ===
Houston County, Texas – Racial and ethnic composition Note: the US Census treats Hispanic/Latino as an ethnic category. This table excludes Latinos from the racial categories and assigns them to a separate category. Hispanics/Latinos may be of any race.
Race / Ethnicity (NH = Non-Hispanic)	Pop 1980	Pop 1990	Pop 2000	Pop 2010	Pop 2020	% 1980	% 1990	% 2000	% 2010	% 2020
White alone (NH)	14,277	14,042	14,775	14,811	12,957	64.03%	65.69%	63.73%	62.41%	58.72%
Black or African American alone (NH)	7,151	6,272	6,442	6,129	5,163	32.07%	29.34%	27.79%	25.83%	23.40%
Native American or Alaska Native alone (NH)	36	26	51	75	94	0.16%	0.12%	0.22%	0.32%	0.43%
Asian alone (NH)	24	47	53	95	138	0.11%	0.22%	0.23%	0.40%	0.63%
Native Hawaiian or Pacific Islander alone (NH)	x	x	4	1	8	x	x	0.02%	0.00%	0.04%
Other race alone (NH)	2	23	2	25	58	0.01%	0.11%	0.01%	0.11%	0.26%
Mixed race or Multiracial (NH)	x	x	119	232	577	x	x	0.51%	0.98%	2.61%
Hispanic or Latino (any race)	809	965	1,739	2,364	3,071	3.63%	4.51%	7.50%	9.96%	13.92%
Total	22,299	21,375	23,185	23,732	22,066	100.00%	100.00%	100.00%	100.00%	100.00%

=== 2020 census ===
As of the 2020 census, the county had a population of 22,066. The median age was 45.2 years. 18.9% of residents were under the age of 18 and 22.1% of residents were 65 years of age or older.

For every 100 females there were 117.7 males, and for every 100 females age 18 and over there were 120.8 males age 18 and over.

The racial makeup of the county was 60.9% White, 23.5% Black or African American, 0.6% American Indian and Alaska Native, 0.6% Asian, <0.1% Native Hawaiian and Pacific Islander, 8.8% from some other race, and 5.5% from two or more races. Hispanic or Latino residents of any race comprised 13.9% of the population.

26.9% of residents lived in urban areas, while 73.1% lived in rural areas.

There were 8,132 households in the county, of which 27.6% had children under the age of 18 living in them. Of all households, 47.0% were married-couple households, 19.2% were households with a male householder and no spouse or partner present, and 29.6% were households with a female householder and no spouse or partner present. About 29.9% of all households were made up of individuals and 15.1% had someone living alone who was 65 years of age or older.

There were 10,758 housing units, of which 24.4% were vacant. Among occupied housing units, 72.4% were owner-occupied and 27.6% were renter-occupied. The homeowner vacancy rate was 2.7% and the rental vacancy rate was 9.9%.

=== 2000 census ===
As of the 2000 census, 23,185 people, 8,259 households, and 5,756 families were residing in the county. The population density was 19 people/mi^{2} (7.3 people/km^{2}); it had the second-lowest population density for all counties in Deep East Texas, behind only Newton County. The 10,730 housing units averaged 9 units per square mile (3.5/km^{2}). The racial makeup of the county was 68.57% White, 27.93% African American, 0.26% Native American, 0.25% Asian, 2.23% from other races, and 0.76% from two or more races. About 7.50% of the population were Hispanics or Latinos of any race.

Of the 8,259 households, 28.7% had children under 18 living with them, 51.9% were married couples living together, 14.2% had a female householder with no husband present, and 30.3% were not families. About 27.9% of all households were made up of individuals, and 15.1% had someone living alone who was 65 or older. The average household size was 2.44, and the average family size was 2.97.

In the county, the age distribution was 23.2% under 18, 6.8% from 18 to 24, 27.70% from 25 to 44, 24.3% from 45 to 64, and 18.0% who were 65 or older. The median age was 40.0 years. For every 100 females, there were 114.1 males. For every 100 females 18 and over, there were 115.9 males.

The median income for a household in the county was $28,119, and for a family was $35,033. Males had a median income of $29,143 versus $19,885 for females. The per capita income for the county was $14,525. About 15.6% of families and 21.0% of the population were below the poverty line, including 28.3% of those under 18 and 18.2% of those 65 or over.

== Government and infrastructure ==
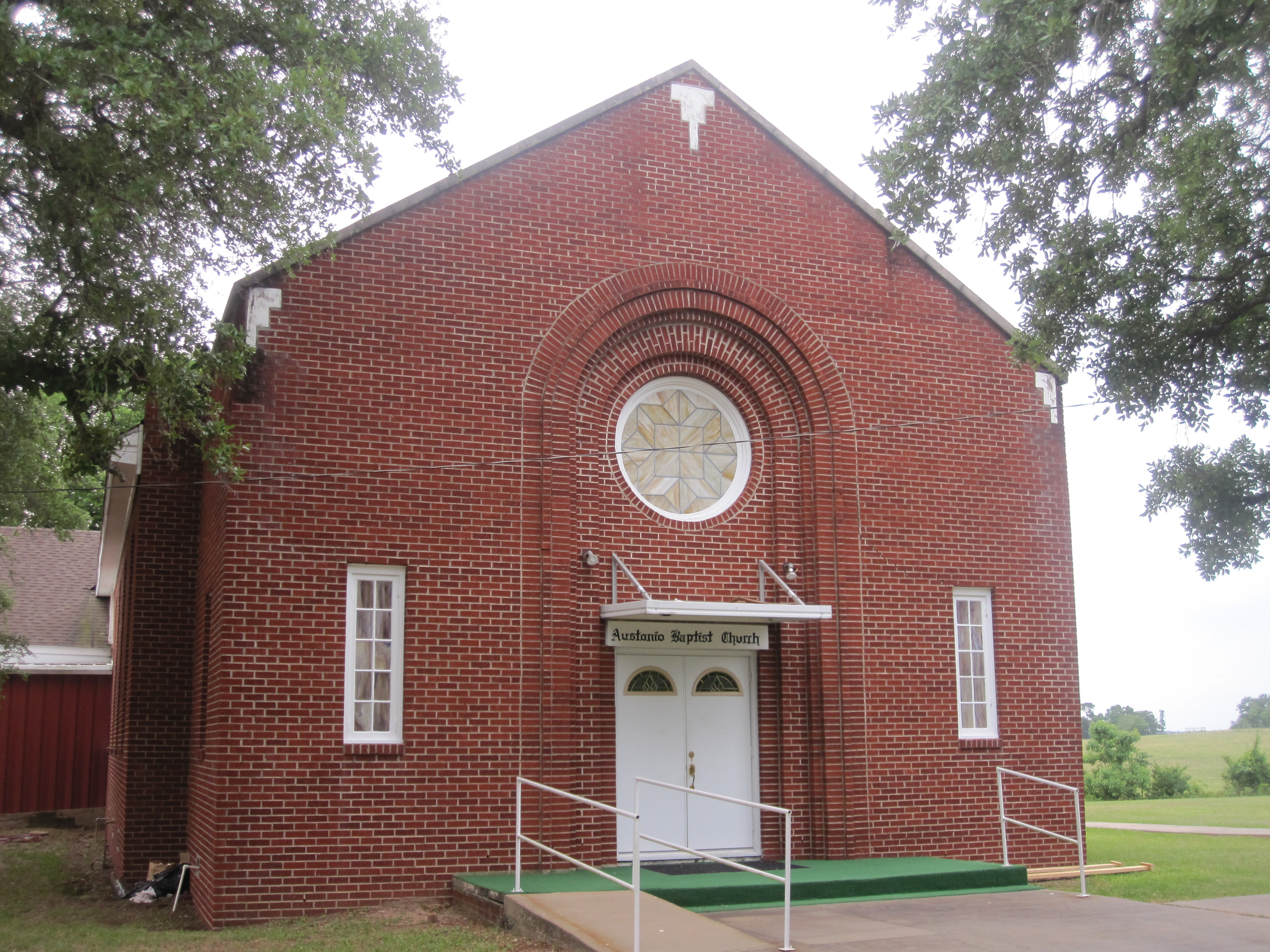
Austonio Baptist Church off Texas State Highway 21 in Houston County

Eastham Unit, a Texas Department of Criminal Justice prison for men, is located in an unincorporated area in the county.

The Crockett State School, a Texas Youth Commission juvenile correctional facility for boys, was located in Crockett. but was closed on August 31, 2011.

United States presidential election results for Houston County, Texas
Year	Republican		Democratic		Third party(ies)	
Year	No.	%	No.	%	No.	%
1912	342	16.23%	1,457	69.15%	308	14.62%
1916	373	16.47%	1,730	76.38%	162	7.15%
1920	385	12.92%	1,475	49.48%	1,121	37.60%
1924	457	12.08%	3,289	86.92%	38	1.00%
1928	763	36.35%	1,336	63.65%	0	0.00%
1932	165	5.07%	3,087	94.84%	3	0.09%
1936	99	3.87%	2,458	96.05%	2	0.08%
1940	474	11.69%	3,579	88.24%	3	0.07%
1944	233	7.41%	2,329	74.03%	584	18.56%
1948	532	17.14%	2,014	64.88%	558	17.98%
1952	2,222	43.35%	2,900	56.57%	4	0.08%
1956	1,941	49.04%	1,998	50.48%	19	0.48%
1960	1,591	36.30%	2,703	61.67%	89	2.03%
1964	1,675	31.22%	3,681	68.60%	10	0.19%
1968	1,391	22.30%	2,782	44.60%	2,064	33.09%
1972	3,317	63.95%	1,844	35.55%	26	0.50%
1976	2,229	41.12%	3,179	58.64%	13	0.24%
1980	2,889	40.44%	4,181	58.52%	74	1.04%
1984	4,542	57.98%	3,275	41.80%	17	0.22%
1988	3,882	50.00%	3,846	49.54%	36	0.46%
1992	3,067	38.24%	3,250	40.52%	1,703	21.23%
1996	3,443	46.28%	3,383	45.48%	613	8.24%
2000	5,308	64.45%	2,833	34.40%	95	1.15%
2004	5,848	66.41%	2,921	33.17%	37	0.42%
2008	5,872	68.09%	2,656	30.80%	96	1.11%
2012	5,880	71.59%	2,265	27.57%	69	0.84%
2016	6,205	74.28%	1,978	23.68%	170	2.04%
2020	7,060	74.72%	2,314	24.49%	74	0.78%
2024	7,247	77.38%	2,065	22.05%	53	0.57%

United States Senate election results for Houston County, Texas1
Year	Republican		Democratic		Third party(ies)	
Year	No.	%	No.	%	No.	%
2024	7,033	75.75%	2,104	22.66%	148	1.59%

United States Senate election results for Houston County, Texas2
Year	Republican		Democratic		Third party(ies)	
Year	No.	%	No.	%	No.	%
2020	6,984	74.82%	2,230	23.89%	120	1.29%

Texas Gubernatorial election results for Houston County
Year	Republican		Democratic		Third party(ies)	
Year	No.	%	No.	%	No.	%
2022	5,726	79.70%	1,399	19.47%	59	0.82%

== Transportation ==
=== Major highways ===
- U.S. Highway 287
- State Highway 7
- State Highway 19
- State Highway 21
- Loop 304

Houston County is served by US Highway 287 and State Highways 7, 19, and 21. All of these highways intersect at the Courthouse Square in downtown Crockett. SH 21 follows the 300-year-old route of Old San Antonio Road. Texas State Highway Loop 304 circles the city of Crockett.

=== Rail ===
Freight rail service is provided by Union Pacific Railroad. The Crockett Depot, built in 1909, has been restored and now serves as the Houston County Museum.

=== Air ===
Houston County Airport (KDKR), located 3 miles east of Crockett on SH 7, features a 4,000-foot runway. On-site aircraft services are provided by East Texas Aircraft.

=== Public transportation ===
Demand and response public transportation within Houston County is provided by Brazos Transit District.

== Communities ==
=== Cities ===
- Crockett (county seat)
- Grapeland
- Kennard
- Latexo
- Lovelady

=== Unincorporated communities ===
- Ash
- Augusta
- Austonio
- Belott
- Berea
- Burrantown
- Center Hill
- Cooper
- Creath
- Fodice
- Germany
- Hagerville
- Hickory Creek
- Holly
- Hopewell
- Lone Pine
- Mapleton
- Mound City‡
- Pennington‡
- Percilla
- Porter Springs
- Ratcliff
- Refuge
- Reynard
- Stubblefield
- Tadmor
- Weches
- Weldon

=== Ghost towns ===
- Allen Chapel
- Antioch
- Arbor Grove
- Center Grove
- Coltharp
- Creek
- Cut
- Druso
- Easley Chapel
- Elkins
- Givens Hill
- Guiceland
- Halls Bluff
- Liberty Hill
- Livelyville
- Mount Vernon
- Pearson's Chapel
- Plain
- Plainview
- Pleasant Grove
- Pleasant Hill
- Post Oak
- Prairie Point
- Randolph
- San Pedro
- Sand Ridge
- Shady Grove
- Shiloh
- Smith Grove
- Sorghumville
- Vistula
- Volga
- Waneta
- Wesley Chapel
- Wheeler Springs

== Education ==
Five school districts are located entirely in the county:

- Crockett Independent School District
- Lovelady Independent School District
- Kennard Independent School District
- Latexo Independent School District
- Grapeland Independent School District

In addition, small portions of Groveton Independent School District and Elkhart Independent School District, located in Trinity County and Anderson County, respectively, extend into Houston County.

The county is in the district for Angelina College.

== See also ==
- Museums in East Texas
- National Register of Historic Places listings in Houston County, Texas
- Recorded Texas Historic Landmarks in Houston County
- Wet counties
