= Latexo Independent School District =

School district in Texas, United States

Address
- 298 FM 2663 Latexo, Texas, 75849; United States

District information
- Type: Public
- Grades: PK–12
- Schools: 2
- NCES District ID: 4826910

Students and staff
- Students: 497 (2023–2024)
- Teachers: 42.33 (on an FTE basis) (2023–2024)
- Staff: 46.43 (on an FTE basis) (2023–2024)
- Student–teacher ratio: 11.74 (2023–2024)

Other information
- Website: www.latexoisd.net

Latexo Independent School District is a public school district based in Latexo, Texas, in the U.S. state of Texas. In addition to serving the city of Latexo, it also serves unincorporated north-central Houston County and a small portion of the nearby city of Crockett.

The district has two campuses - Latexo High (grades 7–12) and Latexo Elementary (prekindergarten-grade 6).

In 2009, the school district was rated "academically acceptable" by the Texas Education Agency.

== History ==
In 2020 the district began designating Fridays as "flex days".

== Controversy ==
In July 2024, the ACLU of Texas sent Latexo Independent School District a letter, alleging that the district's 2023-2024 dress and grooming code appeared to violate the Texas CROWN Act, a state law which prohibits racial discrimination based on hair texture or styles, and asking the district to revise its policies for the 2024-2025 school year.
