= Kennard, Texas =

- City
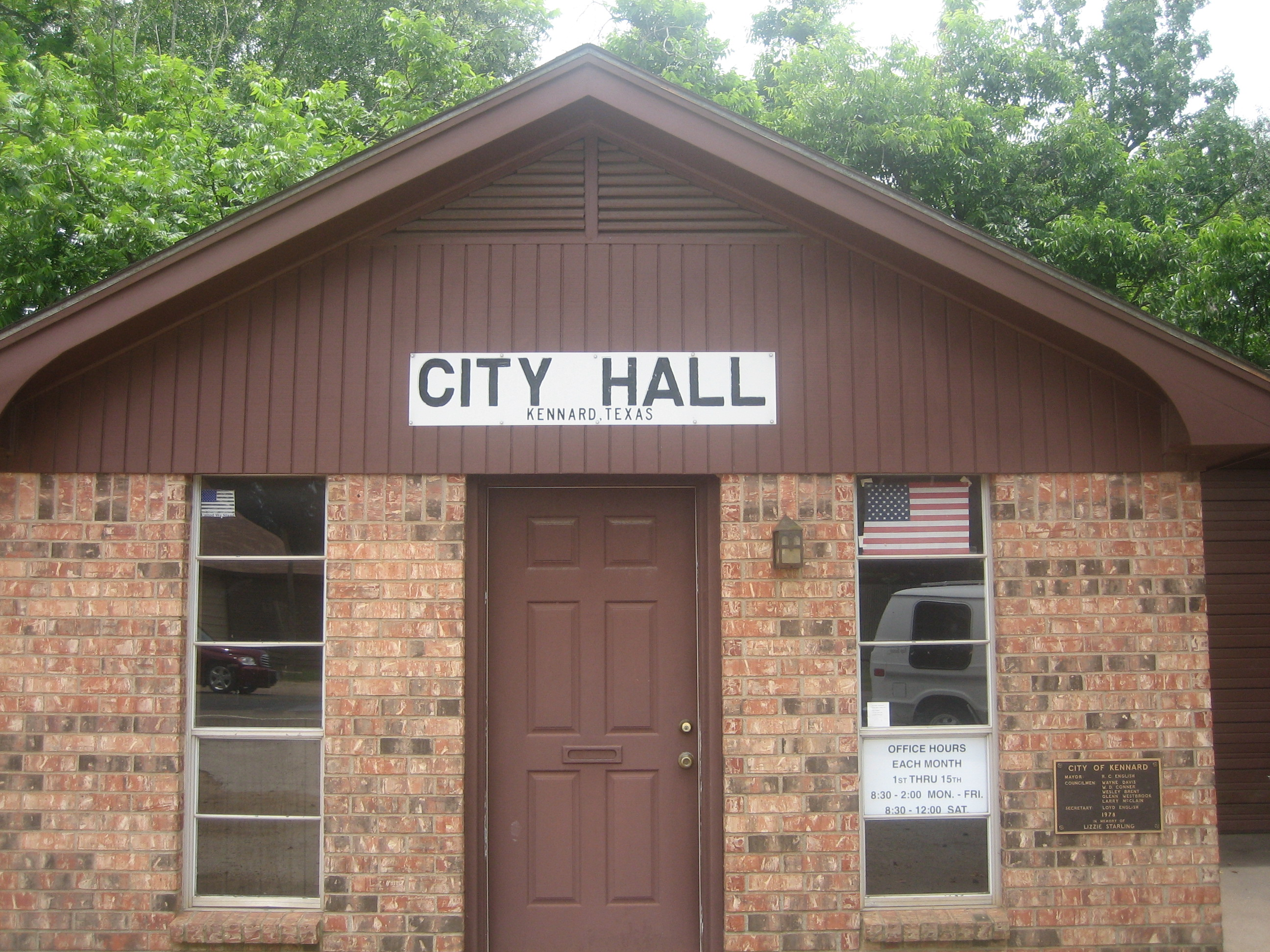
- Kennard City Hall building (established 1978)

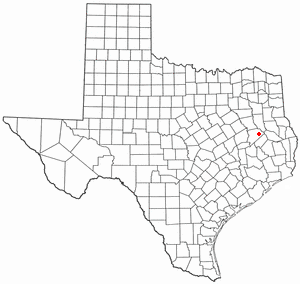
- Location of Kennard, Texas

- Coordinates: 31°21′27″N 95°11′07″W
- Country: United States
- State: Texas
- County: Houston

Area
  - Total: 1.30 sq mi (3.36 km^{2})
  - Land: 1.30 sq mi (3.36 km^{2})
  - Water: 0 sq mi (0.00 km^{2})
- Elevation: 351 ft (107 m)

Population (2020)
  - Total: 272
  - Density: 210/sq mi (81.0/km^{2})
- Time zone: UTC-6 (Central (CST))
  - Summer (DST): UTC-5 (CDT)
- ZIP code: 75847
- Area code: 936
- FIPS code: 48-38884
- GNIS feature ID: 2410182
- Website: cityofkennard.com

Kennard (/kəˈnɑːrd/ kə-NARD) is a city in Houston County, Texas, United States. Its population was 272 at the 2020 census. The main street is Texas State Highway 7.

== Geography ==
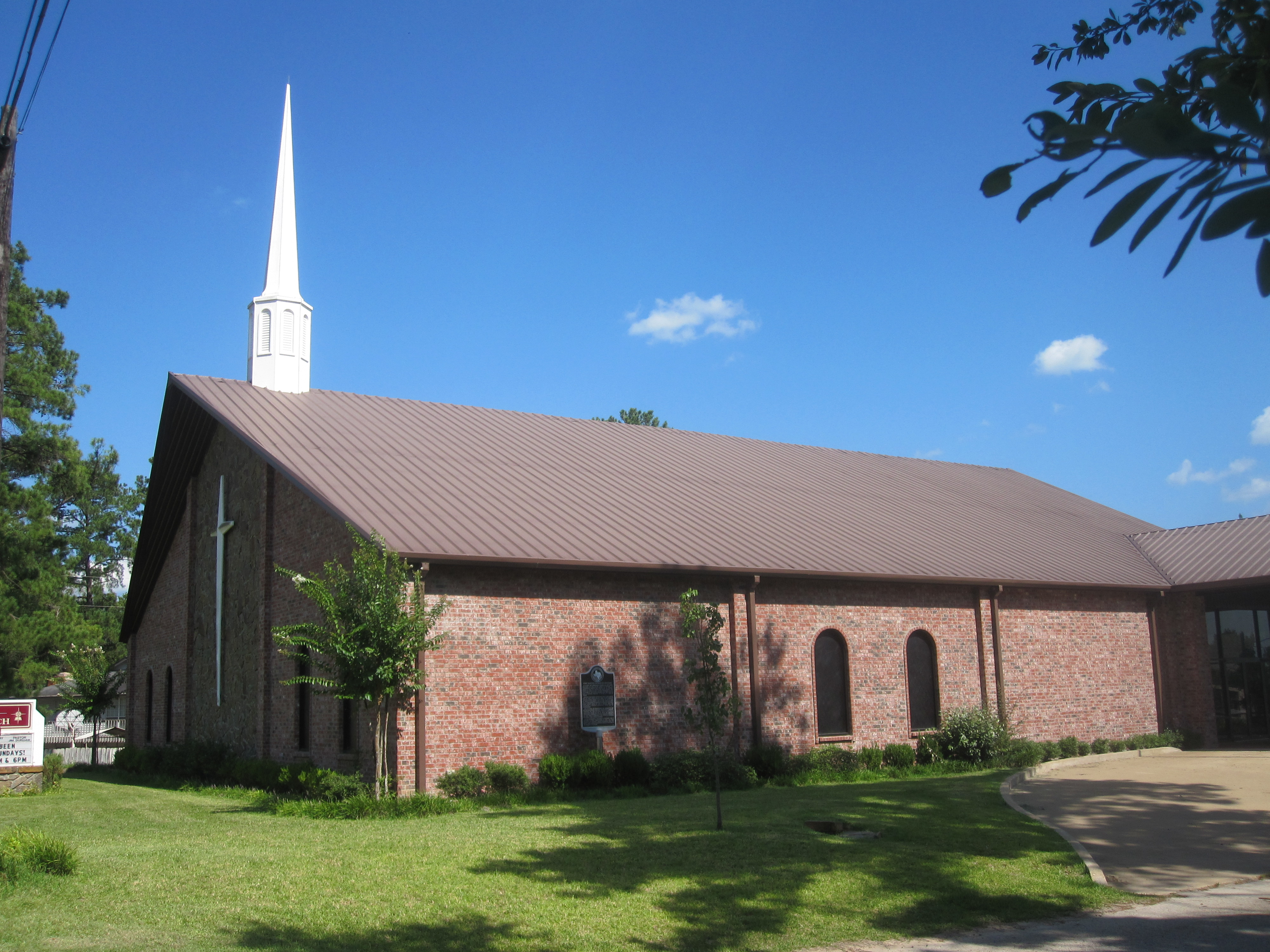
First Baptist Church of Kennard was formerly active in the prohibitionist movement.

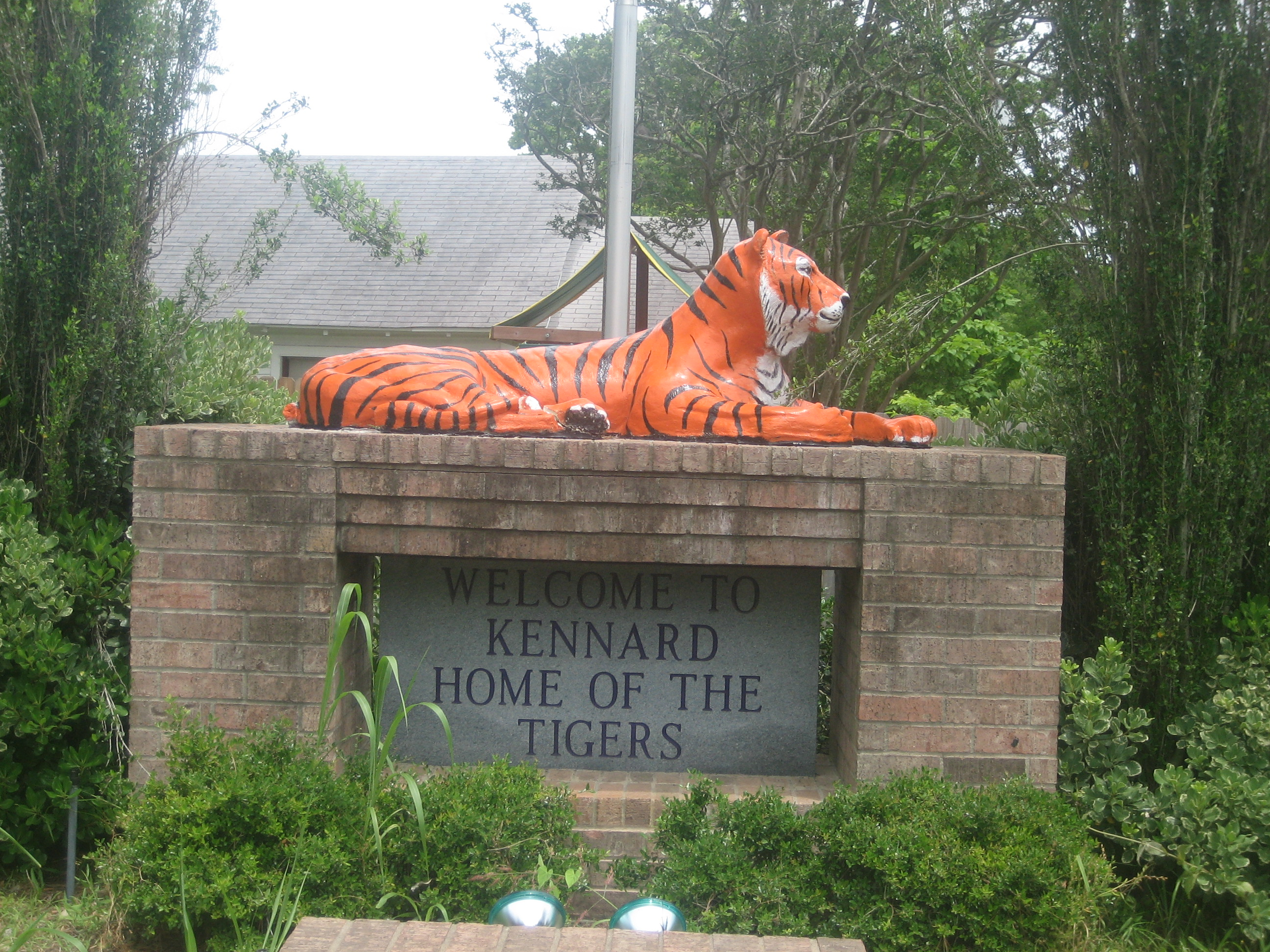
Kennard High School Tigers exhibit

Kennard is located in eastern Houston County and is surrounded by Davy Crockett National Forest. State Highway 7 leads west 16 miles (26 km) to Crockett, the county seat, and northeast 37 miles (60 km) to Nacogdoches.

According to the United States Census Bureau, the city has a total area of 1.3 square miles (3.4 km^{2}), all land. The city is drained by forks of Cochino Bayou, an eastward-flowing tributary of the Neches River.

=== Climate ===
The climate in this area is characterized by hot, humid summers and generally mild to cool winters. According to the Köppen climate classification, Kennard has a humid subtropical climate, Cfa on climate maps.

== Demographics ==
Historical population
Census	Pop.	Note	%±
1970	448		—
1980	424		−5.4%
1990	341		−19.6%
2000	317		−7.0%
2010	337		6.3%
2020	272		−19.3%
U.S. Decennial Census; 2020 Census

=== 2020 census ===
As of the 2020 census, Kennard had a population of 272 and a median age of 41.5 years. 21.0% of residents were under the age of 18 and 19.1% of residents were 65 years of age or older.

For every 100 females there were 97.1 males, and for every 100 females age 18 and over there were 104.8 males age 18 and over.

There were 116 households in Kennard, of which 37.9% had children under the age of 18 living in them. Of all households, 42.2% were married-couple households, 25.9% were households with a male householder and no spouse or partner present, and 27.6% were households with a female householder and no spouse or partner present. About 27.6% of all households were made up of individuals and 9.5% had someone living alone who was 65 years of age or older.

There were 157 housing units, of which 26.1% were vacant. The homeowner vacancy rate was 5.7% and the rental vacancy rate was 17.1%.

0.0% of residents lived in urban areas, while 100.0% lived in rural areas.

Racial composition as of the 2020 census
Race	Number	Percent
White	187	68.8%
Black or African American	51	18.8%
American Indian and Alaska Native	2	0.7%
Asian	0	0.0%
Native Hawaiian and Other Pacific Islander	0	0.0%
Some other race	1	0.4%
Two or more races	31	11.4%
Hispanic or Latino (of any race)	20	7.4%

=== 2000 census ===
As of the 2000 census, 317 people, 123 households, and 83 families were residing in the city. The population density was 250.5 inhabitants per square mile (96.7/km^{2}). The 159 housing units averaged 125.7/mi^{2} (48.3/km^{2}). The racial makeup of the city was 74.45% White, 21.77% African American, 0.95% Asian, 1.58% from other races, and 1.26% from two or more races. Hispanics or Latinos of any race were 2.84% of the population.

Of the 123 households, 30.9% had children under the age of 18 living with them, 48.0% were married couples living together, 13.0% had a female householder with no husband present, and 32.5% were not families. About 30.1% of all households were made up of individuals, and 13.8% had someone living alone who was 65 years of age or older. The average household size was 2.58, and the average family size was 3.17.

In the city, the age distribution was 28.4% under 18, 12.0% from 18 to 24, 25.2% from 25 to 44, 22.7% from 45 to 64, and 11.7% who were 65 or older. The median age was 33 years. For every 100 females, there were 93.3 males. For every 100 females age 18 and over, there were 94.0 males.

The median income for a household in the city was $28,125, and for a family was $37,917. Males had a median income of $24,722 versus $25,625 for females. The per capita income for the city was $19,354. About 16.4% of families and 24.3% of the population were below the poverty line, including 39.7% of those under age 18 and 23.7% of those age 65 or older.

== Education ==
The city is served by the Kennard Independent School District. The Kennard High School teams are known as the Tigers.
