= Grapeland, Texas =

- City
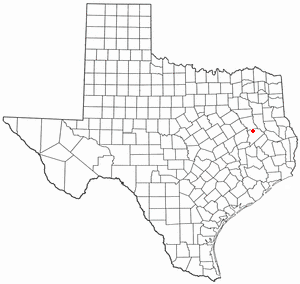
- Location of Grapeland, Texas

- Coordinates: 31°29′55″N 95°28′34″W
- Country: United States
- State: Texas
- County: Houston
- Settled: 1872
- Established: 1899

Area
  - Total: 2.59 sq mi (6.70 km^{2})
  - Land: 2.58 sq mi (6.68 km^{2})
  - Water: 0.012 sq mi (0.03 km^{2})
- Elevation: 459 ft (140 m)

Population (2020)
  - Total: 1,465
  - Density: 559.8/sq mi (216.15/km^{2})
- Time zone: UTC-6 (Central (CST))
  - Summer (DST): UTC-5 (CDT)
- ZIP code: 75844
- Area code: 936
- FIPS code: 48-30632
- GNIS feature ID: 2410649
- Website: grapeland.texas.gov

Grapeland is a city in Houston County, Texas, United States. Its population was 1,465 as of the 2020 census.

== Geography ==
According to the United States Census Bureau, the city has a total area of 2.0 square miles (5.2 km^{2}), of which 2.0 square miles (5.2 km^{2}) are land and 0.50% is covered by water.

Grapeland is 60 miles (97 km) west of Lufkin.

=== Climate ===
The climate in this area is characterized by hot, humid summers and generally mild to cool winters. According to the Köppen climate classification, Grapeland has a humid subtropical climate, Cfa on climate maps.

== History ==
The site of Grapeland became a destination for pioneers circa 1872, due to the establishment of the Houston and Great Northern Railroad Company. In particular, it became a crossroads between routes from Trinity to Augusta, and from Palestine to Crockett. Originally, the town was called "Grapevine", referring to the vines that had to be cut to make way for the railway tracks.

== Demographics ==
Historical population
Census	Pop.	Note	%±
1880	88		—
1930	1,027		—
1940	1,327		29.2%
1950	1,358		2.3%
1960	1,113		−18.0%
1970	1,211		8.8%
1980	1,634		34.9%
1990	1,450		−11.3%
2000	1,451		0.1%
2010	1,489		2.6%
2020	1,465		−1.6%
U.S. Decennial Census

=== Racial and ethnic composition ===
Racial composition as of the 2020 census
Race	Number	Percent
White	850	58.0%
Black or African American	491	33.5%
American Indian and Alaska Native	4	0.3%
Asian	12	0.8%
Native Hawaiian and Other Pacific Islander	0	0.0%
Some other race	17	1.2%
Two or more races	91	6.2%
Hispanic or Latino (of any race)	64	4.4%

=== 2020 census ===
As of the 2020 census, Grapeland had a population of 1,465. The median age was 43.3 years. 22.7% of residents were under the age of 18 and 22.8% of residents were 65 years of age or older. For every 100 females there were 90.3 males, and for every 100 females age 18 and over there were 83.3 males age 18 and over.

0.0% of residents lived in urban areas, while 100.0% lived in rural areas.

There were 593 households in Grapeland, of which 32.0% had children under the age of 18 living in them. Of all households, 39.6% were married-couple households, 18.7% were households with a male householder and no spouse or partner present, and 38.4% were households with a female householder and no spouse or partner present. About 31.5% of all households were made up of individuals and 17.2% had someone living alone who was 65 years of age or older.

There were 743 housing units, of which 20.2% were vacant. The homeowner vacancy rate was 3.6% and the rental vacancy rate was 7.7%.

=== 2000 census ===
As of the census of 2000, 1,451 people, 583 households, and 377 families were residing in the city. The population density was 733.5 people/sq mi (282.9/km^{2}). The 726 housing units averaged 367.0/sq mi (141.6/km^{2}). The racial makeup of the city was 63.27% White, 34.94% African American, 0.62% Native American, 1.00% from other races, and 0.21% from two or more races. Hispanics or Latinos of any race were 1.65% of the population.

Of the 583 households, 27.8% had children under the age of 18 living with them, 43.1% were married couples living together, 19.2% had a female householder with no husband present, and 35.2% were not families. About 34.3% of all households were made up of individuals, and 20.6% had someone living alone who was 65 years of age or older. The average household size was 2.39, and the average family size was 3.08.

In the city, the age distribution was 26.4% under 18, 7.1% from 18 to 24, 21.2% from 25 to 44, 20.7% from 45 to 64, and 24.6% who were 65 or older. The median age was 42 years. For every 100 females, there were 79.8 males. For every 100 females age 18 and over, there were 71.7 males.

The median income for a household in the city was $22,361, and for a family was $30,250. Males had a median income of $26,964 versus $18,906 for females. The per capita income for the city was $13,736. About 20.4% of families and 23.5% of the population were below the poverty line, including 29.2% of those under age 18 and 19.0% of those age 65 or over.

== Education ==
The City of Grapeland is served by the Grapeland Independent School District and home of the Grapeland Sandies.

== Notable people ==
- Napoleon Beazley, executed for a murder committed at age 17
- Tony Jones, NFL player for four seasons, including Houston Oilers in 1990
- Ruth J. Simmons, former president of Prairie View A&M University, Brown University and Smith College.

== See also ==
- Pleasant Hill, a ghost town near Grapeland
- Salmon Lake Park
