= Lovelady Independent School District =

School district in Texas, United States

Address
- 11839 Texas State Highway 19 South Lovelady, Texas, 75851; United States

District information
- Type: Public
- Grades: PreK–12
- NCES District ID: 4828410

Students and staff
- Students: 512
- Teachers: 49.41 (FTE)
- Staff: 36.83
- Student–teacher ratio: 10.36

Other information
- Website: www.loveladyisd.net

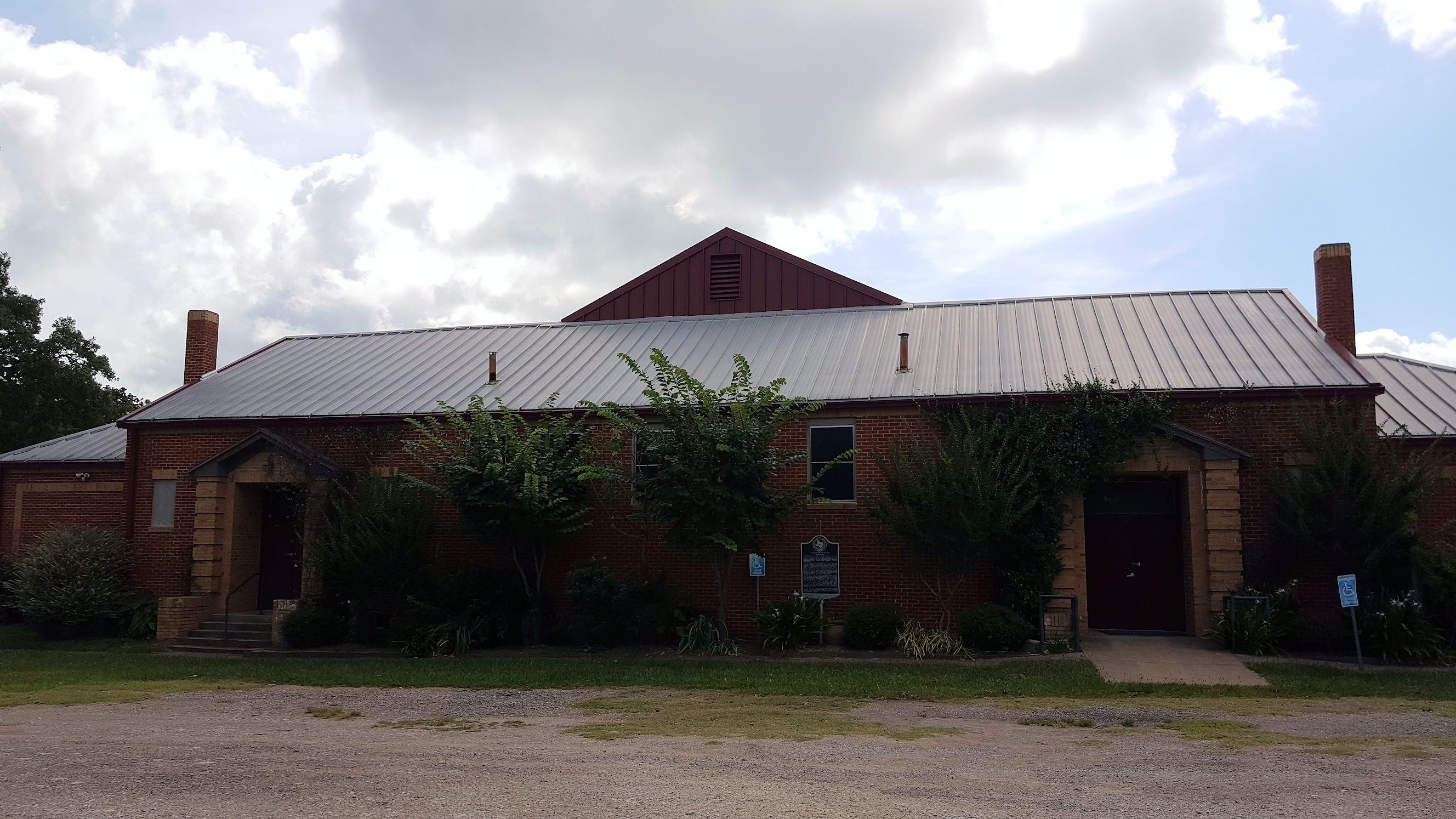
Building of the former school site, known to locals as the "old gym"; now used for events.

Lovelady Independent School District is a public school district based in Lovelady, Texas (USA), located within Houston County.

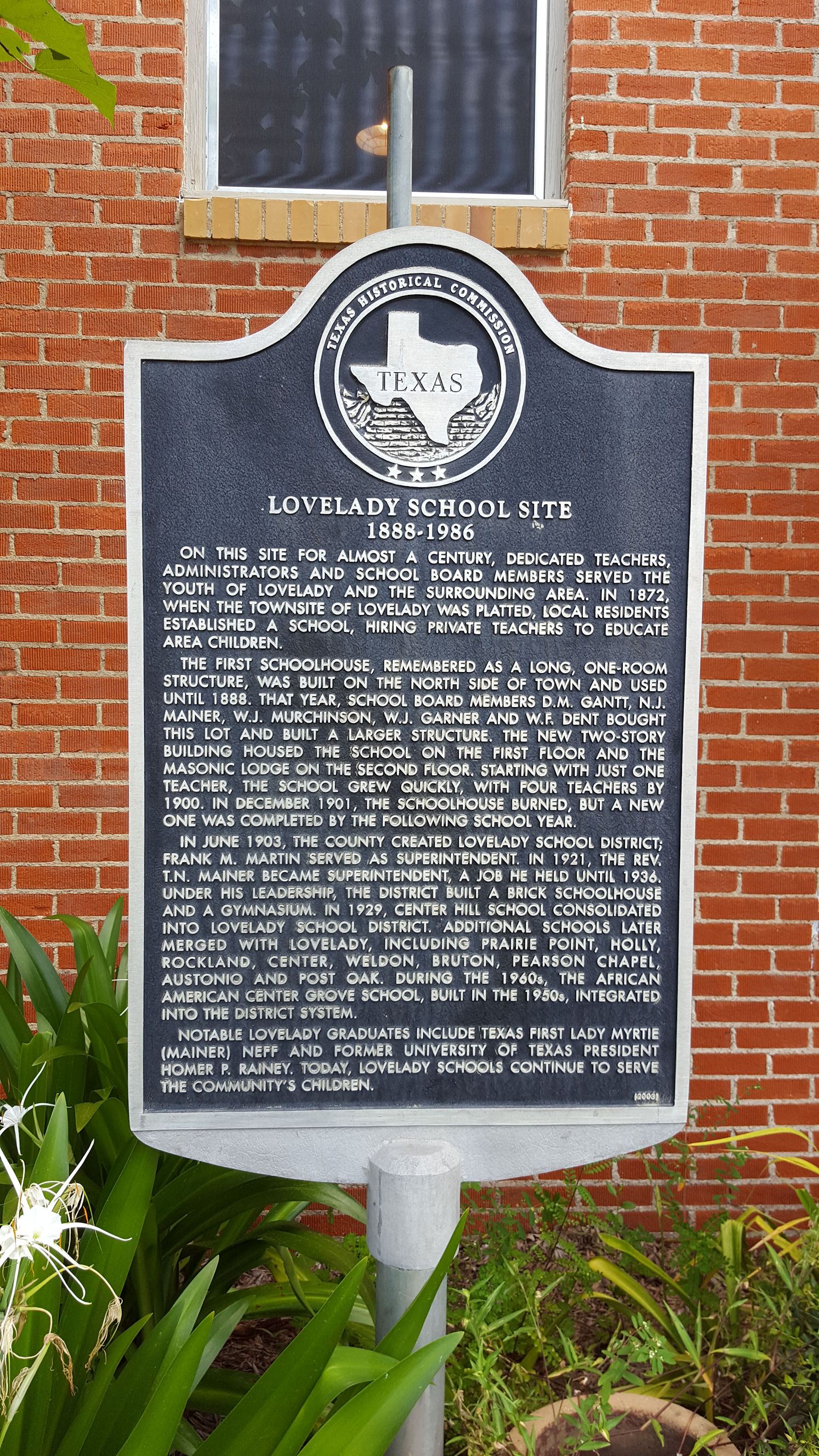
Historical marker for former school site

The district has two campuses - Lovelady Junior High/High School (Grades 7-12) and Lovelady Elementary/Middle School (Grades PK-8).

In 2009, the school district was rated "recognized" by the Texas Education Agency.

On April 13, 2014, there was minor damage at the High School after a tornado ripped through the town.

Lovelady ISD is one of the few districts in Texas that does not allow out of district transfers, with the exception of children of nonresident employees.

== Consolidations ==
Lovelady consolidated with Pearson Chapel, Weldon, Cutt, Austonio, and Creek Schools, all during World War II except Austionio, which was in 1964.
