= Grapeland Independent School District =

School district in Texas, United States

Address
- 116 West Myrtle Grapeland, Texas, 75844; United States

District information
- Type: Public
- Grades: PK–12
- Schools: 3
- NCES District ID: 4821630

Students and staff
- Students: 598 (2023–2024)
- Teachers: 56.08 (on an FTE basis) (2023–2024)
- Staff: 75.55 (on an FTE basis) (2023–2024)
- Student–teacher ratio: 10.66 (2023–2024)

Other information
- Website: www.grapelandisd.net

Grapeland Independent School District is a public school district based in Grapeland, Texas (USA).

In 2009, the school district was rated "academically acceptable" by the Texas Education Agency.

== Schools ==
- Grapeland High School (Grades 9-12)
- Grapeland Junior High (Grades 7-8)
- Grapeland Elementary (Grades PK-6)
