= Crockett Independent School District =

School district in Texas, United States

Address
- 1400 West Austin Street Crockett, Texas, 75835; United States

District information
- Type: Public
- Grades: PK–12
- Schools: 4
- NCES District ID: 4815720

Students and staff
- Students: 1,183 (2023–2024)
- Teachers: 83.89 (on an FTE basis) (2023–2024)
- Staff: 107.21 (on an FTE basis) (2023–2024)
- Student–teacher ratio: 14.10 (2023–2024)

Other information
- Website: www.crockettisd.net

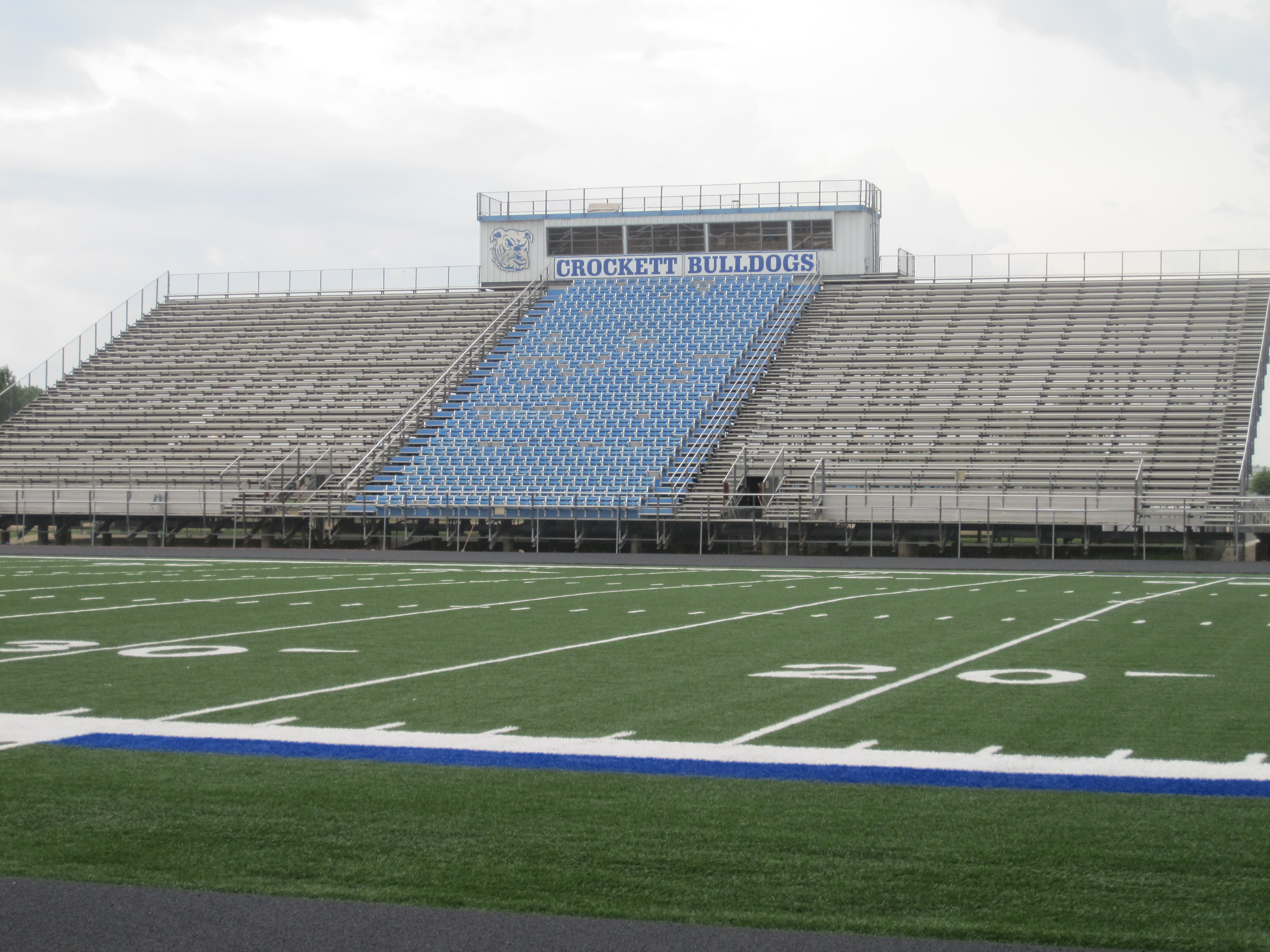
Crockett High School Bulldogs play their home games in this stadium. The track around the field was refurbished in the spring of 2010.

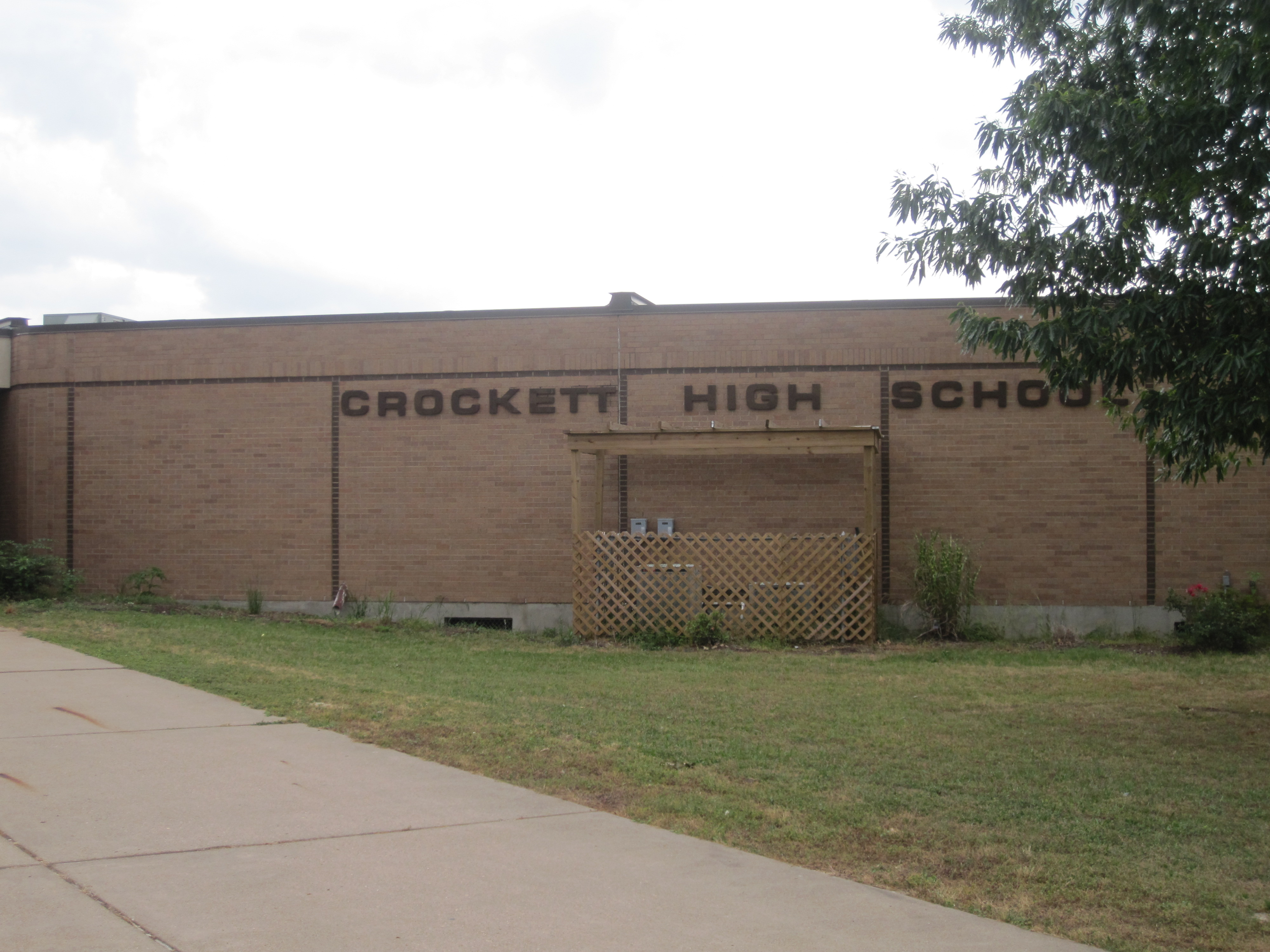
Crockett High School

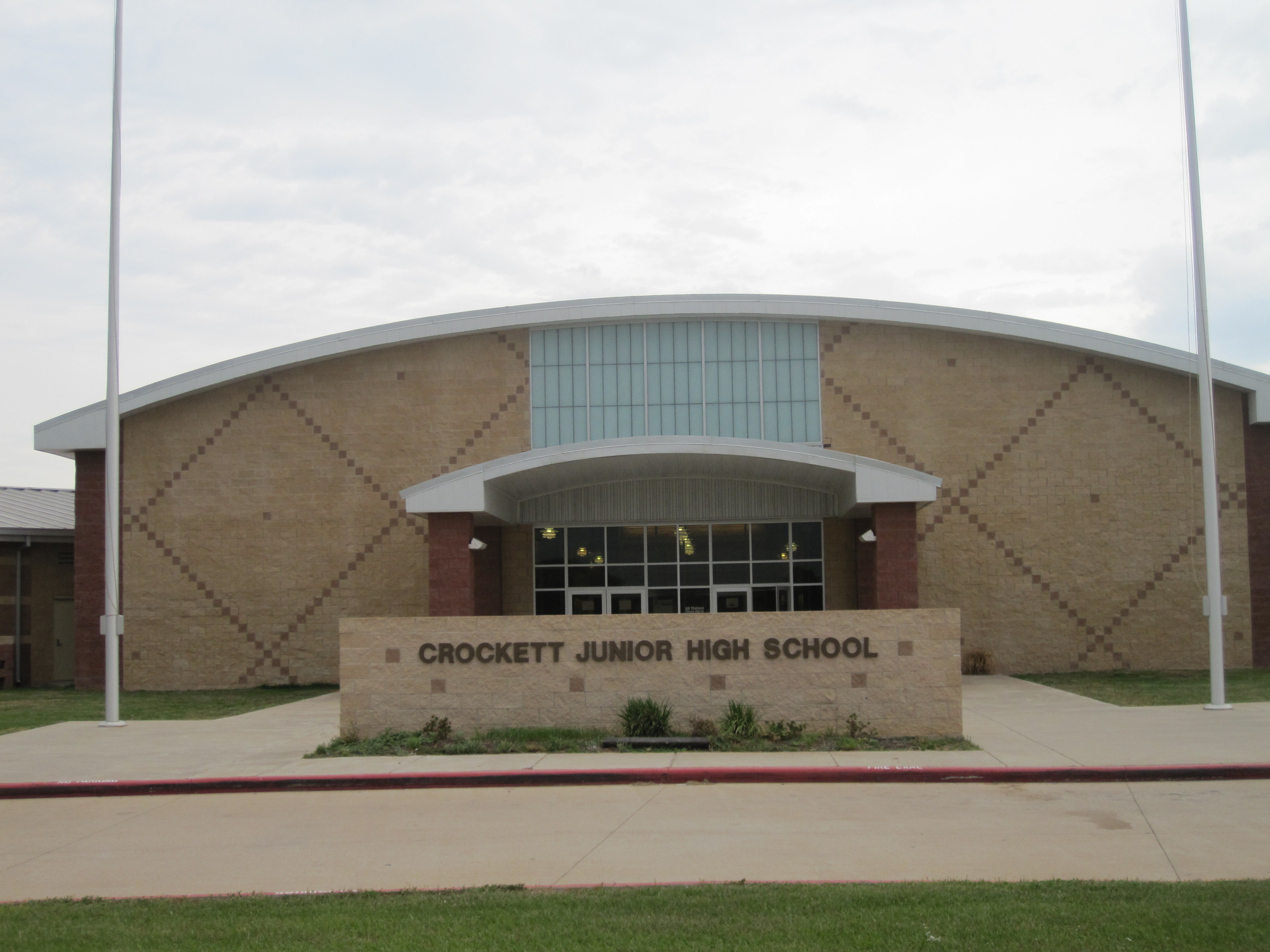
The newer Crockett Junior High School campus is adjacent to the high school.

Crockett Independent School District is a public school district based in Crockett, Texas (USA).

In 2009, the school district was rated "academically acceptable" by the Texas Education Agency.

== Schools ==
- Crockett High School (Grades 9-12)
- Crockett Junior High School (Grades 6-8)
- Crockett Elementary School (Grades 1-5)
- Early Childhood Center (Grades PK-K)
