= Kennard Independent School District =

School district in Texas, United States

Address
- 304 Highway Seven East Kennard, Texas, 75847; United States

District information
- Type: Public
- Grades: PK–12
- Schools: 1
- NCES District ID: 4825470

Students and staff
- Students: 267 (2023–2024)
- Teachers: 22.91 (on an FTE basis) (2023–2024)
- Staff: 24.81 (on an FTE basis) (2023–2024)
- Student–teacher ratio: 11.65 (2023–2024)

Other information
- Website: www.kennardisd.net

Kennard Independent School District is a public school district based in Kennard, Texas, United States. It has two campuses - Kennard High School (grades 7-12) and Kennard Elementary School (kindergarten-grade 6). It is mostly located in Houston County, and a small portion goes into Trinity County.

In 2009, the school district was rated "academically acceptable" by the Texas Education Agency.
