= U.S. Route 287 in Texas =

Highway in Texas

U.S. Highway 287
- US 287 highlighted in red

Route information
- Auxiliary route of US 87
- Maintained by TxDOT
- Length: 659.1 mi (Note: Length does not account for concurrencies along Interstate Highways and U.S. Highways with lower numbers) (1,060.7 km)
- Existed: 1942–present

Major junctions
- South end: US 69 / US 96 / SH 87 in Port Arthur
- I-10 in Beaumont; Future I-69 / US 59 in Corrigan; I-45 in Corsicana; I-35E in Waxahachie; I-20 in Arlington; I-20 / I-820 in Fort Worth; I-30 in Fort Worth; I-35W / US 81 in Fort Worth; I-44 / US 277 / US 281 in Wichita Falls; I-40 in Amarillo
- North end: US 287 near Kerrick

Location
- Country: United States
- State: Texas
- Counties: Jefferson, Hardin, Tyler, Polk, Trinity, Houston, Anderson, Freestone, Navarro, Ellis, Johnson, Tarrant, Wise, Montague, Clay, Wichita, Wilbarger, Hardeman, Childress, Hall, Donley, Armstrong, Carson, Potter, Moore, Sherman, Dallam

Highway system
- United States Numbered Highway System; List; Special; Divided; Highways in Texas; Interstate; US; State; Former; Toll; Loops; Spurs; FM/RM; Park; Rec
← SH 286	→ SH 287
← SH 105	SH 106	→ SH 107
← SH 229	SH 230	→ SH 231

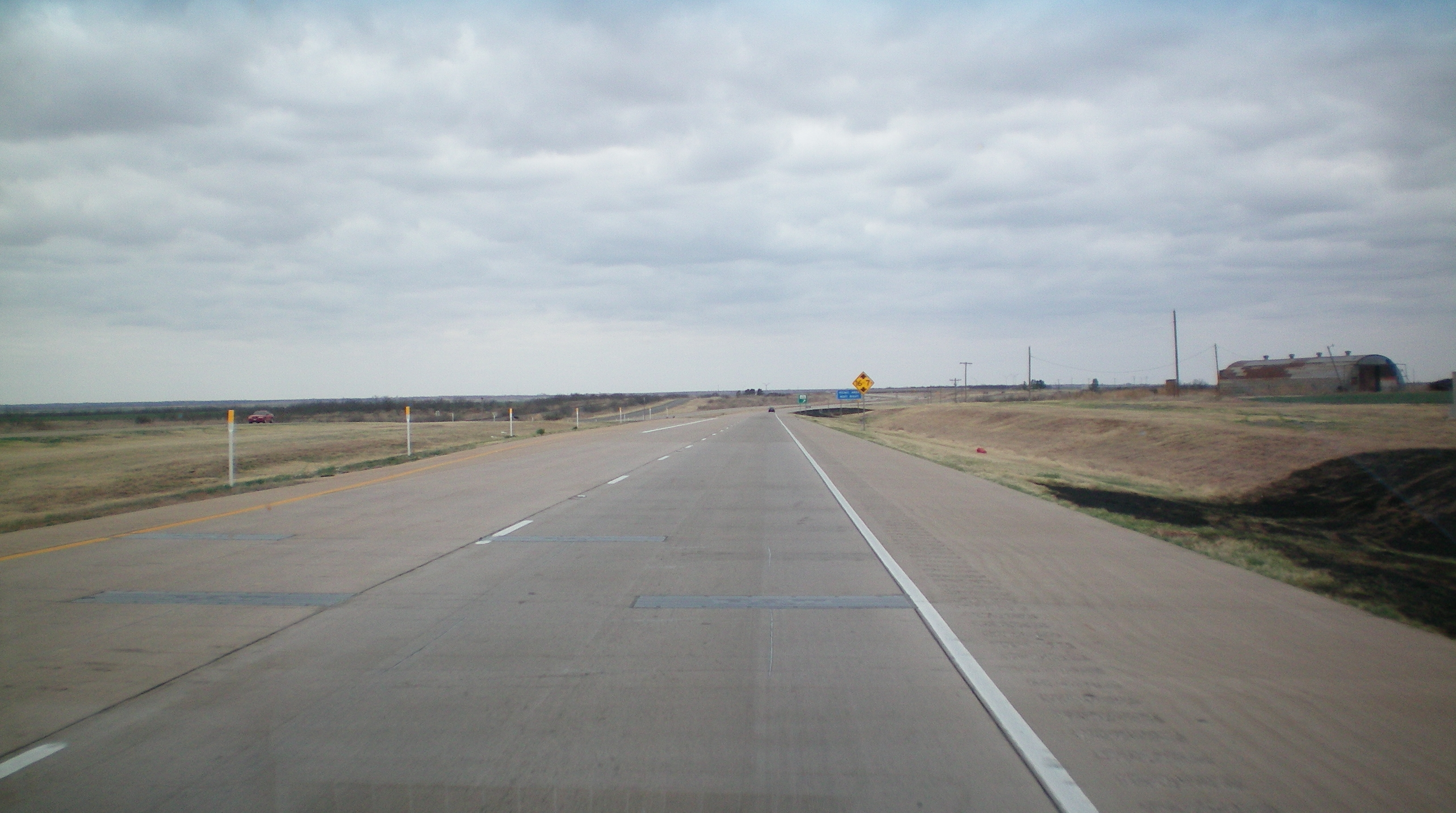
U.S. Route 287 in North Texas

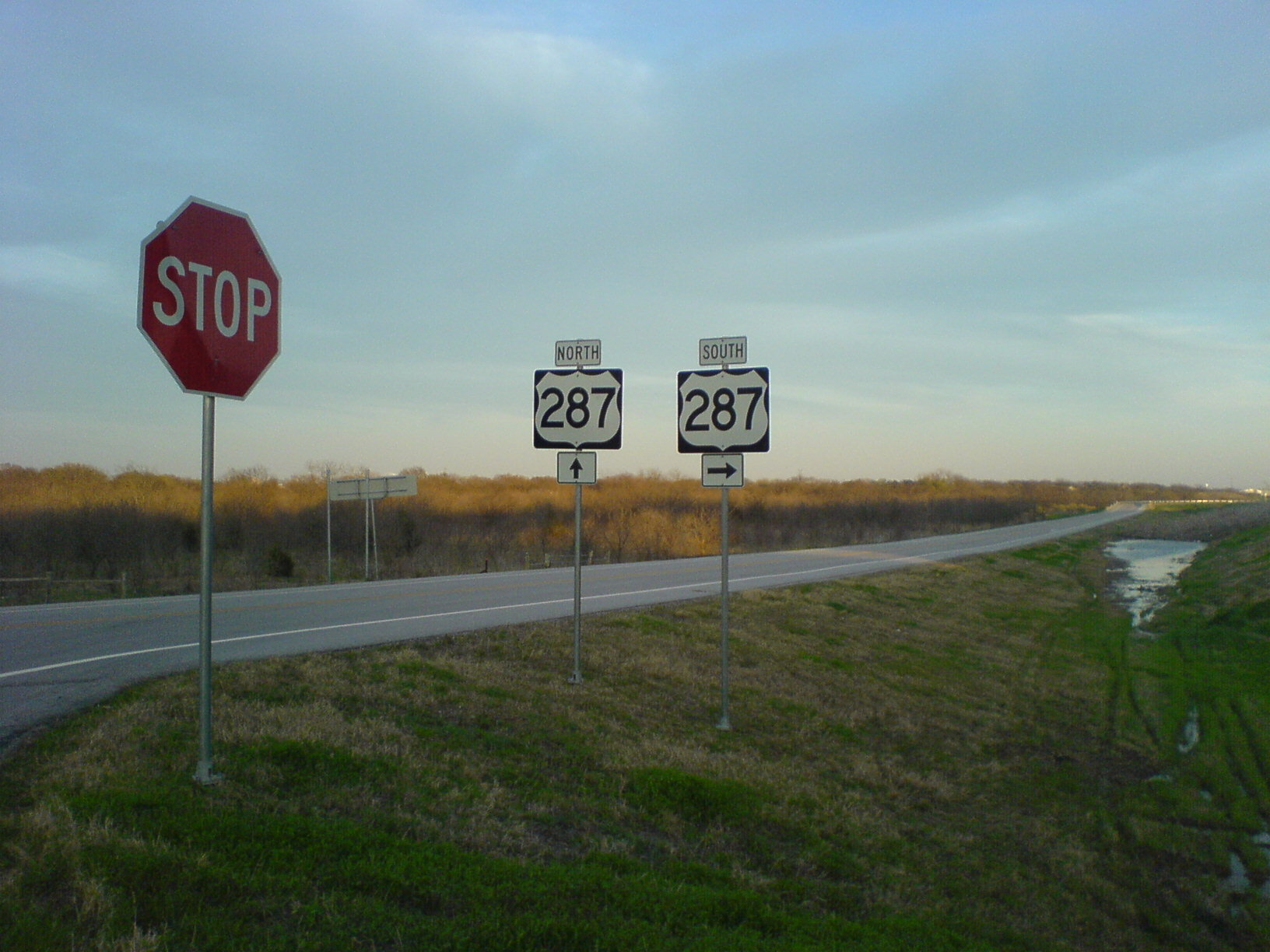
U.S. Route 287 near Midlothian

U.S. Highway 287 (US 287) in the U.S. state of Texas is a major U.S. Highway that begins on the Gulf Coast in Port Arthur and heads north through Fort Worth, northwest to Childress, Clarendon, Wichita Falls, and Amarillo in the Texas Panhandle and into Oklahoma near Kerrick.

== Route description ==
US 287 begins at the intersection of Woodworth Boulevard and SH 87 in Port Arthur and runs northwest, running concurrent with US 69 and US 96. At the cloverleaf interchange with SH 73, the route becomes a freeway and remains so heading towards I-10 in Beaumont. It runs concurrent with I-10 heading through Beaumont until separating from the interstate north of the city. In Lumberton, US 287 separates from US 96, remaining concurrent with US 69 until reaching Woodville, where it splits after intersecting US 190.

The highway continues northwest, running through Chester and intersecting US 59 in Corrigan. In Crockett, US 287 becomes concurrent with SH 19 and remains so until reaching Palestine, where it splits from the state highway northwest of town. The route continues west, passing by the Richland-Chambers Reservoir until reaching I-45 in Corsicana. It remains concurrent with I-45 until reaching exit 247 southeast of Ennis and heading west. In Waxahachie, the highway interchanges US 77 and I-35E.

In Midlothian, it interchanges with US 67 before continuing northwest as a freeway towards the Dallas–Fort Worth metroplex, heading through Mansfield. The route then reaches I-20 northeast of Kennedale and runs concurrent with I-20 until reaching I-820, where it runs concurrent with the beltway for about 1.5 miles (2.4 km). The highway then runs northwest toward Fort Worth, also known as the Martin Luther King Jr. Freeway. Near downtown Fort Worth, the highway interchanges with I-30 and runs concurrent with Spur 280 until reaching I-35W, where it runs concurrent with it until exit 60 north of I-820.

The route continues northwest, running concurrent with US 81 and remains as a freeway. It loops around Rhome and is concurrent with SH 114 for about 1.3 miles (2.1 km). It then runs through Decatur and interchanges US 380. It continues northwest until separating from US 81 in Bowie. In Henrietta, US 287 becomes concurrent with US 82. In Wichita Falls, the route interchanges and becomes concurrent with US 281 and becomes concurrent as well as US 277 heading through the city. US 82 splits from US 287 at the US 277 interchange. I-44 begins at Bellevue Park and the route remains concurrent with it until reaching Spur 325, where it becomes independent while US 277 and US 281 remains concurrent with I-44. The highway then passes through Iowa Park, Electra, and Harrold. In Oklaunion, the route becomes concurrent with US 183 and US 70. US 183 separates at the US 283 interchange and US 70 separates from US 287 west of Vernon. The highway continues northwest, heading toward Amarillo. In Childress, the highway intersects US 62 and US 83.

Between Childress and Amarillo, US 287 passes through Estelline. The reduction of the speed limit from 70 mph (110 km/h) to 50 mph (80 km/h) at the city limits has given the city the reputation of being a speed trap.

In Amarillo, the highway runs concurrent with I-40 until reaching I-27, becoming concurrent with US 60 and US 87 heading through downtown. US 60 becomes concurrent with I-40 Business while US 87 and US 287 continues north. US 287 splits from US 87 in Dumas. The highway continues north through Cactus and intersects US 54 in Stratford. The route continues northwest and crosses into Oklahoma from Kerrick.

== History ==
When US 287 was first commissioned in 1935, none of its route was in Texas. The route was extended southward from Colorado to the Gulf Coast at Port Arthur, Texas in 1939. Before this extension, the portion from the Oklahoma state line to Amarillo was SH 9, from Amarillo to Henrietta was SH 5, Henrietta to Bowie was SH 50, Bowie to Fort Worth was SH 2 and US 81, Fort Worth to Ennis SH 34, Ennis to Corsicana was SH 14/US 75, Corsicana to Palestine was SH 22, Palestine to Crockett was SH 19, Crockett and Woodville was Texas State Highway 106, Woodville to Port Arthur was SH 8.

From 1926 to 1939, the aforementioned state routes between US 66 in Claude and US 81 in Bowie were co-designated with U.S. Route 370, which was commissioned in 1926. US 370 was extended westward to Amarillo by 1935 with the northward relocation of US 66. This route also traveled concurrently with US 70 between Vernon and Wichita Falls, Texas. With the 1939 general re-description of the Texas State Highway system all of the state highway designations were removed and US 370 was decommissioned from Oklahoma state line to Port Arthur. SH 106 was decommissioned entirely.

== Future ==
Future Interstate 47
- Location: Port Arthur–Choteau, Montana
- Length: 1,791 mi (2,882 km)

Currently in Beaumont, a construction project is widening the highway from four lanes to six lanes for a future Interstate Corridor for US 96 to connect to future I-14. Between Ennis and Waxahachie, the highway is getting grade separated interchanges and service roads.

On March 15, 2022, a bill was signed by President Joe Biden that added the extension of I-27 north to Raton, New Mexico, and south to Laredo to the Interstate Highway System utilizing the US 87, US 277 and US 83 corridors. A bill introduced in 2023 would explicitly designate the extension as I-27 with two auxiliary routes numbered I-227 and I-327. I-227 is proposed to be routed via SH 158 from Sterling City to Midland and SH 349 from Midland to Lamesa; I-327 would utilize US 287 from Dumas to the Oklahoma state line. On August 1, 2023, the legislation passed through the U.S. Senate with some slight modifications; I-227 was redesignated as I-27W with I-27 between Sterling City and Lamesa redesignated as I-27E and I-327 was redesignated as I-27N.

As of 2025 the Texas Department of Transportation was performing a feasibility study to convert US 287 into an interstate highway from Port Arthur to Amarillo.

== Major intersections ==
County	Location	mi	km	Destinations	Notes
Jefferson	Port Arthur	0.0	0.0	US 69 ends / US 96 ends / SH 87 (Gulfway Drive) / Woodworth Boulevard south	Southern terminus of US 287, US 69, and US 96; southern end of US 69/US 96 concurrency
See US 96
Hardin		30.2– 30.8	48.6– 49.6	US 96 north to FM 3513 / Mitchell Road – Lumberton, Jasper	Northern end of US 96 concurrency; interchange
Hardin	Lumberton	32.6	52.5	FM 421 to US 96	
Hardin		40.7	65.5	SH 327 east – Airport	
Hardin	Kountze	43.5	70.0	SH 326 south – Sour Lake	
Hardin	Kountze	44.2	71.1	FM 418 east – Silsbee	
Hardin		49.0	78.9	FM 1003 south – Honey Island	
Hardin		51.2	82.4	FM 420 east – Big Thicket National Preserve Visitor Center	
Hardin	Village Mills	54.7	88.0	FM 3063 west – Wildwood	
Tyler		58.0	93.3	FM 2827 west	
Tyler	Warren	62.1	99.9	FM 1943 east – Fred	Southern end of FM 1943 concurrency
Tyler	Warren	62.5	100.6	FM 1943 west	Northern end of FM 1943 concurrency
Tyler	Hillister	66.4	106.9	FM 1013 east – Spurger	
Tyler	Woodville	74.8	120.4	US 190 – Livingston, Jasper, Heritage Village, Indian Village	Access to Tyler County Hospital
Tyler	Woodville	75.2	121.0	US 69 north – Colmesneil, Lufkin	Northern end of US 69 concurrency
Tyler		83.5	134.4	FM 256 to US 190 – Colmesneil	
Tyler	Chester	90.1	145.0	FM 1745 east – Colmesneil	Southern end of FM 1745 concurrency
Tyler	Chester	90.4	145.5	FM 1745 west / FM 2097 east – Camden	Northern end of FM 1745 concurrency
Polk		96.0	154.5	FM 62 west – Camden	
Polk		100.1	161.1	FM 352 west – Pluck	
Polk	Corrigan	104.7	168.5	US 59 – Houston, Lufkin	
Polk	Corrigan			I-69 / US 59 – Houston, Lufkin	Interchange from I-69/US 59 under construction
Polk		112.1	180.4	FM 1872	
Trinity		122.1	196.5	FM 2262 east	
Trinity	Groveton	123.5	198.8	FM 355 (Devine Avenue) to SH 94 east	
Trinity	Groveton	123.6	198.9	SH 94 east (Magee Avenue) – Lufkin	Southern end of SH 94 concurrency
Trinity	Groveton	123.8	199.2	FM 2912 west (M.L. King)	
Trinity		124.9	201.0	FM 3154 north	
Trinity		126.1	202.9	SH 94 west – Trinity	Northern end of SH 94 concurrency
Trinity		129.9	209.1	FM 1280 west – Friday, Lovelady	
Trinity		134.7	216.8	FM 2781 – Holly, Pennington	
Houston		135.9	218.7	FM 358 east – Pennington	
Houston	Shady Grove	141.2	227.2	FM 232 north – Arbor	
Houston	Crockett	149.7	240.9	Loop 304 (truck route)	Access to Mid Coast Medical Center - Crockett (northbound)
Houston	Crockett	151.1– 151.2	243.2– 243.3	SH 7 / SH 19 south / SH 21	Southern end of SH 19 concurrency; traffic circle around Houston County Courthouse
Houston	Crockett	151.4	243.7	FM 229 west	
Houston	Crockett	152.6	245.6	Loop 304 (truck route)	Access to Mid Coast Medical Center - Crockett (southbound)
Houston		154.3	248.3	FM 2160 west	
Houston	Latexo	156.8	252.3	FM 2663 east	
Houston	Grapeland	162.9	262.2	Bus. US 287 north – Grapeland	
Houston	Grapeland	163.5	263.1	FM 2423	
Houston	Grapeland	164.4	264.6	FM 227 – Grapeland, Augusta	
Houston	Grapeland	164.8	265.2	FM 228 – Grapeland, Percilla	
Houston		165.8	266.8	Bus. US 287 south – Grapeland	
Anderson		174.2	280.3	SH 294 east – Slocum, Alto	Southern end of SH 294 concurrency
Anderson	Elkhart	175.7	282.8	FM 1817 north – Alderbranch	
Anderson	Elkhart	176.0	283.2	SH 294 west (Parker Street) – Downtown Elkhart	Northern end of SH 294 concurrency
Anderson		181.6	292.3	FM 2419 south – Broom City	
Anderson	Palestine	183.9	296.0	Loop 256 (truck route)	
Anderson	Palestine	185.7	298.9	US 84 east (East Park Avenue) – Texas State Railroad Palestine Depot, Palestine State Park	Southern end of US 84 concurrency
Anderson	Palestine	186.1	299.5	SH 19 north (North Church Street)	Northern end of SH 19 concurrency
Anderson	Palestine	186.4	300.0	Loop 127 east (Avenue A) / FM 322 south (South Sycamore Street)	
Anderson	Palestine	186.9	300.8	US 84 west (West Oak Street) – Fairfield	Northern end of US 84 concurrency
Anderson	Palestine	187.3	301.4	US 79 / SH 19 south (West Palestine Avenue) – Austin, Tyler, Jacksonville	Southern end of SH 19 concurrency
Anderson	Palestine	188.0	302.6	Loop 256 (truck route)	Interchange
Anderson		190.0	305.8	SH 19 north – Athens, Montalba	Northern end of SH 19 concurrency
Anderson		192.1	309.2	FM 3224 west – NASA Columbia Scientific Balloon Facility	
Anderson		198.2	319.0	Spur 324 north – Tennessee Colony	
Anderson		199.5	321.1	FM 321 – Tennessee Colony, Montalba	
Anderson		201.3	324.0	FM 645 south – Tennessee Colony	
Anderson		202.5	325.9	FM 860 east	
Anderson	Bethel	207.4	333.8	FM 2706 south – Yard	
Anderson	Cayuga	211.8	340.9	FM 59 north – Cross Roads	
Freestone		218.7	352.0	FM 488 south – Fairfield	
Navarro		222.9	358.7	SH 309 – Kerens	
Navarro		228.2	367.3	Spur 294 south	
Navarro	Eureka	232.6	374.3	FM 3243 west – Navarro	
Navarro	Eureka	233.0	375.0	FM 637 west	
Navarro		238.5	383.8	FM 739 west	
Navarro	Corsicana	239.2	385.0	FM 637 east	
Navarro	Corsicana	239.8	385.9	SH 31 – Waco, Athens	Interchange
Navarro	Corsicana	242.1	389.6	I-45 south / Bus. US 287 north – Richland	Southern end of I-45 concurrency; US 287 south follows exit 229
See I-45
Ellis	Ennis	259.9	418.3	I-45 north – Dallas	Northern end of I-45 concurrency; US 287 north follows exit 247
Ellis	Ennis	261.4	420.7	Rudd Road/Sterilite Drive	
Ellis	Ennis	263.4	423.9	FM 1183 (Oak Grove Road) / Ensign Road	
Ellis	Ennis	264.7	426.0	SH 34 – Kaufman, Italy	Access to Ennis Regional Medical Center
Ellis	Ennis	265.7	427.6	Lampasas Street	No direct northbound exit (signed at SH 34); access to Ennis Regional Medical Center
Ellis	Ennis	266.3	428.6	Bus. US 287 south / Ennis Parkway – Ennis	Interchange; northern end of freeway
Ellis	Waxahachie	275.2	442.9	Bus. US 287 north / Frontage Road	Interchange
Ellis	Waxahachie	278.5	448.2	FM 878 / FM 879	Interchange; southern end of freeway
Ellis	Waxahachie	279.2	449.3	Farley Street/Broadhead Road	No direct northbound exit
Ellis	Waxahachie	279.4	449.7	FM 813 (Brown Street)	
Ellis	Waxahachie	280.3	451.1	US 77 – Waxahachie	
Ellis	Waxahachie	281.9	453.7	I-35E – Dallas, Waco	I-35E exit 403; access to Baylor Scott and White Medical Center – Waxahachie
Ellis	Waxahachie	283.1	455.6	FM 664 – Ovilla	Southbound exit and northbound entrance
Ellis	Waxahachie	284.3	457.5	Bus. US 287 south	Interchange; northern end of freeway
Ellis	Midlothian	287.5	462.7	Plainview Road/Walnut Grove Road	Interchange
Ellis	Midlothian	289.7	466.2	Bus. US 287 north (Main Street) / Midlothian Parkway	Interchange; southern end of freeway; access to Methodist Midlothian Medical Center / Baylor Scott and White Family Medical Center - Midlothian
Ellis	Midlothian	290.9	468.2	FM 663 / 14th Street	
Ellis	Midlothian	292.4	470.6	US 67 – Cleburne, Dallas	No direct southbound exit to US 67 north (signed at US 287 Bus.)
Ellis	Midlothian	293.4	472.2	Bus. US 287 south – Midlothian	Interchange; northern end of freeway
Ellis	Grand Prairie	296.8	477.7	FM 661 east / Lakeview Road	
Ellis	Mansfield	298.4	480.2	SH 360 north – Arlington, Grand Prairie	Southern end of SH 360; interchange opened May 2018
Johnson	Mansfield	299.5	482.0	Bus. US 287 north / Lone Star Road	Interchange; access to Texas Health Hospital Mansfield
Tarrant	Mansfield	300.7	483.9	Heritage Parkway	Interchange; southern end of freeway
Tarrant	Mansfield	301.7	485.5	East Broad Street	Access to Methodist Mansfield Medical Center
Tarrant	Mansfield	303.1	487.8	Walnut Creek Drive/Debbie Lane	
Tarrant	Mansfield	304.5	490.0	FM 157 / Debbie Lane – Arlington	
Tarrant	Mansfield–Arlington city line	305.8	492.1	Turner-Warnell Road/Callender Road	
Tarrant	Arlington	306.8	493.7	Russell-Curry Road/Eden Road	
Tarrant	Arlington	308.6	496.6	Kennedale-Sublett Road	
Tarrant	Arlington	310.3	499.4	Little Road – Kennedale	
Tarrant	Arlington	310.8	500.2	I-20 east – Dallas	Southern end of I-20 concurrency; US 287 south follows exit 444
Tarrant	Fort Worth	312.6	503.1	I-20 west to Bus. US 287 (Mansfield Highway) – Abilene	Northern end of I-20 concurrency; southern end of I-820 concurrency; US 287 north follows exit 442B; US 287 south follows exit 34A
Tarrant	Fort Worth	313.3	504.2	Sun Valley Drive	I-820 exit 33C
Tarrant	Fort Worth	313.9	505.2	Martin Street	I-820 exit 33B; no northbound entrance
Tarrant	Fort Worth	314.2	505.7	I-820 north	Northern end of I-820 concurrency; US 287 north follows exit 33A
Tarrant	Fort Worth	314.7	506.5	Village Creek Road	
Tarrant	Fort Worth	315.5	507.7	Wilbarger Street/Miller Avenue	
Tarrant	Fort Worth	316.7	509.7	Berry Street/Vaughn Boulevard	
Tarrant	Fort Worth	317.8	511.4	Mitchell Boulevard	
Tarrant	Fort Worth	318.2	512.1	Cobb Park Drive	Southbound exit and northbound entrance
Tarrant	Fort Worth	318.7	512.9	Rosedale Street	
Tarrant	Fort Worth	319.2	513.7	Vickery Boulevard	No direct northbound exit (signed at Rosedale Street)
Tarrant	Fort Worth	319.3	513.9	Riverside Drive	
Tarrant	Fort Worth	320.0	515.0	SH 180 (Lancaster Avenue)	No northbound exit; SH 180 is former US 80
Tarrant	Fort Worth	320.1	515.2	I-30 west / US 377 south – Abilene	Southern end of US 377 concurrency; I-30 exit 15A
Tarrant	Fort Worth	320.1	515.2	I-30 east – Dallas	Southbound exit and northbound entrance; I-30 exits 15B-C
Tarrant	Fort Worth	320.5	515.8	Chambers Street	No southbound exit
Tarrant	Fort Worth	320.9	516.4	I-35W south – Waco	Southern end of I-35W concurrency; southbound exit and northbound entrance; US 287 south follows exit 51
Tarrant	Fort Worth	320.9	516.4	Spur 280 – Downtown Fort Worth	I-35W exit 52A; access to Fort Worth Central Station
Tarrant	Fort Worth	See I-35W			
Tarrant	Fort Worth	329.5	530.3	I-35W north / US 81 begins – Denton	Northern end of I-35W concurrency; southern end of US 81 concurrency; no southbound exit; US 287 north follows exit 60
Tarrant	Fort Worth	331.1	532.9	Harmon Road (FM 3479)	
Tarrant	Fort Worth	332.7	535.4	FM 156	
Tarrant	Fort Worth	335.5	539.9	Bonds Ranch Road	
Tarrant	Fort Worth	335.7	540.3	Blue Mound Road/Willow Springs Road	
Tarrant	Fort Worth	337.8	543.6	Bus. US 287 south / FM 718 – Newark, Saginaw	Interchange; northern end of freeway
Wise	Rhome	344.3	554.1	SH 114 east – Dallas	Southern end of SH 114 concurrency; interchange; southern end of freeway
Wise	Rhome	344.1	553.8	Bus. US 81 north / Bus. US 287 north (SH 114 Bus. west) / FM 3433 – Rhome	
Wise	Rhome	345.4	555.9	SH 114 west (SH 114 Bus. east) – Bridgeport	Northern end of SH 114 concurrency
Wise	Rhome	346.3	557.3	Bus. US 81 south / Bus. US 287 south – Rhome	Interchange; northern end of freeway
Wise	New Fairview	348.5	560.9	FM 407 – Justin	Interchange
Wise	Decatur	357.3	575.0	FM 2264 east	
Wise	Decatur	358.1	576.3	Bus. US 81 north / Bus. US 287 north – Decatur Business District	
Wise	Decatur	359.1	577.9	FM 730 – Boyd	Interchange
Wise	Decatur	360.3	579.8	Bus. US 380 / FM 51 – Weatherford, Gainesville	Interchange; access to Wise Regional Health System
Wise	Decatur	361.4	581.6	US 380 – Bridgeport, Denton	Interchange
Wise	Decatur	361.8	582.3	FM 1810 west – Chico	
Wise		362.7	583.7	Bus. US 81 south / Bus. US 287 south – Decatur Business District	
Wise		370.0	595.5	Bus. US 81 north / Bus. US 287 north – Alvord	Interchange; southern end of freeway
Wise		370.4	596.1	Hubbard Street	
Wise	Alvord	371.4	597.7	FM 1655	
Wise		372.5	599.5	Bus. US 81 south / Bus. US 287 south – Alvord	Interchange; no direct northbound exit; northern end of freeway
Montague		378.1	608.5	Spur 511 / Cemetery Road – Sunset	Interchange; southern end of freeway
Montague		379.3	610.4	SH 101 – Sunset, Bridgeport	
Montague		381.1	613.3	Lawhorn Lane	
Montague		382.6	615.7	Fruitland Road	
Montague		384.5	618.8	Wagonseller Road	
Montague		386.2	621.5	US 81 north / SH 101 – Bowie, Waurika	Northern end of US 81 concurrency; no northbound entrance; no access from US 287 south to SH 101
Montague	Bowie	386.8	622.5	FM 1125 – Amon G. Carter Lake	
Montague	Bowie	388.1	624.6	SH 59 – Montague, Jacksboro	
Montague		390.5	628.4	FM 174 to US 81 north – Bowie	Interchange; northern end of freeway
Clay	Bellevue	398.9	642.0	FM 1288 south	Southern end of FM 1288 concurrency
Clay	Bellevue	399.3	642.6	FM 1288 north	Northern end of FM 1288 concurrency
Clay		411.2	661.8	New York Road	Interchange southbound; at-grade intersection northbound
Clay	Henrietta	413.6	665.6	Spur 510 – Henrietta	Interchange; southern end of freeway
Clay	Henrietta	414.6	667.2	SH 148 – Jacksboro	
Clay		415.6	668.8	Access Road	
Clay		416.7	670.6	US 82 east – Henrietta, Gainesville, Texarkana	Southern end of US 82 concurrency; northern end of freeway; interchange; access to Clay County Memorial Hospital
Clay	Jolly	424.7	683.5	FM 2393 – Jolly	Interchange
Clay		426.0	685.6	Loop 47 east	
Clay		428.3	689.3	Bus. US 287 north to SH 240	Interchange; southern end of freeway
Clay		428.9	690.2	Stephens Ranch Road	No direct northbound exit
Wichita	Wichita Falls	429.8	691.7	Fisher Road	
Wichita	Wichita Falls	430.5	692.8	Hammon Road	
Wichita	Wichita Falls	431.1	693.8	SH 79 north – Waurika	Southern end of SH 79 concurrency; no direct northbound exit (signed at Hammon Road)
Wichita	Wichita Falls	431.9	695.1	Windthorst Road	
Wichita	Wichita Falls	432.3	695.7	US 281 south / SH 79 south – Jacksboro, Archer City	Northern end of SH 79 concurrency; southern end of US 281 concurrency
Wichita	Wichita Falls	432.8	696.5	Spur 447 / Loop 473 (Old Jacksboro Highway) / Galveston Street	
Wichita	Wichita Falls	433.4	697.5	US 82 west / US 277 south – Lubbock, Abilene	Northern end of US 82 concurrency; southern end of US 277 concurrency
Wichita	Wichita Falls	433.9	698.3	Broad Street – Business District	Northbound exit and southbound entrance
Wichita	Wichita Falls	434.7	699.6	Holliday Street – Business District	Southern end of I-44 concurrency; southbound exit and northbound entrance; I-44 exit 1; access to United Regional Healthcare System
Wichita	Wichita Falls	434.7	699.6	6th Street – MPEC	No direct southbound exit
Wichita	Wichita Falls	434.9	699.9	Bus. US 277 south	No northbound exit; I-44 exit 1A
Wichita	Wichita Falls	435.3	700.5	Scotland Park	I-44 exit 1B; no direct southbound exit
Wichita	Wichita Falls	435.9	701.5	Texas Travel Info Center	I-44 exit 1C
Wichita	Wichita Falls	436.5	702.5	Bus. US 287	I-44 exit 1D
Wichita	Wichita Falls	436.8	703.0	Maurine Street	I-44 exit 2
Wichita	Wichita Falls	437.3	703.8	I-44 east / US 277 north / US 281 north / Spur 325 north – Burkburnett, Lawton, Sheppard AFB	Northern end of I-44/US 277/US 281 concurrency; US 287 north follows exit 3A
Wichita	Wichita Falls	438.1	705.1	Loop 11 (Beverly Drive)	
Wichita	Wichita Falls	439.2	706.8	City View Drive	
Wichita	Wichita Falls	440.5	708.9	Wellington Lane	
Wichita	Wichita Falls	441.3	710.2	Huntington Lane	
Wichita	Wichita Falls	442.2	711.7	FM 369	
Wichita		443.2	713.3	Rifle Range Road	
Wichita		444.2	714.9	Peterson Road	
Wichita	Iowa Park	445.2	716.5	Bell Road	
Wichita	Iowa Park	446.1	717.9	FM 368 – Iowa Park	
Wichita	Iowa Park	447.1	719.5	Bus. US 287 south (Johnson Road) – Iowa Park	
Wichita		449.2	722.9	Harmony Road	
Wichita		451.7	726.9	Burnett Ranch Road	
Wichita		455.2	732.6	Bus. US 287 north – Electra	No southbound exit
Wichita		456.3	734.3	FM 2384	
Wichita		458.8	738.4	Midway Church Road	
Wichita	Electra	460.7	741.4	FM 1739	
Wichita	Electra	461.8	743.2	SH 25 – Electra, Archer City	Access to Electra Memorial Hospital
Wichita–Wilbarger county line	Electra	463.8	746.4	County Line Road	
Wilbarger		465.0	748.3	Bus. US 287 south – Electra	Interchange; northern end of freeway; no direct northbound exit
Wilbarger		468.2	753.5	SH 240 – Burkburnett	Interchange
Wilbarger	Harrold	468.7	754.3	FM 1763 – Harrold	Interchange
Wilbarger	Oklaunion	380.5	612.4	Loop 404 west – Oklaunion	Southern end of freeway; southbound exit and entrance
Wilbarger	Oklaunion	380.9	613.0	US 70 east / US 183 north – Oklaunion, Frederick, Ardmore	Southern end of US 70/US 183 concurrency; interchange; southern end of freeway
Wilbarger	Oklaunion	381.6	614.1	Loop 145 – Oklaunion	No direct northbound exit (signed at US 70 east/US 183 north)
Wilbarger	Oklaunion	382.2	615.1	Loop 404	Southbound exit only
Wilbarger		382.4	615.4	FM 433	Interchange; northern end of freeway
Wilbarger		385.4	620.2	Frontage Road	At-grade intersection
Wilbarger		386.1	621.4	FM 1763	Interchange; southern end of freeway
Wilbarger		387.1	623.0	Bus. US 287 north – Vernon	No direct southbound exit
Wilbarger		387.9	624.3	FM 1949	No direct southbound exit (signed at Laurie Street)
Wilbarger	Vernon	389.0	626.0	Laurie Street	
Wilbarger	Vernon	389.8	627.3	US 183 south / US 283 – Seymour, Altus	Northern end of US 183 concurrency
Wilbarger	Vernon	390.6	628.6	Bentley Street	
Wilbarger	Vernon	391.5	630.1	US 70 west / Bus. US 287 south – Crowell, Plainview, Vernon, Paducah	Northern end of US 70 concurrency; interchange; northern end of freeway; access to North Texas State Hospital / Wilbarger General Hospital
Wilbarger		393.4	633.1	FM 925 east	Southern end of FM 925 concurrency; interchange
Wilbarger		394.5	634.9	FM 925 west – Farmers Valley	Northern end of FM 925 concurrency
Wilbarger		396.7	638.4	FM 432	Interchange
Hardeman		403.4	649.2	FM 925 east – Farmers Valley	
Hardeman	Chillicothe	405.6	652.7	FM 91	
Hardeman		411.1	661.6	FM 2006 north	
Hardeman		413.2	665.0	FM 1167 south – Medicine Mound	
Hardeman		417.7	672.2	FM 2568	
Hardeman	Quanah	418.9	674.2	SH 6 (Main Street) – Crowell, Altus, Copper Breaks State Park, Historical Main Street, Historical Museum	Access to Hardeman County Memorial Hospital
Hardeman	Quanah	419.7	675.4	FM 2568 – Airport	
Hardeman	Quanah	420.0	675.9	Loop 285 west	
Hardeman		424.5	683.2	Loop 285 east – Acme	Interchange
Hardeman		425.4	684.6	FM 1166 north	
Hardeman	Goodlett	427.5	688.0	FM 2363 – Goodlett	
Hardeman		428.1	689.0	FM 2363 south – Goodlett	
Hardeman		428.5	689.6	FM 680 north	
Hardeman		432.9	696.7	FM 268	
Childress		436.1	701.8	FM 2875	
Childress		438.1	705.1	FM 1033 north (County Road 22)	Southern end of FM 1033 concurrency
Childress	Kirkland	438.4	705.5	FM 1033 south	Northern end of FM 1033 concurrency
Childress		440.2	708.4	FM 2638 south	
Childress	Childress	446.3	718.3	FM 2530	
Childress	Childress	446.9	719.2	FM 3031 south (5th Street)	
Childress	Childress	447.0	719.4	FM 268 east (3rd Street Northeast)	
Childress	Childress	447.5	720.2	FM 401 north (7th Street)	
Childress	Childress	448.5	721.8	US 62 / US 83 – Paducah, Wellington, Hollis	
Childress		451.4	726.5	FM 164 – T.L. Roach Unit, Airport	Interchange
Childress		453.3	729.5	Loop 328 – Carey, Lake Childress, Baylor Lake	
Childress		455.7	733.4	Loop 328 – Carey, Lake Childress, Baylor Lake	
Hall		462.4	744.2	FM 658 south	
Hall	Estelline	463.2	745.4	SH 86 west – Turkey, Caprock Canyons State Park	
Hall		466.6	750.9	FM 1619 north – Newlin	
Hall		473.1	761.4	FM 1619 south	
Hall	Memphis	477.7	768.8	SH 256 – Silverton, Wellington, Hollis, Downtown Memphis	
Hall	Memphis	478.0	769.3	FM 1547 east (Montgomery) / North 6th – Quail, , Downtown Memphis	Access to Memphis Municipal Airport
Hall	Memphis	479.0	770.9	FM Spur 2361 south (Delaney)	
Donley	Hedley	490.3	789.1	SH 203 east / SH 273 north – McLean, Wellington	
Donley	Lelia Lake	497.0	799.8	FM 1754 south	
Donley	Lelia Lake	497.5	800.6	FM 1755 north	
Donley		500.7	805.8	FM 1260	
Donley	Clarendon	503.8	810.8	SH 70 south – Turkey, Silverton	Southern end of SH 70 concurrency
Donley	Clarendon	504.7	812.2	FM 2162 south	
Donley	Clarendon	505.0	812.7	SH 70 north – Greenbelt Lake, Howardwick, Pampa	Northern end of SH 70 concurrency
Donley		507.0	815.9	FM 3257 north – Greenbelt Lake	
Donley	Ashtola	514.3	827.7	FM 2362 south	
Armstrong	Goodnight	522.9	841.5	FM 294 north – White Deer	
Armstrong		526.4	847.2	FM 2889 south	
Armstrong		533.2	858.1	FM 1151 east	Southern end of FM 1151 concurrency
Armstrong	Claude	533.9	859.2	FM 1151 west	Northern end of FM 1151 concurrency
Armstrong	Claude	534.5	860.2	SH 207 – Silverton, Panhandle, Lake Mackenzie, Palo Duro Park	
Armstrong		538.9	867.3	FM 3330 south	
Armstrong		545.4	877.7	FM 2373 north	
Armstrong	Washburn	547.2	880.6	FM 2250 south	
Carson	No major junctions				
Potter		551.8	888.0	FM 1912 north	
Potter		552.8	889.6	Spur 228 north – Amarillo College East Campus	
Potter	Amarillo	554.1	891.7	SE 3rd Avenue	Northbound exit and entrance only; interchange
Potter	Amarillo	554.5	892.4	I-40 east – Oklahoma City	Southern end of I-40 concurrency; southern end of freeway section; southbound exit and northbound entrance; I-40 exit 78
Potter	Amarillo	See I-40			
Potter	Amarillo	562.0	904.5	I-27 / US 87 south / US 60 west (Marshall Formby Memorial Highway) / I-40 west – Albuquerque, Canyon, Lubbock	Northern end of I-40 concurrency; southern end of US 60 west/US 87 south concurrency; I-40 exit 70
Potter	Amarillo	562.6	905.4	US 60 / US 87 (Pierce Street)	Northern end of US 60 west/US 87 south concurrency; oOne-way street, inbound access only; southbound entrance only
Potter	Amarillo			US 60	Southern end of US 60 east concurrency; northbound entrance only; northern end of freeway
Potter	Amarillo	563.1	906.2	SE 6th Avenue (Loop 279)	Does not intersect US 287 north (Buchanan Avenue); former Bus. US 66
Potter	Amarillo	564.2	908.0	US 60 east / I-40 BL (Amarillo Boulevard)	Northern end of US 60 east concurrency; access to Northwest Texas Hospital
Potter	Amarillo			Buchanan Street north	Northbound exit only; southern end of freeway
Potter	Amarillo	564.7	908.8	US 87 south (Pierce Street) to I-27	Southern end of US 87 concurrency; southbound exit only
Potter	Amarillo	564.7	908.8	US 87 (Fillmore Street)	Southern end of US 87 concurrency; entrances only
See US 87
Moore	Dumas	611.1	983.5	US 87 north / SH 152 east – Dalhart, Hartley, Stinnett, Amarillo College, Airport	Northern end of US 87 concurrency; access to Moore County Hospital and Moore County Airport; future southern terminus of I-27N
Moore		614.6	989.1	FM 119 north – Sunray	
Moore	Etter	621.8	1,000.7	FM 281 – Dalhart, Sunray	Interchange
Sherman		625.3	1,006.3	FM 297 west – Dalhart	
Sherman		630.3	1,014.4	FM 1573 east – Sunray	
Sherman	Stratford	643.8	1,036.1	SH 15 east – Gruver, Spearman	
Sherman	Stratford	644.1	1,036.6	US 54 – Dalhart, Texhoma	
Dallam	Kerrick	658.9	1,060.4	FM 807 south – Conlen	
Dallam		659.1	1,060.7	US 287 north – Boise City, Springfield	Continuation into Oklahoma; future northern terminus of I-27N
1.000 mi = 1.609 km; 1.000 km = 0.621 mi: Concurrency terminus; Incomplete access; Unopened

== Image gallery ==
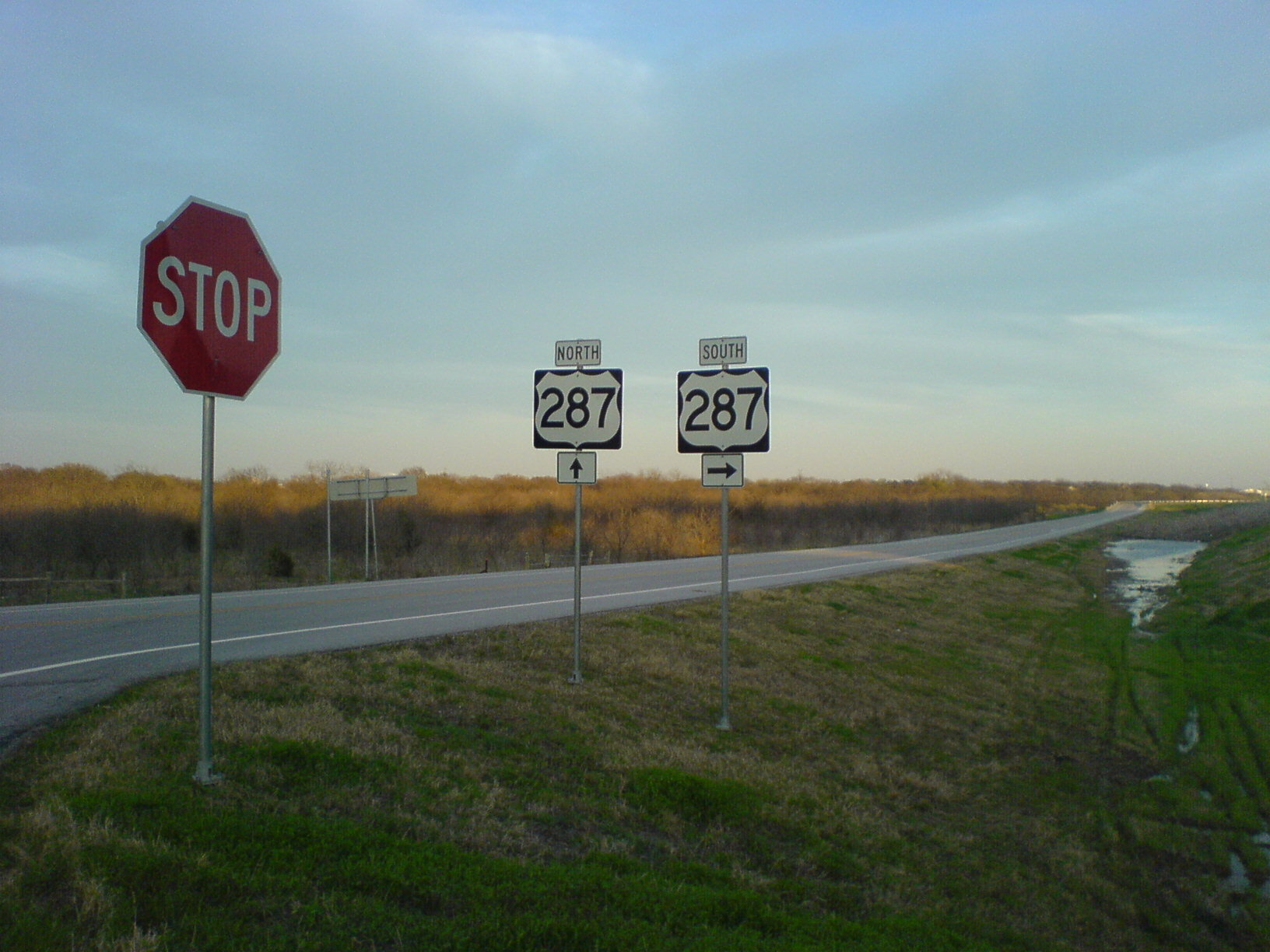
Approaching US 287 in Mansfield.

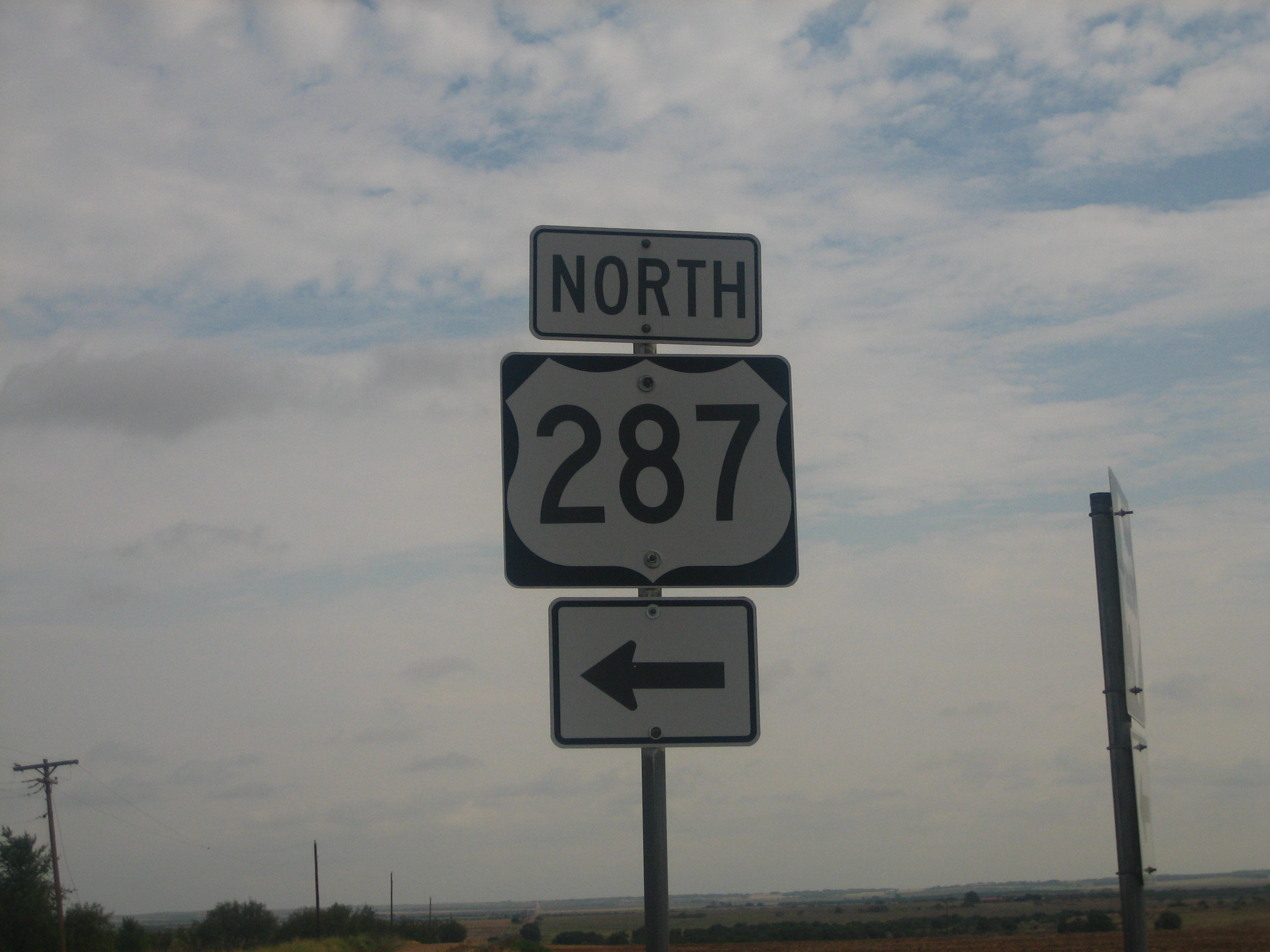
US 287 runs northwest-southeast through Childress, located equidistant from Amarillo and Wichita Falls.

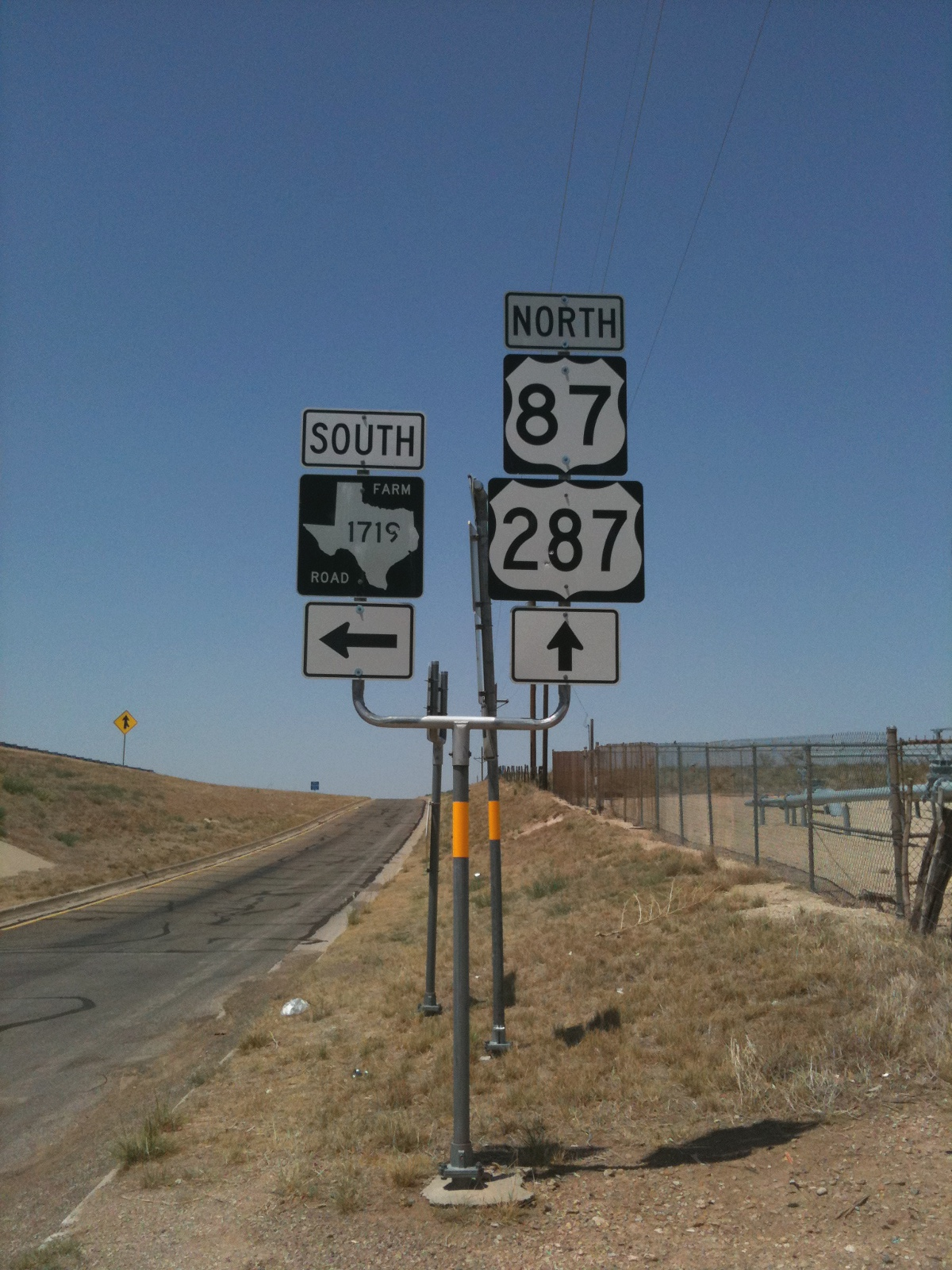
US 287 is concurrent with US 87 between Amarillo and Dumas.

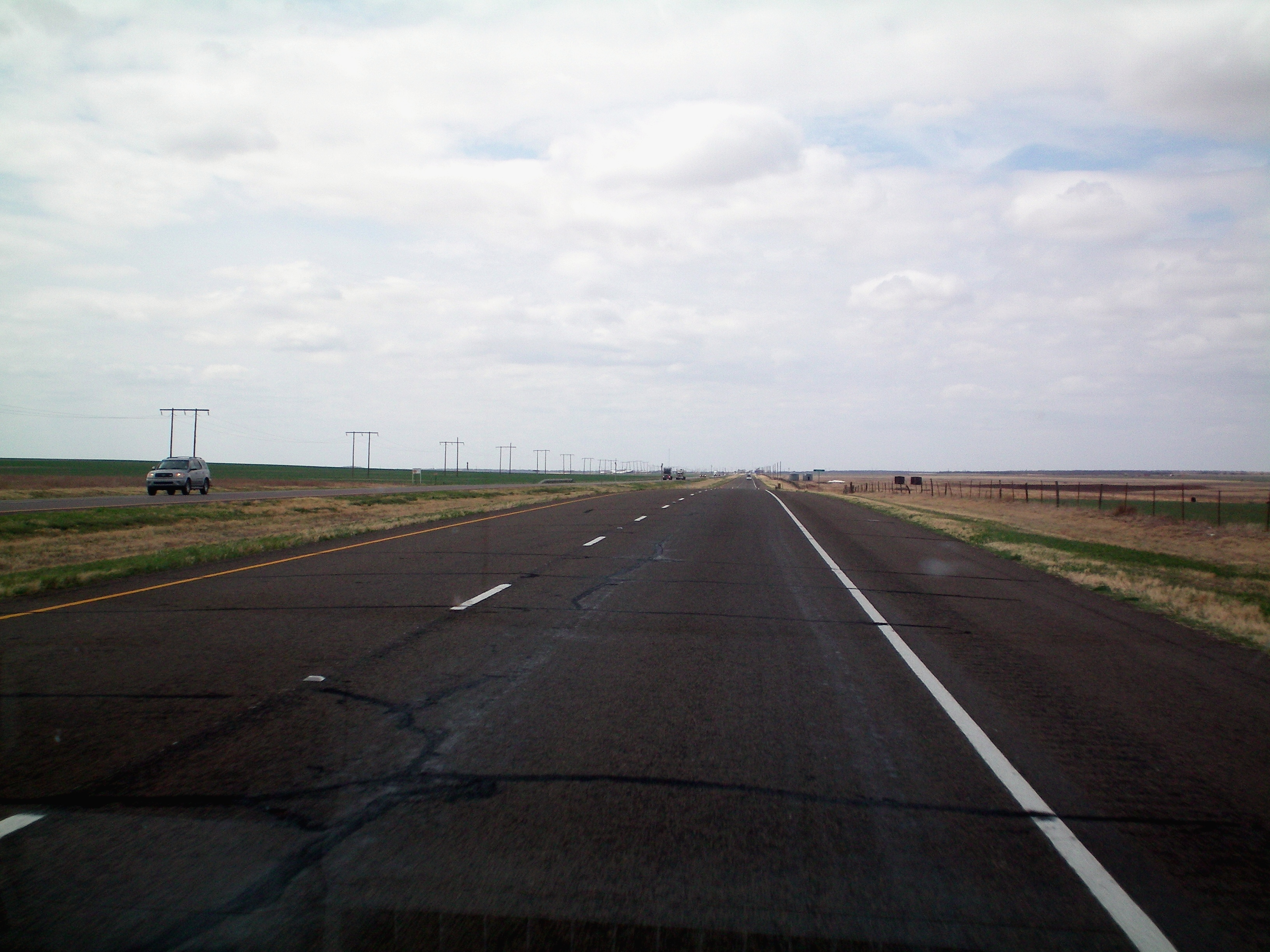
US 287 in North Texas.

== See also ==
U.S. Route 287
Previous state: Terminus	Texas	Next state: Oklahoma
