= Kerrick =

Kerrick may refer to:

== People ==
- Kerrick Majors (1972–1987), African-American murder victim
- Ginger Kerrick (born 1970), American physicist
- Harrison S. Kerrick (c. 1873–1939), American colonel and railroad executive
- Kerrick, a character in the 1984 novel West of Eden by Harry Harrison

== Places ==
- Kerrick, Illinois, an unincorporated community
- Kerrick, Minnesota, a city
- Kerrick, Texas, an unincorporated community, named after Harrison
- Kerrick Township, Pine County, Minnesota

== Other uses ==
- Kerrick Sports Sedan Series, part of the Australian National Sports Sedan Series
