= Kerrick, Texas =

Unincorporated community in Texas, US

- Unincorporated community
- Location in Texas
- Coordinates: 36°29′44″N 102°14′34″W
- Country: United States
- State: Texas
- County: Dallam
- First settled: 1906
- Platted: 1931
- Named for: Harrison S. Kerrick

Kerrick is an unincorporated community in Dallam County, Texas, United States. According to the Handbook of Texas, the community had a population of 60 in 2000.

== History ==
Kerrick is located on the Panhandle and Santa Fe Railway. It was first settled in 1906 by William Murdock and his family, but was first platted in 1931. The town is named for Harrison S. Kerrick, a railroad official and United States Army colonel, who owned some land in the community. Its first business was a grain elevator built by Dan T. Wadley. The post office was established in 1933 and remained in operation until 2002. It was designated a contract post office in 1976. In 1949, there were five businesses and 100 residents. The population lowered to 60 by the 2000s. The main sources of entertainment and relaxation were community bands and sporting activities. In 2002, the community church took over a structure that had previously been a café, and the grain elevator continued to function. Numerous programs took place at the community center.

On June 13, 2023, storm chasers and trained storm spotters observed an EFU tornado over an open field southwest of Kerrick. No damage was reported.

== Geography ==
Kerrick is located at the intersection of U.S. Route 287 and Farm to Market Road 807 south of the Oklahoma Panhandle, 36 mi (58 km) northeast of Dalhart, 17 mi (27 km) north of Stratford, 18 mi (29 km) north of Conlen, and 100 mi (160 km) north of Amarillo in northeastern Dallam County.

== Education ==
William Murdock and his family opened the first school here. The former Kerrick school building was converted into a community center in 1950 following the consolidation of its schools with the Stratford Independent School District.
