= List of U.S. Highways in Texas =

- Texas US Highway markers

Highway names
- Interstates: Interstate X (I-X); Interstate Highway X (IH X)
- US Highways: U.S. Highway X (US X)
- State: State Highway X (SH X)
- Loops: Loop X
- Spurs: Spur X
- Recreational: Recreational Road X (RE X)
- Farm or Ranch to Market Roads: Farm to Market Road X (FM X); Ranch to Market Road X (RM X)
- Park Roads: Park Road X (PR X)

System links
- Highways in Texas; Interstate; US; State; Former; Toll; Loops; Spurs; FM/RM; Park; Rec

U.S. Highways in Texas are owned and maintained by the state. These U.S. Highways are the second-highest category of road classifications in the Texas road system, just below the Interstate Highways. U.S. Highways are marked with a number contained inside a white shield in a black box. The number is generally even if the highway runs east–west, and generally odd if it runs north–south, though there are many substantial deviations from this plan.

== Mainline highways ==
Number	Length (mi)	Length (km)	Southern or western terminus	Northern or eastern terminus	Formed	Removed	Notes
US 54	111.6	179.6	Loop 375 in El Paso New Mexico state line in Nara Visa, New Mexico	New Mexico state line in Chaparral, New Mexico Oklahoma state line in Texhoma	1926	current	US 54 begins at an intersection with Loop 375 in El Paso and travels northeast to the New Mexico state line. US 54 again enters Texas near Nara Visa, New Mexico, and travels due northeast through the Texas Panhandle to the Oklahoma state line at Texhoma.
US 57	98.1	157.9	Mexican border at Eagle Pass	I-35 near Moore	1970	current	Travels northeast through south Texas farmlands; former SH 57
US 59	622.736	1,002.196	Mexican border at Laredo	Arkansas state line at Texarkana	1935	current	US 59 begins at the Mexican border in Laredo and at just under two miles northeast of the border it intersects Interstate 35 in Laredo. The route travels northeast, intersecting with I-37 near George West, Texas. It continues northeast through the Texas coastal plains before reaching the Greater Houston area, where it intersects Interstates 610, 45 and 10. It continues north through far east Texas reaching Texarkana and Interstate 30. US 59 travels north along the Arkansas state line before finally fully entering Arkansas at the Red River near Ogden, Arkansas.
US 60	210.7	339.1	New Mexico state line at Farwell	Oklahoma state line near Higgins	1932	current	US 60 enters Texas from New Mexico at Farwell and travels northeast through the Texas Panhandle, meeting both I-27 and I-40 at Amarillo. The route continues northeast, entering Oklahoma near Higgins.
US 62	404.8	651.5	US 85 at the U.S.-Mexico border in El Paso US 180 at New Mexico state line northwest of Pine Springs	US 180 at New Mexico state line west of Seminole Oklahoma state line near Hollis, OK	1932	current	US 62 begins at the Mexican border in El Paso and travels east through far west Texas to the New Mexico state line east of Guadalupe Mountains National Park. It reenters Texas west of Seminole and travels northeast through the southern Texas Panhandle to the Oklahoma state line northeast of Childress.
US 66	—	—	New Mexico state line at Glenrio	Oklahoma state line at Texola	1927	1985	Historic route through Texas Panhandle; proposed in 1925 as US 60 along SH 75 and SH 13; largely replaced by I-40
US 67	766	1,233	Mexican border at Presidio	Arkansas state line at Texarkana	1927	current	US 67 begins at the Mexican border in Presidio and travels northeastward through the central portions of Texas. In Dallas, it meets I-30 and travels eastward concurrent or parallel to it until it reaches the Arkansas state line at Texarkana.
US 69	338.6	544.9	SH 87 in Port Arthur	Oklahoma state line near Denison	1935	current	
US 70	—	—	New Mexico state line at Fort Bliss	Mexican border	1932	1934	Former US 366; replaced by US 54 (now US 54 Bus.)
US 70	192.3	309.5	New Mexico state line near Farwell	Oklahoma state line near Oklaunion	1927	current	
US 71	2.9	4.7	US 71 at the Arkansas state line	US 71 at the Arkansas state line	1927	current	State Line Avenue in Texarkana; southbound side is in Texarkana, Texas, northbound side is in Texarkana, Arkansas, fully enters the state briefly in the vicinity of the temporary end of I-49.
US 75	76.2	122.6	I-345 in Dallas	US 75/US 69 near Denison	1927	current	Prior to 1987, US 75's southern terminus was in Galveston
US 77	471.3	758.5	Mexican border in Brownsville	I-35/US 77 near Gainesville	1927	current	Unsigned overlap with I-35 and I-35E in Denton
US 79	271.8	437.4	I-35 at Round Rock (exit #253)	Louisiana state line near Panola	1935	current	
US 80	155.3	249.9	I-30 in Dallas	Louisiana state line	1927	current	
US 80N	—	—	Metcalf Gap	Abilene	1932	1934	Former SH 1A, replaced by US 80 Alt. (now US 180 and SH 351)
US 81	81.5	131.2	I-35W/US 287 at Fort Worth	Oklahoma state line	1927	current	Prior to 1991, US 81's southern terminus was at Laredo
US 82	504.7	812.2	FM 769 near Plains	Arkansas state line at Texarkana	1935	current	
US 83	906.5	1,458.9	Mexican border in Brownsville	Oklahoma state line near Perryton	1932	current	
US 84	530.4	853.6	US 60/US 70/US 84 at Farwell	Louisiana state line in Joaquin	1935	current	
US 85	5.6	9.0	Mexican border in El Paso	I-10/US 85/US 180 in Anthony	1946	current	
US 87	801.1	1,289.2	SH 238 in Port Lavaca	New Mexico-Texas state line near Texline	1935	current	
US 90	607.633	977.891	I-10/SH 54 at Van Horn	I-10/US 90 in Orange	1927	current	Shortened to Van Horn in 1940 (section became SH 54); rerouted north via Sealy to Columbus in 1941 (original southern route to Columbus became SH 343; now US 90A); one section returned to Del Rio in 2003; another section removed in Beaumont in 2016 and rerouted along IH 10
US 96	—	—	Brownsville	Rosenberg	1926	1939	Proposed in 1925; assigned along SH 12 in 1926; extended to Houston along US 90 in 1932 (shortened back to Rosenberg in 1934); proposed to be a portion of US 71 in 1933; shortened to Alice in 1934; rerouted to Laredo in 1935; replaced by US 59
US 96	133.7	215.2	SH 87 in Port Arthur	US 59/US 84 at Tenaha	1939	current	Former US 59
US 164	—	—	Amarillo	Oklahoma state line at Higgins	1928	1930	Former SH 33, replaced by US 60
US 175	111.0	178.6	I-45 in Dallas	US 69 in Jacksonville	1932	current	
US 180	298.0	479.6	I-10/US 85 at the New Mexico state line near Anthony US 62 at New Mexico state line west of Seminole	US 62 at New Mexico state line northwest of Pine Springs I-20 in Hudson Oaks	1943	current	New Mexico state line northwest of El Paso to New Mexico state line northeast of Guadalupe Mountains National Park; from New Mexico state line west of Seminole to just east of Weatherford
US 181	135.5	218.1	I-37/SH 35 at Corpus Christi	I-37 near San Antonio	1927	current	
US 183	426.0	685.6	US 77/US 77 Alt. in Refugio	US 70/US 183 at Oklahoma state line near Vernon	1939	current	
US 190	513.4	826.2	I-10 (exit #307) near Iraan	Louisiana state line east of Bon Wier	1935	current	
US 259	146.1	235.1	US 59/Bus. US 59 near Nacogdoches	US 59/US 270 at Oklahoma state line near Heavener, OK	1962	current	Former SH 26
US 271	132.0	212.4	SH 31/SH 155 in Tyler	Oklahoma state line north of Paris	1932	current	
US 277	396.5	638.1	US 83 at Carrizo Springs	I-44/US 277/US 281 near Burkburnett	1932	current	
US 281	581.608	936.007	US 77 Bus./SH 48 in Brownsville	I-44/US 277/US 281 near Burkburnett	1935	current	
US 283	150.4	242.0	US 87 near Brady	Oklahoma state line north of Vernon	1932	current	Rerouted in 1951 over US 183; old route became US 380 (now SH 6), US 183 and US 377
US 285	169.8	273.3	US 90 in Sanderson	New Mexico state line north of Pecos	1935	current	
US 287	503.8	810.8	US 69/US 96/SH 87 in Port Arthur	Oklahoma state line northwest of Stratford	1934	current	
US 290	261.2	420.4	I-10 near Junction	I-610 in Houston	1927	current	Originally US 80 in West Texas to San Antonio; rerouted north and extended to Houston in 1935; rerouted north away from Bastrop and Paige (original route now SH 71 and SH 21); shortened to near Segovia in 1991 due to completion of I-10 (old route now I-10 Business, SH 290, RM 1312, RM 3130, and RM 1674)
US 366	—	—	Mexican border at El Paso New Mexico state line at Fort Bliss	New Mexico state line west of Farwell US 66/SH 13 in Amarillo	1926	1932	Proposed as US 360 in 1925; section in West Texas replaced by US 70 (later US 54, now US 54 Bus.) and section in the Panhandle replaced by US 60
US 370	—	—	Bowie	Claude	1926	1939	Proposed in 1925 as a portion of US 85; replaced by US 287
US 377	335.0	539.1	US 90 at Del Rio	Oklahoma state line north of Whitesboro	1932	current	
US 380	383.0	616.4	New Mexico state line at FM 769 west of Brownville	I-30/US 67/US 69 in Greenville	1932	current	
US 385	—	—	Comfort	New Mexico state line at Texline	1926	1935	Former SH 5 and SH 9, replaced by US 87
US 385	441.0	709.7	Big Bend National Park	Oklahoma state line north of Dalhart	1927	current	
Former

== Special routes ==
Number	Length (mi)	Length (km)	Southern or western terminus	Northern or eastern terminus	Formed	Removed	Notes
Bus. US 54	12.67	20.39	US 54/Loop 478 in El Paso	New Mexico state line	1991	current	Former portion of Loop 478
US 59 Alt.	—	—	—	—	1945	1950	
US 59 Bus.	—	—	—	—	1941	1956	Was decommissioned from 1945-1950
Bus. US 59	13.90	22.37	US 59 / Future I-369 south of Marshall	US 59 / Future I-369 north of Marshall	2021	current	Former US 59
Bus. US 59	3.59	5.78	US 59/SH 149 south of Carthage	US 59/US 79 north of Carthage	1991	current	Former Loop 455
Bus. US 59	6.64	10.69	US 59/Loop 224 in Nacogdoches	US 59/US 259 north of Nacogdoches	1991	current	Former Loop 495
Bus. US 59	4.55	7.32	Loop 287/US 59 in Lufkin	Loop 287/US 59 in Lufkin	1991	current	Former routing of US 59
Bus. US 59	6.70	10.78	US 59 south of Diboll	US 59 in Burke	1991	current	
Bus. US 59	4.90	7.89	US 59 south of Corrigan	US 59 north of Corrigan	1991	current	Former Loop 455
Bus. US 59	4.59	7.39	US 59 in Livingston	US 59 in Livingston	1991	current	Former Loop 90
Bus. US 59	1.5	2.4	US 59 in Splendora	US 59 north of Splendora	1991	current	Former Loop 512
Bus. US 59	3.59	5.78	US 59 south of Wharton	US 59 north of Hungerford	1998	current	Former Loop 183
Bus. US 59	6.59	10.61	US 59 west of El Campo	US 59 east of El Campo	1997	current	Former Loop 525
Bus. US 59	13.76	22.14	US 59/US 77 southwest of Victoria	US 59 at Telferner	1995	current	Former routing of US 59
Bus. US 59	1.33	2.14	US 281 in George West	US 59 east of George West	1991	current	Former Spur 589
Bus. US 59	3.533	5.686	I-35/US 83 (exit #2) in Laredo	US 59/Loop 20 in Laredo	2014	current	Former routing of US 59
US 59 Byp.	—	—	—	—	1942	1956	Became US 59/US 71
Bus. US 66	—	—	—	—	1954	1985	Former routing of US 66, redesignated as Loop 279
US 66 City	—	—	—	—	1942	1956	Became US 66 Bus. and US 87
Bus. US 67	1.80	2.90	US 67	US 67/FM 170	1996	current	Former routing of US 67
Bus. US 67	4.35	7.00	US 67/Loop 306	US 67	1996	current	Former Loop 545
Bus. US 67	3.01	4.84	US 67	US 67	1996	current	Former UR 380
Bus. US 67	4.60	7.40	US 67/US 377 south of Dublin	US 67/US 377 north of Dublin	2001	current	Former section of US 67/US 377
Bus. US 67	7.76	12.49	US 67 west of Cleburne	US 67/Spur 102 in Keene	1996	current	Former routing of US 67
Bus. US 67	—	—	—	—	1967	1976	
Bus. US 67	1.20	1.93	Business I-35-V in Alvarado	US 67 in Alvarado	1991	current	Former Spur 379
Bus. US 67	—	—	—	—	1991	2006	Former Loop 489; section from US 67 south to US 287 returned to the city of Midlothian and section from US 287 south to US 67 redesignated as Spur 73
Bus. US 67	—	—	—	—	1991	2001	Former Loop 302, redesignated as Spur 302
Bus. US 67	3.01	4.84	I-30/US 67	Loop 301	1991	current	Former Loop 313
US 69 Alt.	—	—	—	—	1942	1948	Became US 90
Bus. US 69	0.97	1.56	US 69 in Trenton	SH 121 in Trenton	1991	current	Former Loop 220
Bus. US 69	5.27	8.48	US 69 in Greenville	US 69 in Greenville	1991	current	Former Loop 315
Bus. US 69	3.79	6.10	Loop 287 in Lufkin	Loop 287/US 69 in Lufkin	1991	current	Former US 69 and SH 103
US 75 Bus.	—	—	—	—	1942	1944	Partially replaced by Loop 149
US 75 Bus.	—	—	—	—	1991	1994	Former Loop 93, redesignated as SH 91 and Spur 503
US 75 Temp.	—	—	—	—	1951	1951	Became US 75 (now I-45) and SH 3
US 77 Alt.	91.00	146.45	US 77/US 183 in Refugio	US 77/US 90 Alt. in Hallettsville	1953	current	(Note: The official mileage in the TxDOT designation file does not include the concurrency with US 183.)
Bus. US 77	—	—	—	—	1967	1976	Partially replaced by SH 354
Bus. US 77	4.90	7.89	point south of CR 28	point north of CR 16	2025	current	
Bus. US 77	9.72	15.64	I-35 in Waco	I-35	1991	current	Former Loop 491
Bus. US 77	2.92	4.70	US 77 Alt. in Yoakum	US 77 Alt. in Yoakum	1991	current	Former Loop 51; signed as Business Alternate US 77
Bus. US 77	7.70	12.39	US 59 in Victoria	Loop 463 in Victoria	2002	current	Former routing of US 77
Bus. US 77	4.45	7.16	US 77/FM 1945	US 77 north of Sinton	1991	current	Former Loop 73
Bus. US 77	4.77	7.68	I-69E/US 77 south of Robstown	I-69E/US 77 north of Robstown	1991	current	Former Loop 295
Bus. US 77	13.58	21.85	US 77	US 77	1991	current	Former Loop 428
Bus. US 77	14.39	23.16	I-69E/US 77	I-69E/US 77	1991	current	Former Loop 448
Bus. US 77	14.92	24.01	I-69E/US 77/US 83	I-69E/US 77	1991	current	Former section of Loop 448
Bus. US 77	3.89	6.26	I-69E/US 77/US 83 in Brownsville	FM 802 in Brownsville	1991	current	Former Loop 415
Bus. US 77	—	—	—	—	1967	1976	
Bus. US 79	—	—	—	—	—	—	Replaced by Loop 343
Bus. US 79	—	—	—	—	1991	2018	Former Loop 427; section from US 79 to SH 95 returned to Taylor and section from SH 95 to US 79 redesignated as SH 95
Bus. US 79	2.58	4.15	US 79 in Henderson	US 79/US 259 near Willow Lake	1991	current	Former Loop 153 and Loop 154
Bus. US 79	2.92	4.70	US 79/SH 149 west of Carthage	US 59/US 79 in Carthage	1991	current	Former Loop 334
US 80 Alt.	—	—	US 80 in El Paso	US 80 in White Spur	1939	1964	Partially replaced by Loop 16 (now US 85)
US 80 Alt.	—	—	Abilene	Weatherford	1932	1943	Portion of route formerly US 80N; originally Metcalf Gap-Abilene, extended to Weatherford in 1938; Weatherford-Albany became US 180 and Albany-Abilene became SH 351
Bus. US 80	—	—	—	—	1953	—	Partially replaced by Loop 260
Bus. US 80	—	—	—	—	—	—	Was co-signed with US 180 Bus.
Bus. US 80	—	—	—	—	1970	—	Partially replaced by SH 20
US 81 Alt.	—	—	Fort Worth	Edgecliff	1940	1950	
Bus. US 81	2.31	3.72	US 287/US 81 north of Alvord	US 287/US 81 in Alvord	1991	current	Former Loop 249
US 81 Bus.	—	—	—	—	1957	1990	Replaced by SH 343
US 81 Bus.	—	—	—	—	1971	1975	
US 81 Bus.	—	—	—	—	—	1990	Replaced by SH 132
US 81 Bus.	—	—	—	—	1957	1990	Became US 84 and SH 2
US 81 Bus.	—	—	—	—	1963	1992	Redesignated as Loop 353 (south section) and Loop 368 (north section)
Bus. US 81	4.67	7.52	US 287/US 81 south of Decatur	US 287/US 81 north of Decatur	1991	current	Former Loop 357
Bus. US 81	1.77	2.85	US 287/US 81 in Rhome	US 287/US 81 north of Rhome	1991	current	Former Loop 506
Bus. US 82	3.11	5.01	US 82/US 277 in Holliday	US 82/US 277 in Holliday	2006	current	Concurrent with Bus. US 277 for its entire length
Bus. US 82	5.15	8.29	US 82 in Paris	US 82 in Paris	1991	current	Former Loop 469
Bus. US 82	2.67	4.30	US 82 in Clarksville	US 82 in Clarksville	2006	current	Short overlap with Bus. SH 37
Bus. US 82	0.81	1.30	US 82 in Avery	US 82 in Avery	1991	current	Former Spur 37
Bus. US 83	10.37	16.69	US 83/US 84 in Abilene	US 83/US 277 in Abilene	1991	current	Former Loop 243
US 83 Bus.	—	—	—	—	1991	1991	Former Loop 420, transferred to Business I-35-A
Bus. US 83	1.06	1.71	US 83	US 83	1991	current	Former Loop 88
Bus. US 83	51.10	82.24	I-2/US 83/Spur 206 in Harlingen	I-2/US 83 near La Joya	1991	current	Former Loop 374; longest business loop in Texas
US 83 Temp.	—	—	Junction	Uvalde	1936	1942	Became US 377 and SH 55
US 83 Temp.	—	—	Junction	Big Paint	1942	1949	Became IH 10 and SH 41
US 84 Bus.	—	—	—	—	1943	1965	Replaced by US 84
Bus. US 84	36.00	57.94	US 84/CR 9657 in Lubbock	US 84/FM 2641 in Lubbock	2020	current	Former routing of US 84
Bus. US 84	3.93	6.32	US 84 in Slaton	US 84 in Slaton	1991	current	Former Loop 251
Bus. US 84	7.75	12.47	US 84	US 84	1991	current	Former Loop 401
Bus. US 84	3.04	4.89	US 84	US 84	1991	current	Former Loop 367
Bus. US 84	2.24	3.60	US 84	US 84	1991	current	Former Loop 544
Bus. US 84	2.10	3.38	US 84 in Teague	US 84 in Teague	1991	current	Former Loop 255
Bus. US 87	—	—	—	—	—	1990	Replaced by Loop 345
Bus. US 87	—	—	—	—	1963	1992	Former routing of US 87, replaced by Loop 345
Bus. US 87	0.47	0.76	US 54 in Dalhart	US 87 in Dalhart	1991	current	Former Loop 276
Bus. US 87	—	—	—	—	1992	2010	Former US 87, returned to the city of Lubbock
Bus. US 87	1.75	2.82	US 87 in Lamesa	US 87 in Lamesa	1991	current	Former Loop 218
Bus. US 87	5.50	8.85	near Mitchell Road in Big Spring	I-20 north of Big Spring	2013	current	Unsigned, portion of US 87
Bus. US 87	2.12	3.41	US 87 in Stockdale	US 87 east of Stockdale	1991	current	Former Loop 411
US 90 Alt.	175.3	282.1	I-10/FM 464 west of Seguin	I-610 in Houston	1942	current	Former US 90, SH 3 and SH 200
Bus. US 90	14.10	22.69	I-610/US 90 in Houston	US 90/FM 2100 in Barrett	1992	current	Former routing of US 90
Bus. US 90	6.12	9.85	I-10/US 90 west of Orange	I-10/US 90 east of Orange	1991	current	Former Loop 358
US 90 Byp.	—	—	—	—	1940	1941	Became US 90 (now I-10) and US 90 Alt.
Bus. US 96	1.33	2.14	US 96	SH 62 at Buna	1991	current	Former Spur 68
Bus. US 96	5.22	8.40	US 96	US 96	1991	current	Former Loop 498
Bus. US 175	—	—	—	—	1991	2002	Former Loop 219
Bus. US 175	2.43	3.91	US 175	US 175	1991	current	Former Loop 346
Bus. US 175	2.94	4.73	US 175	US 175 northeast of Mabank	1991	current	Former routing of US 175
Bus. US 175	4.871	7.839	FM 317 southeast of Athens	FM 317 northeast of Athens	2004	current	Former routing of US 175
Bus. US 175	1.0	1.6	US 175	US 175	2019	current	Former routing of US 175
Bus. US 180	—	—	—	—	—	1985	Replaced by SH 20; was co-signed with Bus. US 85
Bus. US 181	2.94	4.73	US 181	SH 80/SH 123	1991	current	Former portion of FM 1144
Bus. US 181	1.40	2.25	US 181	SH 80/SH 123	1991	current	Former portion of SH 80
Bus. US 181	0.82	1.32	SH 72	US 181	1991	current	Former Spur 258
Bus. US 181	2.63	4.23	US 181	SH 72	1991	current	Former Spur 259
Bus. US 181	9.12	14.68	US 181	US 181	1991	current	Former Loop 516
Bus. US 183	3.30	5.31	US 183	US 183	2006	current	Former routing of US 183/US 277/US 283
Bus. US 183	—	—	Cedar Park Drive in Cedar Park	Buttercup Creek Boulevard in Cedar Park	2019	2019	Temporary designation during US 183 construction; became mainline US 183
Bus. US 183	2.58	4.15	US 183	US 183	1995	current	Former routing of US 183
US 183 Temp.	—	—	Albany	Baird	1938	1945	Became US 80 (now IH 20) and US 80 Alt. (now US 180 and SH 351)
Bus. US 190	4.50	7.24	US 190	US 190	2010	current	Former routing of US 190
Bus. US 190	9.09	14.63	I-14/US 190 in Killeen	I-14/US 190 in Nolanville	1991	current	Former Loop 518
Bus. US 190	2.30	3.70	US 190	US 190	2010	current	Former routing of US 190
Bus. US 190	4.90	7.89	point east of Knob Hill Road	point west of CR 104	2023	current	Former routing of US 190/SH 36
Bus. US 259	6.60	10.62	US 259	US 259	2006	current	Former routing of US 259
Bus. US 271	4.90	7.89	US 82	US 271	1991	current	Former Loop 480
Bus. US 271	1.08	1.74	US 271	US 271	1991	current	Former Loop 167
Bus. US 271	1.60	2.57	FM 909	US 271	1991	current	Former Loop 38
Bus. US 271	5.40	8.69	US 271/SH 49	US 271	1991	current	Former Loop 419
Bus. US 271	1.8	2.9	US 271	US 271	2016	current	Former Loop 238
Bus. US 277	6.406	10.309	I-44/US 277/US 281/US 287	US 82	1998	current	
Bus. US 277	3.500	5.633	US 277 northeast of FM 440	US 277 southwest of FM 440	2006	current	Former routing of US 277
Bus. US 277	3.300	5.311	US 183	US 183	2006	current	Concurrent with US 183 Bus. and US 283 Bus.
Bus. US 277	2.003	3.224	US 277	US 277	1991	current	Former Loop 203
Bus. US 277	4.091	6.584	US 277	US 277	2004	current	Former routing of US 277
Bus. US 277	1.353	2.177	US 277/SH 283	US 277	1991	current	Former Loop 566
Bus. US 277	3.162	5.089	US 277	US 57	1991	current	Former Loop 431
Bus. US 277	1.863	2.998	US 277	FM 267	2007	current	Former routing of US 277
US 281 Alt.	16.7	26.9	I-37/US 281 near Sunniland	I-37/US 281 north of Campbellton	1982	current	Former routing of US 281
Bus. US 281	7.911	12.732	US 281	US 281	1999	current	Former routing of US 281
Bus. US 281	1.841	2.963	15th Street in Falfurrias	Taylor Road in Falfurrias	2004	current	Former routing of US 281
Bus. US 281	2.867	4.614	US 281	US 281	1994	current	Former routing of US 281
Bus. US 281	7.228	11.632	US 281	US 281	1991	current	Former Loop 113
US 281 Temp.	—	—	Mineral Wells	Stephenville	1936	1936	Became US 80 (now I-20), US 180, SH 16 and SH 180
US 281 Temp.	—	—	Pharr	Brownsville	1939	1945	Became US 83
Bus. US 283	3.3	5.3	US 183	US 183	2006	current	
Bus. US 287	—	—	—	—	1991	1991	Former Loop 395, returned to Loop designation
Bus. US 287	—	—	—	—	1991	1991	Former Loop 362, returned to Loop designation
Bus. US 287	5.60	9.01	US 287	US 287	1991	current	Former Loop 417 and Loop 488
Bus. US 287	8.50	13.68	US 287	US 287	1991	current	Former Loop 477
Bus. US 287	38.60	62.12	US 287/US 81	US 287	1991	current	Former Loop 496
Bus. US 287	2.70	4.35	US 287	US 287	2003	current	Former routing of US 287
Bus. US 287	8.30	13.36	US 287	US 287	1991	current	Former Loop 528 and Spur 394
Bus. US 287	5.10	8.21	US 287/I-45	US 287	1994	current	Former routing of US 287
Bus. US 287	0.807	1.299	I-45	Bus I-45-F	1991	current	Former Spur 565
Bus. US 287	3.019	4.859	US 287	US 287	2003	current	Former Loop 531
Bus. US 290	4.59	7.39	US 290/SH 36 west of Brenham	US 290	1991	current	Former Loop 318 and former portion of SH 105
Bus. US 290	16.99	27.34	US 290/SH 6	US 290/SH 6	1995	current	Former US 290/SH 6
Bus. US 290	1.40	2.25	US 290/SH 6	US 290/SH 6	1993	current	Former routing of US 290
Bus. US 377	4.890	7.870	US 377	US 377	1991	current	Former Loop 441
Bus. US 377	1.102	1.773	US 377	US 377	1991	current	Former Loop 476
Bus. US 377	0.773	1.244	US 377	US 377	1991	current	Former Loop 475
Bus. US 377	3.022	4.863	US 377	US 377	1992	current	Former Loop 387
Bus. US 377	2.500	4.023	US 377	US 377	2012	current	Former routing of US 377
Bus. US 377	3.506	5.642	US 377	US 377	1991	current	Former Loop 426
Bus. US 377	4.324	6.959	US 377	US 377/US 67	1991	current	Former Loop 195
Bus. US 380	—	—	—	—	1991	2007	Former Loop 129, redesignated as Loop 373
Bus. US 380	2.405	3.870	US 380	US 380	1991	current	Former Loop 569
Bus. US 380	1.513	2.435	US 380	US 380	1991	current	Former Loop 462
Former
