= Special routes of U.S. Route 81 =

Special routes of U.S. Route 81

Highway system
- United States Numbered Highway System; List; Special; Divided

U.S. Route 81 has eight special routes. Three are in Texas, one in Oklahoma, two in Kansas, and two in North Dakota.

== Texas ==
There are officially three business routes of US 81 designated by the Texas Department of Transportation (TxDOT). Additional former alignments of US 81 are designated as state highway loops and state highway spurs, while others became business routes of Interstate 35 (I-35) after US 81 was eliminated south of Fort Worth in 1991.

=== San Antonio ===
State Highway Loop 353
- Location: San Antonio
- Existed: 1961–present

Loop 353 is the former routing of US 81 in southern San Antonio, formed in 1961 when US 81 was rerouted onto the I-35 freeway to the east. It was originally marked as a business route of US 81.

State Highway Loop 368
- Location: San Antonio
- Existed: 1962–present

Loop 368 is the former routing of US 81 in northern San Antonio, formed in 1962 when US 81 was rerouted onto the I-35 freeway to the east. It was originally marked as a business route of US 81.

=== Rhome ===
Business U.S. Highway 81-E
- Location: Rhome
- Length: 1.776 mi (2.858 km)
- Existed: 1990–present

Business U.S. Highway 81-E (Bus. US 81-E) is the former route of US 81 and US 287 through Rhome. The route was originally designated as Loop 506 on May 31, 1972, and signed as a business route of US 81 and US 287; the portion south of its intersection with Spur 440 (numbered the same day as a redesignation of SH 114 through Rhome) was also signed as a business route of SH 114. Loop 506 was cancelled and transferred to Business US 81 on June 21, 1990.

=== Decatur ===
Business U.S. Highway 81-D
- Location: Decatur
- Length: 4.669 mi (7.514 km)
- Existed: 1990–present

Business U.S. Highway 81-D (Bus. US 81-D) is the former route of US 81 and US 287 through Decatur. The route was originally designated as Loop 357 on April 30, 1962. Loop 357 was cancelled and transferred to Business US 81 on June 21, 1990.

=== Alvord ===
Business U.S. Highway 81-C
- Location: Alvord
- Length: 2.307 mi (3.713 km)
- Existed: 1990–present

Business U.S. Highway 81-C (Bus. US 81-C) is the former route of US 81 and US 287 through Alvord. The route was originally designated as Loop 249 on June 16, 1980. Loop 249 was cancelled and transferred to Business US 81 on June 21, 1990. Although not officially designated as Business US 287, the route is cosigned as such from the US 81/US 287 bypass and at the junction with FM 1655.

== Oklahoma ==
=== Rush Springs ===
U.S. Highway 81 Business
- Location: Rush Springs
- Existed: 1971–present

The southernmost Business US-81 in Oklahoma is in the town of Rush Springs, Oklahoma. It begins south of the town, following Rush Street into the central business district. In the middle of downtown Rush Springs, there is a four way stop with Blakeley Avenue. Blakeley carries Oklahoma State Highway 17, which has its eastern terminus at Business US-81. The business route continues north on Rush Street before angling to the northwest to rejoin mainline US-81.

Business US-81 in Rush Springs is signed with a US-81 shield with a small "B" appended after the number. This method of signing business routes is unusual for Oklahoma.

Business US-81 was originally part of mainline US-81. On May 10, 1971, US-81 was relocated to run west of town, and Business US-81 was designated along the old alignment.

== Kansas ==
=== McPherson ===
U.S. Highway 81 Business
- Location: McPherson
- Length: 7.6 mi (12.2 km)
- Existed: 1970–present

Business US-81 in Kansas is in McPherson. This route is 6 miles (9.7 km) long. It begins at the intersection of I-135, US-81, and US-56 east of McPherson. It goes west on Kansas Ave. for about two miles (3 km) in a concurrency with US-56 and turns south on Main Street for 2 miles (3.2 km), passing Central Christian College and National Cooperative Refinery Association. At K-61, it exits east in a 2 miles (3.2 km) "wrong-way" concurrency with K-61 before ending at I-135 and US-81 southeast of McPherson.

BUS US-81 in McPherson first appeared on the Kansas Department of Transportation Map in 1970 when Interstate 35W (now Interstate 135) was completed between McPherson and Salina.

=== Lindsborg ===
U.S. Highway 81 Business
- Location: Lindsborg
- Existed: 1970–2012

Former Business US-81 in Lindsborg began at the intersection of Interstate 135, US-81, and K-4 north of Lindsborg on an older routing of US-81. It shared a 4 miles (6.4 km) concurrency with K-4, which turns to the west in south Lindsborg. At this junction, it went for another mile south before turning east on Smoky Valley Road, ending 3 miles (4.8 km) later at I-135 and US-81. This BUS US-81 had a total length of 8 miles (13 km).

The Lindsborg business loop first appeared in 1970, at the same time as the McPherson loop.

== North Dakota ==
=== Fargo ===
U.S. Highway 81 Business
- Location: Fargo
- Length: 11.3 mi (18.2 km)

Business US-81 in Fargo starts at I-29/US-81 exit 60, heading east on 52nd Avenue South to University Drive South. It continues north on University Drive to 13th Avenue South. At this point, northbound and southbound traffic splits. Northbound traffic continues east on 13th Avenue South to 10th Street South, while southbound traffic remains on University Drive. The split continues to 19th Avenue North, where the northern terminus is reached at I-29/US-81 exit 67.

=== Grand Forks ===
U.S. Highway 81 Business
- Location: Grand Forks
- Length: 9.5 mi (15.3 km)

Business U.S. Highway 81 (US 81 Bus.) starts off at its northern terminus (I-29/US-81 exit 138 at the 32nd Avenue exit), where it travels east on 32nd Avenue South to South Washington Street, and follows Washington Street to its northern terminus (I-29 exit 145 at the North Washington Street exit).
