= Goodlett, Texas =

Unincorporated community in Texas, US

- Unincorporated community
- Location in Texas
- Coordinates: 34°20′06″N 99°52′48″W
- Country: United States
- State: Texas
- County: Hardeman
- Named for: J. B. Goodlett
- Elevation: 1,562 ft (476 m)

Population (2000)
  - Total: 80
- GNIS feature ID: 1358156
- Census code: 30176

Goodlett, formerly Gypsum, is an unincorporated community in Hardeman County, Texas, United States.

== History ==
Goodlett is situated on U.S. Route 287, Farm to Market Road 2363 and the Fort Worth and Denver Railway. It was originally called Gypsum for the abundance of the mineral. In 1909, the name was changed to Goodlett, after J. B. Goodlett, a rancher who was headquartered nearby. As of 2000, the population was 80.
