= Stratford High School (Stratford, Texas) =

Location
- 503 North 8th Street; Stratford, Texas 79084-0108; United States; 36.340969°N 102.076592°W

Information
- School type: Public high school
- School district: Stratford Independent School District
- Principal: Eddie Metcalf (Interim)
- Teaching staff: 22.83 (on an FTE basis)
- Grades: 9-12
- Enrollment: 165 (2023–2024)
- Student to teacher ratio: 7.23
- Colors: Royal Blue & White
- Athletics conference: UIL Class 2A D1
- Mascot: Elks/Lady Elks
- Yearbook: The Elk
- Website: Stratford High School

Stratford High School is a public high school located in Stratford, Texas (USA) and classified as a 2A school by the UIL. It is part of the Stratford Independent School District located in central Sherman County. In 2015, the school was rated "Met Standard" by the Texas Education Agency.

== Athletics ==
The Stratford Elks compete in these sports -

- Basketball
- Cross Country
- Football
- Golf
- Track and field

=== State Titles ===
- Boys Basketball -
  - 1946(B)
- Girls Basketball -
  - 1969(1A), 1976(1A)
- Football -
  - 2000(1A), 2005(1A), 2008(1A/D2), 2021(2A/D2)
