= Stratford, Texas =

City in Texas, US

- City
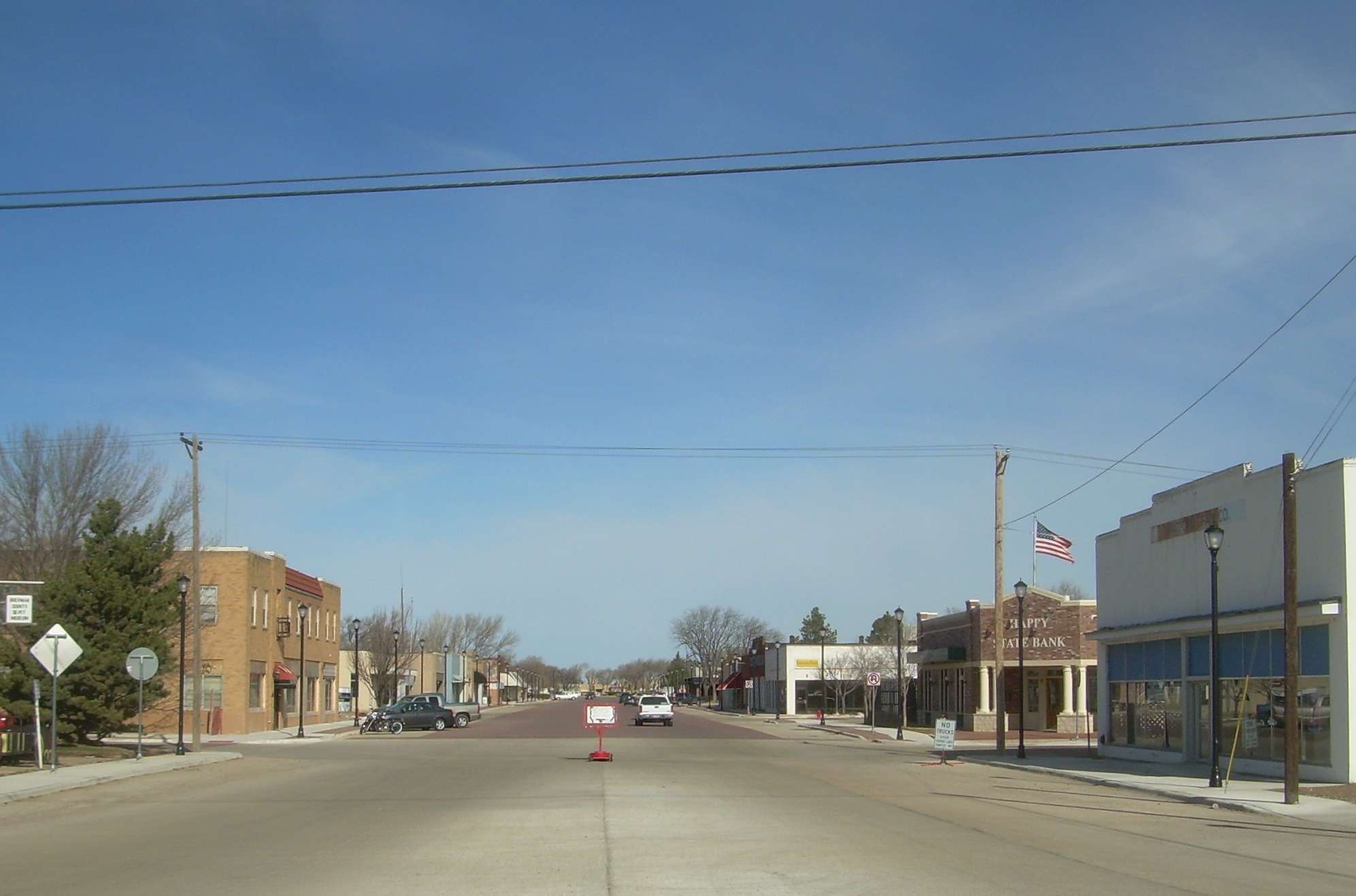
- Stratford, 2006

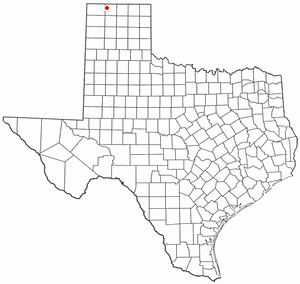
- Location of Stratford, Texas

- Coordinates: 36°20′15″N 102°04′34″W
- Country: United States
- State: Texas
- County: Sherman
- Settled: c. 1885
- Named for: Stratford Hall

Area
  - Total: 2.31 sq mi (5.98 km^{2})
  - Land: 2.31 sq mi (5.98 km^{2})
  - Water: 0 sq mi (0.00 km^{2})
- Elevation: 3,694 ft (1,126 m)

Population (2020)
  - Total: 1,939
  - Density: 840/sq mi (324/km^{2})
- Time zone: UTC−6 (Central (CST))
  - Summer (DST): UTC−5 (CDT)
- ZIP code: 79084
- Area code: 806
- FIPS code: 48-70544
- GNIS feature ID: 2411988
- Website: stratfordtx.us

Stratford is a small city and county seat of Sherman County, Texas, United States. Its population was 1,939 at the 2020 Census, down from 2,017 in 2010.

== History ==
Stratford was first settled around 1885, when a man named Aaron Norton bought 100 parcels of land from the Chicago, Rock Island and Gulf Railway. His manager, Walter Colton, named it for Stratford Hall, the childhood home of Robert E. Lee, whom he admired. A post office was established in 1900. In July 1901, Stratford was voted county seat, replacing Coldwater. In 1928, the Panhandle and Santa Fe Railway was connected to Stratford. The city was incorporated at some point before 1940.

== Geography ==
According to the United States Census Bureau, the city has a total area of 2.0 square miles (5.3 km^{2}), all land.

Stratford is situated in the Llano Estacado. The Rita Blance National Grasslands are due west of the city.

=== Climate ===
Stratford has a cold semi-arid climate (BSk) with long, hot summers and short, cool, and somewhat snowy winters.

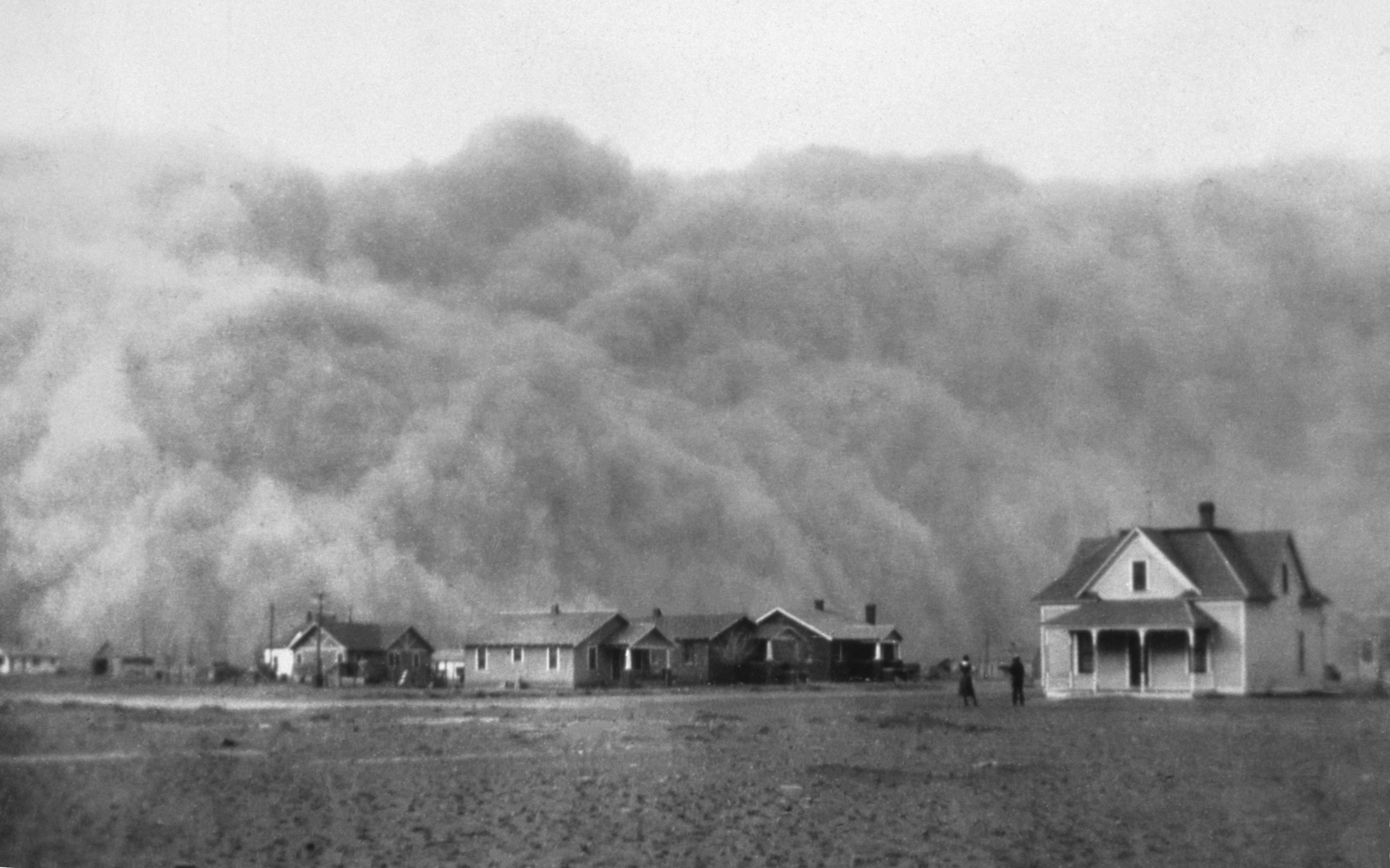
A dust storm is approaching Stratford on April 18, 1935.

Climate data for Stratford, Texas (1981–2010)
Month	Jan	Feb	Mar	Apr	May	Jun	Jul	Aug	Sep	Oct	Nov	Dec	Year
Mean daily maximum °F (°C)	48.3 (9.1)	51.5 (10.8)	59.9 (15.5)	69.2 (20.7)	78.0 (25.6)	87.1 (30.6)	91.5 (33.1)	89.4 (31.9)	82.2 (27.9)	70.8 (21.6)	58.5 (14.7)	47.6 (8.7)	69.5 (20.8)
Mean daily minimum °F (°C)	19.7 (−6.8)	22.1 (−5.5)	29.3 (−1.5)	37.6 (3.1)	48.1 (8.9)	58.0 (14.4)	62.9 (17.2)	61.8 (16.6)	53.3 (11.8)	40.5 (4.7)	28.7 (−1.8)	20.2 (−6.6)	40.2 (4.6)
Average precipitation inches (mm)	0.53 (13)	0.45 (11)	1.26 (32)	1.24 (31)	2.24 (57)	2.21 (56)	2.24 (57)	2.59 (66)	1.68 (43)	1.29 (33)	0.69 (18)	0.72 (18)	17.15 (436)
Average snowfall inches (cm)	5.4 (14)	2.9 (7.4)	4.3 (11)	1.4 (3.6)	0.1 (0.25)	0.0 (0.0)	0.0 (0.0)	0.0 (0.0)	0.0 (0.0)	0.2 (0.51)	2.0 (5.1)	5.1 (13)	21.4 (54)
Source: NOAA

== Demographics ==
Historical population
Census	Pop.	Note	%±
1910	520		—
1920	472		−9.2%
1930	873		85.0%
1940	877		0.5%
1950	1,385		57.9%
1960	1,380		−0.4%
1970	2,139		55.0%
1980	1,917		−10.4%
1990	1,781		−7.1%
2000	1,991		11.8%
2010	2,017		1.3%
2020	1,939		−3.9%
U.S. Decennial Census

=== 2020 census ===
As of the 2020 census, Stratford had a population of 1,939, 663 households, and 554 families residing in the city. The median age was 33.3 years, with 30.8% of residents under 18 and 14.3% aged 65 or older; for every 100 females there were 104.1 males and for every 100 females age 18 and over there were 100.1 males.

0.0% of residents lived in urban areas, while 100.0% lived in rural areas.

There were 663 households in Stratford; 43.1% had children under 18, 59.3% were married-couple households, 15.5% were headed by a male with no spouse or partner present, and 20.4% were headed by a female with no spouse or partner present. About 20.6% of households consisted of individuals and 12.5% had someone living alone who was 65 or older.

There were 764 housing units, of which 13.2% were vacant. The homeowner vacancy rate was 3.1% and the rental vacancy rate was 21.0%.

The racial composition as of the 2020 census was the following:

Race	Number	Percent
White	1,053	54.3%
Black or African American	10	0.5%
American Indian and Alaska Native	30	1.5%
Asian	2	0.1%
Native Hawaiian and Other Pacific Islander	0	0.0%
Some other race	400	20.6%
Two or more races	444	22.9%
Hispanic or Latino (of any race)	1,046	53.9%

=== 2000 census ===
At the 2000 Census, 1,991 people, 722 households, and 535 families were living in the city. The population density was 980.2 inhabitants per square mile (378.5/km^{2}). The 794 housing units had an average density of 390.9 per square mile (150.9/km^{2}). The racial makeup of the city was 83.02% White, 0.30% African American, 0.65% Native American, 0.05% Asian, 14.41% from other races, and 1.56% from two or more races. Hispanics or Latinos of any race were 30.44%.

Of the 722 households, 39.2% had children under 18 living with them, 64.1% were married couples living together, 6.9% had a female householder with no husband present, and 25.9% were not families. About 24.4% of households were one person and 11.4% were one person 65 or older. The average household size was 2.68 and the average family size was 3.21.

The age distribution was 30.5% under 18, 6.6% from 18 to 24, 26.0% from 25 to 44, 21.4% from 45 to 64, and 15.5% 65 or older. The median age was 36 years. For every 100 females, there were 98.3 males. For every 100 females age 18 and over, there were 92.8 males.

The median household income was $32,656 and the median family income was $37,955. Males had a median income of $27,113 versus $19,524 for females. The per capita income for the city was $16,790. About 11.2% of families and 13.8% of the population were below the poverty line, including 18.7% of those under age 18 and 13.8% of those age 65 or over.

== Transportation ==
Stratford is at the intersection of US Routes 54 and 287, and is the western terminus of Texas State Highway 15.

The nearest major airport, Liberal Mid-America Regional Airport, is 82 miles and two states away in Liberal, Kansas, although Rick Husband Amarillo International Airport is only slightly further away, at 91 miles.

== Education ==
The city of Stratford is served by the Stratford Independent School District, and is home to Stratford High School.

The Texas Legislature assigns all of Sherman County to the Borger Junior College District.
