= Ashtola, Texas =

Unincorporated community in Texas, US

Ashtola
- Unincorporated community
- Location in Texas
- Coordinates: 35.0064389°N 101.0434843°W
- Country: United States
- State: Texas
- County: Donley
- Elevation: 2,923 ft (891 m)

Ashtola is an unincorporated community in Donley County, Texas, United States.

Situated on U.S. Route 287, the town was built upon a stop of the Fort Worth and Denver Railway, beginning in early 1906. A post office called Southard was opened in March of the same year, and operated until April 6, 1956. In 1916, resident W. A. Poovey attempted to rename the town from Southard to Poovieville, but other residents decided on Ashtola. The town declined after being bypassed by Interstate 40 in the 1950s, and as of 2000, had an estimated 25 residents, a growth from 20 between 1970 and 1990.
