= Harrison S. Kerrick =

American railroad executive and army officer (1873–1939)

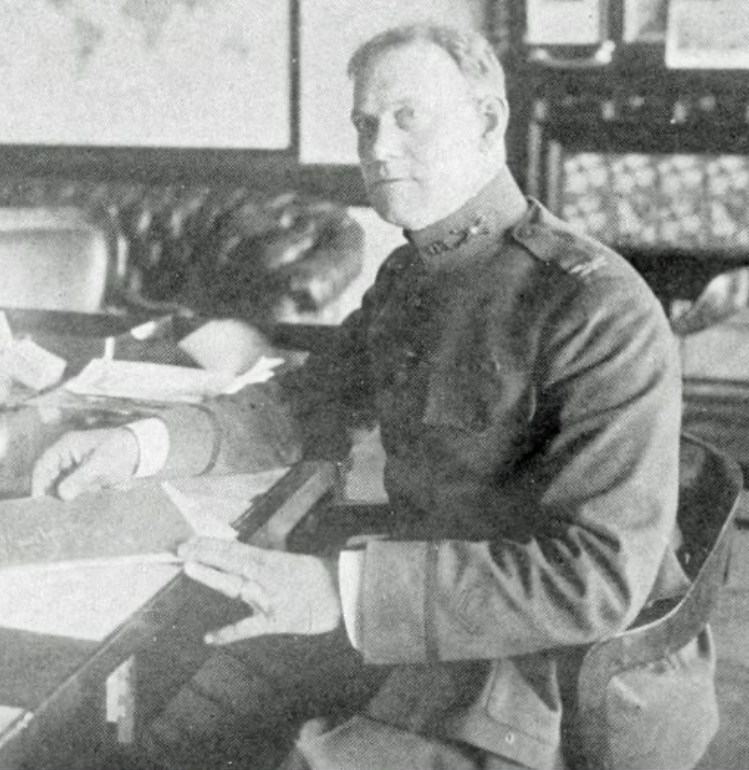
- Born: Harrison Summers Kerrick; October 13, 1873; Minonk, Illinois
- Died: May 15, 1939 (aged 65); Army and Navy Hospital, Hot Springs, Arkansas
- Education: Illinois Wesleyan University; Northern Illinois Normal School
- Military career
- Allegiance: United States
- Branch: Army
- Rank: Colonel
- War: Spanish–American War; Philippine–American War; World War I

Colonel Harrison Summers Kerrick (October 13, 1873 – May 15, 1939) was an American railroad executive, United States Army officer and author.

== Biography ==
Kerrick was born on October 13, 1873 in Minonk, Illinois, the son of Josiah Kerrick and his wife Margaret Hollenback. His father was a businessman and politician who served several terms as mayor of Minonk. Kerrick had three sisters.

Kerrick attended Illinois Wesleyan University in Bloomington, Illinois, from 1890 to 1892. He then transferred to Northern Illinois Normal School in Dixon, Illinois, earning a B.S. degree in 1894. After graduation, Kerrick found work as a teacher and school principal in Lostant and Benson, Illinois. In 1898, he enlisted in Company C of the 2nd Illinois Volunteer Infantry, serving in Cuba during the Spanish–American War, during which he was promoted to captain.

Kerrick served as a field artillery officer in the Philippine–American War and accepted a commission in the Regular Army in 1901. He married Lena May Clark on October 21, 1903. Kerrick was promoted to major in May 1917. During World War I, he served as a temporary lieutenant colonel in the United States Army Coast Artillery Corps from December 31, 1917, to February 9, 1918.

Kerrick received a temporary promotion to colonel in March 1918 and was sent to France, where he served as a heavy artillery commandant from August to October 1918. He reverted to his permanent rank of major on June 30, 1920, but was then immediately promoted to lieutenant colonel on July 1, 1920. Kerrick received a permanent promotion to colonel on March 20, 1926.

Kerrick created the code of conduct on the handling and display of the flag of the United States, which was used by United States Congress. He retired in 1934, and died on May 15, 1939, at the Army and Navy Hospital, in Hot Springs, Arkansas, aged 65. Kerrick and his wife are interred at Arlington National Cemetery.

Kerrick is the namesake of Kerrick, Texas.

== Bibliography ==
- Kerrick, Harrison S. (1916). Military and Naval America. United States: Hardpress Publishing. ISBN 978-1314066388.
- Kerrick, Harrison S. (1925). The Flag of the United States Your Flag and Mine.
