= Baylor Creek Reservoir =

Reservoir in Texas, United States

- Location in Texas
- Location: Childress County, Texas, U.S.
- Coordinates: 34°28′16.3″N 100°22′36.7″W

Baylor Creek Reservoir also known as Baylor Lake is a reservoir located northwest of Childress, Texas. The unincorporated community of Carey and Lake Childress are situated to the east of the lake.
