= Business routes of U.S. Route 287 in Texas =

Business U.S. Highway 287

Route information
- Maintained by TxDOT

Location
- Country: United States
- State: Texas

Highway system
- United States Numbered Highway System; List; Special; Divided; Highways in Texas; Interstate; US; State; Former; Toll; Loops; Spurs; FM/RM; Park; Rec

There are currently nine business routes of U.S. Highway 287 in Texas that are designated and maintained by the Texas Department of Transportation (TxDOT). The business routes in the US state of Texas are traditionally short spurs or loops that connect the main route, in this case, U.S. Highway 287 (US 287), to the center or commercial district of a city. The routes commonly follow the course of a decommissioned state highway, or the old course of the main route. Business routes are signed with the traditional US 287 highway shield, and with a small "business plate" placed above the marker. TxDOT regards business routes as official highways, and is responsible for the maintenance of the route.

As of 2010, there are nine official business routes of US 287. There are also two cancelled business routes, both of which were located in Amarillo. Of the nine routes, seven of them are located in Northeast Texas.

== Current routes ==
=== Grapeland ===
Business U.S. Highway 287
- Location: Grapeland
- Length: 3.019 mi (4.859 km)
- Existed: September 26, 2003–present

Business U.S. Highway 287-V (Bus. US 287-V) is located almost entirely within the city limits of Grapeland. The 3.019-mile-long (4.859 km) highway is known as Main Street. The road passes directly through the center of Grapeland. The route was designated on January 20, 1977, as Texas State Highway Loop 531, but was changed to the current business route designation on September 26, 2003.

Major junctions

The entire route is in Houston County.

| Location | mi | km | Destinations | Notes |
|---|---|---|---|---|
| | 0.0 | 0.0 | US 287 / SH 19 | Northern terminus |
| Grapeland | 0.9 | 1.4 | FM 228 | Western terminus of FM 228 |
| Grapeland | 1.3 | 2.1 | FM 227 | Northern end of FM 227 concurrency |
| Grapeland | 1.9 | 3.1 | FM 227 | Southern end of FM 227 concurrency |
| Grapeland | 2.3 | 3.7 | FM 2423 | Western terminus of FM 2423 |
| | | | US 287 / SH 19 | Southern terminus |
1.000 mi = 1.609 km; 1.000 km = 0.621 mi: Concurrency terminus

=== Corsicana ===
Business U.S. Highway 287
- Location: Corsicana
- Length: 0.807 mi (1,299 m)
- Existed: June 21, 1990–present

Business U.S. Highway 287-T (Bus. US 287-T) is located in Corsicana. The route was designated on January 28, 1987, as Texas State Highway Spur 565, but was changed to the current business designation on June 21, 1990.

Major junctions

The entire route is in Corsicana, Navarro County.

| mi | km | Destinations | Notes |
|---|---|---|---|
| 0.0 | 0.0 | US 287 | Southern terminus |
| 0.1 | 0.16 | I-45 | |
| 0.8 | 1.3 | I-45 BL | Northern terminus |
1.000 mi = 1.609 km; 1.000 km = 0.621 mi

=== Ennis ===
Business U.S. Highway 287
- Location: Ennis
- Length: 2.992 mi (4.815 km)
- Existed: June 18, 1996–present

=== Waxahachie ===
Business U.S. Highway 287
- Location: Waxahachie
- Length: 7.927 mi (12.757 km)
- Existed: June 21, 1990–present

=== Midlothian ===
Business U.S. Highway 287
- Location: Midlothian
- Length: 2.915 mi (4.691 km)
- Existed: May 29, 2003–present

=== Mansfield–Fort Worth ===
Business U.S. Highway 287
- Location: Mansfield–Fort Worth
- Length: 38.613 mi (62.142 km)
- Existed: June 21, 1990–present

Business US Highway 287-P (Bus. US 287-P) is a 38.613-mile-long (62.142 km) route that runs through Mansfield, downtown Fort Worth and Saginaw. The highway is known as Main Street while in Mansfield, Mansfield Highway while in southern Fort Worth, Kennedale Parkway in Kennedale, Riverside Drive and Rosedale Street in central Fort Worth, Commerce Street in downtown Fort Worth, Main Street in northern Fort Worth, and Saginaw Boulevard in Saginaw. The highway was originally designated on December 17, 1970, as Texas State Highway Loop 496 (signed as a business route of US 81 and US 287, depending on the US Route that followed that corridor). On November 25, 1975, Loop 496 extended south to FM 157. On June 2, 1982, it extended to US 287. On June 21, 1990, Loop 496 was changed to its current business route designation. On October 25, 1990, the section of Bus. US 287-P in Meacham Field was cancelled. Bus. US 287-P is located almost entirely in Tarrant County, and is mostly located in Fort Worth. On December 16, 2010, Business US 287-P was rerouted along I-35 and Spur 280 rather than along Commerce Street, Main Street, and Rosedale Street. On April 30, 2015, the section of Bus. US 287-P from FM 917 to FM 157 was given to the city of Mansfield, and the section south of FM 917 became part of FM 917. Bus. US 287-P was rerouted north along FM 157 to US 287. On July 27, 2017, FM 157 was rerouted south along FM 917 and US 287, completing the changes in the system. The highway is, as of 2010, the longest business route of US 287, while located in Texas.

=== Wichita Falls–Iowa Park ===
Business U.S. Highway 287
- Location: Wichita Falls–Iowa Park
- Length: 18.787 mi (30.235 km)
- Existed: June 21, 1990–present

=== Electra ===
Business U.S. Highway 287
- Location: Electra
- Length: 8.459 mi (13.613 km)
- Existed: June 21, 1990–present

=== Vernon ===
Business U.S. Highway 287
- Location: Vernon
- Length: 5.596 mi (9.006 km)
- Existed: June 21, 1990–present

Business U.S. Highway 287-F (Bus. US 287-F) is located in Vernon. The 5.596-mile-long (9.006 km) highway is known as College Drive when concurrent with US 70, Hillcrest Drive as a stand-alone road, and Wilbarger Street while concurrent with Loop 488. Most of the route's course is concurrent with Loop 488, which passes directly through downtown Vernon. This was designated as Texas State Highway Spur 417 on October 15, 1965, but was changed to the current business designation on June 21, 1990.

Major junctions

The entire route is in Vernon, Wilbarger County.

| mi | km | Destinations | Notes |
|---|---|---|---|
| 0.0 | 0.0 | US 287 | Northern terminus |
| 0.3 | 0.48 | US 70 | North end of US 70 concurrency |
| 0.4 | 0.64 | US 70 | South end of US 70 concurrency |
| 1.1 | 1.8 | Loop 488 | West end of Loop 488 concurrency |
| 2.6 | 4.2 | US 283 / US 183 | |
| 5.6 | 9.0 | Loop 488 | East end of Loop 488 concurrency |
| 5.6 | 9.0 | US 287 / US 70 | Northbound exit and southbound entrance to US 287/US 70; southern terminus |
1.000 mi = 1.609 km; 1.000 km = 0.621 mi: Concurrency terminus; Incomplete access

== Former routes ==
=== Amarillo ===
Business U.S. Highway 287
- Location: Amarillo
- Existed: June 21, 1990–October 25, 1990

This was redesignated from Loop 395 on June 21, 1990, only to revert to Loop 395 on October 25, 1990.

=== Amarillo ===
Business U.S. Highway 287
- Location: Amarillo
- Existed: June 21, 1990–October 25, 1990

This was redesignated from Loop 362 on June 21, 1990, only to revert to Loop 362 on October 25, 1990.
