= Lake Childress =

Lake in Texas, US

Coordinates: 34°28′05″N 100°21′18″W

Lake Childress, sometimes Childress Lake, is a lake near Childress, Texas.

== Description ==
Lake Childress is located 8 miles northwest of Childress, Texas in the Red River Basin. It is a part of the Baylor Creek reservoir which is the pair of Lake Childress and Baylor Lake. Both lakes are owned by the City of Childress. The two lakes have a combined surface area of 650 acres. The lake is prone to drought causing varying water levels. Due to its high conductivity level, it has been subject to Golden algae kills.

== History ==
In 1923, the reservoir was constructed on a tributary of Baylor Creek. The intended capacity was 4,600 acres. The lake was previously used for water supply in Childress, Texas.

== Aquatic vegetation ==
Lake Childress has coontail, pondweed, flooded trees, cattails, and milfoil.

== Fish ==
The species of fish at Lake Childress include white crappie, largemouth bass, and catfish.
