= Stratford Independent School District =

School district in Texas

Stratford Independent School District is a public school district based in Stratford, Texas (USA). Located in Sherman County, the district extends into a small portion of Dallam County.

In 2009, the school district was rated "recognized" by the Texas Education Agency.

== Schools ==
- Stratford High School
- Stratford Junior High School
- Mary Allen Elementary School
