= Rhome, Texas =

- City
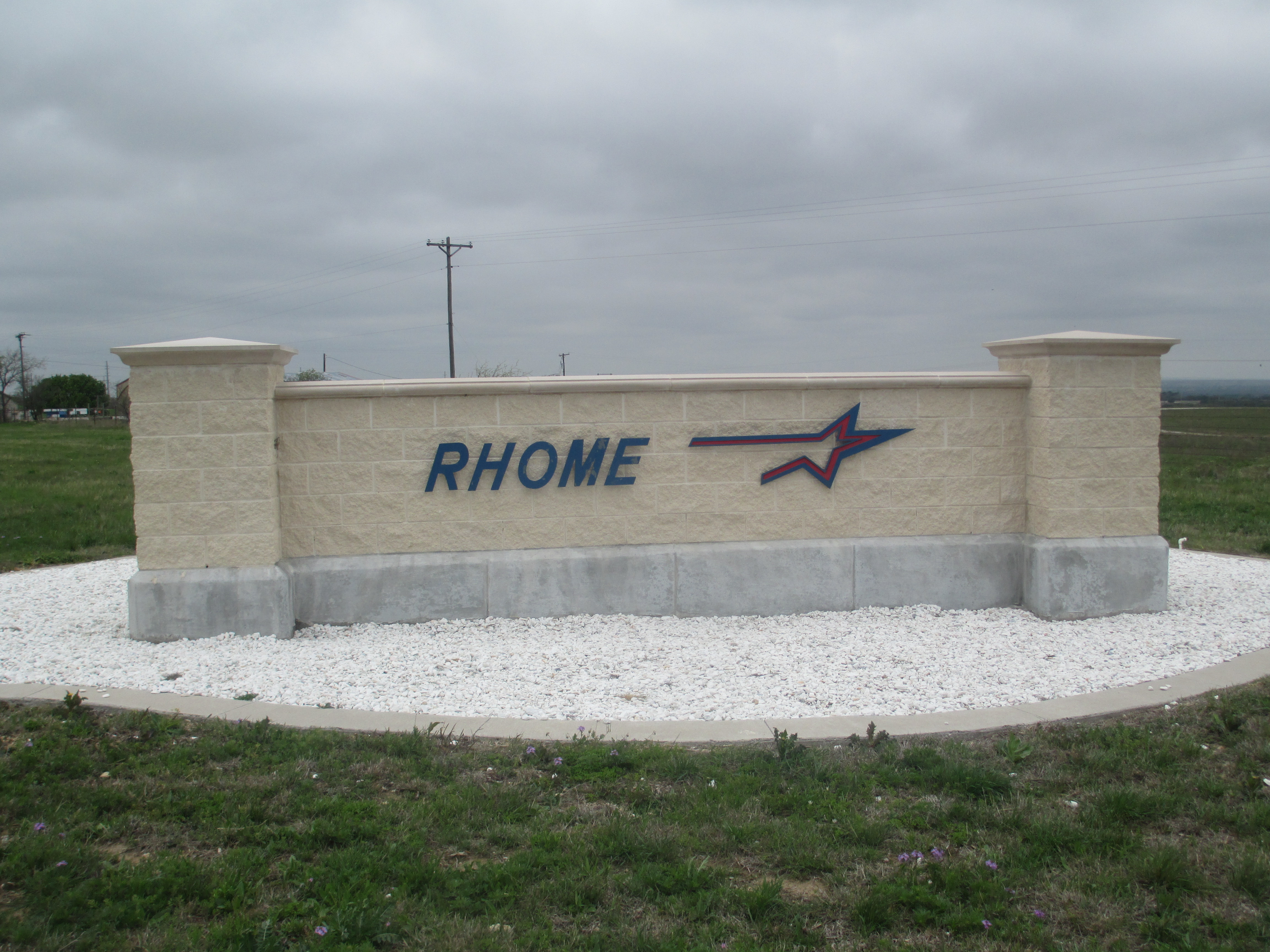
- Rhome sign off of U.S. Route 287

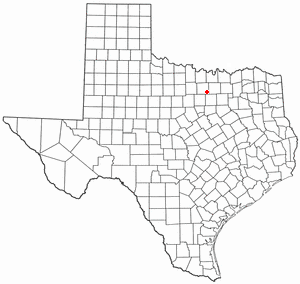
- Location of Rhome, Texas

- Coordinates: 33°04′14″N 97°28′26″W
- Country: United States
- State: Texas
- County: Wise

Area
  - Total: 4.65 sq mi (12.04 km^{2})
  - Land: 4.59 sq mi (11.89 km^{2})
  - Water: 0.054 sq mi (0.14 km^{2})
- Elevation: 883 ft (269 m)

Population (2020)
  - Total: 1,630
  - Density: 355/sq mi (137/km^{2})
- Time zone: UTC-6 (Central (CST))
  - Summer (DST): UTC-5 (CDT)
- ZIP code: 76078
- Area code: 817
- FIPS code: 48-61700
- GNIS feature ID: 2410930
- Website: www.cityofrhome.com

Rhome is a city in Wise County, Texas, United States. Its population was 1,630 in 2020.

Rhome has a large, 12-plaque war exhibit located at Veterans Memorial Park, in a residential area east of the downtown.

== Geography ==
According to the United States Census Bureau, the city has a total area of 4.7 square miles (12 km^{2}), of which 0.1 square miles (0.26 km^{2}) is covered by water.

== Demographics ==
Historical population
Census	Pop.	Note	%±
1940	340		—
1950	461		35.6%
1960	412		−10.6%
1970	393		−4.6%
1980	478		21.6%
1990	605		26.6%
2000	551		−8.9%
2010	1,522		176.2%
2020	1,630		7.1%
2023 (est.)	1,843		13.1%
U.S. Decennial Census

=== 2020 census ===
As of the 2020 census, Rhome had a population of 1,630. The median age was 36.5 years; 26.7% of residents were under 18 and 11.8% were 65 or older. For every 100 females, there were 97.1 males, and for every 100 females 18 and over, there were 94.8 males 18 and over.

None of the residents lived in urban areas, while 100.0% lived in rural areas.

Of the 595 households in Rhome, 39.8% had children under 18 living in them, 60.3% were married-couple households, 15.0% were households with a male householder and no spouse or partner present, and 19.3% were households with a female householder and no spouse or partner present. About 18.5% of all households were made up of individuals, and 8.1% had someone living alone who was 65 or older.

The city had 628 housing units, of which 5.3% were vacant. The homeowner vacancy rate was 1.6% and the rental vacancy rate was 9.4%.

Racial composition as of the 2020 census
Race	Number	Percentage
White	1,316	80.7%
Black or African American	8	0.5%
American Indian and Alaska Native	14	0.9%
Asian	14	0.9%
Native Hawaiian and other Pacific Islander	0	0.0%
Some other race	84	5.2%
Two or more races	194	11.9%
Hispanic or Latino (of any race)	296	18.2%

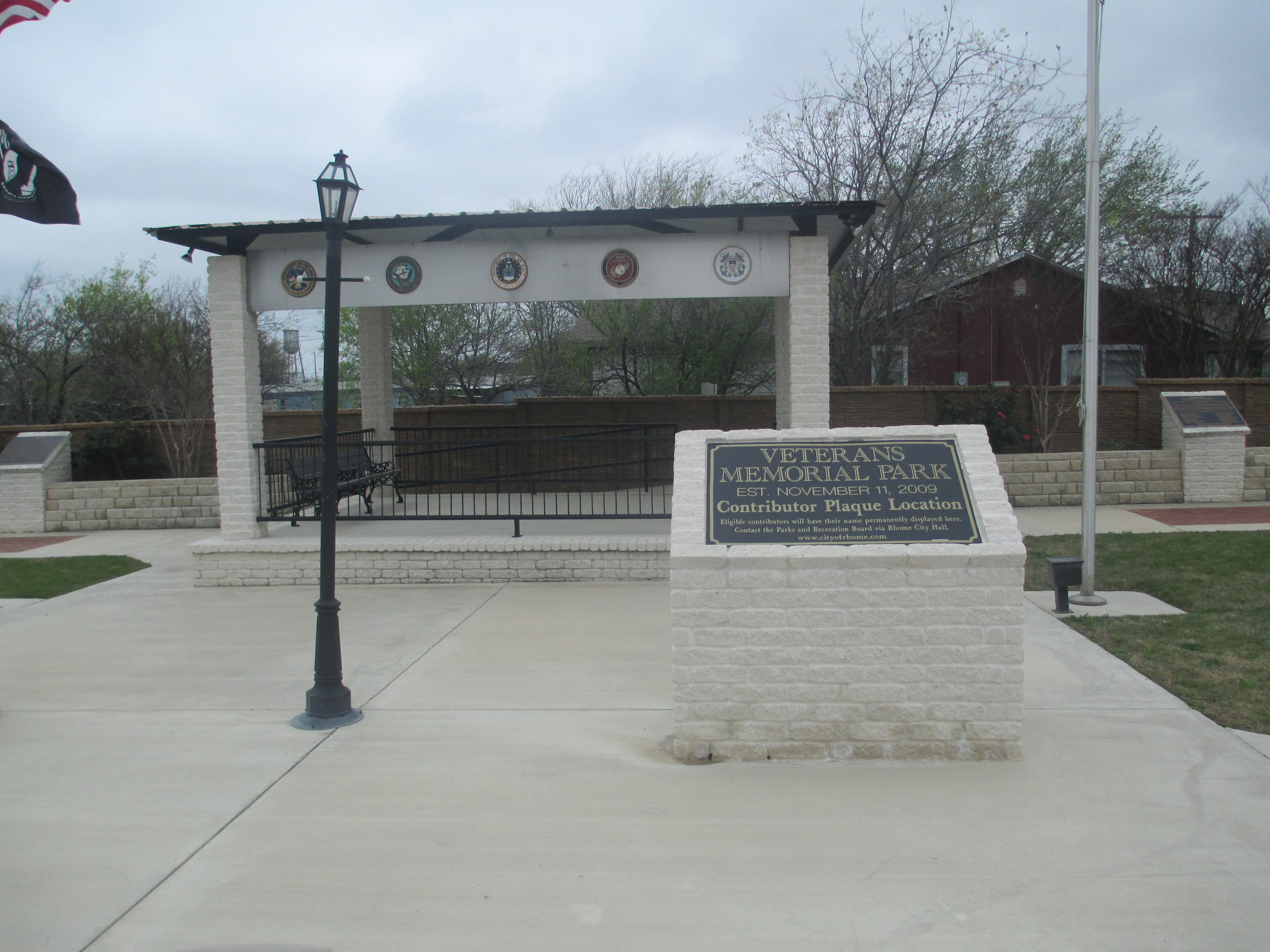
Veterans Memorial Park in Rhome has 12 plaques honoring American service personnel from the wars fought since 1917.

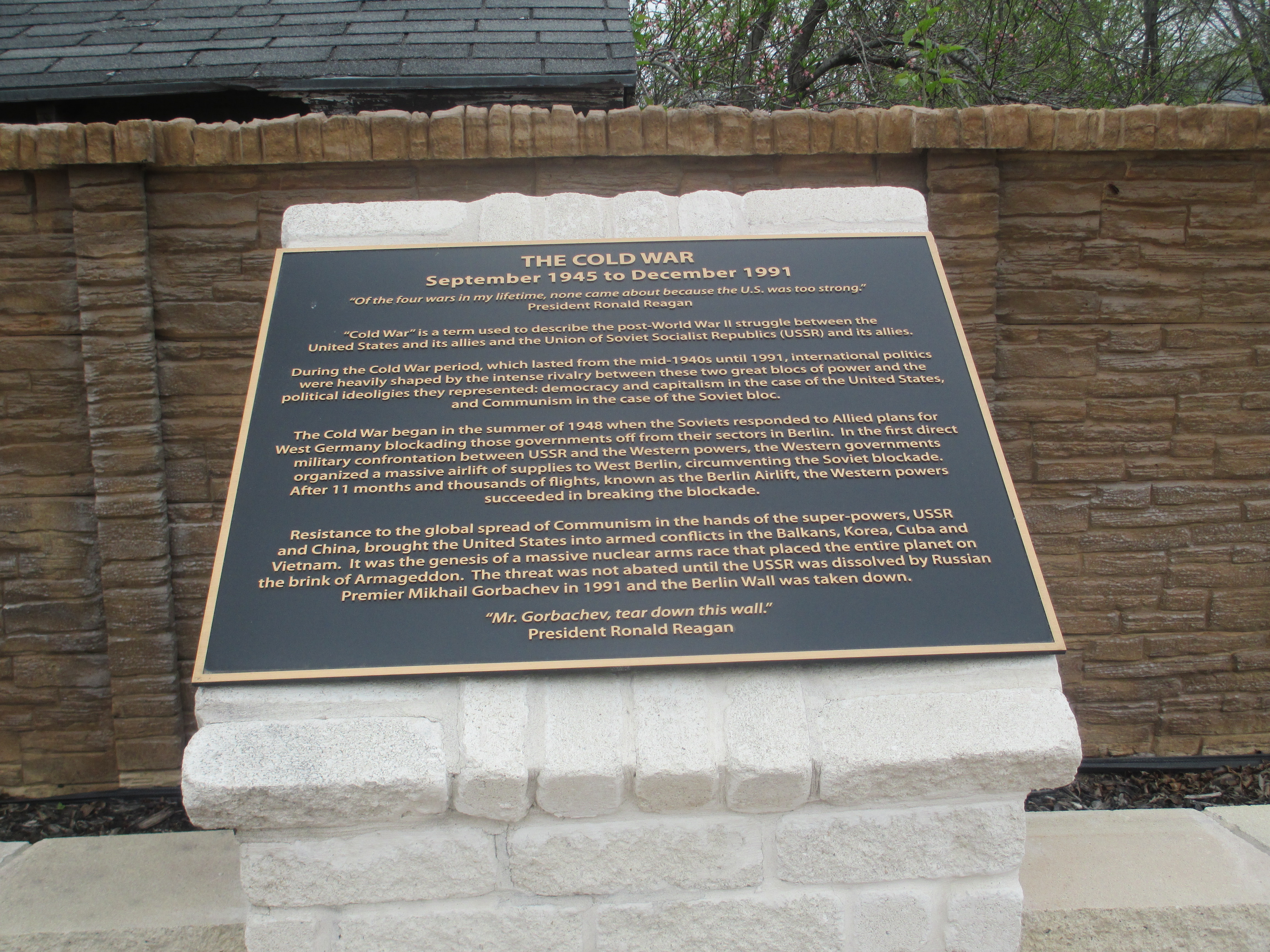
Cold War plaque at Veterans Memorial Park

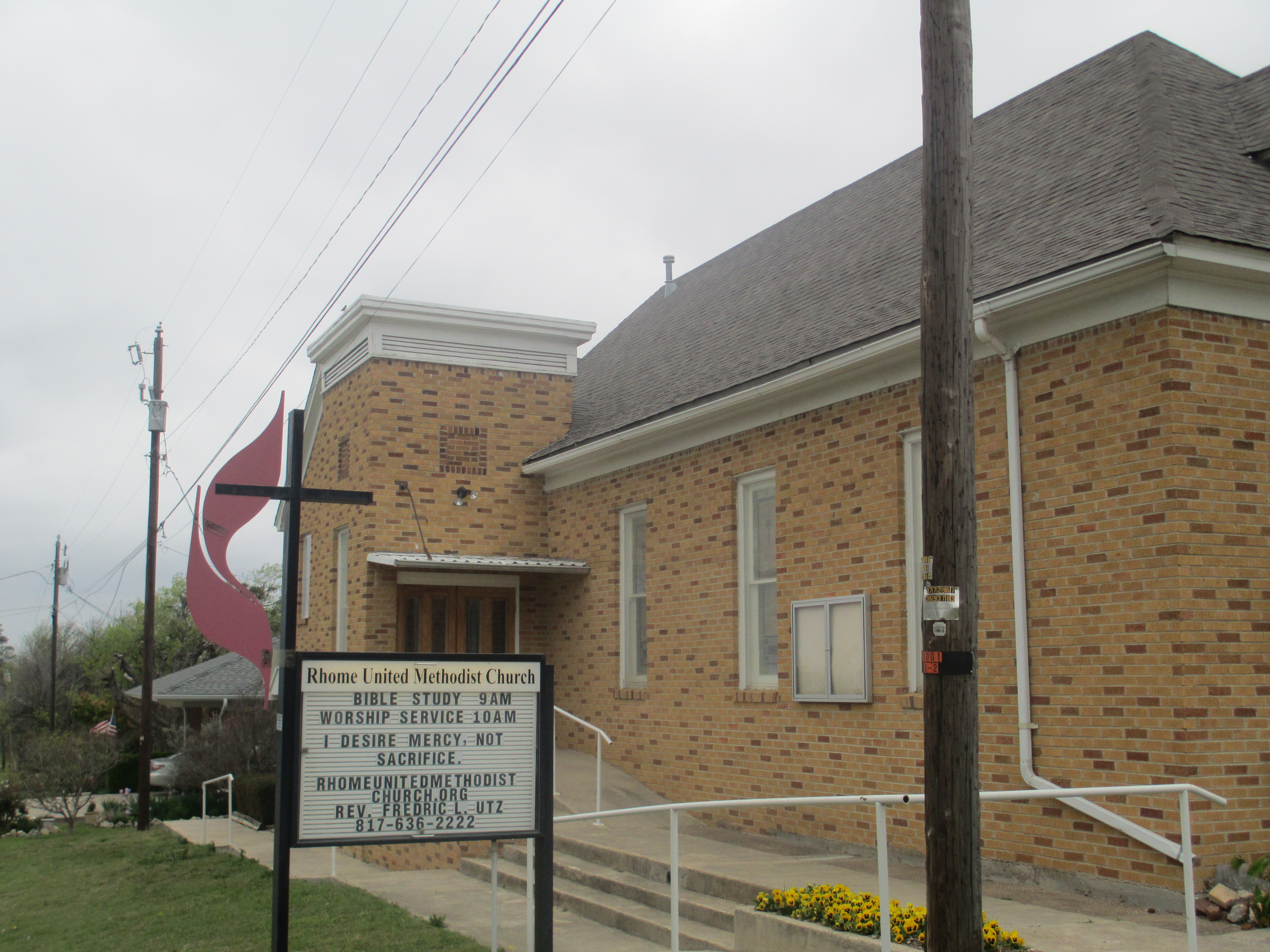
Rhome United Methodist Church is located near the city hall downtown.

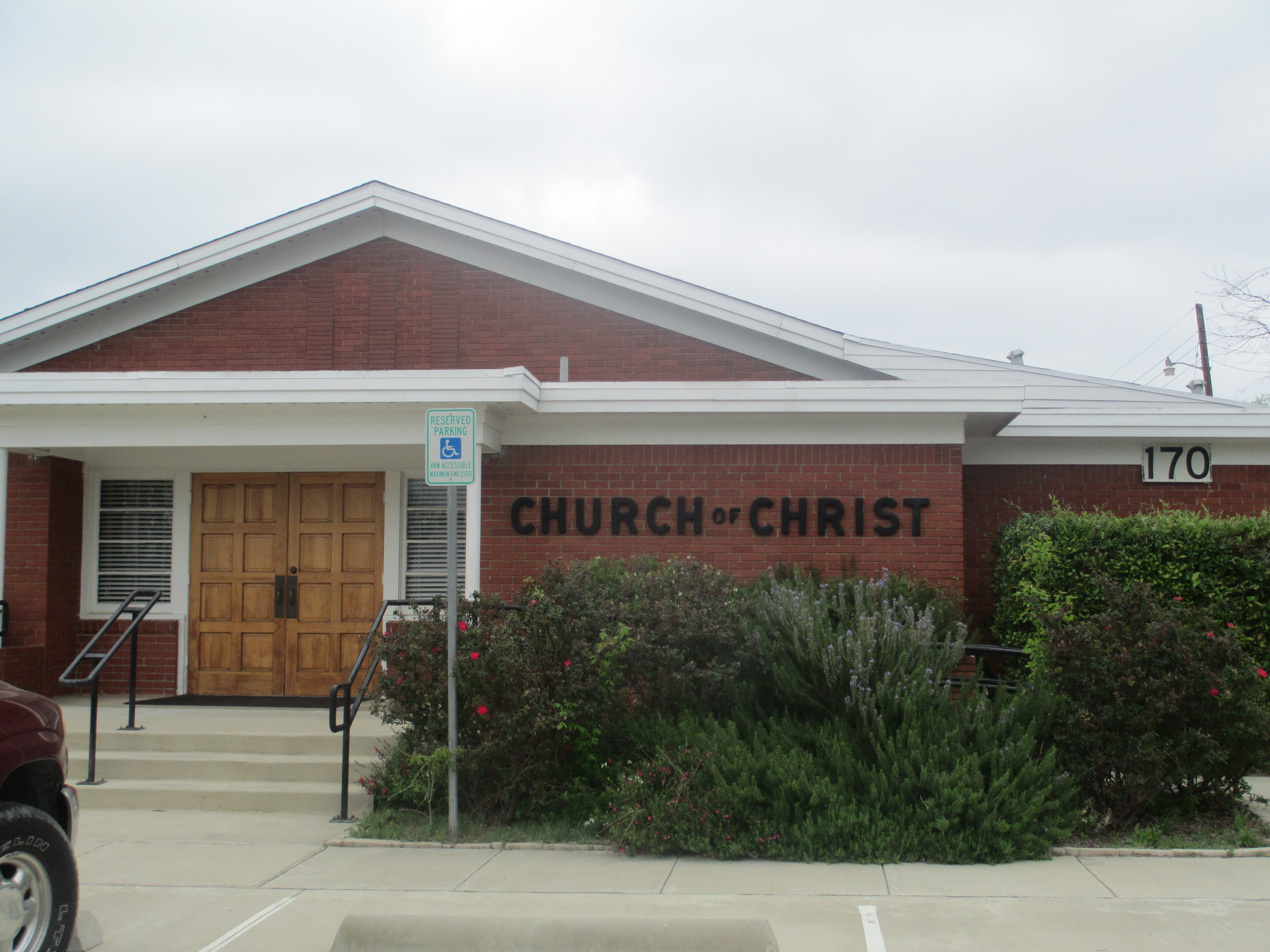
Church of Christ building in Rhome
