= Farm to Market Road 230 =

Highway in Texas, United States

Farm to Market Road 230

Route information
- Maintained by TxDOT
- Length: 29.688 mi (47.778 km)
- Existed: 1945–present

Major junctions
- North end: FM 1280 in Lovelady
- East end: SH 19 in Trinity

Location
- Country: United States
- State: Texas
- Counties: Houston, Walker, Trinity

Highway system
- Highways in Texas; Interstate; US; State; Former; Toll; Loops; Spurs; FM/RM; Park; Rec
← FM 229	→ FM 231

Farm to Market Road 230 (FM 230) is a farm to market road in Houston, Walker, and Trinity Counties in Texas.

== Route description ==
FM 230 begins at an intersection with FM 1280 in Lovelady, one block from that route's intersection with SH 19. The road travels to the southwest through unincorporated Houston County before it reaches the Texas Department of Criminal Justice's Eastham Unit, located at the Houston–Walker county line. After passing the prison, FM 230 turns to the east and briefly enters Walker County before crossing into Trinity County. The road then enters Trinity along Main Street, reaching its eastern terminus at SH 19.

As the route was designated as a west–east route, reference markers increase from Lovelady to Trinity. However, the segment from Lovelady to the Eastham Unit is now signed south–north, while the segment from the Eastham Unit to Trinity is signed west–east.

== History ==
FM 230 was designated on June 8, 1945; the original route began at what was then SH 45 (now SH 19) in Lovelady and traveled 3.5 miles (5.6 km) westward. The route was extended 9.2 miles (14.8 km) to past Weldon on November 23, 1948 and then 2.7 miles (4.3 km) to the Eastham Unit on April 21, 1954. On November 24, 1959, FM 230 was extended east 5.4 miles (8.7 km). On September 27, 1960, the road was extended east to the Trinity County line. The eastward extension to Trinity occurred on October 14, 1960, replacing FM 287.

== Major intersections ==
County	Location	mi	km	Destinations	Notes
Houston	Lovelady	0.0	0.0	FM 1280 – Austonio, Groveton	Northern terminus
Houston		6.2	10.0	FM 3151 – Pearson Chapel	
Houston		7.5	12.1	FM 2915	
Houston		15.3	24.6	TDCJ Eastham Unit	
Walker		19.2	30.9	FM 3478 – TDCJ Ellis/Estelle Units	
Trinity	Trinity	29.7	47.8	SH 19 – Lovelady, Huntsville	Eastern terminus
1.000 mi = 1.609 km; 1.000 km = 0.621 mi
