= List of Farm to Market Roads in Texas (3100–3199) =

- Texas Farm to Market Road and Ranch to Market Road markers

Highway names
- Interstates: Interstate Highway X (IH-X, I-X)
- US Highways: U.S. Highway X (US X)
- State: State Highway X (SH X)
- Loops: Loop X
- Spurs: Spur X
- Recreational: Recreational Road X (RE X)
- Farm or Ranch to Market Roads: Farm to Market Road X (FM X); Ranch to Market Road X (RM X)
- Park Roads: Park Road X (PR X)

System links
- Highways in Texas; Interstate; US; State; Former; Toll; Loops; Spurs; FM/RM; Park; Rec

Farm to Market Roads in Texas are owned and maintained by the Texas Department of Transportation (TxDOT).

== FM 3100 ==
Farm to Market Road 3100
- Location: Brown County
- Length: 8.881 mi (14.293 km)
- Existed: 1967–present

Farm to Market Road 3100 (FM 3100) is located in Brown County. The road begins at FM 1467 northeast of Owens, and continues south until meeting with US 377 in Early. FM 3100 was designated on June 2, 1967, from US 67 north 4.1 miles (6.6 km) to a road intersection at Salt Creek Church. On August 29, 1989, FM 3100 was extended north 3 miles (4.8 km) to a county road. On October 29, 1992, it was extended north to FM 1467.

== FM 3101 ==
Farm to Market Road 3101
- Location: Eastland County
- Length: 7.094 mi (11.417 km)
- Existed: 1967–present

== FM 3102 ==
Farm to Market Road 3102
- Location: Cottle County
- Length: 7.191 mi (11.573 km)
- Existed: 1967–present

== FM 3103 ==
Farm to Market Road 3103
- Location: Foard County
- Length: 4.454 mi (7.168 km)
- Existed: 1967–present

== FM 3104 ==
Farm to Market Road 3104
- Location: Wheeler County
- Length: 5.262 mi (8.468 km)
- Existed: 1967–present

== FM 3105 ==
Farm to Market Road 3105
- Location: Hopkins County
- Length: 3.847 mi (6.191 km)
- Existed: 1967–present

== FM 3106 ==
Farm to Market Road 3106
- Location: Pecos County
- Length: 3.8 mi (6.1 km)
- Existed: October 28, 1999–present

=== FM 3106 (1967) ===
Farm to Market Road 3106
- Location: Erath County
- Existed: June 2, 1967–December 20, 1984

A previous route numbered FM 3106 was designated on June 2, 1967, from US 77 at Bluff Dale south 4.8 miles (7.7 km) to Richardson Creek. On September 5, 1973, the road was extended south 2.3 miles (3.7 km) to FM 2157 (now FM 205). By district request, FM 3106 was cancelled on December 20, 1984, and transferred to FM 2481.

== FM 3107 ==
Farm to Market Road 3107
- Location: Parker County
- Length: 4.25 mi (6.84 km)
- Existed: 1967–present

== FM 3108 ==
Farm to Market Road 3108
- Location: Cooke County
- Length: 3.172 mi (5.105 km)
- Existed: 1967–present

== FM 3109 ==
Farm to Market Road 3109
- Location: Young County
- Length: 8.975 mi (14.444 km)
- Existed: 1967–present

== FM 3110 ==
Farm to Market Road 3110
- Location: Dallam County
- Length: 13.547 mi (21.802 km)
- Existed: 1967–present

== FM 3111 ==
Farm to Market Road 3111
- Location: Floyd County
- Length: 4.502 mi (7.245 km)
- Existed: 1967–present

== FM 3112 ==
Farm to Market Road 3112
- Location: Lynn County
- Length: 12.989 mi (20.904 km)
- Existed: 1967–present

== FM 3113 ==
Farm to Market Road 3113
- Location: Martin County
- Length: 4.008 mi (6.450 km)
- Existed: 1967–present

== FM 3114 ==
Farm to Market Road 3114
- Location: Ward County
- Existed: June 2, 1967–May 27, 1968

== FM 3115 ==
Farm to Market Road 3115
- Location: Runnels County
- Length: 6.063 mi (9.757 km)
- Existed: 1967–present

== FM 3116 ==
Farm to Market Road 3116
- Location: Jones County
- Length: 9.754 mi (15.698 km)
- Existed: 1967–present

== FM 3117 ==
Farm to Market Road 3117
- Location: Bell County
- Length: 5.969 mi (9.606 km)
- Existed: 1967–present

== FM 3118 ==
Farm to Market Road 3118
- Location: Bosque County
- Length: 1.467 mi (2.361 km)
- Existed: 1967–present

== FM 3119 ==
Farm to Market Road 3119
- Location: Limestone County
- Length: 3.823 mi (6.153 km)
- Existed: 1967–present

== FM 3120 ==
Farm to Market Road 3120
- Location: Denton County
- Length: 2.9 mi (4.7 km)
- Existed: January 30, 1986–present

=== FM 3120 (1967) ===
Farm to Market Road 3120
- Location: Jefferson County
- Existed: June 1, 1967–June 9, 1983

A previous route numbered FM 3120 was designated on June 1, 1967, from FM 364, 0.8 miles (1.3 km) south of SH 105, north and northwest 3.2 miles (5.1 km) to Willis Lane and Tram Road. On October 15, 1976, a 0.5-mile (0.80 km) section from SH 105 south was transferred to FM 364. The remainder of FM 3120 was also transferred to FM 364 on June 9, 1983.

== FM 3121 ==
Farm to Market Road 3121
- Location: Sabine County
- Length: 4.917 mi (7.913 km)
- Existed: 1967–present

== FM 3122 ==
Farm to Market Road 3122
- Location: Franklin County
- Length: 5.515 mi (8.876 km)
- Existed: 1967–present

== FM 3123 ==
Farm to Market Road 3123
- Location: Angelina County
- Length: 0.76 mi (1,220 m)
- Existed: 1967–present

== FM 3124 ==
Farm to Market Road 3124
- Location: Angelina County
- Length: 2.302 mi (3.705 km)
- Existed: 1967–present

== FM 3125 ==
Farm to Market Road 3125
- Location: Bailey County
- Length: 8.138 mi (13.097 km)
- Existed: July 9, 1970–present

Farm to Market Road 3125 (FM 3125) is located in Bailey County. Its western terminus is at the New Mexico state line, where it intersects NM 348. It runs eastward approximately 8 miles (13 km) to FM 1731.

FM 3125 was designated on July 9, 1970, on the current route as a replacement of a section of FM 1760, which was rerouted on a different road further south.

=== FM 3125 (1967) ===
Farm to Market Road 3125
- Location: Newton County
- Existed: August 31, 1967–February 17, 1969

A previous route numbered FM 3125 was designated in Newton County on August 31, 1967, from FM 692 west and southwest 4.6 miles (7.4 km) to a proposed road intersection. On July 11, 1968, the road was extended southwest 6.7 miles (10.8 km) to SH 87. FM 3125 was cancelled on February 17, 1969, and became a portion of FM 255 (now RE 255).

== FM 3126 ==
Farm to Market Road 3126
- Location: Polk County
- Length: 11.366 mi (18.292 km)
- Existed: 1967–present

== FM 3127 ==
Farm to Market Road 3127
- Location: San Augustine County
- Length: 1.562 mi (2.514 km)
- Existed: 1967–present

== FM 3128 ==
Farm to Market Road 3128
- Location: San Jacinto County
- Length: 3.573 mi (5.750 km)
- Existed: 1967–present

== FM 3129 ==
Farm to Market Road 3129
- Location: Cass County
- Length: 19.32 mi (31.09 km)
- Existed: 1967–present

== RM 3130 ==
Ranch to Market Road 3130
- Location: Sutton County
- Length: 24.923 mi (40.110 km)
- Existed: 1968–present

== FM 3131 ==
Farm to Market Road 3131
- Location: Jackson County
- Length: 12.525 mi (20.157 km)
- Existed: 1968–present

== FM 3132 ==
Farm to Market Road 3132
- Location: Delta County
- Length: 2.696 mi (4.339 km)
- Existed: 1968–present

== FM 3133 ==
Farm to Market Road 3133
- Location: Grayson and Collin counties
- Length: 8.814 mi (14.185 km)
- Existed: 1968–present

Farm to Market Road 3133 (FM 3133) is located in Grayson and Collin counties.

FM 3133 begins at an intersection with SH 5 in Van Alstyne. The highway travels in an eastern and southward direction through rural farming areas, ending at an intersection with FM 2862 in Westminster.

FM 3133 was designated on July 11, 1968, traveling from SH 5 southeastward to the Collin County line at a distance of 4.4 miles (7.1 km). The highway was extended, replacing all of FM 3093 to FM 2862 on May 7, 1974.

== FM 3134 ==
Farm to Market Road 3134
- Location: Hopkins County
- Length: 5.32 mi (8.56 km)
- Existed: 1968–present

== FM 3135 ==
Farm to Market Road 3135
- Location: Rusk County
- Length: 6.537 mi (10.520 km)
- Existed: 1968–present

== FM 3136 ==
Farm to Market Road 3136
- Location: Johnson County
- Length: 10.372 mi (16.692 km)
- Existed: 1968–present

== RM 3137 ==
Ranch to Market Road 3137
- Location: Palo Pinto County
- Length: 7.403 mi (11.914 km)
- Existed: 1968–present

== FM 3138 ==
Farm to Market Road 3138
- Location: Hartley County
- Length: 7.001 mi (11.267 km)
- Existed: 1968–present

== FM 3139 ==
Farm to Market Road 3139
- Location: Hartley County
- Length: 0.745 mi (1,199 m)
- Existed: 1968–present

== FM 3140 ==
Farm to Market Road 3140
- Location: Parmer County
- Length: 3.847 mi (6.191 km)
- Existed: 1968–present

== FM 3141 ==
Farm to Market Road 3141
- Location: Swisher County
- Length: 5.822 mi (9.370 km)
- Existed: 1968–present

== FM 3142 ==
Farm to Market Road 3142
- Location: Willacy County
- Length: 3.233 mi (5.203 km)
- Existed: May 31, 1973–present

=== FM 3142 (1968) ===
Farm to Market Road 3142
- Location: Menard County
- Existed: July 11, 1968–November 3, 1972

A previous route numbered FM 3142 was designated on July 11, 1968, from US 83, 6 miles (9.7 km) north of Menard, to a point 8.0 miles (12.9 km) northwest. FM 3142 was cancelled on November 3, 1972, and became a portion of FM 1223, although the route remained signed as FM 3142 until construction was completed.

== FM 3143 ==
Farm to Market Road 3143
- Location: Gray, Donley, and Collingsworth counties
- Length: 21.934 mi (35.299 km)
- Existed: 1968–present

Farm to Market Road 3143 runs from Bus. I-40-H (former Loop 555, US 66), southeastward approximately 21.8 miles (35.1 km) to FM 1547, 3.0 miles (4.8 km) west of Dozier.

=== FM Spur 3143 ===
Farm to Market Road 3143 Spur
- Location: Gray County
- Length: 0.300 mi (483 m)
- Existed: December 13, 1990–present

FM Spur 3143 is located in Gray County. Its eastern terminus is at FM 3143 (South Main Street), and its western terminus at the frontage road of I-40.

=== FM 3143 (1968) ===
Farm to Market Road 3143
- Location: Borden County
- Existed: July 11, 1968–by September 1968

The original FM 3143 was designated on July 11, 1968, to run from FM 1235 in View, southeast 4.2 miles (6.8 km). This route became part of FM 1235 when the route of this road was corrected.

== FM 3144 ==
Farm to Market Road 3144
- Location: Falls County
- Length: 0.813 mi (1,308 m)
- Existed: 1968–present

== FM 3145 ==
Farm to Market Road 3145
- Location: Falls County
- Length: 1.162 mi (1.870 km)
- Existed: 1968–present

== FM 3146 ==
Farm to Market Road 3146 (FM 3146) is a designation that has been applied to two different highways. No highway presently carries the FM 3146 designation.

=== FM 3146 (1968) ===
Farm to Market Road 3146
- Location: Hamilton County
- Existed: July 11, 1968–October 1968

FM 3146 was first designated on July 11, 1968, from FM 221 at Shive southwest to a road intersection, replacing FM Spur 221. This was cancelled three months later, with the section that was previously FM Spur 221 changed back to it and the remainder completely cancelled.

=== FM 3146 (1970) ===
Farm to Market Road 3146
- Location: Callahan County
- Existed: May 7, 1970–March 15, 1990

FM 3146 was designated on May 7, 1970, from SH 36 southward, eastward, and southward 4 miles (6.4 km). On November 3, 1972, FM 3146 was extended south to FM 2287. FM 3146 was cancelled on March 15, 1990 and transferred to FM 2287.

== FM 3147 ==
Farm to Market Road 3147
- Location: Hill County
- Length: 1.564 mi (2.517 km)
- Existed: 1968–present

== FM 3148 ==
Farm to Market Road 3148
- Location: McLennan County
- Length: 5.686 mi (9.151 km)
- Existed: 1968–present

== FM 3149 ==
Farm to Market Road 3149
- Location: McLennan County
- Length: 7.952 mi (12.798 km)
- Existed: 1968–present

== FM 3150 ==
Farm to Market Road 3150
- Location: Angelina County
- Length: 1.75 mi (2.82 km)
- Existed: 1968–present

== FM 3151 ==
Farm to Market Road 3151
- Location: Houston County
- Length: 4.589 mi (7.385 km)
- Existed: 1968–present

Farm to Market Road 3151 (FM 3151) is located in southwestern Houston County.

FM 3151 begins at FM 230 between Weldon and Lovelady. The two-lane, 4.6-mile (7.4 km) road travels northward before terminating in Pearson's Chapel at FM 1280 between Austonio and Lovelady.

FM 3151 was designated along its current alignment on July 11, 1968.

== FM 3152 ==
Farm to Market Road 3152
- Location: Polk County
- Length: 6.587 mi (10.601 km)
- Existed: 1968–present

== FM 3153 ==
Farm to Market Road 3153
- Location: San Augustine County
- Length: 2.766 mi (4.451 km)
- Existed: 1968–present

== FM 3154 ==
Farm to Market Road 3154
- Location: Trinity County
- Length: 9.576 mi (15.411 km)
- Existed: 1968–present

== FM 3155 ==
Farm to Market Road 3155
- Location: Fort Bend County
- Length: 1.02 mi (1.64 km)
- Existed: 1968–present

Farm to Market Road 3155 (FM 3155) is located in Fort Bend County. The highway begins at U.S. Route 90 Alternate in Richmond and follows streets north and northwest before ending at the Richmond State Supported Living Center.

FM 3155 begins at the junction of US 90 Alt. and Collins Road in Richmond. The Oak Bend Medical Center is on the south side of the intersection. FM 3155 heads northwest on Collins Road, crossing the Union Pacific Railroad tracks. At Preston Street, FM 3155 turns sharply west for a few blocks then curves to the northwest. At a distance of 1 mile (1.6 km) from the starting point, state highway maintenance ends on the campus of the Richmond State Supported Living Center. FM 3155 was designated on July 11, 1968, to start at US 90 Alt. and go northwest about 1 mile (1.6 km).

== FM 3156 ==
Farm to Market Road 3156
- Location: Matagorda County
- Length: 5.499 mi (8.850 km)
- Existed: 1968–present

Farm to Market Road 3156 (FM 3156) is located in Matagorda County.

FM 3156 was designated on July 11, 1968, to run from SH 60, 2.2 miles (3.5 km) north of SH 35, northeastward about 5.2 miles (8.4 km) to a road intersection. At that point, it becomes County Road 112 and continues to FM 1728 at Ashwood.

== FM 3157 ==
Farm to Market Road 3157
- Location: DeWitt County
- Length: 5.426 mi (8.732 km)
- Existed: 1968–present

== FM 3158 ==
Farm to Market Road 3158
- Location: Caldwell County
- Length: 6.506 mi (10.470 km)
- Existed: 1968–present

== FM 3159 ==
Farm to Market Road 3159
- Location: Comal County
- Length: 6.358 mi (10.232 km)
- Existed: July 11, 1968–present

Farm to Market Road 3159 (FM 3159) is located in Comal County.

FM 3159 begins at an intersection with SH 46/Smithson Valley Road east of Bulverde. The highway travels in a northeast direction, entering Canyon Lake at an intersection with FM 311. FM 3159 travels through more rural areas of the CDP, with the route becoming more suburban north of Cranes Mill Road. The highway continues to travel through more suburban and commercial areas, ending at an intersection with FM 2673 in the Startzville area of Canyon Lake.

FM 3159 was designated on July 11, 1968, running from FM 2673 at Startzville, southwestward at a distance of 2.1 miles (3.4 km). The highway was extended 3.3 miles (5.3 km) southwestward to FM 311 on November 26, 1969. FM 3159 was extended 1.0 mile (1.6 km) to SH 46 on May 7, 1970.

== RM 3160 ==
Ranch to Market Road 3160
- Location: Kendall County
- Existed: July 11, 1968–May 25, 1993

Ranch to Market Road 3160 (RM 3160) was located in Kendall County.

RM 3160 was designated on July 11, 1968, traveling from RM 473 at Kendalia southwestward at 6.7 miles (10.8 km). The highway was extended 3.0 miles (4.8 km) southward on May 7, 1970. RM 3160 was extended 2.7 miles (4.3 km) southward to RM 475 (now SH 46) at Bergheim on November 3, 1972. The highway was extended 3.7 miles (6.0 km) southwestward to the Comal County line on September 29, 1977; this section was later cancelled on November 19, 1979. RM 3160 was cancelled on May 25, 1993, with the mileage being transferred to FM 3351.

== FM 3161 ==
Farm to Market Road 3161
- Location: Wilson County
- Length: 4.292 mi (6.907 km)
- Existed: 1968–present

Farm to Market Road 3161 (FM 3161) is located in Wilson County.

FM 3161 begins at an intersection with FM 2505. The highway travels in a northeast direction, running in a more northern direction at County Road 134. FM 3161 continues to run in a mostly northern direction, ending at an intersection with SH 97 southeast of Floresville.

FM 3161 was designated on August 5, 1968, along its current route, with the mileage being transferred from FM 2505.

== FM 3162 ==
Farm to Market Road 3162
- Location: Live Oak County
- Length: 12.9 mi (20.8 km)
- Existed: 1968–present

== FM 3163 ==
Farm to Market Road 3163
- Location: Denton County
- Length: 2.695 mi (4.337 km)
- Existed: 1968–present

== FM 3164 ==
Farm to Market Road 3164
- Location: Cooke County
- Length: 5.314 mi (8.552 km)
- Existed: November 5, 1971–present

=== FM 3164 (1968) ===
Farm to Market Road 3164
- Location: Navarro County
- Existed: July 11, 1968–September 16, 1971

A previous route numbered FM 3164 was designated on July 11, 1968, from FM 55 southwest 4.2 miles (6.8 km) to Wolf Creek Park at Navarro Mill Reservoir. FM 3164 was cancelled on September 16, 1971, and became a portion of FM 639.

== FM 3165 ==
Farm to Market Road 3165
- Location: Bowie County
- Length: 2.32 mi (3.73 km)
- Existed: 1968–present

== RM 3166 ==
Ranch to Market Road 3166
- Location: Terrell County
- Length: 3.015 mi (4.852 km)
- Existed: 1969–present

Ranch to Market Road 3166 (RM 3166) is located in Terrell County. Its western terminus is at SH 349, approximately 28 miles (45 km) north of Dryden. The route travels east for 3 miles (5 km) before state maintenance ends.

RM 3166 was established on November 26, 1969, along its current route.

=== FM 3166 (1968) ===
Farm to Market Road 3166
- Location: Marion County
- Existed: July 11, 1968–October 1968

A previous route, called Farm to Market Road 3166 (FM 3166), was designated on July 11, 1968, to run from US 259 0.8 miles (1.3 km) southeast of Jenkins southeast to FM 250. This route was cancelled 90 days later.

== FM 3167 ==
Farm to Market Road 3167
- Location: Starr County
- Length: 14.019 mi (22.561 km)
- Existed: 1968–present

== FM 3168 ==
Farm to Market Road 3168
- Location: Willacy County
- Length: 1.561 mi (2.512 km)
- Existed: 1968–present

== FM 3169 ==
Farm to Market Road 3169
- Location: Zapata County
- Length: 17.731 mi (28.535 km)
- Existed: 1968–present

Farm to Market Road 3169 (FM 3169) is located in Zapata County.

The western terminus of FM 3169 is in San Ygnacio at US 83. The route travels through rural Zapata County. The state designation and maintenance of the road ends approximately 17 miles (27 km) northeast of San Ygnacio.

FM 3169 was designated on July 11, 1968, with a length of approximately 5.0 mi (8.0 km). FM 3169 was extended east 3.0 mi (4.8 km) on May 7, 1970, northeast 4.0 mi (6.4 km) on November 5, 1971, northeast 4.5 mi (7.2 km) on November 3, 1972, and 1.2 mi (1.9 km) on May 25, 1976. A 6.5-mile (10.5 km) extension designated on April 30, 1987, has not yet been constructed.

== FM 3170 ==
Farm to Market Road 3170
- Location: Lampasas County
- Length: 3.59 mi (5.78 km)
- Existed: 1968–present

== FM 3171 ==
Farm to Market Road 3171
- Location: Fayette County
- Length: 4.542 mi (7.310 km)
- Existed: 1968–present

== FM 3172 ==
Farm to Market Road 3172
- Location: Shelby County
- Length: 7.008 mi (11.278 km)
- Existed: 1968–present

== FM 3173 ==
Farm to Market Road 3173
- Location: San Augustine County
- Length: 4.214 mi (6.782 km)
- Existed: 1968–present

== FM 3174 ==
Farm to Market Road 3174
- Location: Shelby County
- Length: 1.427 mi (2.297 km)
- Existed: 1968–present

== FM 3175 ==
Farm to Market Road 3175
- Location: Atascosa County
- Length: 8.457 mi (13.610 km)
- Existed: November 26, 1969–present

Farm to Market Road 3175 (FM M) is a 8.457-mile (13.610 km) state road in Atascosa County, that connects Benton City Road (at a point roughly 1,600 feet [490 m] north of Interstate 35) in Lytle with Farm to Market Road 476 (southwest of Somerset).

== FM 3176 ==
Farm to Market Road 3176
- Location: Medina and Frio counties
- Length: 6.225 mi (10.018 km)
- Existed: 1969–present

== FM 3177 ==
Farm to Market Road 3177
- Location: Travis County
- Length: 4.755 mi (7.652 km)
- Existed: 1969–present

Farm to Market Road 3177 (FM 3177) is a 4.8-mile (7.7 km) divided roadway located in Travis County. It begins at FM 969 in Austin, heading northeast on Decker Lane, a four-lane divided highway. It passes the Travis County Exposition Center which contains Luedecke Arena, to the east, and runs to the west of Lake Walter E. Long. FM 3177 crosses a Capital Metropolitan Transportation Authority line and reaches its northern terminus at an intersection with US 290.

FM 3177 was designated on November 26, 1969, along the current route. On June 27, 1995, the entire route was redesignated Urban Road 3177 (UR 3177). The designation reverted to FM 3177 with the elimination of the Urban Road system on November 15, 2018. In 2015, FM 3177's northern terminus was rerouted westward to instead intersect US 290 at the southern terminus of Harris Branch Parkway.

== FM 3178 ==
Farm to Market Road 3178
- Location: Leon County
- Length: 5.142 mi (8.275 km)
- Existed: 1970–present

== FM 3179 ==
Farm to Market Road 3179
- Location: Walker County
- Length: 4.585 mi (7.379 km)
- Existed: 1969–present

== FM 3180 ==
Farm to Market Road 3180
- Location: Chambers County
- Length: 4.058 mi (6.531 km)
- Existed: 1969–present

== FM 3181 ==
Farm to Market Road 3181
- Location: Childress County
- Length: 1.993 mi (3.207 km)
- Existed: 1969–present

== FM 3182 ==
Farm to Market Road 3182
- Location: Wheeler County
- Length: 6.021 mi (9.690 km)
- Existed: 1969–present

== FM 3183 ==
Farm to Market Road 3183
- Location: Hale County
- Length: 2.071 mi (3.333 km)
- Existed: 1969–present

== FM 3184 ==
Farm to Market Road 3184
- Location: Shelby County
- Length: 3.747 mi (6.030 km)
- Existed: January 28, 1975–present

=== FM 3184 (1969) ===
Farm to Market Road 3184
- Location: Matagorda County
- Existed: November 26, 1969–September 13, 1974

A previous route numbered FM 3184 was designated on November 26, 1969, from the Wharton County line south 5.0 miles (8.0 km) to FM 1468 near Clemville. FM 3184 was cancelled on September 13, 1974, and became a portion of FM 1162.

== FM 3185 ==
Farm to Market Road 3185
- Location: San Augustine County
- Length: 1.4 mi (2.3 km)
- Existed: 1969–present

== FM 3186 ==
Farm to Market Road 3186
- Location: Polk County
- Length: 2.187 mi (3.520 km)
- Existed: 1969–present

== FM 3187 ==
Farm to Market Road 3187
- Location: Houston County
- Length: 4.382 mi (7.052 km)
- Existed: 1969–present

== FM 3188 ==
Farm to Market Road 3188
- Location: Trinity County
- Length: 4.799 mi (7.723 km)
- Existed: 1969–present

== FM 3189 ==
Farm to Market Road 3189
- Location: Williamson County
- Length: 3.8 mi (6.1 km)
- Existed: May 7, 1970–May 24, 1985

Farm to Market Road 3189 (FM 3189) was located in Williamson County.

FM 3189 was designated on May 7, 1970, running from FM 487 3.0 miles (4.8 km) east of Florence, northeastward to the Bell County line at a distance of 3.8 miles (6.1 km). The highway was cancelled on May 24, 1985, with the mileage being transferred to FM 2843.

== FM 3190 ==
Farm to Market Road 3190
- Location: Live Oak and Bee counties
- Length: 1.57 mi (2.53 km)
- Existed: 1970–present

== FM 3191 ==
Farm to Market Road 3191
- Location: Karnes County
- Length: 3.198 mi (5.147 km)
- Existed: 1970–present

== FM 3192 ==
Farm to Market Road 3192
- Location: Live Oak County
- Length: 6.117 mi (9.844 km)
- Existed: 1970–present

== FM 3193 ==
Farm to Market Road 3193
- Location: Collin County
- Existed: May 7, 1970–June 25, 1991

== FM 3194 ==
Farm to Market Road 3194
- Location: Navarro County
- Length: 5.446 mi (8.764 km)
- Existed: 1970–present

== FM 3195 ==
Farm to Market Road 3195
- Location: Cameron County
- Length: 1.705 mi (2.744 km)
- Existed: 1970–present

Farm to Market Road 3195 (FM 3195) is located in Cameron County.

FM 3195 begins at a junction with I-2/US 83 in western Harlingen. The highway travels in a northern direction along Stuart Place Road through suburban areas of the city. Near the Stuart Place Country Club, FM 3195 enters Palm Valley, then ends at an intersection with FM 2994.

FM 3195 was designated on May 7, 1970, along its current route. The route was redesignated Urban Road 3195 (UR 3195) on June 27, 1995. The designation reverted to FM 3195 with the elimination of the Urban Road system on November 15, 2018.

== FM 3196 ==
Farm to Market Road 3196
- Location: Duval County
- Length: 14.884 mi (23.953 km)
- Existed: 1970–present

== FM 3197 ==
Farm to Market Road 3197
- Location: Collingsworth County
- Length: 1.0 mi (1.6 km)
- Existed: March 1, 1972–present

=== FM 3197 (1970) ===
Farm to Market Road 3197
- Location: Hidalgo County
- Existed: May 7, 1970–November 5, 1971

A previous route numbered FM 3197 was designated on May 7, 1970, from a point north of FM 2812 south 5.0 miles (8.0 km) to FM 1925, 1.3 miles (2.1 km) east of FM 907. FM 3197 was cancelled on November 5, 1971, and removed from the highway system in exchange for creation of FM 3250.

== FM 3198 ==
Farm to Market Road 3198
- Location: Cherokee County
- Length: 1.521 mi (2.448 km)
- Existed: March 1, 1972–present

Farm to Market Road 3198 (FM 3198) is located in Cherokee County. It runs about 1.5 miles (2.4 km) from east of the dam at Lake Palestine, east and then northeast, to an intersection with FM 855.

FM 3198 was designated on March 1, 1972, along the current route.

=== FM 3198 (1970) ===
Farm to Market Road 3198
- Location: Willacy County
- Existed: May 7, 1970–November 5, 1971

A previous route numbered FM 3198 was designated on May 7, 1970, from FM 1762 southward to SH 186, a distance of 1.5 miles (2.4 km). The highway was cancelled and removed from the state highway system on November 5, 1971, in exchange for the creation of FM 3251 (now FM 1425).

== FM 3199 ==
Farm to Market Road 3199
- Location: Kinney County
- Length: 6.752 mi (10.866 km)
- Existed: 1970–present
