= Red Bluff Creek =

Red Bluff Creek may refer to:

- Red Bluff Creek (Satilla River tributary), a stream in Georgia
- Red Bluff Creek (Medina River tributary), a stream in Texas
