= List of Farm to Market Roads in Texas (1200–1299) =

- Texas Farm to Market Road and Ranch to Market Road markers

Highway names
- Interstates: Interstate Highway X (IH-X, I-X)
- US Highways: U.S. Highway X (US X)
- State: State Highway X (SH X)
- Loops: Loop X
- Spurs: Spur X
- Recreational: Recreational Road X (RE X)
- Farm or Ranch to Market Roads: Farm to Market Road X (FM X); Ranch to Market Road X (RM X)
- Park Roads: Park Road X (PR X)

System links
- Highways in Texas; Interstate; US; State; Former; Toll; Loops; Spurs; FM/RM; Park; Rec

Farm to Market Roads in Texas are owned and maintained by the Texas Department of Transportation (TxDOT).

== FM 1200 ==
Farm to Market Road 1200
- Location: Cooke County
- Length: 6.947 mi (11.180 km)
- Existed: July 14, 1949–present

Farm to Market Road 1200 (FM 1200) is located in Cooke County.

FM 1200 begins at FM 1201 in western Gainesville near Gainesville Municipal Airport. The highway travels northwest before state maintenance ends south of South Fish Creek. The roadway continues as County Road 460 towards Marysville.

FM 1200 was designated on July 14, 1949, running from US 82 west of Gainesville northwestward at a distance of 5.0 miles (8.0 km). The section between US 82 and FM 1201 was transferred to the latter route on February 6, 1953. FM 1200 was extended 3.4 miles (5.5 km) northwestward on July 11, 1968.

== FM 1201 ==
Farm to Market Road 1201
- Location: Cooke County
- Length: 15.917 mi (25.616 km)
- Existed: 1949–present

Farm to Market Road 1201 (FM 1201) is located in Cooke County.

FM 1201 begins at an intersection with US 82 in western Gainesville. The highway travels in a north-northwest direction near the eastern border of Gainesville Municipal Airport and intersects FM 1200 before leaving the city limits. After leaving Gainesville, FM 1201 travels through rural areas until reaching the Moss Lake area. From here, FM 1201 runs closely to the Red River and travels through Sivells Bend. The highway ends just north of Sivells Bend, with state maintenance ending south of County Road 406; the roadway continues north as County Road 403.

FM 1201 was designated on July 14, 1949, running from FM 1200 northward at a distance of 4 miles (6.4 km). On February 6, 1953, the highway was extended to US 82 (absorbing the southernmost 1.5 miles (2.4 km) of FM 1200) and was extended 6.7 miles (10.8 km) northwest; FM 1201 was extended to Sivells Bend later that year on October 28. A spur route, FM Spur 1201, was designated on March 2, 1967, along the highway's old location near Moss Lake.

Junction list

The entire route is in Cooke County.

Location	mi	km	Destinations	Notes
Gainesville	0.0	0.0	US 82 – Wichita Falls, Gainesville	
Gainesville	1.2	1.9	FM 1200 north – Marysville	
	3.6	5.8	FM 1202 east to I-35	
	10.9	17.5	FM Spur 1201 south	
	15.9	25.6	County Road 403	
1.000 mi = 1.609 km; 1.000 km = 0.621 mi

== FM 1202 ==
Farm to Market Road 1202
- Location: Cooke County
- Length: 2.843 mi (4.575 km)
- Existed: 1949–present

Farm to Market Road 1202 (FM 1202) is located in Cooke County.

FM 1202 begins at an intersection with FM 1201. The highway travels in a northeast direction then turns southeast at Lake Lane before turning east at County Road 444. FM 1202 enters Gainesville before ending at I-35 near an outlet center.

FM 1202 was designated on July 14, 1949, along the current route.

== FM 1203 ==
Farm to Market Road 1203
- Location: Live Oak County
- Length: 5.676 mi (9.135 km)
- Existed: October 31, 1958–present

Farm to Market Road 1203 (FM 1203) is located in Live Oak County.

FM 1203 begins at an intersection with the northbound frontage road of I-37 south of Oakville. The highway travels in a northeastern direction, turns east, then turns southeast near a county road. FM 1203 continues to run in a southeastern direction before ending at an intersection with FM 799.

The current FM 1203 was designated on October 31, 1958, running from SH 9 (now I-37) near Oakville, eastward and southeastward to FM 799.

=== FM 1203 (1949) ===
Farm to Market Road 1203
- Location: Cooke County
- Existed: July 14, 1949–October 18, 1954

FM 1203 was originally designated on July 14, 1949, running from US 82 east of Gainesville to Callisburg at a distance of 4.0 miles (6.4 km). The highway was extended to 1.0 mile (1.6 km) south of Sturgeon on February 6, 1953, absorbing FM 1629, while the old route became a spur of FM 1203. FM 1203 was cancelled on October 18, 1954, and became a portion of FM 678.

== FM 1204 ==
Farm to Market Road 1204
- Location: Wise County
- Length: 5.449 mi (8.769 km)
- Existed: June 25, 1952–present

Farm to Market Road 1204 (FM 1204) is located in Wise County.

FM 1204 begins at the intersection of County Roads 2646 and 2745. The highway travels in a southeastern direction and turns to the southwest at Greenwood then turns back southeast at Greenwood Road. FM 1204 continues to run southeast before ending at an intersection with FM 51 northeast of Decatur.

The current FM 1204 was designated on June 25, 1952, along the current route. The highway follows a former routing of FM 455. A portion was FM 1657.

=== FM 1204 (1949) ===
Farm to Market Road 1204
- Location: Throckmorton County
- Existed: July 14, 1949–January 3, 1952

A previous route numbered FM 1204 was designated on July 14, 1949, running from SH 6 at Woodson eastward at a distance of 3.0 miles (4.8 km). FM 1204 was cancelled on January 3, 1952, and transferred to FM 209.

== FM 1205 ==
Farm to Market Road 1205
- Location: Borden and Howard counties
- Length: 18.966 mi (30.523 km)
- Existed: July 28, 1953–present

=== FM 1205 (1949) ===
Farm to Market Road 1205
- Location: Wichita County
- Existed: July 14, 1949–February 6, 1953

A previous route numbered FM 1205 was designated on July 14, 1949, from US 287 at Iowa Park south 2 miles (3.2 km) to FM 367. On May 23, 1951, the road was extended 13.3 miles (21.4 km) east and north to SH 240. FM 1205 was cancelled on February 6, 1953, and transferred to FM 368.

== FM 1206 ==
Farm to Market Road 1206
- Location: Wichita County
- Length: 7.966 mi (12.820 km)
- Existed: 1949–present

== FM 1207 ==
Farm to Market Road 1207
- Location: Wilbarger County
- Length: 4.946 mi (7.960 km)
- Existed: 1949–present

== FM 1208 ==
Farm to Market Road 1208
- Location: Midland County
- Length: 5.051 mi (8.129 km)
- Existed: September 21, 1955–present

=== FM 1208 (1949) ===
Farm to Market Road 1208
- Location: Wilbarger County
- Existed: July 14, 1949–July 28, 1955

A previous route numbered FM 1208 was designated on July 14, 1949, from US 283 near Beaver Creek east 3.1 miles (5.0 km) to a road intersection. FM 1208 was cancelled on July 28, 1955, and transferred to FM 1763.

== FM 1209 ==
Farm to Market Road 1209
- Location: Bastrop County
- Length: 4.57 mi (7.35 km)
- Existed: March 26, 1958–present

Many of Elon Musk's companies have relocated their corporate headquarters to sites along FM 1209.

=== FM 1209 (1949) ===
Farm to Market Road 1209
- Location: Crane County
- Existed: July 14, 1949–September 28, 1950

A previous route numbered FM 1209 was designated on July 14, 1949, from SH 51, 5.1 miles (8.2 km) north of Crane, south and east 5.8 miles (9.3 km) to SH 51, 2.5 miles (4.0 km) north of Crane. FM 1209 was cancelled on September 28, 1950, in exchange for creation of FM 1601.

== FM 1210 ==
Farm to Market Road 1210
- Location: Dawson and Borden counties
- Length: 14.108 mi (22.705 km)
- Existed: July 25, 1951–present

=== FM 1210 (1949) ===
Farm to Market Road 1210
- Location: Ector County
- Existed: July 14, 1949–February 28, 1951

A previous route numbered FM 1210 was designated on July 14, 1949, from US 80 at Badger south and east 7.0 miles (11.3 km) to a paved county road. FM 1210 was cancelled on February 28, 1951, and removed from the highway system.

== FM 1211 ==
Farm to Market Road 1211
- Location: Loving and Winkler counties
- Existed: July 14, 1949–August 29, 1990

Farm to Market Road 1211 (FM 1211) was located in Loving and Winkler counties. No highway currently uses the FM 1211 designation.

FM 1211 was designated on July 14, 1949, from SH 276 (now SH 302) at Mentone to a point 2.0 miles (3.2 km) northeast. On December 17, 1952, the road was extended northeast 14.8 miles (23.8 km) to the Winkler County line. That same day the road was extended northeast 14.0 miles (22.5 km) to SH 115 1 mile (1.6 km) west of Wink. On December 1, 1953, the road was signed (but not designated) as part of SH 302. FM 1211 was cancelled on August 29, 1990, as the SH 302 designation became official.

== FM 1212 ==
Farm to Market Road 1212
- Location: Martin County
- Length: 18.72 mi (30.13 km)
- Existed: 1949–present

== FM 1213 ==
Farm to Market Road 1213
- Location: Midland County
- Length: 7.964 mi (12.817 km)
- Existed: 1949–present

== FM 1214 ==
Farm to Market Road 1214
- Location: Henderson County
- Length: 1.192 mi (1.918 km)
- Existed: January 22, 1958–present

Farm to Market Road 1214 (FM 1214) is located in Henderson County in Caney City.

FM 1214 begins at Barron Road north of Wingham Road. The highway travels in a predominately northern direction before turning east at Thomas Drive. FM 1214 travels near the shore of Cedar Creek Reservoir before ending at an intersection with SH 198.

The current FM 1214 was designated on January 22, 1958, running from FM 316 (now SH 198) to St. Paul's School.

=== FM 1214 (1949) ===
Farm to Market Road 1214
- Location: Pecos and Brewster counties
- Existed: July 14, 1949–November 24, 1956

FM 1214 was originally designated on July 14, 1949, running from Spur 194 in Fort Stockton southward at a distance of 5.0 miles (8.0 km). The highway was extended 13.5 miles (21.7 km) southward on December 17, 1952. FM 1214 was extended to US 90 near Marathon on September 29, 1954. The highway was cancelled and redesignated as SH 51 (now US 385) on November 24, 1956, as TxDOT proposed a U.S. Highway on this corridor.

== FM 1215 ==
Farm to Market Road 1215
- Location: Reeves County
- Length: 4.39 mi (Note: The certified length given is shorter than the actual mileage, as the Texas Department of Transportation description of FM 1215 considers it to be discontinuous at rather than concurrent with SH 17.) (7.07 km)
- Existed: 1949–present

Farm to Market Road 1215 (FM 1215) is located in southwestern Reeves County. It begins along the north frontage road of I-10. The two-lane road proceeds first to the north, then makes turns to the east and north into Saragosa, where it is known as West Main Street, before making one more eastward turn to SH 17. FM 1215 runs south concurrently with SH 17 for 0.5 miles (0.80 km) before turning east at CR 306, following that road for 1 mile (1.6 km) before ending at an intersection with CR 309. CR 306 continues an additional mile to FM 2448.

FM 1215 was designated along its present route on July 14, 1949.

Junction list

The entire route is in Reeves County.

Location	mi	km	Destinations	Notes
	0	0.0	I-10 north frontage road	Western terminus
Saragosa	3.4	5.5	SH 17 north – Pecos	Northern end of SH 17 overlap
	3.9	6.3	SH 17 south – Balmorhea, Fort Davis	Southern end of SH 17 overlap
	4.9	7.9	CR 306 / CR 309	Eastern terminus; roadway continues east as CR 306 one mile to FM 2448
1.000 mi = 1.609 km; 1.000 km = 0.621 mi: Concurrency terminus

== FM 1216 ==
Farm to Market Road 1216
- Location: Reeves County
- Length: 10.093 mi (16.243 km)
- Existed: 1949–present

Farm to Market Road 1216 (FM 1216) is located in northeastern Reeves County, and connects US 285 in Pecos northward to the location of a former school. The road intersects FM 3398.

FM 1216 begins at US 285 on the northern edge of Pecos. The two-lane road proceeds to the north 3 miles (4.8 km) to FM 3398. The road continues an additional 7.1 miles (11.4 km) before state maintenance ends. The roadway continues to the northeast as Reeves County Road 425, which ends at SH 302. The path of FM 1216 is roughly parallel to the Pecos River to the east.

FM 1216 was designated in on July 14, 1949, along approximately 6.0 miles (9.7 km) of its present route beginning at US 285. The route was extended along the remainder of its current length to the site of the former Patrole School on December 18, 1951.

== FM 1217 ==
Farm to Market Road 1217
- Location: Pecos and Terrell counties
- Existed: July 14, 1949–August 29, 1990

Farm to Market Road 1217 (FM 1217) was located in Pecos and Terrell counties. No highway currently uses the FM 1217 designation.

FM 1217 was designated on July 14, 1949, from US 90 in Dryden to a point 5.5 miles north. By April 24, 1954, the road had been extended north and northeast 26.5 miles. On September 29, 1954, the road was extended a final 27.8 miles to US 290 at Sheffield, replacing FM 1749. On December 13, 1956, the road was signed, but not designated, as an extension of SH 349. FM 1217 was cancelled on August 29, 1990, as the SH 349 designation became official.

== FM 1218 ==
Farm to Market Road 1218
- Location: Winkler and Andrews counties
- Length: 13.171 mi (21.197 km)
- Existed: December 18, 1951–present

Farm to Market Road 1218 (FM 1218) is located in Winkler and Andrews counties. It begins in Winkler County at FM 874 northeast of Kermit. It runs to the north, mainly along the New Mexico state line, and enters Andrews County before ending at SH 128.

FM 1218 was designated on December 18, 1951, from FM 874 to the Andrews County line. It was extended to is current northern terminus at FM 781 (now SH 128) on December 17, 1952.

=== FM 1218 (1949) ===
Farm to Market Road 1218
- Location: Upton County
- Existed: July 14, 1949–December 18, 1951

A previous route numbered FM 1218 was designated in Upton County on July 14, 1949, from US 67, 0.5 miles (0.80 km) east of McCamey, north, east, and south 5.1 miles (8.2 km) to another point on US 67, 2 miles (3.2 km) east of McCamey. This route was cancelled on December 18, 1951, and removed from the state highway system.

== FM 1219 ==
Farm to Market Road 1219
- Location: Ward County
- Length: 22.566 mi (36.316 km)
- Existed: 1949–present

== FM 1220 ==
Farm to Market Road 1220
- Location: Tarrant County
- Length: 13.361 mi (21.502 km)
- Existed: 1953–present

Farm to Market Road 1220 (FM 1220) is located in Tarrant County.

FM 1220 begins at an intersection with SH 183 in the Far Greater Northside area of Fort Worth. The highway travels in a northwestern direction along Azle Avenue through a residential area and runs along the northern edge of Sansom Park before entering Lake Worth. In Lake Worth, FM 1220 has a junction with I-820 and turns north onto Boat Club Road near Lake Worth High School. The highway travels in a northern direction near several subdivisions, running between Lake Worth and Marine Creek Reservoir, before reentering Fort Worth near Saginaw. FM 1220 continues to run near several subdivisions in far northwest Fort Worth and turns west north of an intersection with Park Drive, then enters the town of Eagle Mountain. The highway runs through the town and runs close to Eagle Mountain Lake. West of Eagle Mountain, the Boat Club Road designation leaves the highway, with FM 1220's local designation becoming Morris Dido Newark Road. The highway runs in a northwestern direction near the eastern shore of Eagle Mountain Lake with state maintenance ending at Peden Road at the southern boundary of Pecan Acres; Morris Dido Newark Road continues past Peden Road for another 5.3 miles (8.5 km) to FM 718 near Newark.

FM 1220 was designated on December 1, 1953, running from SH 183 in Fort Worth northwestward and northward to a road intersection at a distance of 6.8 miles (10.9 km). The highway was extended 4.0 miles (6.4 km) northwestward on October 13, 1954. FM 1220 was extended 2.4 miles (3.9 km) to its current northern terminus on September 27, 1960. The section between SH 183 and I-820 was redesignated Urban Road 1220 (UR 1220) on June 27, 1995. The designation of this segment reverted to FM 1220 with the elimination of the Urban Road system on November 15, 2018.

Junction list

The entire route is in Tarrant County.

Location	mi	km	Destinations	Notes
Fort Worth	0.0	0.0	SH 183 (Ephriham Avenue)	
Lake Worth	2.7	4.3	I-820 (Jim Wright Freeway)	I-820 exit 10A/10B
Pecan Acres	13.3	21.4	Peden Road	
1.000 mi = 1.609 km; 1.000 km = 0.621 mi

=== FM 1220 (1949) ===
Farm to Market Road 1220
- Location: Winkler County
- Existed: July 14, 1949–February 28, 1951

The first route numbered FM 1220 was designated on July 14, 1949, from SH 115 at Wink southeast 7.8 miles (12.6 km) to a road intersection. FM 1220 was cancelled on February 28, 1951, and removed from the state highway system in exchange for extending FM 874 southwest from SH 82 (now SH 18) to SH 115.

=== FM 1220 (1951) ===
Farm to Market Road 1220
- Location: Brooks County
- Existed: June 21, 1951–June 23, 1953

The second route numbered FM 1220 was designated on June 21, 1951, from US 281 in Falfurrias east and north to SH 285. This route was cancelled on June 23, 1953, but was restored on December 2, 1953, as FM 2191.

== RM 1221 ==
Ranch to Market Road 1221
- Location: Kimble and Menard counties
- Length: 13.198 mi (21.240 km)
- Existed: July 14, 1949 (Note: RM 1221 was originally designated as FM 1221 from 1949 to 1959.)–present

Ranch to Market Road 1221 (RM 1221) is located in eastern Kimble and Menard counties. It is approximately 13.2 miles (21.2 km) in length. The route's southern terminus is at a junction with US 377 northeast of London. RM 1221 travels due north to an intersection with RM 1773 before curving slightly to the northeast. It ends at a junction with SH 29 in Hext.

The route was designated as Farm to Market Road 1221 on July 14, 1949, along the current route. It was redesignated RM 1221 on November 13, 1959.

Junction list

County	Location	mi	km	Destinations	Notes
Kimble		0.0	0.0	US 377 – Junction, Mason	Southern terminus
Menard		4.3	6.9	RM 1773	
Menard	Hext	13.2	21.2	SH 29 – Menard, Mason	Northern terminus
1.000 mi = 1.609 km; 1.000 km = 0.621 mi

== RM 1222 ==
Ranch to Market Road 1222
- Location: Mason County
- Length: 21.581 mi (34.731 km)
- Existed: July 14, 1949 (Note: RM 1222 was originally designated as FM 1222 from 1949 to 1956.)–present

Ranch to Market Road 1222 (RM 1222) is located in Mason County. It runs from SH 29 near Mason north and east to RM 386 near Fredonia.

The route was designated on July 14, 1949, as Farm to Market Road 1222 (FM 1222), running from US 87 at Camp Air east 10.8 miles (17.4 km) via Katemcy to FM 386 (now RM 386). It was redesignated RM 1222 on October 1, 1956. On May 24, 1962, the road was extended west and south 10.3 miles (16.6 km) to SH 29, 11 miles (18 km) northwest of Mason, replacing RM 1282.

== FM 1223 ==
Farm to Market Road 1223
- Location: Tom Green County
- Length: 19.851 mi (31.947 km)
- Existed: 1949–present

Farm to Market Road 1223 (FM 1223) is located in Tom Green County.

State maintenance for FM 1223 begins on Susan Peak Road south of the main entrance to Rocking Chair Ranch. The highway travels northwest through rural farm and ranch land and has a junction with US 87/Loop 306 west of Wall. After the junction with US 87/Loop 306, FM 1223 continues to run in a northwest direction and enters San Angelo near an intersection with FM 765. The highway turns west at Old Eola Road near Goodfellow Air Force Base, turns northwest at Loop 378, then turns north near the South Concho River. After crossing the river, FM 1233 travels in a northern direction and closely parallels the river before ending at an intersection with FM 388. The section of highway within San Angelo is known locally as Chadbourne Street.

FM 1223 was designated on July 14, 1949, running from US 87 (now Cottonseed Road) 3.5 miles (5.6 km) west of Wall, southeastward at a distance of 7.3 miles (11.7 km). The highway was extended 0.8 miles (1.3 km) over the old location of US 87 to the current location of US 87 at Loop 306 on November 1, 1962. The highway was extended 5.0 miles (8.0 km) southeastward on July 11, 1968. FM 1223 was extended over the old location of US 87 between Loop 306 and Loop 378 on February 10, 1972. On November 3, 1972, the highway was extended 23.1 miles (37.2 km) southeastward to US 83 near Menard, absorbing FM 3142. The section of FM 1223 in Menard County was cancelled on January 9, 1984, with part of the old highway being redesignated as FM 3463. The highway was extended 1.7 miles (2.7 km) northwestward from Loop 378 to FM 388 on March 29, 1988, absorbing the northern part of Loop 378. The section of FM 1223 between US 87 and FM 388 was internally redesignated as Urban Road 1223 (UR 1223) on June 27, 1995. The designation of this segment reverted to FM 1223 with the elimination of the Urban Road system on November 15, 2018.

Junction list

The entire route is in Tom Green County.

Location	mi	km	Destinations	Notes
	0.0	0.0	Susan Peak Road	
	13.8	22.2	US 87 / Loop 306 – Eldorado, San Angelo, Eden	Interchange
San Angelo	16.5	26.6	FM 765 west – Eola	
San Angelo	18.0	29.0	Loop 378 south (Christoval Road)	
San Angelo	19.8	31.9	FM 388 (Avenue L)	
1.000 mi = 1.609 km; 1.000 km = 0.621 mi

== FM 1224 ==
Farm to Market Road 1224
- Location: Fisher County
- Length: 11.482 mi (18.478 km)
- Existed: 1949–present

== FM 1225 ==
Farm to Market Road 1225
- Location: Haskell County
- Length: 8.728 mi (14.046 km)
- Existed: 1949–present

== FM 1226 ==
Farm to Market Road 1226
- Location: Jones County
- Length: 25.699 mi (41.359 km)
- Existed: 1949–present

== FM 1227 ==
Farm to Market Road 1227
- Location: Grimes County
- Length: 7.381 mi (11.879 km)
- Existed: February 19, 1952–present

=== FM 1227 (1949) ===
Farm to Market Road 1227
- Location: Jones County
- Existed: July 14, 1949–February 20, 1952

A previous route numbered FM 1227 was designated on July 14, 1949, from US 83, 1 mile (1.6 km) south of Anson, south 10.5 miles (16.9 km) to a road intersection. On May 23, 1951, the road was extended south 1.3 miles (2.1 km) to FM 605. FM 1227 was cancelled on February 20, 1952, and transferred to FM 707.

== FM 1228 ==
Farm to Market Road 1228
- Location: Kent County
- Length: 13.456 mi (21.655 km)
- Existed: 1949–present

== FM 1229 ==
Farm to Market Road 1229
- Location: Mitchell County
- Length: 19.445 mi (31.294 km)
- Existed: 1949–present

== FM 1230 ==
Farm to Market Road 1230
- Location: Nolan County
- Length: 8.076 mi (12.997 km)
- Existed: 1949–present

== FM 1231 ==
Farm to Market Road 1231
- Location: Kent and Scurry counties
- Existed: July 14, 1949–August 29, 1990

Farm to Market Road 1231 (FM 1231) was located in Kent and Scurry counties. No highway currently uses the FM 1231 designation.

FM 1231 was designated on July 14, 1949, from US 84 at Snyder north 8.8 miles (14.2 km) to a road intersection. On June 21, 1951, the road was extended north 7.6 miles (12.2 km) to the Kent County line. Five months later the road was extended to a point 3.0 miles (4.8 km) north of the county line. On April 29, 1952, the road was extended to US 380, 4 miles (6.4 km) west of Clairemont, replacing FM 1741. On February 23, 1956, FM 1231 was signed, but not designated, as SH 208. FM 1231 was cancelled on August 29, 1990, as the extension of the SH 208 designation became official.

== FM 1232 ==
Farm to Market Road 1232
- Location: Winkler County
- Length: 11.768 mi (18.939 km)
- Existed: February 18, 1952–present

=== FM 1232 (1949) ===
Farm to Market Road 1232
- Location: Shackelford County
- Existed: July 14, 1949–January 14, 1952

A previous route numbered FM 1232 was designated on July 14, 1949, from US 283 at Moran north 6.3 miles (10.1 km) to a road intersection. On May 23, 1951, the road was extended 6.0 miles (9.7 km) north and east to the Stephens County line. FM 1232 was cancelled on January 14, 1952, and transferred to FM 576.

== FM 1233 ==
Farm to Market Road 1233
- Location: Crane and Ward counties
- Length: 34.179 mi (55.006 km)
- Existed: December 18, 1951–present

=== FM 1233 (1949) ===
Farm to Market Road 1233
- Location: Taylor and Jones counties
- Existed: July 14, 1949–December 10, 1951

A previous route numbered FM 1233 was designated on July 14, 1949, from SH 351 northeast of Abilene north 1.6 miles (2.6 km) to the Jones County line. On May 23, 1951, the road was extended north 7.6 miles (12.2 km) to Lake Fort Phantom Hill Dam. FM 1233 was cancelled seven months later and became a portion of FM 1082.

== FM 1234 ==
Farm to Market Road 1234
- Location: Panola County
- Length: 0.863 mi (1,389 m)
- Existed: June 28, 1963–present

=== FM 1234 (1949) ===
Farm to Market Road 1234
- Location: Taylor County
- Existed: July 14, 1949–July 31, 1962

A previous route numbered FM 1234 was designated on July 14, 1949, from SH 351 near Abilene south 2.0 miles (3.2 km) to new US 80. FM 1234 was cancelled on July 31, 1962, and removed from the highway system because it was inside Abilene city limits and Loop 322 was planned to extend north to I-20 on parallel road. In 1992, surplus parts of the right-of-way were quitclaimed to Taylor County.

== FM 1235 ==
Farm to Market Road 1235
- Location: Jones and Taylor counties
- Length: 28.87 mi (46.46 km)
- Existed: 1949–present

== FM 1236 ==
Farm to Market Road 1236
- Location: Fort Bend County
- Length: 5.73 mi (9.22 km)
- Existed: October 31, 1958–present

Farm to Market Road 1236 (FM 1236) is located in Fort Bend County. It begins at FM 442 south of Needville and goes northwest and then northeast before ending at SH 36 in Needville.

A two-lane highway for its entire length, FM 1236 begins at a stop sign on FM 442 south of Needville. This location is 3.1 miles (5.0 km) northwest of the San Bernard River bridge on FM 442. From its starting point, the highway heads 2.0 miles (3.2 km) northwest to Needville Four Corners Road. This section of FM 1236, which is also named Bushnell Road, crosses Buffalo Creek. At Needville Four Corners Road, FM 1236 curves to the northeast and goes 2.4 miles (3.9 km) to Altimore Road on the edge of Needville. The highway continues in the same direction through Needville for 1.0 mile (1.6 km) before coming to a traffic signal at FM 360. The portion of FM 1236 within Needville is also called School Street. The section from FM 360 to the end of the highway at the SH 36 traffic light is an additional 0.3 miles (0.5 km). On the other side of SH 36, School Street continues to the northeast and becomes Old Needville Fairchild Road, but is not part of the state highway system.

FM 1236 was redesignated on October 31, 1958, to begin at FM 442 and head northwest then northeast to end at SH 36 in Needville. The 0.3 miles (0.5 km) long former spur connection to SH 36 was transferred to FM 1236 from FM 360.

Junction list

The entire highway is in Fort Bend County.

Location	mi	km	Destinations	Notes
	0.0	0.0	FM 442	Southern terminus of FM 1236
Needville	5.4	8.7	FM 360	Main Street
Needville	5.7	9.2	SH 36 – Rosenberg, West Columbia	Northern terminus of FM 1236
1.000 mi = 1.609 km; 1.000 km = 0.621 mi

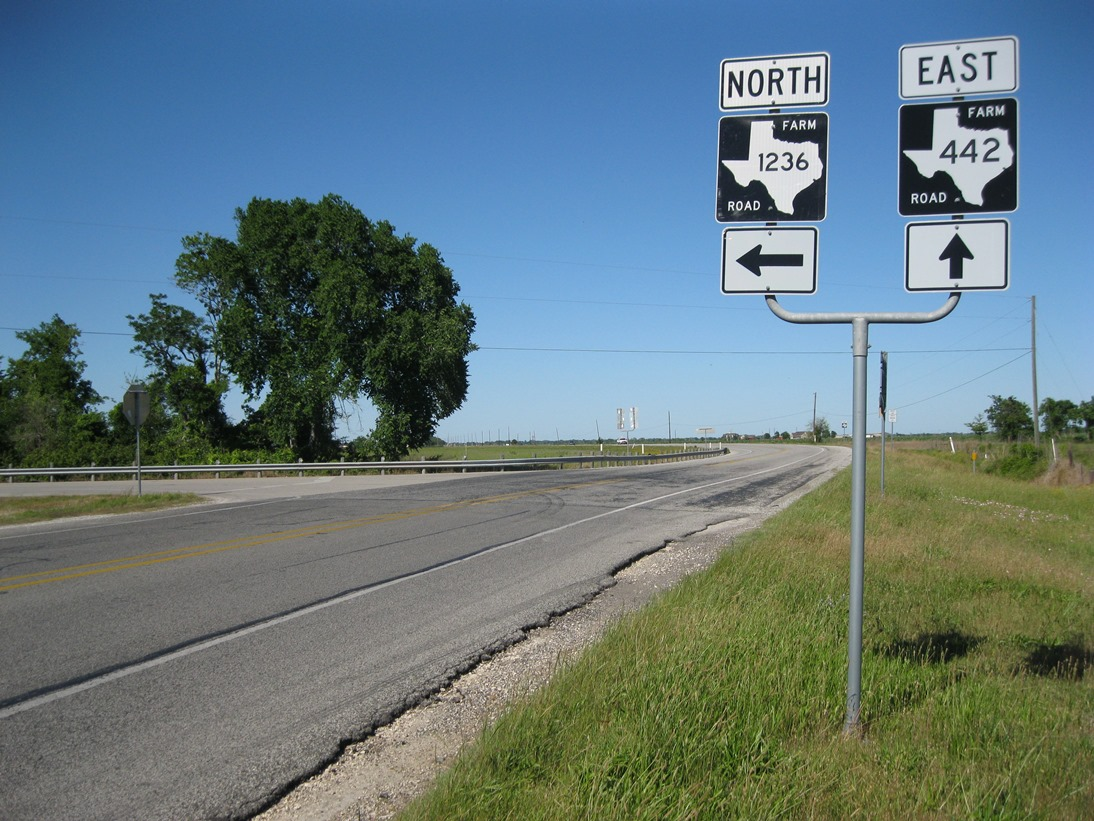
Start of FM 1236 on FM 442 south of Needville

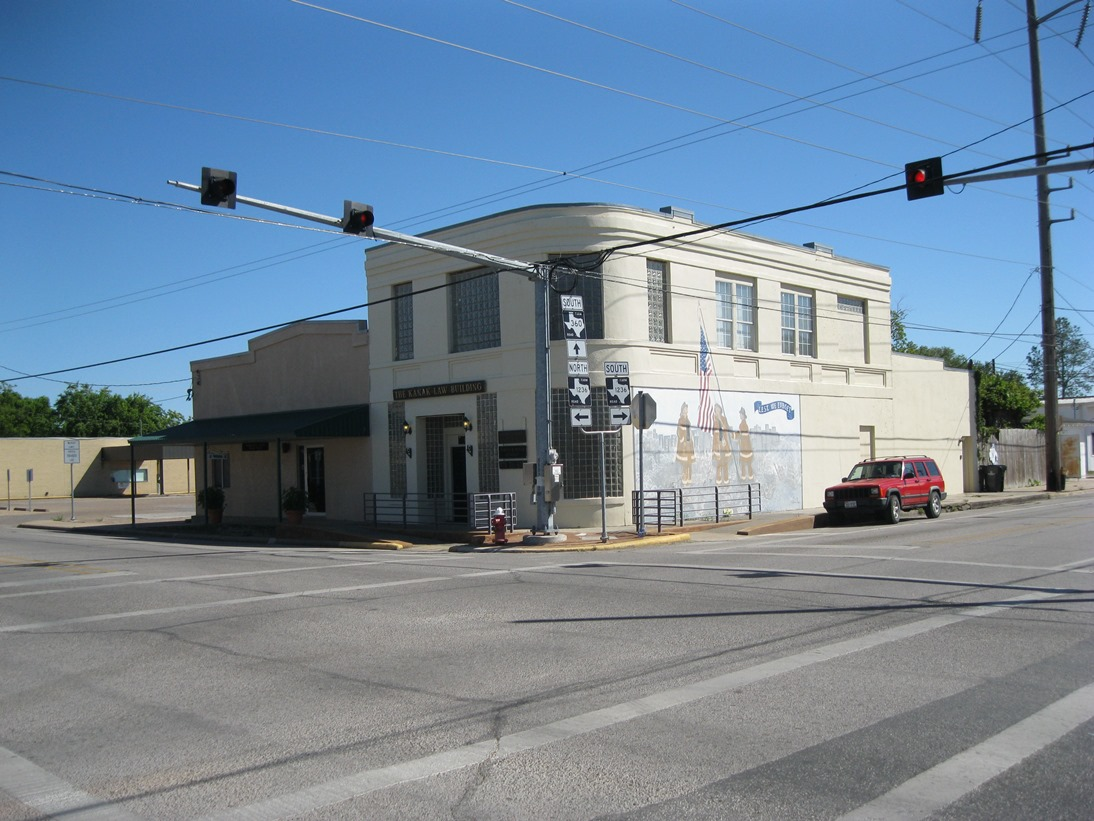
Kanak Law Building at FM 360 and FM 1236 in Needville

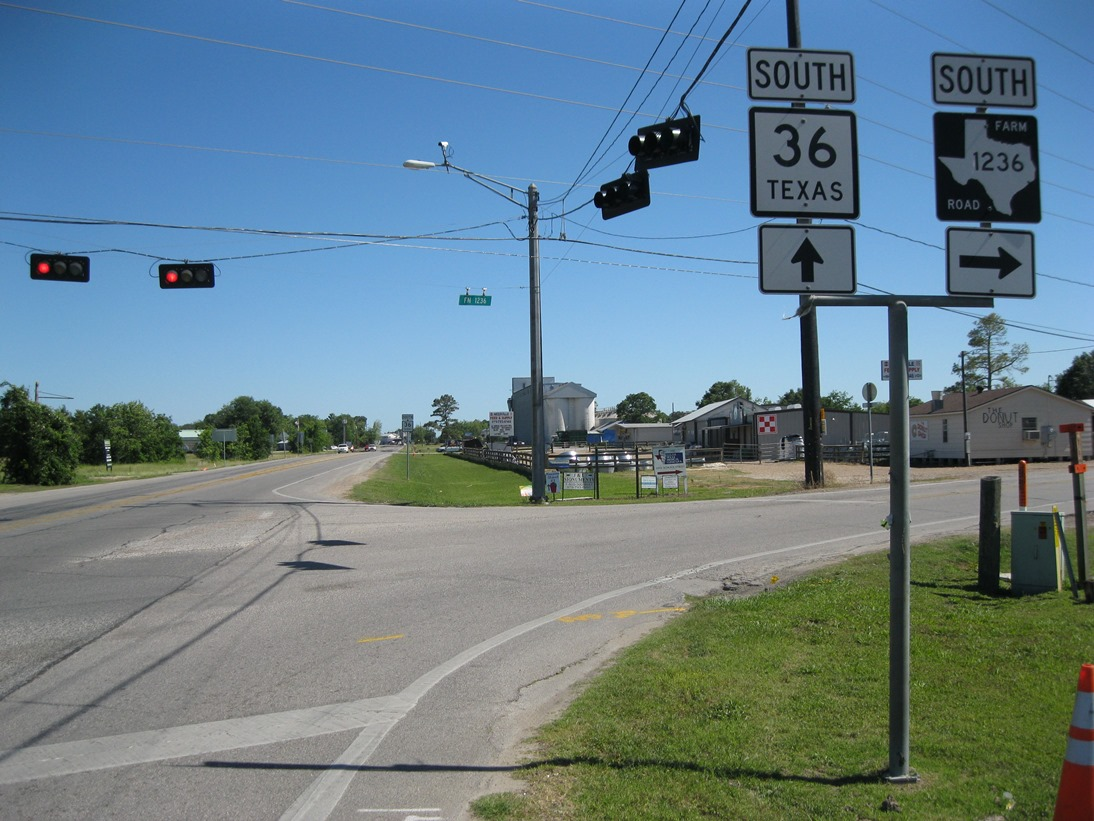
End of FM 1236 at Highway 36 in Needville

=== FM 1236 (1949) ===
Farm to Market Road 1236
- Location: Bell and Williamson counties
- Existed: July 14, 1949–January 7, 1955

FM 1236 was originally designated on July 14, 1949, to start at SH 95 in Bartlett and run about 6.6 miles (10.6 km) to the east. The highway was entirely within Bell County. On December 17, 1952, FM 1236 was extended to the Milam County line, making a total distance of about 9.4 miles (15.1 km). On July 10, 1953, the former right-of-way of FM 1329 was canceled and combined with FM 1236, making a total distance of 36.6 miles (58.9 km). In effect this extended FM 1236 27.2 miles (43.8 km) to the west from Bartlett through Jarrell to SH 195 at Florence in Williamson County. On January 7, 1955, FM 1236 was canceled and its right-of-way was transferred to FM 487.

== FM 1237 ==
Farm to Market Road 1237
- Location: Bell County
- Length: 6.195 mi (9.970 km)
- Existed: 1949–present

== FM 1238 ==
Farm to Market Road 1238
- Location: Bosque and Hamilton counties
- Length: 13.966 mi (22.476 km)
- Existed: 1949–present

== FM 1239 ==
Farm to Market Road 1239
- Location: McLennan and Falls counties
- Length: 7.449 mi (11.988 km)
- Existed: 1949–present

== FM 1240 ==
Farm to Market Road 1240
- Location: Falls County
- Length: 12.852 mi (20.683 km)
- Existed: 1949–present

== FM 1241 ==
Farm to Market Road 1241
- Location: Hamilton and Coryell counties
- Length: 19.946 mi (32.100 km)
- Existed: 1949–present

== FM 1242 ==
Farm to Market Road 1242
- Location: Hill County
- Length: 9.471 mi (15.242 km)
- Existed: 1949–present

== FM 1243 ==
Farm to Market Road 1243
- Location: Hill County
- Length: 10.632 mi (17.111 km)
- Existed: 1949–present

== FM 1244 ==
Farm to Market Road 1244
- Location: Hill County
- Length: 3.654 mi (5.881 km)
- Existed: 1949–present

== FM 1245 ==
Farm to Market Road 1245
- Location: Limestone County
- Length: 20.184 mi (32.483 km)
- Existed: 1949–present

== FM 1246 ==
Farm to Market Road 1246
- Location: Limestone County
- Length: 14.488 mi (23.316 km)
- Existed: 1949–present

== FM 1247 ==
Farm to Market Road 1247
- Location: Cherokee County
- Length: 9.569 mi (15.400 km)
- Existed: 1949–present

== FM 1248 ==
Farm to Market Road 1248
- Location: Cherokee County
- Length: 6.57 mi (10.57 km)
- Existed: 1949–present

== FM 1249 ==
Farm to Market Road 1249
- Location: Gregg and Rusk counties
- Length: 10.036 mi (16.151 km)
- Existed: 1949–present

Farm to Market Road 1249 (FM 1249) runs from US 259 Bus. in Kilgore east to SH 322 near Lakeport.

FM 1249 was designated from US 259 (now Bus. US 259) to SH 322 on July 14, 1949. On January 26, 1965, FM 1249 was extended over the old location of SH 322.

Junction list

County	Location	mi	km	Destinations	Notes
Gregg	Kilgore	0.0	0.0	Bus. US 259 / SH 42 (Henderson Blvd) – White Oak, New London	
Rusk	Kilgore	2.2	3.5	US 259 (Charles K. Devall Memorial Hwy) – Longview, Henderson	Interchange
Rusk		4.9	7.9	FM 2276	
Rusk	Monroe	10.0	16.1	SH 322 – Lakeport, Henderson	
1.000 mi = 1.609 km; 1.000 km = 0.621 mi

== FM 1250 ==
Farm to Market Road 1250
- Location: Medina County
- Length: 2.314 mi (3.724 km)
- Existed: May 5, 1966–present

Farm to Market Road 1250 (FM 1250) is located in Medina County in the town of Hondo and is known locally as 30th Street.

FM 1250 begins at an intersection with US 90 in the western part of the town. The highway travels in an eastern direction until an intersection with Avenue U. East of Avenue U, FM 1250 travels through a residential area before ending at an intersection with FM 462 near Medina Community Hospital.

The current FM 1250 was designated on May 5, 1966, along the current route.

=== FM 1250 (1949) ===
Farm to Market Road 1250
- Location: Henderson County
- Existed: July 14, 1949–October 30, 1961

FM 1250 was first designated on July 14, 1949, from FM 85 near Mabank, eastward to US 175 at a distance of 5.6 miles (9.0 km). The highway was cancelled on October 30, 1961, when FM 85 was rerouted over it.

== FM 1251 ==
Farm to Market Road 1251
- Location: Rusk and Panola counties
- Length: 14.113 mi (22.713 km)
- Existed: 1949–present

== FM 1252 ==
Farm to Market Road 1252
- Location: Smith and Gregg counties
- Length: 17.873 mi (28.764 km)
- Existed: July 14, 1949–present

Farm to Market Road 1252 (FM 1252) is located in Smith and Gregg counties. It runs from FM 757 near its intersection with I-20 east to SH 31 near Kilgore. It is parallel to I-20 for its entire length.

FM 1252 was designated on July 14, 1949, from FM 757 to the Gregg County line. On May 23, 1951, it was extended east to SH 31.

Junction list

County	Location	mi	km	Destinations	Notes
Smith		0.0	0.0	FM 757 to I-20 / US 271	
Gregg	Liberty City	11.7	18.8	SH 135 – Gladewater, Kilgore	
Gregg		12.3	19.8	FM 2207	
Gregg		15.7	25.3	SH 42 – White Oak, Kilgore	
Gregg		17.9	28.8	SH 31 to I-20 / US 259 – Kilgore, Longview	
1.000 mi = 1.609 km; 1.000 km = 0.621 mi

== FM 1253 ==
Farm to Market Road 1253
- Location: Smith County
- Length: 11.787 mi (18.969 km)
- Existed: 1949–present

== FM 1254 ==
Farm to Market Road 1254
- Location: Wood County
- Length: 8.252 mi (13.280 km)
- Existed: 1949–present

== FM 1255 ==
Farm to Market Road 1255
- Location: Van Zandt County
- Length: 18.715 mi (30.119 km)
- Existed: 1949–present

== FM 1256 ==
Farm to Market Road 1256
- Location: Van Zandt County
- Length: 7.954 mi (12.801 km)
- Existed: 1949–present

== FM 1257 ==
Farm to Market Road 1257
- Location: Refugio County
- Length: 1.429 mi (2.300 km)
- Existed: September 26, 1979–present

Farm to Market Road 1257 (FM 1257) is located in Refugio County. From its southern terminus at FM 136 north of the bridge over Copano Bay, it runs northeastward and northward through Bayside to another junction with FM 136.

The current FM 1257 was designated on September 26, 1979, along what is now FM 136 through Bayside. The designations of the two alignments were switched on May 25, 1982.

=== FM 1257 (1949) ===
Farm to Market Road 1257
- Location: Van Zandt County
- Existed: July 14, 1949–September 29, 1949

The first route numbered FM 1257 was designated on July 14, 1949, from US 80 in Edgewood to SH 64 at Canton in Van Zandt County. FM 1257 was cancelled on September 29 of that year and transferred to FM 859.

=== FM 1257 (1951) ===
Farm to Market Road 1257
- Location: Pecos County
- Existed: May 23, 1951–June 30, 1977

The second route numbered FM 1257 was designated on May 23, 1951, from FM 305 northeast 6 miles (9.7 km) to SH 51, 4 miles (6.4 km) northwest of Iraan in Pecos County. FM 1257 was cancelled on June 30, 1977, and redesignated as US 190, effective January 1, 1978.

== FM 1258 ==
Farm to Market Road 1258
- Location: Armstrong, Randall, and Potter counties
- Length: 32.667 mi (52.572 km)
- Existed: 1949–present

== FM 1259 ==
Farm to Market Road 1259
- Location: Deaf Smith County
- Length: 12.981 mi (20.891 km)
- Existed: 1949–present

== FM 1260 ==
Farm to Market Road 1260
- Location: Donley County
- Length: 18.602 mi (29.937 km)
- Existed: July 14, 1949–present

Farm to Market Road 1260 is located in Donley County. It runs from a point 5 miles south of Lelia Lake to an intersection with County Road O.

FM 1260 was designated on July 14, 1949, from US 287, 3 miles southeast of Clarendon, north and east to a road intersection. On March 29, 1956, FM 1260 was extended west, south, and east to a point 5 miles south of Lelia Lake in exchange for the cancelled FM 1754 extension. On July 11, 1968, the section north of US 287 was extended northeast 5 miles.

== FM 1261 ==
Farm to Market Road 1261
- Location: Hansford County
- Length: 22.57 mi (36.32 km)
- Existed: 1949–present

== FM 1262 ==
Farm to Market Road 1262
- Location: Hansford County
- Length: 15.961 mi (25.687 km)
- Existed: 1949–present

== FM 1263 ==
Farm to Market Road 1263
- Location: Stonewall County
- Length: 16.478 mi (26.519 km)
- Existed: August 26, 1953–present

=== FM 1263 (1949) ===
Farm to Market Road 1263
- Location: Hemphill County
- Existed: July 14, 1949–January 27, 1953

The first use of the FM 1263 designation was in Hemphill County, from US 83, 1 mile (1.6 km) north of the Wheeler County line, west 11.8 miles (19.0 km) to a road intersection. FM 1263 was cancelled on January 27, 1953, and transferred to FM 1268.

=== FM 1263 (1952) ===
Farm to Market Road 1263
- Location: Washington County
- Existed: December 17, 1952–May 11, 1953

The next use of the FM 1263 designation was in Washington County, from FM 389 southwest of Brenham southwest 7.5 miles (12.1 km) to the Austin County line (it was numbered on January 27, 1953, or later). FM 1263 was cancelled on May 11, 1953, and transferred to FM 332.

== FM 1264 ==
Farm to Market Road 1264
- Location: Lubbock County
- Length: 15.135 mi (Note: The certified length given is shorter than the actual mileage, as the Texas Department of Transportation description of FM 1264 considers it to be discontinuous at rather than concurrent with FM 1729.) (24.357 km)
- Existed: December 17, 1952–present

Farm to Market Road 1264 (FM 1264) is located in Lubbock County. The section of highway within the city limits of Lubbock is known locally as North University Avenue.

FM 1264 begins at an intersection with U.S. Highway 84 (US 84, Clovis Road) in northwest Lubbock; the road continues past here as University Avenue. The highway travels between the Conquistador and Llano Estacado Lakes and runs near the Lubbock County Juvenile Justice Center before meeting Loop 289. Just north of Loop 289, FM 1264 runs past the Lubbock State School and a subdivision before leaving the city limits of Lubbock. Just north of the Lubbock city limits, the highway intersects FM 2641. FM 1264 continues to its northern terminus at FM 597 west of Abernathy.

The current FM 1264 was designated on December 17, 1952, running from US 84 north to FM 1294. On June 2, 1967, the highway was extended farther north to FM 597. On June 27, 1995, the section of FM 1264 between US 84 and FM 2641 was designated as Urban Road 1264 (UR 1264). The designation of this segment reverted to FM 1264 with the elimination of the Urban Road system on November 15, 2018.

Junction list

The entire route is in Lubbock County.

Location	mi	km	Destinations	Notes
Lubbock	0.0	0.0	North University Avenue – Texas Tech University	Continuation
Lubbock	0.0	0.0	US 84 (Clovis Road)	
Lubbock	1.1	1.8	Loop 289 (North Loop)	
	3.1	5.0	FM 2641 – Lubbock Preston Smith International Airport	
	6.1	9.8	FM 1294 – Shallowater	
	9.1	14.6	FM 1729 east – New Deal	Southern end of FM 1729 overlap
	10.1	16.3	FM 1729 west	Northern end of FM 1729 overlap
	16.2	26.1	FM 597 – Anton, Abernathy	
1.000 mi = 1.609 km; 1.000 km = 0.621 mi: Concurrency terminus

=== FM 1264 (1949) ===
Farm to Market Road 1264
- Location: Hutchinson County
- Existed: July 14, 1949–July 14, 1949

The first FM 1264 was designated on July 14, 1949, from FM 279 (now FM 281) east of SH 117 (now SH 207) northeast to the Roberts County line. This was cancelled quickly and became part of FM 279 and was removed from the designated highway system on May 30, 1950, in exchange for creation of FM 1598.

=== FM 1264 (1949-1951) ===
Farm to Market Road 1264
- Location: El Paso County
- Existed: November 30, 1949–June 21, 1951

The second FM 1264 was designated on November 30, 1949, to run from US 62 north to the El Paso Airport. This route was cancelled on June 21, 1951.

== FM 1265 ==
Farm to Market Road 1265
- Location: Lipscomb County
- Existed: July 14, 1949–August 29, 1990

Farm to Market Road 1265 (FM 1265) was located in Lipscomb County. No highway currently uses the FM 1265 designation.

FM 1265 was designated on July 14, 1949, from the Texas/Oklahoma state line north of Booker south 5.7 miles to a road intersection south of Booker. On October 26, 1954, the road was extended south 12 miles, and south 11.4 miles to US 83 on January 21, 1956. On January 27, 1959, the road was signed, but not designated, as SH 23. FM 1265 was cancelled on August 29, 1990, as the SH 23 designation became official.

== FM 1266 ==
Farm to Market Road 1266
- Location: Galveston County
- Length: 2.011 mi (3.236 km)
- Existed: 1954–present

Farm to Market Road 1266 (FM 1266) is located in Galveston County. It runs from FM 517 in Dickinson north to FM 646 (future SH 99).

FM 1266 was designated in 1954 (authorized February 21, 1952, but road was not numbered until designation) from SH 146 south of Kemah southwest and south 6.3 miles (10.1 km) to FM 517 at Dickinson. On April 1, 1968, the section from SH 146 to new FM 518 was transferred to FM 518. On April 1, 1987, a 1-mile (1.6 km) section from FM 518 north to FM 2094 was added. On June 30, 1995, the entire route was transferred to UR 1266. On May 29, 2003, the sections from FM 518 to SH 96 and SH 96 to FM 646 were removed from the highway system and turned over to League City and a proposed section from FM 2094 to FM 518 was also removed. On November 15, 2018, the route reverted to FM 1266.

=== FM 1266 (1949) ===
Farm to Market Road 1266
- Location: Moore County
- Existed: July 14, 1949–December 7, 1953

A previous route numbered FM 1266 was designated on July 14, 1949, from US 287 at Etter east 10.0 miles (16.1 km) to an intersection with FM 119 at Sunray. The road was extended west 7.2 miles (11.6 km) to a road intersection on May 23, 1951, and another 2.3 miles (3.7 km) west to the Hartley County line on February 21, 1952. FM 1266 was cancelled on December 7, 1953, and transferred to FM 281.

== FM 1267 ==
Farm to Market Road 1267
- Location: Ochiltree County
- Length: 20.143 mi (32.417 km)
- Existed: 1949–present

== FM 1268 ==
Farm to Market Road 1268
- Location: Roberts and Hemphill counties
- Length: 16.986 mi (27.336 km)
- Existed: 1949–present

== FM 1269 ==
Farm to Market Road 1269
- Location: Scurry and Garza counties
- Length: 19.1 mi (30.7 km)
- Existed: December 17, 1952–present

=== FM 1269 (1949) ===
Farm to Market Road 1269
- Location: Sherman County
- Existed: July 14, 1949–September 17, 1952

A previous route numbered FM 1269 was designated on July 14, 1949, from FM 289, 17.6 miles (28.3 km) east of Stratford, north 2.0 miles (3.2 km) to a road intersection. Four months later the road was extended north 10.0 miles (16.1 km) to the Oklahoma state line. FM 1269 was cancelled on September 17, 1952, and transferred to FM 119 (now FM 1290).

== FM 1270 ==
Farm to Market Road 1270
- Location: Angelina County
- Length: 6.038 mi (9.717 km)
- Existed: July 14, 1949–present

Farm to Market Road 1270 (FM 1270) is located in Angelina County. It runs from US 69 south of Zavalla southwestward approximately 6 miles (9.7 km) before state maintenance ends.

FM 1270 was designated on July 14, 1949, from US 69 southwestward 1.9 miles (3.1 km). It was extended to its current length on October 13, 1954.

== FM 1271 ==
Farm to Market Road 1271
- Location: Angelina County
- Length: 3.256 mi (5.240 km)
- Existed: July 14, 1949–present

Farm to Market Road 1271 (FM 1271) is located in Angelina County. It runs from FM 1194 northeastward via Hudson along Old Union Road to a junction with Loop 287 in Lufkin. The roadway continues into central Lufkin as Pershing Avenue.

FM 1271 was designated on July 14, 1949, from SH 94 southwestward 4.9 miles (7.9 km) to Peavy Switch along the Texas South-Eastern Railroad. It was extended southwestward 1.7 miles (2.7 km) on June 2, 1967. On August 13, 1968, the western terminus was moved to its current location, with the old route beyond that point becoming part of an extended FM 1194, and the eastern terminus was moved to Loop 287. On March 31, 1987, the eastern terminus was moved to its current location to provide a more direct connection with Loop 287; the former segment was retained as Spur 72.

== FM 1272 ==
Farm to Market Road 1272
- Location: Houston County
- Length: 7.597 mi (12.226 km)
- Existed: 1949–present

== FM 1273 ==
Farm to Market Road 1273
- Location: Kerr County
- Length: 2.479 mi (3.990 km)
- Existed: December 18, 1951–present

Farm to Market Road 1273 (FM 1273) is located in Kerr County in the Hill Country area. The highway is known locally as Upper Turtle Creek Road.

State maintenance for FM 1273 begins near the intersection of Upper Turtle Creek Road and Pikes Peak Road. The highway snakes its way through hilly terrain and runs parallel to Turtle Creek in an area with several lodges and camps. FM 1273 ends at an intersection with SH 16 southwest of Kerrville.

The current FM 1273 was designated on December 18, 1951 (numbered January 14, 1952), traveling from SH 16 westward to Camp Maddox at a distance of 4.6 miles (7.4 km). The westernmost 2.1 miles (3.4 km) of the highway was turned over to Kerr County for maintenance on June 24, 1953.

=== FM 1273 (1949) ===
Farm to Market Road 1273
- Location: Houston County
- Existed: July 14, 1949–January 14, 1952

A previous route numbered FM 1273 was designated on July 14, 1949, running from SH 45 (now SH 19) at Lovelady to a road intersection at a distance of 3.5 miles (5.6 km). The highway was cancelled and combined with FM 1280 on January 14, 1952.

== FM 1274 ==
Farm to Market Road 1274
- Location: Coleman County
- Length: 2.488 mi (4.004 km)
- Existed: March 2, 1967–present

=== FM 1274 (1949) ===
Farm to Market Road 1274
- Location: Nacogdoches County
- Existed: July 14, 1949–June 18, 1964

A previous route numbered FM 1274 was designated on July 14, 1949, from US 59 near Garrison south 7.9 miles (12.7 km) to a road intersection. On May 23, 1951, a 5.0-mile (8.0 km) section from SH 7 in Martinsville to a road intersection was added, creating a gap. On December 17, 1952, the road was extended south and southwest 6.5 miles (10.5 km) to SH 21 near Chireno, closing the gap and replacing FM 1863. On November 21, 1956, the road was extended south 4.9 miles (7.9 km) from Loop 34 and a break in the route was added at Martinsville. On October 31, 1957, the road was extended south 3.9 miles (6.3 km) to SH 103. FM 1274 was cancelled on June 18, 1964, and transferred to FM 95.

== FM 1275 ==
Farm to Market Road 1275
- Location: Nacogdoches County
- Length: 12.814 mi (20.622 km)
- Existed: July 14, 1949–present

Farm to Market Road 1275 (FM 1275) is a 12.8-mile (20.6 km) route in Nacogdoches County that connects a point along Rayburn Road / Laceyville Road near Dry Creek, approximately 6.7 miles (10.8 km) south of the Nacogdoches city limits, with Loop 224 near the northern edge of Nacogdoches.

Junction list

The entire route is in Nacogdoches County.

Location	mi	km	Destinations	Notes
	0.000	0.000	Rayburn Road / Laceyville Road	Continuation beyond southern terminus
Nacogdoches	7.6	12.2	SH 7 east / SH 21 east / Loop 224 east	Southern end of SH 7 / SH 21 / Loop 224 concurrency
Nacogdoches	7.7	12.4	SH 7 west / SH 21 west / Loop 224 west	Northern end of SH 7 / SH 21 / Loop 224 concurrency
Nacogdoches	9.3	15.0	Bus. SH 7-N / Bus. SH 21-P (Main Street)	
Nacogdoches	10.6	17.1	FM 1878 (East Starr Avenue)	
Nacogdoches	11.6	18.7	FM 2609 (East Austin Street)	
Nacogdoches	12.814	20.622	Loop 224	Northern terminus; T intersection
1.000 mi = 1.609 km; 1.000 km = 0.621 mi: Concurrency terminus

== FM 1276 ==
Farm to Market Road 1276
- Location: Polk County
- Length: 13.522 mi (21.762 km)
- Existed: 1949–present

== FM 1277 ==
Farm to Market Road 1277
- Location: San Augustine County
- Length: 21.329 mi (34.326 km)
- Existed: 1949–present

== FM 1278 ==
Farm to Market Road 1278
- Location: Cottle County
- Length: 7.408 mi (11.922 km)
- Existed: October 28, 1953–present

=== FM 1278 (1949) ===
Farm to Market Road 1278
- Location: Shelby County
- Existed: July 14, 1949–November 13, 1953

A previous route numbered FM 1278 was designated on July 14, 1949, from SH 87 at Hurstown east 6.9 miles (11.1 km) to a road intersection. On September 28, 1950, the road was extended north 2.3 miles (3.7 km) to Strong School. On July 28, 1951, the road was extended 2.5 miles (4.0 km) north to a road intersection. FM 1278 was cancelled on November 13, 1953, and transferred to FM 139.

== FM 1279 ==
Farm to Market Road 1279
- Location: San Augustine and Shelby counties
- Length: 10.707 mi (17.231 km)
- Existed: 1949–present

== FM 1280 ==
Farm to Market Road 1280
- Location: Houston and Trinity counties
- Length: 34.005 mi (54.726 km)
- Existed: 1949–present

Farm to Market Road 1280 (FM 1280) is located in Houston and Trinity counties.

FM 1280 begins in the unincorporated community of Ash in Houston County, at the intersection of County Roads 3190 and 3220. The route proceeds to the east, curving to the southeast to intersect SH 21 in Austonio. It curves back toward the east, passing through the former town of Pearson Chapel, where it intersects FM 3151, before meeting FM 230 and SH 19 in Lovelady. FM 1280 passes Holly before dipping into Trinity County, where it provides access to the communities of Zion Hill and Friday. The route reaches its eastern terminus at a junction with US 287 within the boundaries of the Davy Crockett National Forest shortly thereafter.

FM 1280 was designated on July 14, 1949; the original route was from its eastern terminus near Groveton westward approximately 7.8 miles (12.6 km). It was extended further west to Lovelady on January 14, 1952, replacing FM 1273. On October 13, 1954, FM 1280 was extended 6.3 miles (10.1 km) to Pearsons Chapel. On November 21, 1956, FM 1280 was extended west to Ash, replacing FM 1732.

Junction list

County	Location	mi	km	Destinations	Notes
Houston	Ash	0.0	0.0	CR 3190/CR 3220	Western terminus
Houston	Austonio	3.9	6.3	SH 21 – Madisonville, Crockett	
Houston	Pearson Chapel	10.4	16.7	FM 3151	
Houston	Lovelady	16.8	27.0	FM 230	
Houston	Lovelady	16.9	27.2	SH 19 – Trinity, Crockett	
Houston	Smith Grove	20.6	33.2	FM 1309	
Houston		23.6	38.0	FM 2781 – Pennington	
Trinity	Groveton	34.0	54.7	US 287 – Groveton, Crockett	Eastern terminus
1.000 mi = 1.609 km; 1.000 km = 0.621 mi

== FM 1281 ==
Farm to Market Road 1281
- Location: El Paso County
- Length: 8.179 mi (13.163 km)
- Existed: November 3, 1972 (Note: FM 1281 was originally designated as RM 1281 from 1972 to 1975.)–present

Farm to Market Road 1281 (FM 1281) is located in El Paso County. Its western terminus is at FM 76 in Socorro. FM 1281 runs east, crossing I-10 at exit 37. It then curves northward before turning back eastward and entering Horizon City, where it ends at Ascencion Street. For its entire length, FM 1281 runs along Horizon Boulevard, which continues beyond both termini under local maintenance.

FM 1281 was designated as Ranch to Market Road 1281 (RM 1281) on November 3, 1972, from I-10 to Horizon City. The route's designation was changed to FM 1281 and was extended to FM 76 on November 25, 1975. On May 25, 1993, the FM 1281 designation was extended to Hastings Drive east of Horizon City; however, this extension is not part of the state highway system as of 2023. On June 27, 1995, the extant mileage of the route was transferred to Urban Road 1281 (UR 1281). The designation reverted to FM 1281 with the elimination of the Urban Road system on November 15, 2018.

=== FM 1281 (1949) ===
Farm to Market Road 1281
- Location: Grayson, Fannin, and Hunt counties
- Existed: July 14, 1949–December 17, 1970

A previous route numbered FM 1281 was designated on July 14, 1949, from US 75 at Howe east 8.5 miles (13.7 km) to Tom Bean in Grayson County. On December 17, 1952, the road was extended east 4.6 miles (7.4 km) to US 69. In February 1955, the road was extended east 8.8 miles (14.2 km) to Randolph in Fannin County, replacing FM 2303, and a break in the route was added at US 69. On October 31, 1958, the road was extended east to Bailey. On December 5, 1958, an 8-mile-long (13 km) section from Tom Bean west to Howe was transferred to FM 902, and FM 1281 was instead rerouted northwest to FM 697, replacing FM 2321; it was also extended southeast into Hunt County to Commerce, replacing FM 2320. FM 1281 was cancelled on December 17, 1970, and transferred to SH 11.

== FM 1282 ==
Farm to Market Road 1282
- Location: Childress and Hall counties
- Length: 2.107 mi (3.391 km)
- Existed: May 6, 1964–present

=== FM 1282 (1949) ===
Farm to Market Road 1282
- Location: Grayson County
- Existed: July 14, 1949–January 17, 1958

A previous route numbered FM 1282 was designated on July 14, 1949, from US 82 north 3.0 miles (4.8 km) to Sadler. On October 28, 1953, the road was extended north 3.0 miles (4.8 km) to a road intersection. On October 31, 1957, the road was extended north 5.3 miles (8.5 km) to FM 901 at Gordonville. FM 1282 was cancelled on January 17, 1958, and transferred to FM 901.

=== RM 1282 ===
Ranch to Market Road 1282
- Location: Mason County
- Existed: October 31, 1958–May 24, 1962

Ranch to Market Road 1282 (RM 1282) was designated on October 31, 1958, from SH 29 some 11 miles (18 km) northwest of Mason northeast 4.3 miles (6.9 km) to Ranch Branch School. RM 1282 was cancelled on May 24, 1962, and transferred to RM 1222.

== FM 1283 ==
Farm to Market Road 1283
- Location: Bandera and Medina counties
- Length: 20.871 mi (33.589 km)
- Existed: August 22, 1951–present

Farm to Market Road 1283 (FM 1283) is located in Bandera and Medina counties in the Hill Country. It runs near the eastern shore of Medina Lake.

FM 1283 begins at FM 471 west of San Antonio. The highway runs roughly to the northwest before turning northward at County Road 271, which provides access to Mico. FM 1283 follows the eastern shore of Medina Lake to Lakehills, where it intersects PR 37. The highway then crosses over Red Bluff Creek where it leaves Lakehills and enters Bandera Falls, then runs to the northeast before ending at SH 16 in Pipe Creek.

The current FM 1283 was designated in Bandera County on August 22, 1951, running from SH 16 at Pipe Creek south 3 miles (4.8 km) to a county road. It was extended south to PR 37 on October 31, 1957, and to the Medina County line on May 2, 1962. It was extended to its current terminus at FM 471 on May 7, 1970, replacing RM 1608.

Junction list

County	Location	mi	km	Destinations	Notes
Medina		0.0	0.0	FM 471 – Castroville, San Antonio	
Medina		6.5	10.5	CR 271 (Medina Dam Road) – Mico	
Bandera	Lakehills	11.6	18.7	PR 37 – Medina Lake	
Bandera	Pipe Creek	20.9	33.6	SH 16 – Bandera, San Antonio	
1.000 mi = 1.609 km; 1.000 km = 0.621 mi

=== FM 1283 (1949) ===
Farm to Market Road 1283
- Location: Grayson County
- Existed: July 14, 1949–August 22, 1951

A previous route numbered FM 1283 was designated in Grayson County on July 14, 1949, from US 69 east to the Fannin County line. It was combined with FM 898 on August 22, 1951.

== FM 1284 ==
Farm to Market Road 1284
- Location: Moore County
- Length: 5.178 mi (8.333 km)
- Existed: December 17, 1952–present

=== FM 1284 (1949) ===
Farm to Market Road 1284
- Location: Grayson County
- Existed: July 14, 1949–January 16, 1953

A previous route numbered FM 1284 was designated on July 14, 1949, from SH 10 (now US 377) at Tioga to a point 5 miles (8.0 km) miles east. FM 1284 was cancelled on January 16, 1953, and transferred to FM 121.

== FM 1285 ==
Farm to Market Road 1285
- Location: Baylor and Archer counties
- Length: 12.292 mi (19.782 km)
- Existed: 1949–present

== FM 1286 ==
Farm to Market Road 1286
- Location: Baylor County
- Length: 4.525 mi (7.282 km)
- Existed: 1949–present

== FM 1287 ==
Farm to Market Road 1287
- Location: Stephens and Young counties
- Length: 12.756 mi (20.529 km)
- Existed: 1949–present

== FM 1288 ==
Farm to Market Road 1288
- Location: Clay County
- Length: 18.055 mi (Note: The certified length given is shorter than the actual mileage, as the Texas Department of Transportation description of FM 1288 considers it to be discontinuous at FM 174 and US 287.) (29.057 km)
- Existed: 1949–present

Farm to Market Road 1288 (FM 1288) is located in Clay County.

FM 1288 begins north of Newport, at an intersection with SH 59. It travels to the north through the farming areas of southeastern Clay County, through the community of Vashti, to Bellevue and US 287, the main thoroughfare in the region. After a brief concurrency with US 287, the route continues north about 4.5 mi (7.2 km) before state maintenance ends. The roadway continues under county jurisdiction as Worsham Road, which leads to FM 1134.

FM 1288 is a two-lane route for its entire length, except for the section that is concurrent with US 287 in Bellevue.

FM 1288 was first designated in neighboring Montague County on July 14, 1949; the route traveled westward from US 287 near Bowie to the Clay County line. The section from Bellevue to Vashti was originally designated FM 176 until FM 176 was replaced by an extension of FM 174; after the designation of FM 1288 was extended on December 17, 1952, to Vashti and then southward to SH 59, the state effectively swapped the designations of the two segments, eliminating the 90-degree bend in FM 174 and removing FM 1288 from Montague County. On October 31, 1958, FM 1288 was extended north 3.0 miles (4.8 km). On November 24, 1959, FM 1288 was extended north 2.2 miles (3.5 km) to its current terminus.

Junction list

The entire route is in Clay County.

Location	mi	km	Destinations	Notes
	0.0	0.0	SH 59 – Jacksboro, Bowie	Southern terminus
Vashti	7.0	11.3	FM 174 west – Windthorst	South end of FM 174 concurrency
	7.6	12.2	FM 174 east – Bowie	North end of FM 174 concurrency
	11.2	18.0	FM 2321 west (Cray Road)	
Bellevue	13.8	22.2	US 287 south – Bowie	South end of US 287 concurrency
Bellevue	14.2	22.9	US 287 north – Henrietta	North end of US 287 concurrency
	19.0	30.6	Worsham Road	Northern terminus; state maintenance ends
1.000 mi = 1.609 km; 1.000 km = 0.621 mi

== FM 1289 ==
Farm to Market Road 1289
- Location: Calhoun County
- Length: 11.213 mi (18.046 km)
- Existed: 1949–present

== FM 1290 ==
Farm to Market Road 1290
- Location: Sherman County
- Length: 11.868 mi (19.100 km)
- Existed: June 9, 1964–present

Farm to Market Road 1290 (FM 1290) is located in Sherman County. It runs from the Oklahoma state line to SH 15 (former FM 289).

FM 1290 was designated on June 9, 1964, on the current route as a replacement of a section of FM 119.

=== FM 1290 (1949) ===
Farm to Market Road 1290
- Location: Colorado County
- Existed: July 14, 1949–July 29, 1963

A previous route numbered FM 1290 was designated on July 14, 1949, from FM 155 south of Weimar west 4.9 miles (7.9 km) to Oakland. FM 1290 was cancelled on July 29, 1963, and transferred to FM 532.

== FM 1291 ==
Farm to Market Road 1291
- Location: Colorado and Fayette counties
- Length: 30.396 mi (48.918 km)
- Existed: 1949–present

== FM 1292 ==
Farm to Market Road 1292
- Location: Knox County
- Length: 4.673 mi (7.520 km)
- Existed: May 6, 1964–present

=== FM 1292 (1949) ===
Farm to Market Road 1292
- Location: Fayette County
- Existed: July 14, 1949–November 25, 1958

A previous route numbered FM 1292 was designated on July 14, 1949, from US 90 in Schulenburg south 4.2 miles (6.8 km) to the Lavaca County line. FM 1292 was cancelled on November 25, 1958, and transferred to FM 957.

== FM 1293 ==
Farm to Market Road 1293
- Location: Hardin County
- Length: 20.433 mi (32.884 km)
- Existed: December 17, 1952–present

=== FM 1293 (1949) ===
Farm to Market Road 1293
- Location: Fayette County
- Existed: July 14, 1949–January 16, 1953

A previous route numbered FM 1293 was designated on July 14, 1949, from SH 237 at Round Top 2.8 miles (4.5 km) to Quade School. FM 1293 was cancelled on January 16, 1953, and transferred to FM 1457.

== FM 1294 ==
Farm to Market Road 1294
- Location: Hockley and Lubbock counties
- Length: 37.22 mi (Note: The certified length given is shorter than the actual mileage, as the Texas Department of Transportation description of FM 1294 considers it to be discontinuous at rather than concurrent with FM 2130.) (59.90 km)
- Existed: December 17, 1952–present

Farm to Market Road 1294 (FM 1294) is located in Hockley and Lubbock counties.

FM 1294 begins at an intersection with US 385 between Whitharral and Levelland. The highway travels through rural areas of northern Hockley County, intersecting FM 2646 and FM 168 and has an overlap with FM 2130 before entering Lubbock County near FM 2378. FM 1294 intersects US 84 and Loop 388 near Shallowater. The highway runs near the northern boundary of Shallowater along 12th Street and exits the town near Avenue Q and resumes its rural route. FM 1294 intersects FM 2528 and FM 1264 north of Lubbock and has a junction with I-27/US 87 near Lubbock Preston Smith International Airport and briefly travels through northern Lubbock east of I-27/US 87. After leaving Lubbock, the highway travels in an eastern direction before ending at an intersection with FM 1729.

The current FM 1294 was designated on December 17, 1952 (numbered January 16, 1953), running from US 84 (now Loop 388) at Shallowater eastward to US 87 (now signed with I-27) south of Monroe at a distance of 8.8 miles (14.2 km). The highway was extended 20.1 miles (32.3 km) westward to US 385 on October 31, 1958, with 9.0 miles (14.5 km) of this extension coming from FM 2395. The remainder of FM 2395 became part of FM 168 on November 24, 1959. FM 1294 was extended 1.0 mile (1.6 km) east of US 87 on June 28, 1963. FM 1294 was extended to its current eastern terminus at FM 1729 on November 5, 1971.

Junction list

County	Location	mi	km	Destinations	Notes
Hockley		0.0	0.0	US 385 – Littlefield, Levelland	
Hockley		5.3	8.5	FM 2646 south	
Hockley		10.5	16.9	FM 168 – Anton, Smyer	
Hockley		14.5	23.3	FM 2130 south	West end of FM 2130 overlap
Hockley		15.5	24.9	FM 2130 north	East end of FM 2130 overlap
Lubbock		17.0	27.4	FM 2378	
Lubbock		21.1	34.0	US 84 – Littlefield, Lubbock	
Lubbock	Shallowater	21.4	34.4	Loop 388	
Lubbock		25.1	40.4	FM 2528	
Lubbock		29.0	46.7	FM 1264	
Lubbock	Lubbock	31.0	49.9	I-27 / US 87 – Plainview, Amarillo, Lubbock	I-27 exit 11
Lubbock		38.0	61.2	FM 1729 – New Deal, Idalou	
1.000 mi = 1.609 km; 1.000 km = 0.621 mi: Concurrency terminus

=== FM 1294 (1949) ===
Farm to Market Road 1294
- Location: Fayette County
- Existed: July 14, 1949–January 16, 1953

FM 1294 was originally designated on July 14, 1949, running from SH 71 west of La Grange to a road intersection at a distance of 2.8 miles (4.5 km). The highway was extended 1.4 miles (2.3 km) to another road intersection on May 23, 1951. FM 1294 was cancelled on January 16, 1953, with the mileage being transferred to FM 609.

== FM 1295 ==
Farm to Market Road 1295
- Location: Fayette and Lavaca counties
- Length: 12.909 mi (20.775 km)
- Existed: 1949–present

== FM 1296 ==
Farm to Market Road 1296
- Location: Gonzales, Caldwell, and Bastrop counties
- Length: 8.714 mi (14.024 km)
- Existed: 1949–present

== FM 1297 ==
Farm to Market Road 1297
- Location: Bowie County
- Length: 1.227 mi (1.975 km)
- Existed: June 28, 1963–present

Farm to Market Road 1297 (FM 1297) is located in Bowie County in Texarkana. The highway is known locally as McKnight Road.

FM 1297 begins at an intersection with FM 2878 in the Pleasant Grove area of the city. The highway travels in an eastern direction and passes Pleasant Grove High School before ending at an intersection with FM 559.

The current FM 1297 was designated on June 28, 1963, running from FM 2878 to FM 559. The entire route was redesignated as Urban Road 1297 (UR 1297) on June 27, 1995. The designation reverted to FM 1297 with the elimination of the Urban Road system on November 15, 2018.

=== FM 1297 (1949) ===
Farm to Market Road 1297
- Location: Gonzales County
- Existed: July 14, 1949–May 24, 1962

A previous route numbered FM 1297 was designated on July 14, 1949, running from SH 200 (now SH 97) at Cost westward to a road intersection at a distance of 4.1 miles (6.6 km). The highway was extended 1.6 miles (2.6 km) northwestward to Monthalia on May 23, 1951. FM 1297 was extended 3.9 miles (6.3 km) northwestward of Monthalia to a road intersection on November 21, 1956. The highway was extended to SH 80 near Belmont on September 27, 1960. FM 1297 was extended to the Guadalupe County line on September 20, 1961. The highway was cancelled on May 24, 1962, with the mileage being transferred to FM 466.

== FM 1298 ==
Farm to Market Road 1298
- Location: Scurry and Mitchell counties
- Length: 9.144 mi (14.716 km)
- Existed: October 29, 1953–present

Farm to Market Road 1298 (FM 1298) is located in Scurry and Mitchell counties.

The current FM 1298 was designated in 1953, running from FM 1610 southward and westward to Thomas Dam at Lake J. B. Thomas. In 1957, the highway was extended southward to SH 350.

Junction list

County	Location	mi	km	Destinations	Notes
Mitchell		0.0	0.0	SH 350 – Big Spring, Snyder	
Scurry		7.2	11.6	FM 2085 east – Ira	
Scurry		9.1	14.6	FM 1610	
1.000 mi = 1.609 km; 1.000 km = 0.621 mi

=== FM 1298 (1949) ===
Farm to Market Road 1298
- Location: Lavaca County
- Existed: July 14, 1949–November 13, 1953

A previous route numbered FM 1298 was designated on July 14, 1949, from US 77, 2.5 miles (4.0 km) southwest of Hallettsville, north 2.5 miles (4.0 km) to a road intersection. FM 1298 was cancelled on November 13, 1953, and transferred to FM 340.

== FM 1299 ==
Farm to Market Road 1299
- Location: Wharton County
- Length: 6.65 mi (10.70 km)
- Existed: July 14, 1949–present

Farm to Market Road 1299 (FM 1299) is located in Wharton County. It runs from SH 60 southeast of Wharton to another point on SH 60 in Wharton. The highway runs parallel to the Colorado River for most of its length.

FM 1299 was designated on July 14, 1949, on the current route. On October 28, 1991, a 1-mile (1.6 km) section along East Avenue in Wharton was turned over to the city and county, and the road was rerouted over FM 3493 (which was cancelled).
