= Austonio, Texas =

- Unincorporated community
- Location within Texas Location within the United States
- Coordinates: 31°11′09″N 95°38′19″W
- Country: United States
- State: Texas
- County: Houston
- Elevation: 253 ft (77 m)
- Time zone: UTC-6 (Central (CST))
  - Summer (DST): UTC-5 (CDT)
- Area codes: 430 & 903
- GNIS feature ID: 1384224

Austonio is an unincorporated community in Houston County, Texas, United States. According to the Handbook of Texas, the community had a population of 37 in 2000.

== History ==
The community, originally named Pearville, was established before 1900. In 1930, the community sponsored a contest, asking participants to select a new name for the community. Ruth Tucker submitted the name "Austonio", a portmanteau of Austin and San Antonio; the name was chosen as the community's new name. A post office was established in 1932 and remained in operation until 1971. The community thrived before World War II hit and reached its population zenith of 150 in 1940, with four stores. It began its decline five years later. Most of its businesses closed in the late 1980s. Austonio has an estimated population of 37 in 1990 and 2000.

== Geography ==
Austonio is located at the intersection of Texas State Highway 21 and Farm to Market Road 1280, 14 mi (23 km) southwest of Crockett and 13 mi (21 km) west of Lovelady in western Houston County.

== Education ==
Austonio had a school that also served the communities of Ash, Mapleton, and Creek in 1931. It joined the Lovelady ISD in 1964.

Most of Austonio is within the Lovelady Independent School District. A small portion north/northeast of FM 1280 falls within the Crockett Independent School District.

== Government ==
The Austonio Fire Department serves the community.

== Gallery ==
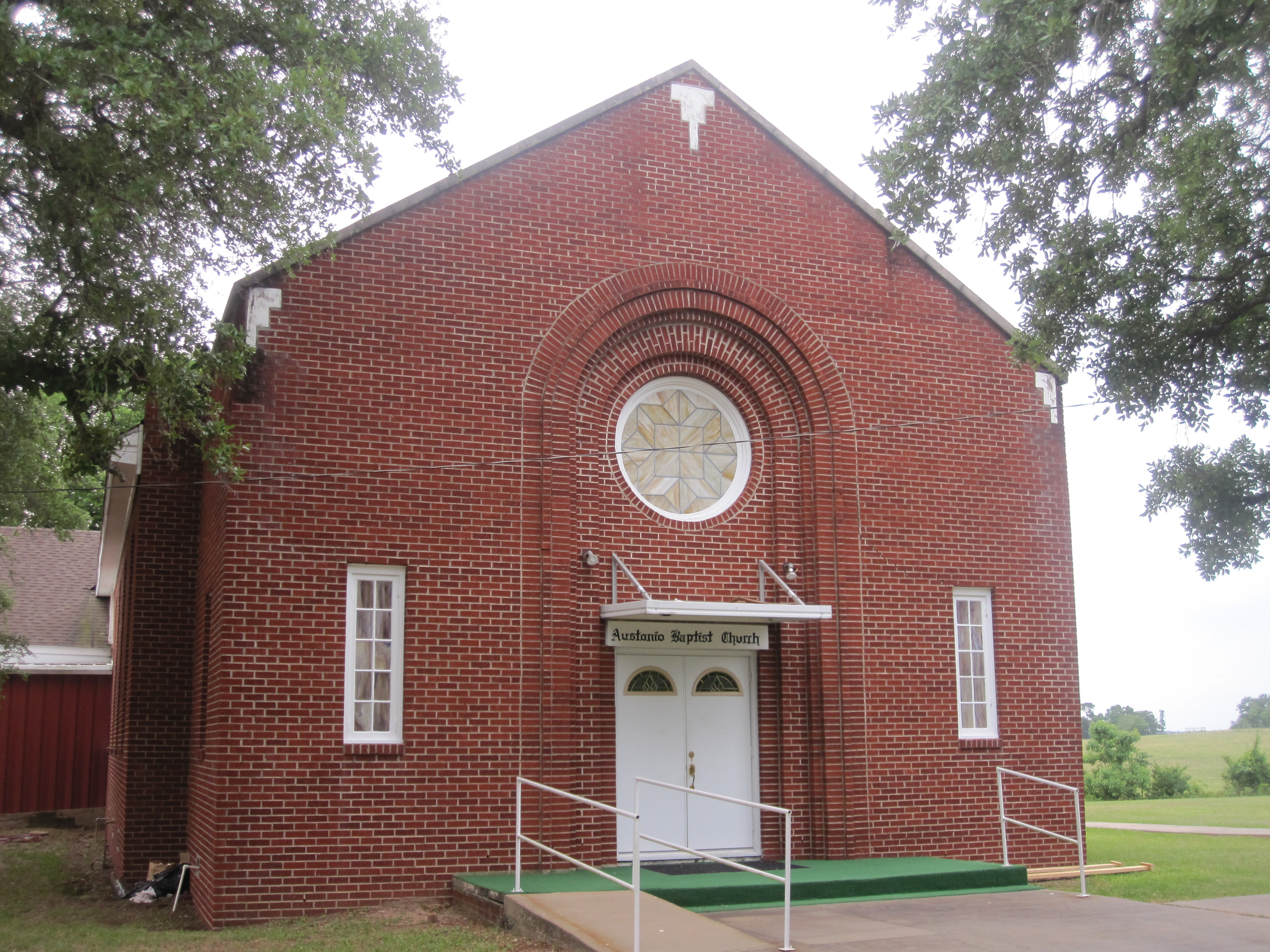
Austonio Baptist Church

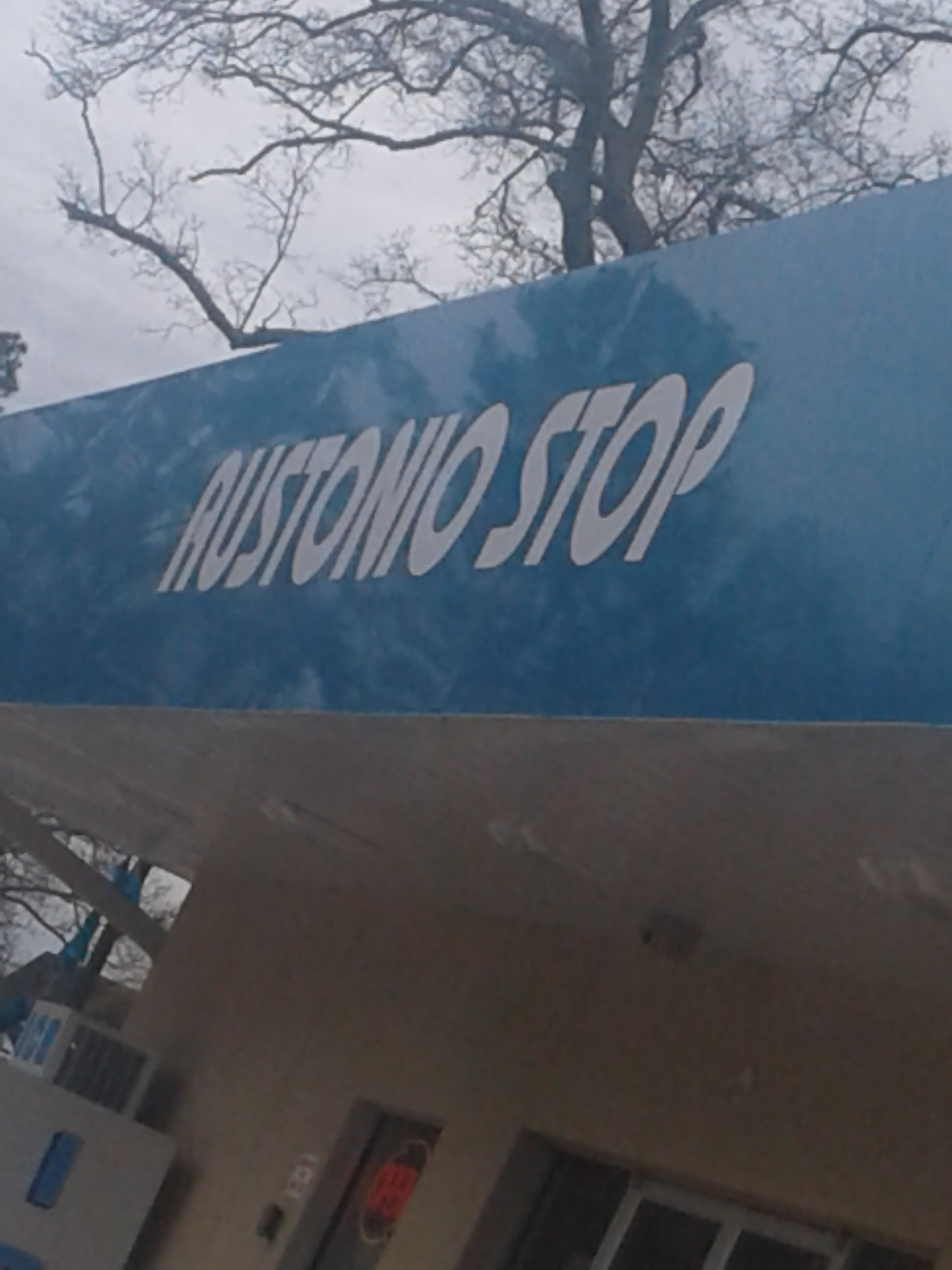
Austonio Stop, the only store in the town.

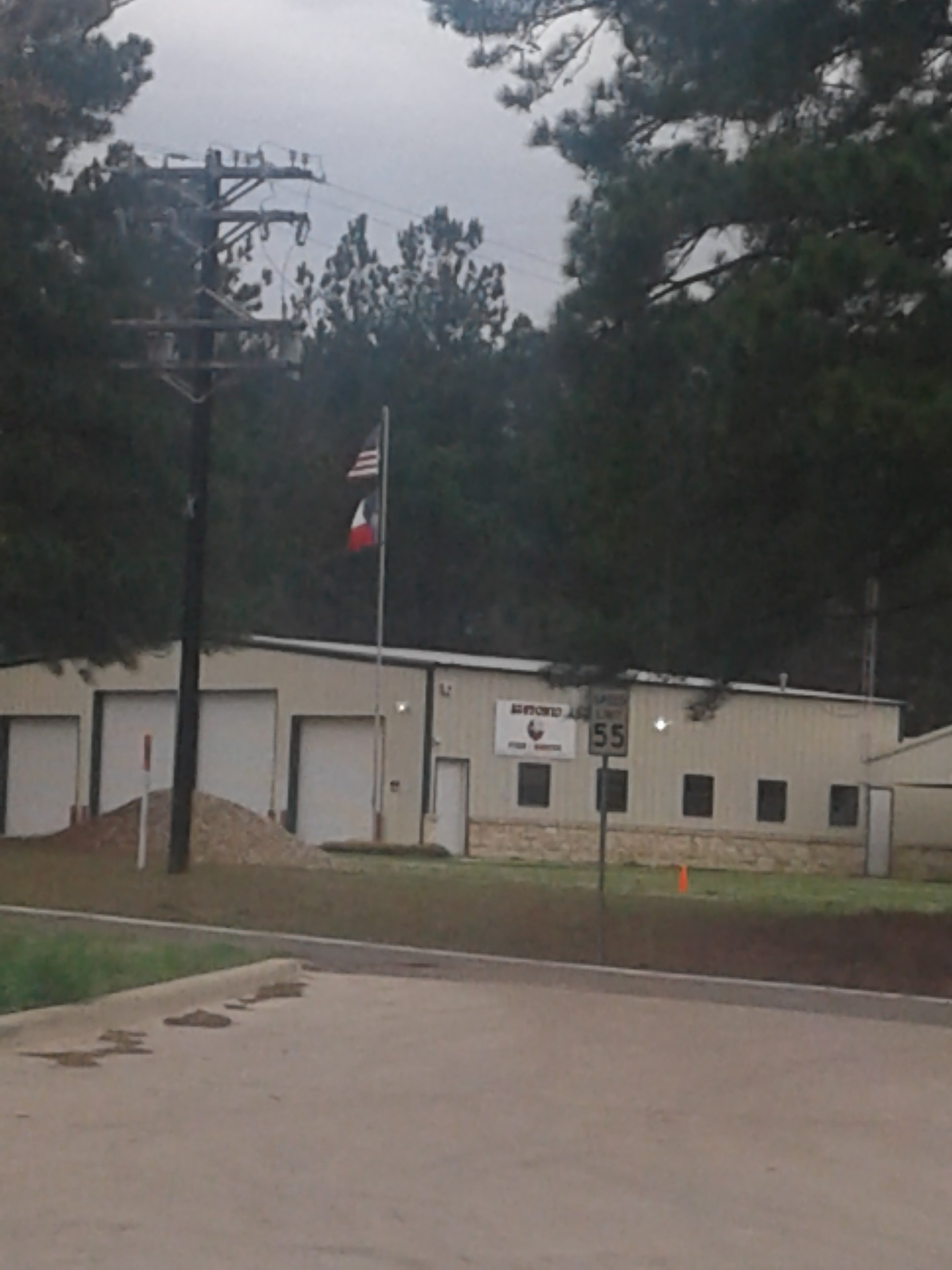
Austonio fire department is the only form of government in the town.
