= Abe, Texas =

Ghost town in Texas, US

Abe is a ghost town in Houston County, Texas, United States. Situated five miles southwest of Lovelady, Texas, it was settled in the mid-1880s, having a post office in 1887 and 1888. By the 1930s, it was abandoned.
