= Red Bluff =

Red Bluff(s) may refer to several places in North America:

== Places ==
=== Canada ===
- Red Bluff, British Columbia, a community near Quesnel, British Columbia, Canada
  - Red Bluff First Nation, a First Nations band government headquartered near Quesnel, British Columbia

=== United States ===
- Red Bluff, Arkansas, a former village in Jefferson County
- Red Bluff, California, a city in and the county seat of Tehama County
- Red Bluff, South Carolina, an unincorporated community in Marlboro County

== Other uses ==
- Red Bluff (Mississippi landmark), a geologic formation in Mississippi
- Red Bluff Reservoir, a reservoir on the Texas-New Mexico border

== See also ==
- Red Bluff Creek (disambiguation)
