= Pearson's Chapel, Texas =

- Unincorporated community
- Location within Texas Location within the United States
- Coordinates: 31°9′5″N 95°32′36″W
- County: Houston
- Established: Before 1900
- Elevation: 324.0 ft (98.75 m)

Population (1990)
  - Total: Dispersed
- Time zone: UTC-6 (Central (CST))
  - Summer (DST): UTC-5 (CDT)

Pearson's Chapel was an unincorporated community in Houston County, Texas, United States, now a ghost town, 6 miles (10 km) west of Lovelady. Only a Baptist church remains in the area. It was located at the intersection of FM 1280, FM 3151, and the old Huntsville Road

== Education ==
The community of Pearson's Chapel is served by the Lovelady Independent School District.

== Notable person ==
Charles Harrelson, contract killer who slew federal judge 'Maximum John' Wood and was the father of actor Woody, grew up one mile from Pearson's Chapel.
