= Linda Faye Williams =

African-American political scientist

Linda Faye Williams (1949–2006) was an American political scientist known for her work in race and gender politics and for being the first Black woman to graduate from Rice University in Texas.

== Early life and education ==
Growing up in Lovelady, Texas, a small town located over an hour north of Houston, she attended Center Grove High School and graduated as both valedictorian and National Merit Scholar. Her father, a school principal at the time, wanted her to attend the historically black college Prairie View A&M University, his alma mater, but her heart was set on Rice University, where she and another student became two of the first African Americans to graduate after desegregation.

== Career ==
Williams entered Rice University in 1966 and started out as an English major but during her junior year, she took a political sociology course with Chandler Davidson and she wrote a 50-page research paper on civil rights and the voting act in the context of East Texas politics. Impressed with her work, Davidson encouraged her to undertake graduate training, which she pursued at the University of Chicago, where she won a highly-acclaimed Woodrow Wilson fellowship and earned a master's degree in 1973 and a doctorate in 1977, both in political science.

While her time at Rice University was very fruitful, there were moments when she faced adversity and racism. Williams told Sallyport (Rice University’s Magazine predecessor) in a 1988 interview, “It was the loneliest I had been in my entire life”. She also stated how she often had to explain to her white friends why she hated them having a Confederate flag hanging in their living room.

Williams joined the faculty at Howard University in 1977 and taught courses in political science. In the course of her career as a research scholar, professor, mentor and activist, Williams worked with many different academic institutions, including the Joint Center for Political Studies, Harvard's Kennedy School of Government, and the Institute for Policy Research and Education through the Congressional Black Caucus Foundation. She started in 1991 as associate professor of government of politics at the University of Maryland, and in 2004 she became a full professor.

== Contributions to political science ==
Williams' research has made significant contributions to the field of political science, particularly in the areas of racial and gender related studies. As a political scientist, she wrote about Black women in politics as both elected officials and political activists. With her husband, Ralph C. Gomes, she wrote about the African-American struggle for political power and representation. Williams' work has shed light on the intersection of politics and healthcare, influencing both scholarly debates and policy decisions.

== Awards and honors ==
Throughout her career, Williams received numerous awards and honors for her contributions to political science. These include the W.E.B. Du Bois Book Award.

== Selected publications ==
Her best-known, highly-acclaimed book is The Constraint of Race: Legacies of White Skin Privilege in America (2003). In this book, Williams explores the concept of white skin privilege and its impact on American society. She delves into the historical roots of racial inequality, examining how systems of privilege have been perpetuated over time.
