= Creek, Texas =

Unincorporated community in Texas, US

Coordinates: 31°10′02″N 95°36′42″W

Creek, also known as Georgia Camp, is an unincorporated community in Houston County, Texas, United States. Creek is located on Farm to Market Road 1280, 15 miles (24 km) southwest of Crockett. The community was founded after the Civil War, and by the 1880s it had a school and a post office. At its peak in the 1890s, the community had a population of 150 and many businesses; by the 1990s, its population was scattered and it had only retained its church and cemetery.
