= Hext, Texas =

- unincorporated community
- Location within the state of Texas Hext, Texas (the United States)
- Coordinates: 30°52′09″N 99°31′43″W
- Country: United States
- State: Texas
- County: Menard
- Elevation: 1,850 ft (560 m)

Population (2000)
  - Total: 73
- Time zone: UTC-6 (Central (CST))
  - Summer (DST): UTC-5 (CDT)
- ZIP code: 76848
- Area code: 325
- FIPS code: 48-33440
- GNIS feature ID: 1379923

Hext is an unincorporated community in Menard County, Texas, United States. According to the Handbook of Texas, the community had an estimated population of 73 in 2000.

== History ==
The community was first known as Maringo (or Marengo) when it was settled in the 1870s. When local residents attempted to establish a post office in 1895, they found that Maringo was already taken and decided on the name Hext in honor of Joseph Robert "Bob" Hext (1859–1941). Mr. Hext was one of the first settlers in the area. The post office was established in 1897, which made the name permanent.

Hext reached its peak around 1914, when it had 125 residents, two general stores, a hotel, cotton gin, and a Church of Christ that had been organized in 1904. A Baptist church was established in 1916. The community's population had declined to 40 by the mid-1920s, but rebounded to around 60 in the late 1940s. By 1988, Hext reported 64 residents. That figure had grown slightly, to 73, by 2000.

Although Hext is unincorporated, it continues to have a post office in operation with the zip code of 76848. Several abandoned buildings remain in Hext, such as an old schoolhouse and church.

== Geography ==
Hext is situated at the intersection of State Highway 29 and FM 1221, approximately 16 miles east of Menard and 131 miles northwest of Austin in eastern Menard County.

=== Climate ===
Hext experiences a humid subtropical climate, with hot summers and a generally mild winter. Temperatures range from 95 °F (35 C) in the summer to 31 °F (-.06 C) during winter.

Climate data for Hext, Texas
Month	Jan	Feb	Mar	Apr	May	Jun	Jul	Aug	Sep	Oct	Nov	Dec	Year
Record high °F (°C)	91 (33)	97 (36)	98 (37)	107 (42)	114 (46)	112 (44)	110 (43)	109 (43)	109 (43)	99 (37)	91 (33)	87 (31)	114 (46)
Mean daily maximum °F (°C)	60 (16)	66 (19)	73 (23)	81 (27)	87 (31)	91 (33)	95 (35)	94 (34)	88 (31)	80 (27)	69 (21)	61 (16)	79 (26)
Daily mean °F (°C)	46 (8)	50 (10)	58 (14)	65 (18)	73 (23)	79 (26)	81 (27)	80 (27)	75 (24)	66 (19)	54 (12)	47 (8)	65 (18)
Mean daily minimum °F (°C)	31 (−1)	35 (2)	43 (6)	50 (10)	59 (15)	66 (19)	68 (20)	67 (19)	61 (16)	51 (11)	40 (4)	32 (0)	50 (10)
Record low °F (°C)	−2 (−19)	−1 (−18)	7 (−14)	20 (−7)	27 (−3)	43 (6)	48 (9)	40 (4)	33 (1)	21 (−6)	9 (−13)	−6 (−21)	−6 (−21)
Average precipitation inches (mm)	.97 (25)	1.48 (38)	1.60 (41)	1.72 (44)	3.22 (82)	3.38 (86)	2.14 (54)	2.34 (59)	2.69 (68)	2.57 (65)	1.51 (38)	1.28 (33)	24.9 (633)
Source: The Weather Channel

== Education ==
Public education in the community of Hext is provided by the Menard Independent School District.
