= Ash, Texas =

- Unincorporated community
- Location within Texas Location within the United States
- Coordinates: 31°11′43″N 95°41′32″W
- Country: United States
- State: Texas
- County: Houston
- Elevation: 226 ft (69 m)
- Time zone: UTC-6 (Central (CST))
  - Summer (DST): UTC-5 (CDT)
- Area codes: 430 & 903
- GNIS feature ID: 1379367

Ash is an unincorporated community in Houston County, Texas, United States. According to the Handbook of Texas, the community had a population of 19 in 2000.

== History ==
James B. Ash, a prominent local figure, was honored when Ash was founded in 1870. In 1890, a post office was established there, and by 1896, the settlement included a gristmill-gin and general store. The village had a chapel, two stores, and a handful of dwellings in the middle of the 1930s despite the post office closing in 1909; 10 people were thought to have lived there in 1936. The shops shuttered after World War II, and by the early 1970s, only a church and a few dispersed dwellings remained. Ash was a dispersed rural village in the early 1990s, for which there were no demographic estimates. However, just 19 people were living there in 2000.

== Geography ==
Ash is located 16 miles (26 km) southwest of Crockett at the western terminus of FM 1280.

== Education ==
Ash School opened in 1890 and had 58 students enrolled in 1897. Today, the community is served by the Lovelady Independent School District.
