= Red Bluff Creek (Satilla River tributary) =

Tributary of the Satilla River in Georgia, USA

Coordinates: 31°17′15.74″N 82°40′0.51″W

Red Bluff Creek is a stream in the U.S. state of Georgia. It is a tributary to the Satilla River.

Red Bluff Creek's red bluffs suggest its name.
