= Red Bluff Creek (Medina River tributary) =

Stream in Bandera and Kendall County, Texas, U.S.

Coordinates: 29.6690°N 98.9705°W

- Map

Location
- Country: United States
- State: Texas

Physical characteristics
- Mouth: Medina River

Red Bluff Creek is a stream in Bandera and Kendall counties, Texas, in the United States.

Red Bluff Creek was so named from the reddish steep banks along the creek.

== See also ==
- List of rivers of Texas
