= Lovelady, Texas =

- City
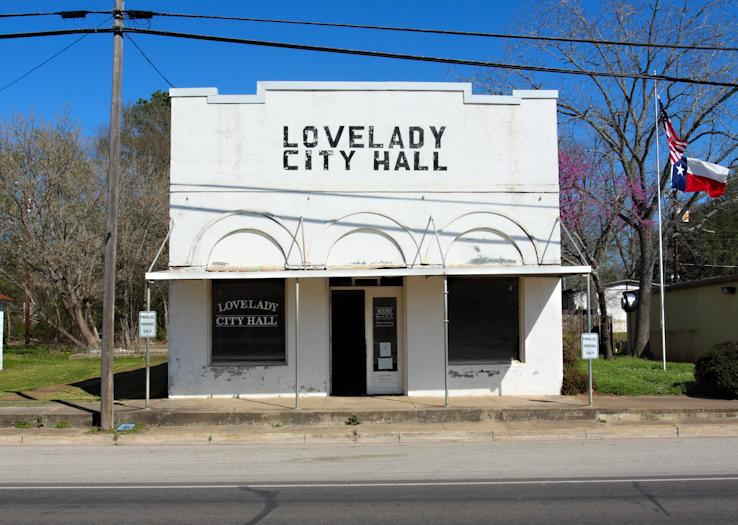
- Lovelady City Hall

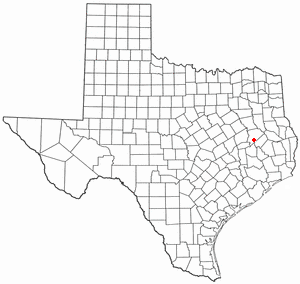
- Location of Lovelady, Texas

- Coordinates: 31°07′29″N 95°26′43″W
- Country: United States
- State: Texas
- County: Houston
- Established: 1927

Area
  - Total: 1.33 sq mi (3.44 km^{2})
  - Land: 1.32 sq mi (3.42 km^{2})
  - Water: 0.0077 sq mi (0.02 km^{2})
- Elevation: 299 ft (91 m)

Population (2020)
  - Total: 570
  - Density: 474.7/sq mi (183.27/km^{2})
- Time zone: UTC-6 (Central (CST))
  - Summer (DST): UTC-5 (CDT)
- ZIP code: 75851
- Area code: 936
- FIPS code: 48-44260
- GNIS feature ID: 2410885

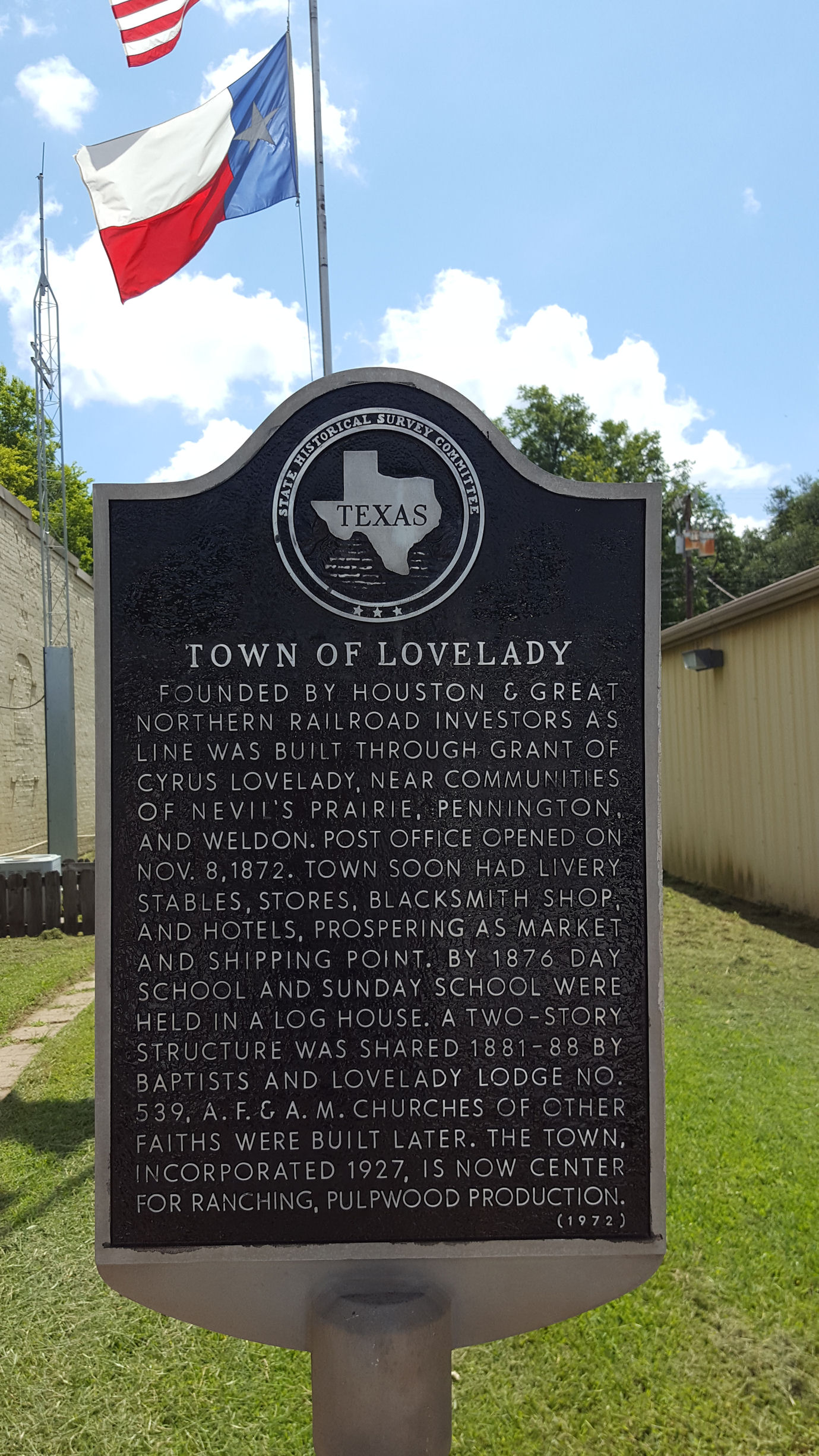
Historical Marker of the City of Lovelady

Lovelady is a town in Houston County, Texas, United States. The population was 570 at the 2020 census.

== History ==
Lovelady was founded by investors of the Houston & Great Northern Railroad as a railway line was built through a land grant of Cyrus Lovelady, near the communities of Nevil's Prairie, Pennington, and Weldon. The U.S. Post Office opened on November 8, 1872. The town soon had livery, stables, blacksmith shop, and hotels, prospering as both a marketplace and a shipping point. By 1876 a public school was held in a local log house. Lovelady was incorporated in 1927.

== Geography ==
Lovelady is located in southern Houston County. Texas State Highway 19 runs through the center of town as Commerce Street, leading north 14 miles (23 km) to Crockett, the county seat, and south the same distance to Trinity.

According to the United States Census Bureau, Lovelady has a total area of 1.3 square miles (3.4 km^{2}), of which 0.01 square miles (0.02 km^{2}), or 0.44%, are water. The city is drained to the west by tributaries of Tantabogue Creek and to the east by tributaries of Gail Creek, both of which flow south to White Rock Creek, part of the Trinity River watershed.

=== Climate ===
The climate in this area is characterized by hot, humid summers and generally mild to cool winters. According to the Köppen Climate Classification system, Lovelady has a humid subtropical climate, abbreviated "Cfa" on climate maps.

== Demographics ==
Historical population
Census	Pop.	Note	%±
1920	625		—
1930	502		−19.7%
1940	542		8.0%
1950	541		−0.2%
1960	466		−13.9%
1970	388		−16.7%
1980	509		31.2%
1990	587		15.3%
2000	608		3.6%
2010	649		6.7%
2020	570		−12.2%
U.S. Decennial Census

=== 2020 census ===
As of the 2020 census, Lovelady had a population of 570 and 219 households.

The median age was 38.7 years. 26.0% of residents were under the age of 18 and 16.8% of residents were 65 years of age or older. For every 100 females there were 85.7 males, and for every 100 females age 18 and over there were 85.9 males age 18 and over.

Of the 219 households in Lovelady, 36.1% had children under the age of 18 living in them, 46.6% were married-couple households, 18.3% had a male householder with no spouse or partner present, 30.1% had a female householder with no spouse or partner present, 25.6% were made up of individuals, and 13.7% had someone living alone who was 65 years of age or older.

There were 282 housing units, of which 22.3% were vacant. The homeowner vacancy rate was 2.1% and the rental vacancy rate was 17.0%.

0.0% of residents lived in urban areas, while 100.0% lived in rural areas.

Racial composition as of the 2020 census
Race	Number	Percent
White	425	74.6%
Black or African American	68	11.9%
American Indian and Alaska Native	7	1.2%
Asian	6	1.1%
Native Hawaiian and Other Pacific Islander	0	0.0%
Some other race	22	3.9%
Two or more races	42	7.4%
Hispanic or Latino (of any race)	78	13.7%

=== 2000 census ===
As of the 2000 census, there were 608 people, 240 households, and 175 families residing in the city. The population density was 543.9 inhabitants per square mile (210.0/km^{2}). There were 293 housing units at an average density of 262.1 per square mile (101.2/km^{2}). The racial makeup of the city was 90.95% White, 7.40% Black, 0.16% Native American, 1.15% from other races, and 0.33% from two or more races. Hispanic or Latino of any race were 3.12% of the population.

There were 240 households, out of which 35.0% had children under the age of 18 living with them, 57.5% were married couples living together, 11.7% had a female householder with no husband present, and 26.7% were non-families. 24.6% of all households were made up of individuals, and 16.3% had someone living alone who was 65 years of age or older. The average household size was 2.53 and the average family size was 3.03.

In the city, the population was spread out, with 28.8% under the age of 18, 5.6% from 18 to 24, 23.5% from 25 to 44, 21.1% from 45 to 64, and 21.1% who were 65 years of age or older. The median age was 37 years. For every 100 females, there were 94.9 males. For every 100 females age 18 and over, there were 82.7 males.

The median income for a household in the city was $30,000, and the median income for a family was $40,000. Males had a median income of $30,341 versus $19,028 for females. The per capita income for the city was $14,624. About 11.6% of families and 11.2% of the population were below the poverty line, including 12.2% of those under age 18 and 15.8% of those age 65 or over.

== Notable people ==
- Charles Harrelson, murderer and father of Woody Harrelson
- Linda Faye Williams, political scientist and first Black woman graduate of Rice University

== Economy ==
Lovelady is perhaps best known for the Texas Department of Criminal Justice – Eastham Unit, a medium security penitentiary housing some 2,400 inmates for various offenses. The local economy is dependent on the employment of the local workforce at the prison, which has a current staff of 718 employees.

== Government and infrastructure ==
Eastham Unit, a Texas Department of Criminal Justice prison for men, is located in unincorporated Houston County, southwest of Lovelady.

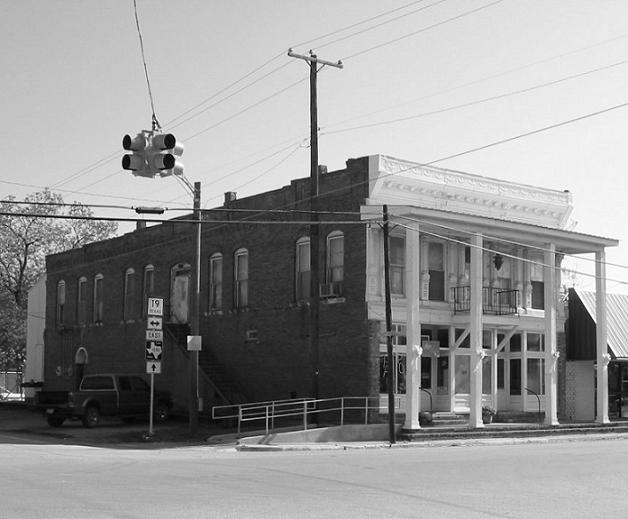
C. R. Rich Building

== Education ==
The city is served by the Lovelady Independent School District.

== Architecture ==
Charles Rufus Rich (1857–1945) completed this building in 1906 as a combination ground floor general mercantile store and second floor residence. A native of Texas, Rich had opened his business in Lovelady in the early 1900s.
