= David Henry Hamilton =

American politician (1843–1929)

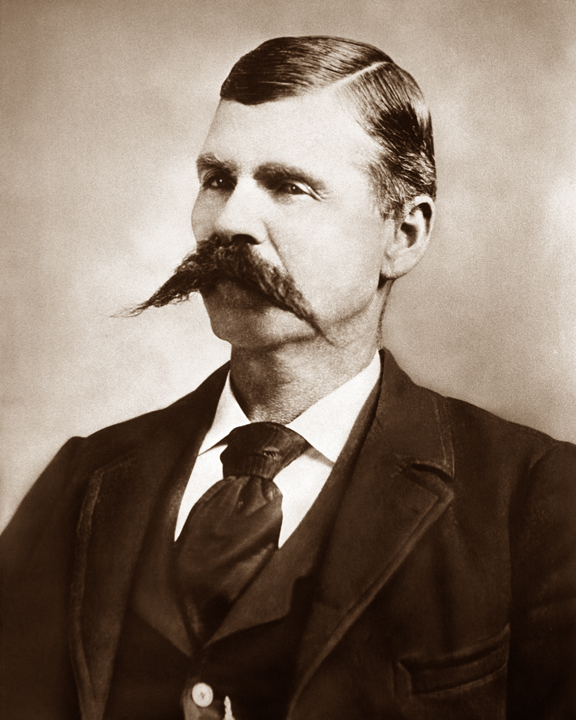
- Born: 8 August 1843; Oxford, Mississippi, US
- Died: 30 May 1929 (aged 85); Groveton, Trinity County, Texas, US
- Other name: D H Hamilton
- Spouse: Mary Isabell Gaston
- Military career
- Allegiance: Confederate States of America
- Branch: Confederate States Army
- Service years: 1862–1865
- Rank: Sergeant
- Unit: 1st Texas Volunteer Infantry
- Conflicts: American Civil War

David Henry "D. H." Hamilton (August 8, 1843 – May 30, 1929) was a Texas farmer, businessman, and statesman. Hamilton volunteered to join the Texas Brigade (also known as Hood's Brigade) Company M, First Texas Volunteer Infantry, at the age of 17. After the surrender at the Appomattox Court House during the American Civil War, he returned home to Sumpter, Texas, May 25, 1865, without serious injury, and lived in Centralia and Groveton in Trinity County and Haskell in Haskell County.

== Biography ==
David's father, John Hamilton, moved from Oxford, Mississippi, to Rusk County, Texas, in 1846. In 1852 he moved to Trinity County and located at a spring near the center of Nogalus Prairie. He sold this place to Byrd Kerr and settled 2.5 miles (4.0 km) north of there on a small prairie which went by the family name. In 1854, John Hamilton was elected County Surveyor and moved near Sumpter, opening a farm 1.5 miles (2.4 km) east of town on Homer or Clark's Ferry road. A large hewn log school house was erected in Sumpter, one block west and two blocks south of the plaza. David attended this school for a short time. John was accidentally injured on the job and his frequent absence to attend to official business required David assist his father in the survey work.

After the Civil War, David Hamilton served as the Trinity County Sheriff from 1865 to 1867. He married Mary Isabell Gaston on November 8, 1867. David and his family moved to Centralia, Texas when the county seat was moved from Sumpter to Centralia, where he operated a gristmill, sawmill, and farm. He was in the mercantile business for over 10 years. He also served in the Texas House of Representatives in the Twenty-third Texas Legislature from January 10, 1893, to January 8, 1895. He was a member of the Democratic Party. His district covered the counties of Montgomery, Trinity, and Walker.

In 1895, Hamilton and his wife sold their possessions and moved to Haskell County where he tried farming, and then was elected as County Judge. Then they moved to the city of Haskell. His wife, Mary, broke her hip and they decided to move back to Trinity County, where children John Gibson, Mary Annice and Octavia (Eddie) were living. While living in Groveton, David wrote a memoir of his Civil War experiences as a volunteer in Hood's Texas Brigade. Hamilton and his wife had eight children: John Gibson Hamilton, Mary Annice Hamilton, Maranda Alzera Hamilton, Vera Alice Hamilton, Alzara Gertrude Hamilton, Dudley Warner Hamilton, Octavia Edmonia (Eddie) Hamilton, and Allene Hamilton.

Hamilton was the great-great-grandfather of Governor of Texas Rick Perry.
