= Centerville, Trinity County, Texas =

- Unincorporated community
- Location within Texas Location within the United States
- Coordinates: 31°10′50″N 95°02′35″W
- Country: United States
- State: Texas
- County: Trinity
- Elevation: 364 ft (111 m)
- Time zone: UTC-6 (Central (CST))
  - Summer (DST): UTC-5 (CDT)
- Area codes: 430 & 903
- GNIS feature ID: 1381620

Centerville is an unincorporated community located in Trinity County, Texas, United States. According to the Handbook of Texas, the community had a population of 60 in 2000. It is located within the Huntsville, Texas micropolitan area.

== History ==
The town was established in 1935. The population was 400 in the 1960s but declined in the 1970s and 1980s. The population was 40 in 1990 and 60 in 2000. Most of its residents were farmers, ranchers, and foresters.

== Geography ==
Centerville is located at the intersection of Texas State Highway 94 and Farm to Market Road 358, 9 mi (14 km) northeast of Groveton in northeastern Trinity County.

== Education ==
The community's school was built in 1935. The school remains and is classified by the University Interscholastic League as an "A" school. It is served by the Centerville Independent School District.
