= Crecy, Texas =

- Unincorporated community
- Location within Texas Location within the United States
- Coordinates: 31°12′5″N 95°03′19″W
- Country: United States
- State: Texas
- County: Trinity
- Elevation: 361 ft (110 m)
- Time zone: UTC-6 (Central (CST))
  - Summer (DST): UTC-5 (CDT)
- Area codes: 430 & 903
- GNIS feature ID: 1381714

Crecy is an unincorporated community located in Trinity County, Texas, United States. According to the Handbook of Texas, the community had a population of 15 in 2000. It is located within the Huntsville, Texas micropolitan area.

== History ==
The area was first settled sometime after the American Civil War by a family surnamed Terry.

== Geography ==
Crecy is located on Farm to Market Road 233, 11 mi (18 km) northeast of Groveton in northeastern Trinity County.

== Education ==
Crecy is served by the Centerville Independent School District.
