= Friday, Texas =

- Unincorporated community
- Location within Texas Location within the United States
- Coordinates: 31°06′30″N 95°15′44″W
- Country: United States
- State: Texas
- County: Trinity
- Elevation: 276 ft (84 m)
- Time zone: UTC-6 (Central (CST))
  - Summer (DST): UTC-5 (CDT)
- Area code: 936
- GNIS feature ID: 1379803

Friday is an unincorporated community in Trinity County, Texas, United States. According to the Handbook of Texas, the community had a population of 99 in 2000. It is located within the Huntsville, Texas micropolitan area.

== History ==
Friday was originally known as Ellis Prairie for Benjamin Ellis, who received a land grant in 1839. It was settled around the time of the American Civil War. A post office opened in 1903 and closed in 1955. In 1914, Friday had a general store, a cotton gin, and a gristmill. The store and post office were still in Friday in 1947 and had 50 residents. Mail was then delivered from Groveton. By the 1990s, Friday had a store, a community center, a cemetery, and some homes. Its population was 41 in 1990 and 99 in 2000.

== Geography ==
The community is located along Farm to Market Road 1280, 9 miles (14 km) northwest of Groveton in northwestern Trinity County.

== Education ==
Ellis Prairie School opened in the community in 1884. Today, the community is served by the Groveton Independent School District.
