= Carlisle, Texas =

Carlisle
- Unincorporated community
- Location within the state of Texas Carlisle (the United States)
- Coordinates: 30°52′26″N 95°12′25″W
- Country: United States
- State: Texas
- County: Trinity
- Elevation: 191 ft (58 m)

Population (2000)
  - Total: 68
- Time zone: UTC-6 (Central (CST))
  - Summer (DST): UTC-5 (CDT)

Carlisle is an unincorporated community in Trinity County, Texas, United States. Its population is 68 as of 2000. It is located within the Huntsville, Texas micropolitan area.

== History ==
The area in what is known as Carlisle today was first settled during the Civil War but did not become an actual community until the late 19th century. The community was named after John Carlisle who established mills in the Carlisle and Carmona areas. The community became a stop on the Beaumont and Great Northern Railway when a track was built through the area around 1900. A post office was established in 1906 and discontinued in 1955. The population went down from 100 in the early 1930s, to 95 in 1990, then to 68 in 2000.

== Geography ==
Carlisle is located on Farm to Market Road 356, 14 mi (23 km) southwest of Groveton in southwestern Trinity County.

== Education ==
Carlisle is served by the Groveton Independent School District.

== Notable person ==
Ernestine Glossbrenner, teacher and politician, grew up in Carlisle.
