= Chita, Texas =

Chita
- Unincorporated community
- Location within the state of Texas
- Coordinates: 30°56′12″N 95°12′30″W
- Country: United States
- State: Texas
- County: Trinity
- Elevation: 296 ft (90 m)

Population (2000)
  - Total: 81
- Time zone: UTC-6 (Central (CST))
  - Summer (DST): UTC-5 (CDT)

Chita is an unincorporated community in Trinity County, Texas, United States. According to the Handbook of Texas, the community had a population of 81 in 2000. It is located within the Huntsville, Texas micropolitan area.

== History ==
The area was settled around the Civil War era; the community itself was not established until the 1890s. In 1895, a post office was established and remained in operation until 1929. The community had a general store, a cotton gin, a gristmill, and a stone and sand company in 1914. Sixty people lived there that year. In the mid-1930s, the community had 75 residents and two businesses. As the population declined in the 1950s and 1960s, it then rose again due to its proximity to Lake Livingston. The population remained at 75 in 1990. In 2000, the population was 81.

== Geography ==
Chita is located on Farm to Market Road 355, 9 mi (14 km) southwest of Groveton in southwestern Trinity County.

== Education ==
Chita had its own school in 1896. Today, the community is served by the Groveton Independent School District.
