= Lacy, Texas =

- Unincorporated community
- Location within Texas Location within the United States
- Coordinates: 31°06′17″N 95°05′19″W
- Country: United States
- State: Texas
- County: Trinity
- Elevation: 292 ft (89 m)
- Time zone: UTC-6 (Central (CST))
  - Summer (DST): UTC-5 (CDT)
- Area codes: 430 & 903
- GNIS feature ID: 2034819

Lacy is an unincorporated community in Trinity County, Texas, United States. According to the Handbook of Texas, the community had a population of 44 in 2000. It is located within the Huntsville, Texas micropolitan area.

== History ==
The area in what is known as Lacy today was founded by freed slaves sometime after the Civil War. A church that was organized sometime before 1900 became the focal point of the settlement. In the 1930s, Lacy had a church, a cemetery, and a few houses. Some 20 families, most of whom were descendants of the original settlers, still lived here in the early 1990s, most of whom were Black. The population was 44 as of 2000.

== Geography ==
Lacy is located on Farm to Market Road 3317, 4 mi (6.4 km) north of Groveton in north-central Trinity County.

== Education ==
Lacy had its own school in the 1930s. Today, the community is served by the Groveton Independent School District.
