= Sebastopol, Texas =

- Unincorporated community
- Location within Texas Location within the United States
- Coordinates: 30°54′35″N 95°14′59″W
- Country: United States
- State: Texas
- County: Trinity
- Elevation: 157 ft (48 m)
- Time zone: UTC-6 (Central (CST))
  - Summer (DST): UTC-5 (CDT)
- Area codes: 430 & 903
- GNIS feature ID: 1380509

Sebastopol is an unincorporated community in Trinity County, Texas, United States. According to the Handbook of Texas, the community had a population of 120 in 2000. It is located within the Huntsville, Texas micropolitan area.

== Geography ==
Sebastopol is located on Farm-to-Market Roads 355 and 356, 14 mi (23 km) southwest of Groveton, 49 mi (79 km) southwest of Lufkin, and 30 mi (48 km) northeast of Huntsville in southwestern Trinity County. It is also near Lake Livingston.

== Education ==
Today, the community is served by the Groveton Independent School District.

== Notable people ==
- Cody Johnson, country singer.
