= Woodlake, Texas =

Woodlake
- Unincorporated community
- Location within the state of Texas Woodlake (the United States)
- Coordinates: 31°1′44″N 95°1′59″W
- Country: United States
- State: Texas
- County: Trinity
- Time zone: UTC-6 (Central (CST))
  - Summer (DST): UTC-5 (CDT)
- Zip codes: 75865

Woodlake is an unincorporated community in Trinity County, Texas, United States. In 2000, the estimated population was 98 residents. It is located within the Huntsville, Texas micropolitan area.

== Historical development ==
The region was populated around the time of the American Civil War, but it was only when John Martin Thompson and Henry Tucker created the Thompson and Tucker Lumber Company in the early 1880s that a settlement started to take shape. The Willard post office opened in 1889, and throughout the following 20 years, the community went by several names, including Old Willard and Jason. There were 250 residents living in the town by 1896, along with Presbyterian and Methodist churches, a lumberyard, a mill, and a general store. However, by World War I, the majority of the local timber had been cut, the mill had closed, and the plant had been destroyed. Many of the locals relocated to nearby sawmill towns. According to one version, the post office was shut down in 1910, but reopened in 1920 under the name Jason, after eminent black resident Jason Hawthorne. Following the tiny reservoir that had supplied the mill, the name was changed to Woodlake in 1925. Helen Kerr Thompson, a descendant of the original mill owner, set up a model farm in the 1920s. The Waco, Beaumont, Trinity and Sabine Railway's failure, combined with the Great Depression's impacts, caused the project to fail in the late 1920s after the construction of a trading station, a community center, and several homes. The initiative to assist farmers on relief registers was taken over by the American government in 1934. Numerous new homes were built, but the project collapsed once more. Many of the population had left by the late 1930s. The Baptist Church of East Texas built a youth camp using the majority of the community's structures and a large portion of its equipment, which were sold to them. With 301 residents, Woodlake was a small, dispersed town in 1990. The population fell to 98 people in 2000.

Although Woodlake is unincorporated, it has a post office, with the ZIP Code 75865.

== Geography ==
Woodlake is located on U.S. Route 287, four miles southeast of Groveton in southeastern Trinity County.

== Education ==
Woodlake had a school hosting 11 grade levels in 1934. Today, the community is served by the Groveton Independent School District.
