= Brush Prairie, Texas =

Brush Prairie
- Unincorporated community
- Location within the state of Texas Brush Prairie (the United States)
- Coordinates: 31°05′28.7″N 95°18′29.6″W
- Country: United States
- State: Texas
- County: Trinity
- Elevation: 203 ft (62 m)
- Time zone: UTC-6 (Central (CST))
  - Summer (DST): UTC-5 (CDT)

Brush Prairie, also known as Brushy Creek, is a community founded in 1900 in Trinity County, Texas, United States on FM 1280, 11 miles from Groveton, near Zion Hill.
