= Groveton High School =

Groveton High School may refer to:

- Groveton High School (New Hampshire) — Groveton, New Hampshire
- Groveton High School (Texas) — Groveton, Texas
- West Potomac High School (formerly Groveton High School) — Alexandria, Virginia

See also:

- Grovetown High School
