= Nigton, Texas =

Nigton
- Unincorporated Community
- Location within the state of Texas Nigton (the United States)
- Coordinates: 31°13′18″N 94°54′28″W
- County: Trinity
- Founder: former slaves

Population (2000)
  - Total: 87

Nigton is an unincorporated community in Trinity County, Texas, United States. In 2000, the population was 87. It is located within the Huntsville, Texas micropolitan area.

== History ==
The town was founded in 1873 by former slaves. Jeff Carter, a civic leader and former slave during the early years of the settlement, suggested the name Nigton. In 1894, a post office was established. By 1896, the community had three churches, a sawmill and gin, a wagon maker, a shoemaker, and a reported population of 500. The post office was closed on April 30, 1932. In the 1940s, a church and store remained. It had a population of only 10 residents. In the 1990s, the population began to grow, reporting 34 residents in the 1990 United States census, many of whom were descendants of the original settlers. By the 2000 United States census, the population was 87.

In 2017, a historical marker was erected for the community.

East of Apple Springs, in Trinity County's northeast, African Americans established the freedom colony of Nigton after becoming free. Many continued working as farm laborers, participating in sharecropping or running their own farms or ranches near their previous plantations. African Americans began to acquire more land in the 1880s, and the town started to develop a rich agricultural and civic environment. The well-planned farms, premium cattle, hogs, poultry, produce, and excellent level of living of Nigton were well known. One of the first alumni of Wiley College in Marshall was the progressive politician and landowner Jefferson Calhoun Carter (1855–1936). After he died in 1936, he continued to foster community pride. The Mayo Baptist Church, Pine Grove Colored Methodist Episcopal Church (also known as Ligon Chapel), St. John Union, Masonic Lodge, and several retail establishments and shops were all created by the community. Having been excluded from white festivities, the community organized its own sporting competitions and Juneteenth celebrations, which included baseball, basketball, and neighborhood barbecues.

== Geography ==
Nigton is located at the intersection of Farm to Market Roads 2262 and 2501, 17 miles southwest of Groveton in northeastern Trinity County.

== Education ==
Nigton had its own school in the 1940s. A school named Pine Island School was built on property donated in 1888 as part of the community's commitment to education. In 1927–1928, the neighborhood won a Rosenwald grant for a school and generated more than $5,000 through bonds and donations. With four teachers and a shop space, programs were provided for children in elementary through high school, serving as a county training facility. Professor Wayne Wright Johnson, a renowned educator and researcher, taught there from 1910 to 1950. He died in 1969. He was a botany student at Prairie View A&M College when he graduated, and he later became the principal of the Nigton school. He was dedicated to Nigton's education. Today, the community is served by the Apple Springs Independent School District.

== Notable person ==
Larry Gossett, Democratic politician and activist, was born in Seattle to sharecroppers who moved there from Nigton.
