= South Groveton, Texas =

Town in Texas, US

Coordinates: 31.053°N 95.133°W

South Groveton is a former town on the outskirts of Groveton in Trinity County, Texas, United States. It was incorporated in 1919 by the Trinity County Lumber Company to avoid paying taxes when Groveton was incorporated. The population peaked at 1,000 in 1930 and declined to 175 people by the 1990s.
