= Helmic, Texas =

- Unincorporated community
- Location within Texas Location within the United States
- Coordinates: 31°10′51″N 94°59′12″W
- Country: United States
- State: Texas
- County: Trinity
- Elevation: 308 ft (94 m)
- Time zone: UTC-6 (Central (CST))
  - Summer (DST): UTC-5 (CDT)
- Area codes: 430 & 903
- GNIS feature ID: 1381988

Helmic is a rural community in Trinity County, Texas, United States. According to the Handbook of Texas, the community had a population of 86 in 2000. It is located within the Huntsville, Texas micropolitan area.

== History ==
Helmic was established as a stop on the Groveton, Lufkin and Northern Railway circa 1908. It was originally called Alabama Station, but the name was changed to Helmic in 1910 when the post office was established. It was given the name Helmic for a surveyor/engineer who was in charge of the construction of the track. A camp was established by the Trinity County Lumber Company in 1914 and was officially settled. It then had 50 residents, two grocers, and three general stores that year. A small boom occurred during the 1910s and 1920s and the population jumped to 300. When the lumber company moved its operations to Colmesneil, Helmic started its decline. The lumber camp ended and the railroad tracks were removed. The post office closed in 1933. In the early 1940s, the settlement had a store and 50 residents. In 2000, the population was 86.

== Geography ==
Helmic is located on Farm to Market Road 357, 12 miles northeast of Groveton in eastern Trinity County.

== Education ==
Helmic had its own school in the early 1940s. Today, the community is served by the Centerville Independent School District.
