= Burke Town, Texas =

Ghost town in Texas, US

Burke Town
- Ghost town
- Location within Texas
- Coordinates: 31.28379430°N 95.00771270°W
- Country: United States
- State: Texas
- County: Trinity County
- Named for: Benjamin Burke

Burke Town is a ghost town in Trinity County, Texas, United States. Situated on Farm to Market Road 2501, it was named for Benjamin Burke, the first resident. He and his slaves moved there c. 1859. Some development occurred, but the community was abandoned by the 1930s.
