= Red Branch (disambiguation) =

Red Branch may refer to:

- Red Branch (from the Old Irish Cróeb Ruad, or, Cróeb Derg ) - the name of two royal houses of Ulster
  - Red Branch Cycle (or Ulster Cycle) legends and sagas of heroes of Ulster
- Red Branch, Texas, an unincorporated community in Trinity County, Texas
- Red Branch (novel), (1989), novelisation of the life of the Irish hero Cú Chulainn by the Irish-American author Morgan Llywelyn

== See also ==
- Red Hand of Ulster
- Red-giant branch
