= Possum Walk, Texas =

Town in Texas, US

Coordinates: 31.1922°N 95.1718°W

Crete, also known as East Prairie or Possum Walk, was a farm town 11 miles from Groveton in Trinity County, Texas, United States. The town was established in 1870 and a school was built in 1884. The name was changed to Crete in 1902, though most Possom Walkians refer to the community as Possom Walk. The town was abandoned by 1990, although East Prairie Church of Christ, a very small congregation, remains.
