= Centralia, Texas =

Centralia
- Unincorporated community
- Location within the state of Texas Centralia (the United States)
- Coordinates: 31°15′29″N 95°02′24″W
- Country: United States
- State: Texas
- County: Trinity

Population (2000)
  - Total: 53
- Time zone: UTC-6 (Central (CST))
  - Summer (DST): UTC-5 (CDT)

Centralia is an unincorporated community in Trinity County, Texas, United States. In 2000, the estimated population was 53 residents. It is located within the Huntsville, Texas micropolitan area.

== Historical development ==
The town was originally settled around the time of the Civil War, with the town square being established the following decade. As the town was located between Nogalus Prairie and Apple Springs, it was given the name Centralia. In 1874, the post office was opened and over the next 11 years, the town would grow to have a population of 150 residents, along with the addition of two general stores, several steam sawmills and gristmills, two blacksmiths, and a saloon. As late as 1914, the population would be at its peak at 300. After World War I, businesses would begin to close with the town's population dwindling over the next several decades. In the mid-1930s, the community had a store, a chair factory, and 75 residents. The population was 26 in 1990 and 53 in 2000.

On April 25, 2011, an EF1 tornado struck Centralia. Many trees were downed near Davy Crockett National Forest.

== Geography ==
Centralia is located on Farm to Market Road 357, 15 mi (24 km) northeast of Groveton in northeastern Trinity County.

== Education ==
Centralia had its own school in 1885. Today, the community is served by the Apple Springs Independent School District.

== Notable person ==
David Henry Hamilton, Texas statesman, resided here.
