= Vair (disambiguation) =

Vair is a heraldic tincture.

Vair may also refer to:

- Vair (river), a tributary of the Meuse in Lorraine, France
- Vair, Texas, a town in the United States
- Guillaume du Vair (1556–1621), French author and lawyer
- Steve Vair (1886–1959), Canadian professional ice hockey player
- V Air, a Republic of China's low-cost airline based in Taipei, Taiwan
