= Josserand (surname) =

Josserand is a surname of French origin. It may refer to:

- Arnaud Josserand (born 1963), French male volleyball player
- Marcel Josserand (1900–1992), French mycologist
- Marion Josserand (born 1986), French skier
- Sylvie Josserand (born 1968), French politician

== See also ==
- Josserand, Texas
