= Joe Jackson (offensive lineman) =

American football player (born 1979)

No. 60
- Position: Offensive lineman

Personal information
- Born: May 12, 1979 (age 47); Groveton, Texas, U.S.
- Listed height: 6 ft 2 in (1.88 m)
- Listed weight: 290 lb (132 kg)

Career information
- High school: Groveton
- College: Baylor
- NFL draft: 2002: undrafted

Career history
- Kansas City Chiefs (2002)*; Frankfurt Galaxy (2003); Philadelphia Soul (2004)
- * Offseason or practice squad member only

Career AFL statistics
- Tackles: 5
- Stats at ArenaFan.com

Joe Jackson (born May 12, 1979) is an American former football offensive lineman. He played college football at Baylor University. He was a member of the Kansas City Chiefs of the National Football League (NFL), the Frankfurt Galaxy of NFL Europe, and the Philadelphia Soul of the Arena Football League (AFL).

== Early life ==
Jackson played high school football at Groveton High School in Groveton, Texas. He earned all-state honors as a defensive tackle his senior year after recording 126 tackles, three pass deflections and three fumble recoveries. He also played offensive line.

== College career ==
Jackson played for the Baylor Bears from 1998 to 2001, starting forty games. He was redshirted in 1997.

== Professional career ==
Jackson signed with the Kansas City Chiefs after going undrafted in the 2002 NFL draft. He played for the Frankfurt Galaxy of NFL Europe in 2003.

He was signed by the Philadelphia Soul on December 9, 2003. He was released by the Soul on December 16, 2004.
