= Josserand, Texas =

- Unincorporated community
- Location within Texas Location within the United States
- Coordinates: 31°02′07″N 95°05′23″W
- Country: United States
- State: Texas
- County: Trinity
- Elevation: 315 ft (96 m)

Population (2000)
  - Total: 29
- Time zone: UTC-6 (Central (CST))
  - Summer (DST): UTC-5 (CDT)
- Area code: 936
- GNIS feature ID: 1382095

Josserand is an unincorporated community in Trinity County, Texas, United States. As of 2000, the community had a population of 29. It is located within the Huntsville, Texas micropolitan area.

== History ==
Josserand was founded in 1882 by Peter and Frank Josserand, who established a sawmill in the community. They acquired 60,000 acres (24,000 ha) of virgin forest for lumber between 1880 and 1900, causing the community to rapidly grow. In 1887, a post office opened in the community, and by 1892 Josserand had 550 residents as well as two churches and a store. When Peter Josserand died in 1905, this sparked the community's decline. In 1909, the sawmill ceased operations; the post office closed in 1948. A few scattered houses remained in the early 1990s and the population was reported as 29 in 2000.

== Geography ==
Josserand is located near U.S. Route 287, 3 miles (4.8 km) southeast of Groveton in south-central Trinity County.

== Education ==
Josserand had schools for Black and White students in 1892. The schools were consolidated with Groveton's schools in the 1930s.
