= Trevat, Texas =

Community in Texas, US

Coordinates: 31°07′12″N 94°56′47″W

Trevat was a farming community 12 miles from Groveton in Trinity County, Texas, United States. It was established at approximately the time of the Civil War. There was a post office from 1892 until 1927. The community was deserted by 1990.
