= M&I Bank Border Showdown Series =

- Kansas (2): Missouri (8)
2003–2004; 2005–2006	2002–2003; 2004–2005; 2006–2007; 2007–2008; 2008–2009; 2009–2010; 2010–2011; 2011–2012

The M&I Bank Border Showdown Series is the official name for the Border War rivalry between the University of Kansas Jayhawks and the University of Missouri Tigers.

== Competition format ==
- Team placing the highest in Big 12 Conference or NCAA Championship events will be awarded the points.
- If a contest is cancelled in any way and not rescheduled, the point(s) for that contest will be eliminated. If the event is rescheduled, the point(s) will apply.
- Post-Season Bonus points are only applied if both Kansas and Missouri are competing.
- If two teams tie in any event, the points for that event will be split between the two schools.
- Tie-Breaker: If schools tie in final total, following tie-breaker will be put into place: The school who was victorious in a majority of the head-to-head regular-season games will be declared the Border Showdown Champion. (Sports included: Volleyball, Soccer, Football, Men's and Women's Basketball, Baseball, Softball - 13 total games eligible).

== History ==
The M&I Bank Border Showdown Series dates back to 2002. Missouri currently has an advantage in the series with a 7-2 lead in titles. Missouri leads the all-time series with a 208-149 point advantage as of the end of the 2010-2011 school year.

=== 2002–2003 ===
Kansas victories are shaded ██ blue. Missouri victories shaded in ██ gold.

Date	Site	Sport	Winning team	Series
October 19, 2002	Columbia	Volleyball	Missouri	Missouri 1.5–0.0
October 26, 2002	Columbia	Football	Missouri	Missouri 4.5–0.0
November 1, 2002	Columbia	Women's Soccer	Missouri	Missouri 7.5–0.0
November 1, 2002	Columbia	Women's Swimming	Missouri	Missouri 9.0–0.0
November 2, 2002	Columbia	Men's Cross Country	Kansas	Missouri 9.0–1.0
November 2, 2002	Columbia	Women's Cross Country	Missouri	Missouri 10.0–1.0
November 23, 2002	Lawrence	Volleyball	Missouri	Missouri 11.5–1.0
February 3, 2003	Lawrence	Men's Basketball	Kansas	Missouri 11.5–2.5
February 15, 2003	Lawrence	Women's Basketball	Missouri	Missouri 13.0–2.5
February 19–22, 2003	Austin	Women's Swimming	Missouri	Missouri 14.5–2.5
February 28-March 1, 2003	Lincoln	Men's Indoor Track & Field	Missouri	Missouri 15.5–2.5
February 28-March 1, 2003	Lincoln	Women's Indoor Track & Field	Kansas	Missouri 15.5–3.5
March 1, 2003	Columbia	Women's Basketball	Missouri	Missouri 17.0–3.5
March 9, 2003	Columbia	Men's Basketball	Kansas	Missouri 17.0–5.0
March 9, 2003	Columbia	Women's Tennis	Missouri	Missouri 20.0–5.0
March 15, 2003	Dallas	Men's Basketball	Missouri	Missouri 20.5–5.0
March 21, 2003	Columbia	Baseball	Missouri	Missouri 21.5–5.0
March 22, 2003	Columbia	Baseball	Missouri	Missouri 22.5–5.0
March 23, 2003	Columbia	Baseball	Missouri	Missouri 23.5–5.0
April 21, 2003	Lawrence	Softball	Missouri	Missouri 25.0–5.0
April 21, 2003	Lawrence	Softball	Missouri	Missouri 26.5–5.0
April 22–24, 2003	Columbia	Women's Golf	Missouri	Missouri 29.5–5.0
April 29-May 1, 2003	Tulsa	Men's Golf	Kansas	Missouri 29.5–8.0
May 17–19, 2003	Austin	Women's Outdoor Track & Field	Missouri	Missouri 30.5–8.0
May 17–19, 2003	Austin	Men's Outdoor Track & Field	Missouri	Missouri 31.5–8.0
May 19–21, 2003	Manhattan	Men's Golf	Kansas	Missouri 31.5–8.5
May 22, 2003	Oklahoma City	Baseball	Missouri	Missouri 32.0–8.5

=== 2003–2004 ===
Kansas victories are shaded ██ blue. Missouri victories shaded in ██ gold.

Date	Site	Sport	Winning team	Series
September 27, 2003	Lawrence	Football	Kansas	Kansas 3.0–0.0
October 1, 2003	Columbia	Volleyball	Missouri	Kansas 3.0–1.5
October 12, 2003	Columbia	Women's Soccer	Kansas	Kansas 6.0–1.5
October 31, 2003	Austin	Women's Cross Country	Missouri	Kansas 6.0–2.5
October 31, 2003	Austin	Men's Cross Country	Kansas	Kansas 7.0–2.5
November 1, 2003	Lawrence	Women's Swimming	Missouri	Kansas 7.0–4.0
November 5, 2003	Lawrence	Volleyball	Kansas	Kansas 8.5–4.0
November 16, 2003	Columbia	Women's Soccer Second Round	Kansas	Kansas 9.0–4.0
January 10, 2004	Columbia	Women's Basketball	Kansas	Kansas 10.5–4.0
January 24, 2004	Lawrence	Women's Basketball	Missouri	Kansas 10.5–5.5
February 2, 2004	Lawrence	Men's Basketball	Kansas	Kansas 12.0–5.5
February 25–28, 2004	Austin	Women's Swimming	Kansas	Kansas 13.5–5.5
February 27–28, 2004	Lincoln	Men's Indoor Track & Field	Kansas	Kansas 14.5–5.5
February 27–28, 2004	Lincoln	Women's Indoor Track & Field	Missouri	Kansas 14.5–6.5
March 7, 2004	Columbia	Men's Basketball	Kansas	Kansas 16.0–6.5
March 11–14, 2004	Dallas	Men's Basketball	Kansas	Kansas 16.5–6.5
April 7, 2004	Columbia	Softball	Missouri	Kansas 16.5–8.0
April 14, 2004	Lawrence	Softball	Missouri	Kansas 16.5–9.5
April 18, 2004	Lawrence	Women's Tennis	Missouri	Kansas 16.5–12.5
April 23–25, 2004	College Station	Women's Golf	Missouri	Kansas 16.5–15.5
April 26–27, 2004	Hutchinson	Men's Golf	Kansas	Kansas 19.5–15.5
April 29-May 1, 2004	Norman	Women's Outdoor Track & Field	Missouri	Kansas 19.5–16.5
April 29-May 1, 2004	Norman	Men's Outdoor Track & Field	Missouri	Kansas 19.5–17.5
May 14, 2004	Lawrence	Baseball	Kansas	Kansas 20.5–17.5
May 15, 2004	Lawrence	Baseball	Missouri	Kansas 20.5–18.5
May 16, 2004	Lawrence	Baseball	Kansas	Kansas 21.5–18.5

=== 2004–2005 ===
Kansas victories are shaded ██ blue. Missouri victories shaded in ██ gold.

=== 2005–2006 ===
Kansas victories are shaded ██ blue. Missouri victories shaded in ██ gold.

Date	Site	Sport	Winning team	Series
October 15, 2005	Columbia	Volleyball	Missouri	Missouri 1.5–0.0
October 28, 2005	Lawrence	Women's Soccer	Kansas	Kansas 3.0–1.5
October 28, 2005	Waco	Women's Cross Country	Missouri	Kansas 3.0–2.5
October 28, 2005	Waco	Men's Cross Country	Kansas	Kansas 4.0–2.5
October 28, 2005	Lawrence	Women's Swimming & Diving	Kansas	Kansas 5.5–2.5
October 29, 2005	Lawrence	Football	Kansas	Kansas 8.5–2.5
November 23, 2005	Lawrence	Volleyball	Missouri	Kansas 8.5–4.0
January 16, 2006	Columbia	Men's Basketball	Missouri	Kansas 8.5–5.5
February 11, 2006	Columbia	Women's Basketball	Missouri	Kansas 8.5–7.0
February 18, 2006	Lawrence	Men's Basketball	Kansas	Kansas 10.0–7.0
February 22, 2006	Columbia	Women's Swimming & Diving	Missouri	Kansas 10.0–8.5
February 25, 2006	Lawrence	Women's Basketball	Kansas	Kansas 11.5–8.5
February 25, 2006	Lincoln	Men's Indoor Track & Field	Kansas	Kansas 12.5–8.5
February 25, 2006	Lincoln	Women's Indoor Track & Field	Missouri	Kansas 12.5–9.5
March 31, 2006	Lawrence	Baseball	Missouri	Kansas 12.5–10.5
April 1, 2006	Lawrence	Baseball	Kansas	Kansas 13.5–10.5
April 2, 2006	Lawrence	Baseball	Kansas	Kansas 14.5–10.5
April 8, 2006	Lawrence	Women's Tennis	Kansas	Kansas 17.5–10.5
April 12, 2006	Columbia	Softball	Missouri	Kansas 17.5–12.0
April 19, 2006	Lincoln	Women's Golf	Missouri	Kansas 17.5–15.0
April 19, 2006	Lawrence	Softball	Kansas	Kansas 19.0–15.0
April 22–24, 2006	Tulsa	Men's Golf	Kansas	Kansas 22.0–15.0
May 11, 2006	Oklahoma City	Softball	Kansas	Kansas 22.5–15.0
May 12, 2006	Norman	Women's Outdoor Track & Field	Missouri	Kansas 22.5–16.0
May 12, 2006	Norman	Men's Outdoor Track & Field	Missouri	Kansas 22.5–17.0
May 27, 2006	Oklahoma City	Baseball	Kansas	Kansas 23.0–17.0

=== 2006–2007 ===
Kansas victories are shaded ██ blue. Missouri victories shaded in ██ gold.

Date	Site	Sport	Winning team	Series
October 4, 2006	Columbia	Volleyball	Missouri	Missouri 1.5–0.0
October 15, 2006	Columbia	Women's Soccer	Kansas	Kansas 3.0–1.5
October 27, 2006	Lawrence	Women's Cross Country	Missouri	Kansas 3.0–2.5
October 27, 2006	Lawrence	Men's Cross Country	Kansas	Kansas 4.0–2.5
October 27, 2006	Columbia	Women's Swimming	Missouri	Tie 4.0–4.0
November 18, 2006	Lawrence	Volleyball	Missouri	Missouri 5.5–4.0
November 25, 2006	Columbia	Football	Missouri	Missouri 8.5–4.0
January 15, 2007	Lawrence	Men's Basketball	Kansas	Missouri 8.5–5.5
February 10, 2007	Columbia	Men's Basketball	Kansas	Missouri 8.5–7.0
February 14, 2007	Lawrence	Women's Basketball	Missouri	Missouri 10.0–7.0
February 17, 2007	College Station	Women's Swimming & Diving	Kansas	Missouri 10.0–8.5
February 24, 2007	Ames	Men's Indoor Track & Field	Missouri	Missouri 11.0–8.5
February 24, 2007	Ames	Women's Indoor Track & Field	Kansas	Missouri 11.0–9.5
March 1, 2007	Columbia	Women's Basketball	Kansas	Tie 11.0–11.0
March 30, 2007	Columbia	Baseball	Kansas	Kansas 12.0–11.0
March 31, 2007	Columbia	Baseball	Missouri	Tie 12.0–12.0
April 1, 2007	Columbia	Baseball	Missouri	Missouri 13.0–12.0
April 7, 2007	Columbia	Women's Tennis	Missouri	Missouri 16.0–12.0
April 18, 2007	Waco	Women's Golf	Missouri	Missouri 19.0–12.0
April 18, 2007	Lawrence	Softball	Missouri	Missouri 20.5–12.0
April 18, 2007	Lawrence	Softball	Missouri	Missouri 22.0–12.0
April 24, 2007	Hutchinson	Men's Golf	Missouri	Missouri 25.0–12.0
May 13, 2007	Lincoln	Women's Outdoor Track & Field	Kansas	Missouri 25.0–13.0
May 13, 2007	Lincoln	Men's Outdoor Track & Field	Kansas	Missouri 25.0–14.0

=== 2007–2008 ===
Kansas victories are shaded ██ blue. Missouri victories shaded in ██ gold.

Date	Site	Sport	Winning team	Series
September 19, 2007	Columbia	Volleyball	Kansas	Kansas 1.5–0.0
October 26, 2007	Lubbock	Men's Cross Country	Missouri	Kansas 1.5–1.0
October 26, 2007	Lubbock	Women's Cross Country	Missouri	Missouri 2.0–1.5
October 26, 2007	Lawrence	Women's Swimming	Missouri	Missouri 3.5–1.5
October 27, 2007	Lawrence	Volleyball	Missouri	Missouri 5.0–1.5
November 2, 2007	Lawrence	Women's Soccer	Kansas	Missouri 5.0–4.5
November 24, 2007	Kansas City	Football	Missouri	Missouri 8.0–4.5
January 19, 2008	Lawrence	Women's Basketball	Kansas	Missouri 8.0–6.0
January 19, 2008	Columbia	Men's Basketball	Kansas	Missouri 8.0–7.5
February 4, 2008	Lawrence	Men's Basketball	Kansas	Kansas 9.0–8.0
February 24, 2008	Columbia	Women's Basketball	Missouri	Missouri 9.5–9.0
March 1, 2008	Austin	Women's Swimming	Missouri	Missouri 11.0–9.0
March 1, 2008	Lincoln	Men's Indoor Track & Field	Missouri	Missouri 12.0–9.0
March 1, 2008	Lincoln	Women's Indoor Track & Field	Kansas	Missouri 12.0–10.0
MArch 16, 2008	Columbia	Women's Tennis	Missouri	Missouri 15.0–10.0
April 16, 2008	Columbia	Softball	Missouri	Missouri 16.5–10.0
April 16, 2008	Columbia	Softball	Missouri	Missouri 18.0–10.0
April 27, 2008	Stillwater	Women's Golf	Missouri	Missouri 21.0–10.0
April 27, 2008	Trinity	Men's Golf	Kansas	Missouri 21.0–13.0
May 9, 2008	Lawrence	Baseball	Missouri	Missouri 22.0–13.0
May 11, 2008	Lawrence	Baseball	Kansas	Missouri 22.0–14.0
May 11, 2008	Lawrence	Baseball	Missouri	Missouri 23.0–14.0
May 18, 2008	Boulder	Women's Outdoor Track & Field	Kansas	Missouri 23.0–15.0
May 18, 2008	Boulder	Men's Outdoor Track & Field	Missouri	Missouri 24.0–15.0

=== 2008–2009 ===
Kansas victories are shaded ██ blue. Missouri victories shaded in ██ gold.

Date	Site	Sport	Winning team	Series
October 15, 2008	Columbia	Volleyball	Missouri	Missouri 1.5–0.0
October 29, 2008	Lawrence	Volleyball	Kansas	Tied 1.5–1.5
October 31, 2008	Columbia	Women's Soccer	Missouri	Missouri 4.5–1.5
November 1, 2008	Columbia	Women's Swimming & Diving	Missouri	Missouri 6.0–1.5
November 1, 2008	Ames	Women's Cross Country	Kansas	Missouri 6.0–2.5
November 1, 2008	Ames	Men's Cross Country	Missouri	Missouri 7.0–2.5
November 7, 2008	San Antonio	Women's Soccer	Missouri	Missouri 7.5–2.5
November 29, 2008	Kansas City	Football	Kansas	Missouri 7.5–5.5
January 14, 2009	Lawrence	Women's Basketball	Kansas	Missouri 7.5–7.0
February 7, 2009	Columbia	Women's Basketball	Missouri	Missouri 9.0–7.0
February 9, 2009	Columbia	Men's Basketball	Missouri	Missouri 10.5–7.0
February 25–28, 2009	Columbia	Women's Swimming & Diving	Missouri	Missouri 12.0–7.0
February 27–28, 2009	College Station	Men's Indoor Track & Field	Missouri	Missouri 13.0–7.0
February 27–28, 2009	College Station	Women's Indoor Track & Field	Missouri	Missouri 14.0–7.0
March 1, 2009	Lawrence	Men's Basketball	Kansas	Missouri 14.0–8.5
March 22, 2009	Lawrence	Tennis	Missouri	Missouri 17.0–8.5
April 1, 2009	Lawrence	Softball	Missouri	Missouri 18.5–8.5
April 1, 2009	Lawrence	Softball	Kansas	Missouri 18.5–10.0
April 23–26, 2009	Norman	Tennis	Missouri	Missouri 19.0–10.0
April 24–26, 2009	Lubbock	Women's Golf	Kansas	Missouri 19.0–13.0
April 27–29, 2009	Hutchinson	Men's Golf	Kansas	Missouri 19.0–16.0
May 8, 2009	Columbia	Baseball	Missouri	Missouri 20.0–16.0
May 9, 2009	Columbia	Baseball	Kansas	Missouri 20.0–17.0
May 10, 2009	Columbia	Baseball	Missouri	Missouri 21.0–17.0
May 15–17, 2009	Lubbock	Men's Outdoor Track & Field	Missouri	Missouri 22.0–17.0
May 15–17, 2009	Lubbock	Women's Outdoor Track & Field	Missouri	Missouri 23.0–17.0

=== 2009–2010 ===
Kansas victories are shaded ██ blue. Missouri victories shaded in ██ gold.

Date	Site	Sport	Winning team	Series
September 16, 2009	Columbia	Volleyball	Missouri	Missouri 1.5–0.0
October 24, 2009	Lawrence	Volleyball	Missouri	Missouri 3.0–0.0
October 30, 2009	Lawrence	Women's Soccer	Kansas	Tie 3.0–3.0
October 30, 2009	Lawrence	Women's Swimming	Missouri	Missouri 4.5–3.0
October 31, 2009	Columbia	Women's Cross Country	Tie	Missouri 5.0–3.5
October 31, 2009	Columbia	Men's Cross Country	Kansas	Missouri 5.0–4.5
November 4, 2009	San Antonio	Women's Soccer	Missouri	Missouri 5.5–4.5
November 28, 2009	Kansas City	Football	Missouri	Missouri 8.5–4.5
January 17, 2010	Lawrence	Women's Basketball	Kansas	Missouri 8.5–6.0
January 25, 2010	Lawrence	Men's Basketball	Kansas	Missouri 8.5–7.5
January 30, 2010	Columbia	Women's Basketball	Kansas	Kansas 9.0–8.5
February 27, 2010	College Station	Women's Swimming	Missouri	Missouri 10.0–9.0
February 27, 2010	Ames	Men's Indoor Track & Field	Missouri	Missouri 11.0–9.0
February 27, 2010	Ames	Women's Indoor Track & Field	Kansas	Missouri 11.0–10.0
March 6, 2010	Columbia	Men's Basketball	Kansas	Kansas 11.5–11.0
April 7, 2010	Columbia	Softball	Missouri	Missouri 12.5–11.5
April 7, 2010	Columbia	Softball	Missouri	Missouri 14.0–11.5
April 9, 2010	Columbia	Women's Tennis	Missouri	Missouri 17.0–11.5
April 25, 2010	Trinity	Men's Golf	Missouri	Missouri 20.0–11.5
April 25, 2010	Norman	Women's Golf	Missouri	Missouri 23.0–11.5
May 7, 2010	Lawrence	Baseball	Kansas	Missouri 23.0–12.5
May 8, 2010	Lawrence	Baseball	Kansas	Missouri 23.0–13.5
May 9, 2010	Lawrence	Baseball	Kansas	Missouri 23.0–14.5
May 16, 2010	Columbia	Men's Outdoor Track & Field	Kansas	Missouri 23.0–15.5
May 16, 2010	Columbia	Men's Outdoor Track & Field	Kansas	Missouri 23.0–16.5

=== 2010–2011 ===
Kansas victories are shaded ██ blue. Missouri victories shaded in ██ gold.

Date	Site	Sport	Winning team	Series
September 24, 2010	Columbia, MO	Women's Soccer	Missouri	Missouri 3.0–0.0
September 29, 2010	Lawrence, KS	Volleyball	Kansas	Missouri 3.0–1.5
October 27, 2010	Columbia, MO	Volleyball	Missouri	Missouri 4.5–1.5
October 29, 2010	Columbia, MO	Women' Swimming	Missouri	Missouri 6.0–1.5
October 30, 2010	Stillwater, OK	Men's Cross Country Big 12CC	Kansas	Missouri 6.0–2.5
October 30, 2010	Stillwater, OK	Women's Cross Country Big 12CC	Kansas	Missouri 6.0–3.5
November 27, 2010	Kansas City, MO	Football	Missouri	Missouri 9.0–3.5
January 26, 2011	Columbia, MO	Women's Basketball	Missouri	Missouri 10.5–3.5
February 7, 2011	Lawrence, KS	Men's Basketball	Kansas	Missouri 10.5–5.0
February 19, 2011	Lawrence, KS	Women's Basketball	Kansas	Missouri 10.5–6.5
February 26, 2011	College Station, TX	Women's Swimming Big 12CC	Missouri	Missouri 12.0–6.5
February 26, 2011	Lincoln, NE	Men's Indoor Track & Field Big 12CC	Missouri	Missouri 13.0–6.5
February 26, 2011	Lincoln, NE	Women's Indoor Track & Field Big 12CC	Kansas	Missouri 13.0–7.5
March 5, 2011	Columbia, MO	Men's Basketball	Kansas	Missouri 13.0–9.0
March 23, 2011	Lawrence, KS	Softball	Missouri	Missouri 14.5–9.0
March 23, 2011	Lawrence, KS	Softball	Missouri	Missouri 16.0–9.0
April 8, 2011	Lawrence, KS	Women's Tennis	Kansas	Missouri 16.0–12.0
April 15, 2011	Columbia, MO	Baseball	Kansas	Missouri 16.0–13.0
April 16, 2011	Columbia, MO	Baseball	Missouri	Missouri 17.0–13.0
April 17, 2011	Columbia, MO	Baseball	Kansas	Missouri 17.0–14.0
April 24, 2011	Columbia, MO	Women's Golf Big 12CC	Missouri	Missouri 20.0–14.0
April 27, 2011	Hutchinson, KS	Men's Golf Big 12CC	Missouri	Missouri 23.0–14.0
May 15, 2011	Norman, OK	Men's Outdoor Track & Field Big 12CC	Kansas	Missouri 23.0–15.0
May 15, 2011	Norman, OK	Women's Outdoor Track & Field Big 12CC	Kansas	Missouri 23.0–16.0

=== 2011–2012 ===
Kansas victories are shaded ██ blue. Missouri victories shaded in ██ gold.

Date	Site	Sport	Winning team	Series
October 12, 2011	Columbia	Volleyball	Missouri	Missouri 1.5–0.0
October 21, 2011	Columbia	Soccer	Missouri	Missouri 4.5–0.0
October 29, 2011	College Station	Men's Cross Country	Missouri	Missouri 5.5–0.0
October 29, 2011	College Station	Women's Cross Country	Missouri	Missouri 6.5–0.0
November 2, 2011	Lawrence	Volleyball	Missouri	Missouri 8.0–0.0
November 11, 2011	Lawrence	Women's Swimming & Diving	Missouri	Missouri 9.5–0.0
November 26, 2011	Kansas City	Football	Missouri	Missouri 12.5–0.0
January 15, 2012	Columbia	Women's Basketball	Kansas	Missouri 12.5–1.5
February 4, 2012	Columbia	Men's Basketball	Missouri	Missouri 14.0–1.5
February 18, 2012	Lawrence	Women's Basketball	Missouri	Missouri 15.5–1.5
February 22–25, 2012	Columbia	Women's Swimming & Diving	Missouri	Missouri 17.0–1.5
February 24–25, 2012	College Station	Men's Indoor Track & Field	Missouri	Missouri 18.0–1.5
February 24–25, 2012	College Station	Women's Indoor Track & Field	Kansas	Missouri 18.0–2.5
February 25, 2012	Lawrence	Men's Basketball	Kansas	Missouri 18.0–4.0
March 16, 2012	Columbia	Softball	Missouri	Missouri 19.0–4.0
March 18, 2012	Columbia	Softball	Missouri	Missouri 20.0–4.0
March 18, 2012	Columbia	Softball	Missouri	Missouri 21.0–4.0
April 13, 2012	Columbia	Tennis	Missouri	Missouri 24.0–4.0
April 27–29, 2012	Trinity	Men's Golf	Missouri	Missouri 27.0–4.0
April 27–29, 2012	Lawrence	Women's Golf	Missouri	Missouri 30.0–4.0
May 11–13, 2012	Manhattan	Men's Outdoor Track & Field	Kansas	Missouri 30.0–5.0
May 11–13, 2012	Manhattan	Women's Outdoor Track & Field	Kansas	Missouri 30.0–6.0
May 17, 2012	Lawrence	Baseball	Kansas	Missouri 30.0–7.0
May 18, 2012	Lawrence	Baseball	Kansas	Missouri 30.0–8.0
May 19, 2012	Lawrence	Baseball	Missouri	Missouri 31–8.0
May 26, 2012	Oklahoma City	Baseball	Missouri	Missouri 31.5–8.0
