= Sulphur, Trinity County, Texas =

Sulphur, Texas
- Unincorporated community
- Location within Texas Location within the United States
- Coordinates: 31°03′33″N 94°58′39″W
- Country: United States
- State: Texas
- County: Trinity
- Elevation: 239 ft (73 m)
- Time zone: UTC-6 (Central (CST))
  - Summer (DST): UTC-5 (CDT)
- Area code: 936
- GNIS feature ID: 1380624

Sulphur is an unincorporated community in Trinity County, Texas, United States. Sulphur is 8.8 miles (14.2 km) east of Groveton.
