= Saron, Texas =

Saron
- Unincorporated community
- Location within the state of Texas Saron (the United States)
- Coordinates: 31°02′09″N 95°15′51″W
- Country: United States
- State: Texas
- County: Trinity
- Time zone: UTC-6 (Central (CST))
  - Summer (DST): UTC-5 (CDT)

Saron was a sawmill town in Trinity County, Texas, United States. It was located on Texas Highway 94, about 8 miles from Groveton. Now a farming community, its estimated population in 2018 was 5.
