= Ernestine Glossbrenner =

American politician (1932–2012)

Ernestine”Ernie” Viola Glossbrenner (November 1, 1932 – May 20, 2012) was an American educator and politician. She represented District 58 from 1977 to 1983 and District 44 from 1983 to 1993 in the Texas House of Representatives as a Democrat.

She was born in Troup, grew up in Carlisle and was educated at Kilgore Junior College, going on to earn a BA in chemistry from the University of Texas at Austin and a master's in mathematics from Texas A & I. Glossbrenner then taught high school mathematics in Alice. AKA Miss Glossbrenner to her students, Ernie was a member of First Christian Church of Alice(Disciples of Christ) and the Christian Youth Fellowship(CYF) director in 1971 - 1972.

She ran unsuccessfully to become a state representative in 1974 before being elected in 1976, when she retired from teaching. Glossbrenner helped bring the first true secret ballot voting to Texas, removing the requirement for voters to sign their ballots. She also contributed to legislation on worker safety and was known as an important advocate for public education, serving as head of the Public Education Committee.

She was a founding member of the Texas Women's Political Caucus and served as president of the Texas chapter of the National Women's Political Caucus. She served on the Texas Ethics Commission in 2001.

In 1974, she was named Woman of the Year by the Texas Women's Political Caucus. She received the Distinguished Alumnus Award in 1990 from the University of Texas at Austin and the Friend of Education Award in 1991 from the Texas Classroom Teachers Association. Glossbrenner was inducted into the Texas Women's Hall of Fame in 1984.

She died in Corpus Christi at the age of 79.
