= Barnes Switch, Texas =

Barnes Switch
- Unincorporated community
- Location within the state of Texas Barnes Switch (the United States)
- Coordinates: 30°59′59.8″N 95°25′27.3″W
- Country: United States
- State: Texas
- County: Trinity
- Elevation: 252 ft (77 m)
- Time zone: UTC-6 (Central (CST))
  - Summer (DST): UTC-5 (CDT)

Barnes Switch (also known as Barnes) is an unincorporated community in Trinity County, Texas, United States. The community is located at the junction of Texas State Highway 19 and Farm to Market Road 1893. Barnes Switch was formed around a railroad switch on the Waco, Beaumont, Trinity, and Sabine Railway and was named for the physician S. E. Barnes. As of the early 1990s, it had a population of 15.

Samuel E. Barnes attained a notable record as a merchant, cotton factor, banker, real estate broker, and churchman. His parents, Mississippi natives Jacob Pope Barnes and Elizabeth Ann Rankin, moved to Texas in 1866 and came to Trinity in 1872. Jacob opened a mercantile store in partnership with Frank Lister and was serving as county treasurer at the time of his death. Widowed at age 43, Elizabeth reared nine children and operated the mercantile store with the help of her eldest son, Samuel Edward (1861–1914).

== See also ==
- Texas
- Trinity County, Texas
- Trinity County California
