= Sumpter, Texas =

Former US town

Coordinates: 31°02′12″N 95°03′14″W

Sumpter is a former town in central Trinity County, Texas, United States. Burials in the cemetery date from 1840. It was laid out November 20, 1855 and incorporated in 1862. In 1872, the Sumpter courthouse and records were destroyed by fire.

Sumpter was the original county seat of Trinity County. After the 1872 fire, the town of Trinity was designated as the new county seat, and Sumpter was gradually abandoned.

== See also ==
- List of ghost towns in Texas
