= Red Branch, Texas =

Unincorporated community in Texas, US

Coordinates: 31°04′06″N 95°24′22″W

Red Branch is an unincorporated community in Trinity County, Texas, United States, near the Houston County line. Red Branch is located on Texas State Highway 19 16 miles (26 km) west of Groveton. Red Branch had a school, which opened before 1896, and was consolidated in 1938. By the 1990s, all that remained of the community were some dispersed homes.
