= Groveton High School (Texas) =

Location
- P.O. Box 700; Groveton, Texas 75845; United States; 31.0585°N 95.1256°W

Information
- School type: Public high school
- School district: Groveton Independent School District
- Principal: Bryan Finch
- Staff: 37.82 (FTE)
- Grades: 6-12
- Enrollment: 421 (2023–2024)
- Student to teacher ratio: 11.13
- Colors: Red & white
- Athletics conference: UIL Class AA
- Mascot: Indian
- Website: Groveton High School

Groveton High School is a public high school located in the city of Groveton, Texas, United States, and classified as a 2A school by the University Interscholastic League (UIL). It is a part of the Groveton Independent School District located in central Trinity County. In 2015, the school was rated "Met Standard" by the Texas Education Agency.

== Athletics ==
The Groveton Indians compete in volleyball, cross country, American football, basketball, track, baseball and softball.

=== State titles ===
- American football –
  - 1984 (2A), 1989 (2A), 1990 (2A)

=== State finalist ===
- American football –
  - 1983 (2A), 1985 (2A), 1996 (2A)

== Notable alumni ==
- Rodney Dejuane Thomas (March 30, 1973 – June 14, 2014) was a professional American football player who played running back for seven seasons for the Houston Oilers/Tennessee Titans, and Atlanta Falcons
- Lane Johnson (May 8, 1990) is a professional American football player with the Philadelphia Eagles.
- Joe Jackson, American football player
- Cody Johnson- Texas Country Music Artist
