= Rodney Thomas =

American football player (1973–2014)

No. 20, 22
- Position: Running back

Personal information
- Born: March 30, 1973; Trinity, Texas, U.S.
- Died: June 14, 2014 (aged 41); Groveton, Texas, U.S.
- Listed height: 5 ft 10 in (1.78 m)
- Listed weight: 210 lb (95 kg)

Career information
- High school: Groveton
- College: Texas A&M
- NFL draft: 1995: 3rd round, 89th overall pick

Career history
- Houston Oilers/Tennessee Titans (1995–2000); Atlanta Falcons (2001)

Awards and highlights
- 2× First-team All-SWC (1993, 1994)

Career NFL statistics
- Rushing yards: 1,973
- Rushing average: 3.7
- Rushing touchdowns: 12
- Receptions: 91
- Receiving yards: 631
- Receiving touchdowns: 3
- Stats at Pro Football Reference

Rodney Dejuane Thomas (March 30, 1973 – June 14, 2014) was an American professional football player who was a running back for seven seasons for the Houston Oilers/Tennessee Titans and Atlanta Falcons of the National Football League (NFL). He played college football for the Texas A&M Aggies and was selected by the Oilers in the third round of the 1995 NFL draft. Thomas was the cousin of former NFL safety Terrence Kiel.

== Early life and education ==
Born in Trinity, Texas, on March 30, 1973, Thomas attended Groveton High School in Groveton, Texas. He enjoyed a record-breaking career at Groveton, leading the Indians to two Class 2A state titles, while gaining 8,441 yards (third best in national high school history at the time, currently third best in state history behind Ken Hall and Wes Danaher) and scoring 115 touchdowns. As a senior at Groveton, Thomas rushed for an incredible 3,701 yards (second best in state history). He was the first Texas running back to rush for 100 yards in all 16 games (the most a Texas high school can play during the season), accomplished in 1990.

The highly recruited Thomas chose to attend Texas A&M University after high school. He rushed for almost 300 yards as a freshman with the Aggies and then compiled very consistent rushing totals his final three years in College Station: 856, 996, and 868 yards and became only the fourth Aggie to rush from more than 3,000 career yards. He was a two-time, consensus All-Southwest Conference selection and his 45 career touchdowns tied Darren Lewis for the most in Texas A&M history.

During Thomas' career at A&M, the Aggies led the Southwest Conference in rushing four consecutive seasons as Thomas formed a powerful combination with future NFL backs Greg Hill and Leeland McElroy. Thomas' teams also established school records for most points in a season twice and never lost a game at Kyle Field and never lost to a conference opponent (28–0–1). He is Texas A&M's 4th all-time leading rusher and is 2nd all-time in rushing touchdowns.

Thomas is remembered by many Aggie fans as much for what he did off the field as for what he did on it. He was an active member of service organization Aggie Athletes Involved, and was awarded the Southwest Conference American Airlines Spirit Award. He was honored by his teammates as the 1994 winner of the Aggie Heart Award, the highest honor for a Texas A&M senior football player. The Heart Award is presented to a senior who has completed his eligibility and displays the following intangibles: effort, desire, determination, competitiveness, leadership, and courage. The award is voted upon by the entire team.

Thomas was also well known by fellow students for an incident in Cain Hall, the then athletic dormitory at Texas A&M. When a malfunction in a soft drink machine resulted in cans being dispensed without change being inserted into the machine, Thomas decided to intervene. Although he came from relatively modest means, he took his own change and reimbursed the machine for all of the drinks that had been taken.

== Professional career ==
Thomas was selected by the Houston Oilers in the third round (89th pick overall) of the 1995 NFL draft. As a rookie, he was one of only 19 players in the AFC to finish with 1,000 or more combined yards from scrimmage (1,151 total – 947 rushing and 204 receiving). Thomas' rushing total was, at the time, second only to Earl Campbell in Oiler historical top rookie rushing totals.

In spite of his stellar rookie campaign, Thomas was relegated to backup and special teams roles the following season when the Oilers selected 1995 Heisman Trophy winner Eddie George as their No. 1 pick in the draft. In 1996, Thomas carried just 49 times for 151 yards. And in 1997, he gained 310 rushing yards on 67 carries. In 1998 his total continued to decline (just 24 carries for 100 yards) as George became a star in the league, leaving little playing time for Thomas. In spite of this, Thomas continued to be a team player, thriving in his role and never showing public displeasure, staying with the Oilers as they moved to Tennessee and turning down offers from other teams that would have been more lucrative and where he could have come out of George's shadow. He spent two more seasons with the Tennessee Titans, playing a backup role on the field, but providing leadership both on and off the field with his unparalleled work ethic and outstanding character. In 1999, the Titans made it to Super Bowl XXXIV in which Thomas appeared as a substitute, however they lost to the Kurt Warner-led St. Louis Rams.

He signed as a free agent with the Atlanta Falcons in 2001. He played in 12 games for the Falcons that year, and finished with 37 carries for 126 yards and caught two passes for 26 yards. For his career, Thomas played in 103 games and rushed 532 times for 1,973 yards and 12 touchdowns. Thomas was waived by the Falcons before the 2002 preseason and subsequently retired from football.

== Death ==
Thomas died on June 14, 2014, in Groveton, Texas, at the age of 41 from a heart attack. Thomas was survived by his wife Leigh, 4-year-old son Ian Rodney Thomas, and a teenage stepson, Jalen David Brown.
