= Vair, Texas =

Town in Texas, US

Coordinates: 31°16′52″N 94°54′49″W

Vair is a town in Trinity County, Texas, United States, located on Highway 94. It was established sometime after 1900.
