= Haskell, Texas =

- City
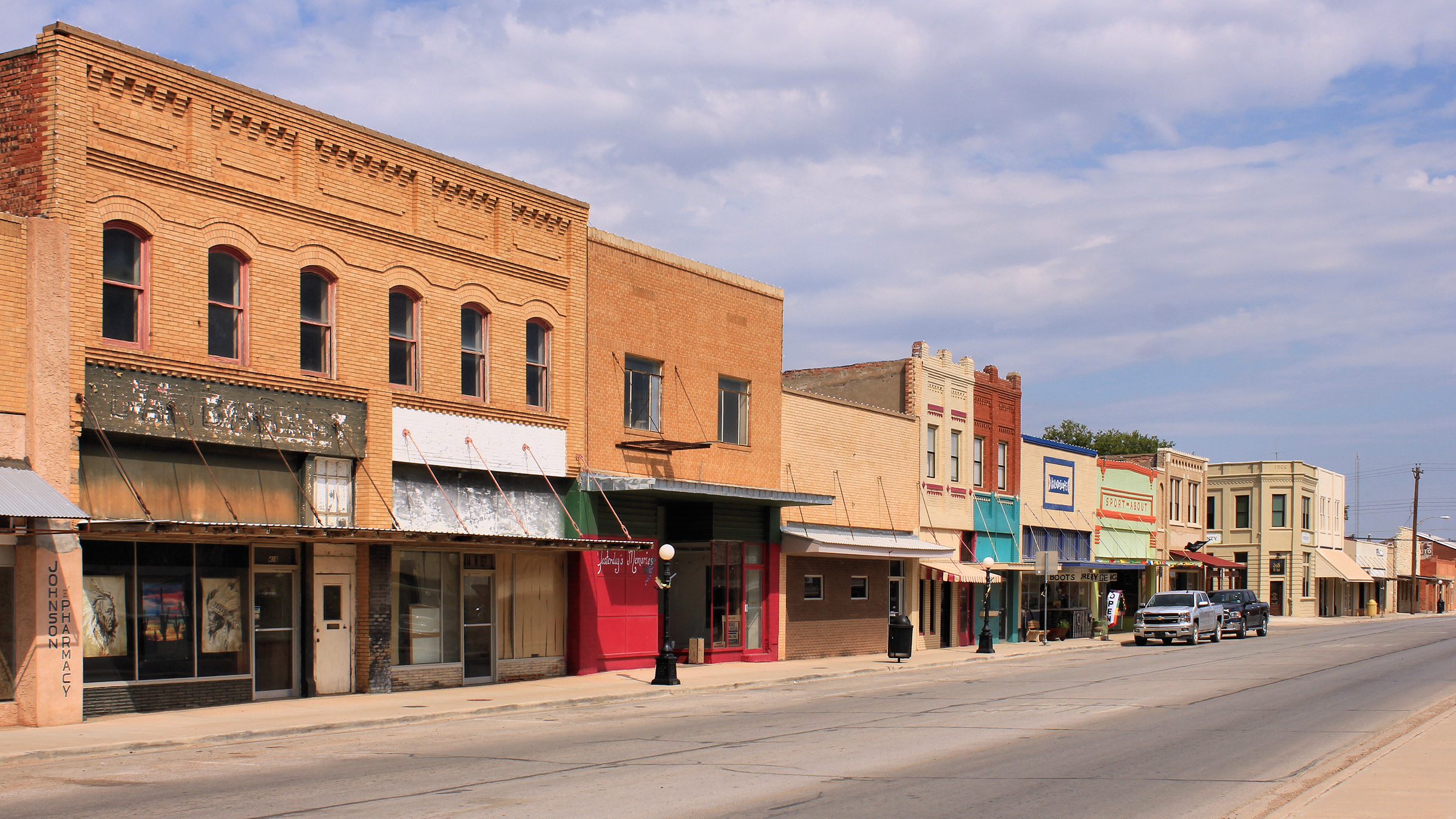
- Downtown Haskell

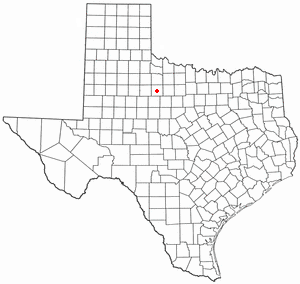
- Location of Haskell, Texas

- Coordinates: 33°09′31″N 99°44′45″W
- Country: United States
- State: Texas
- County: Haskell

Area
  - Total: 3.60 sq mi (9.32 km^{2})
  - Land: 3.60 sq mi (9.32 km^{2})
  - Water: 0 sq mi (0.00 km^{2})
- Elevation: 1,581 ft (482 m)

Population (2020)
  - Total: 3,089
  - Density: 858/sq mi (331/km^{2})
- Time zone: UTC-6 (Central (CST))
  - Summer (DST): UTC-5 (CDT)
- ZIP code: 79521
- Area code: 940
- FIPS code: 48-32696
- GNIS feature ID: 2410712
- Website: haskelltexasusa.com

Haskell is a city in central Haskell County, Texas, United States, and the county seat of Haskell County. As of the 2020 census, the city population was 3,089.

== History ==
Haskell was once the site of a watering place known as Willow Pond Springs. Thomas F. Tucker settled the site in 1879 upon the encouragement of his brother, a member of Randolph B. Marcy's 1849 expedition, and named it Rice Springs. When Haskell County was organized in 1885, the town became the county seat, and Tucker became the first county judge. The town was renamed to Haskell the same year.

In 1906, the Texas Central Railroad reached Haskell from Stamford. Haskell was subsequently incorporated in 1907.

== Geography ==
U.S. Route 277 passes through the eastern side of the city, leading northeast 98 miles (158 km) to Wichita Falls and south 54 miles (87 km) to Abilene. U.S. Route 380 runs through the center of Haskell as North 1st Street, leading east 162 miles (261 km) to Denton and west 107 miles (172 km) to Post. Lubbock is 147 miles (237 km) northwest of Haskell via US 380 and US 84.

According to the United States Census Bureau, the city has a total area of 3.6 square miles (9.3 km^{2}), all land.

== Haskell County Courthouse ==
The Haskell County Courthouse was completed in 1892 and was designed and built by A.O. Watson. The east and west wings were added in 1930–1931. It is one of the oldest courthouses still in use in the area.

== Government ==
Haskell is the county seat of Haskell County.

== Demographics ==
Historical population
Census	Pop.	Note	%±
1890	745		—
1910	2,436		—
1920	2,300		−5.6%
1930	2,632		14.4%
1940	3,051		15.9%
1950	3,836		25.7%
1960	4,016		4.7%
1970	3,655		−9.0%
1980	3,782		3.5%
1990	3,362		−11.1%
2000	3,106		−7.6%
2010	3,322		7.0%
2020	3,089		−7.0%
U.S. Decennial Census

=== 2020 census ===
As of the 2020 census, Haskell had a population of 3,089, 1,128 households, and 730 families. The median age was 39.9 years; 19.8% of residents were under 18 and 19.5% were 65 or older. For every 100 females, there were 113.9 males, and for every 100 females 18 and over, there were 117.5 males 18 and over.

Racial composition as of the 2020 census
Race	Number	Percent
White	2,254	73.0%
Black or African American	172	5.6%
American Indian and Alaska Native	18	0.6%
Asian	26	0.8%
Native Hawaiian and other Pacific Islander	2	0.1%
Some other race	357	11.6%
Two or more races	260	8.4%
Hispanic or Latino (of any race)	915	29.6%

Of the 1,128 households in Haskell, 27.7% had children under 18 living in them, 42.7% were married-couple households, 17.8% were households with a male householder and no spouse or partner present, and 34.2% were households with a female householder and no spouse or partner present. About 33.3% of all households were made up of individuals, and 15.9% had someone living alone who was 65 or older.

The city had 1,396 housing units, of which 19.2% were vacant. The homeowner vacancy rate was 2.0% and the rental vacancy rate was 11.8%.

None of residents lived in urban areas, while 100.0% lived in rural areas.

=== 2010 census ===
At the 2010 census, 3,322 people lived in the city, an increase of 6.95% since 2000 (216 people). The racial makeup of the town was 80.40% White, 4.94% African American, 0.75% Native American, 0.75% Asian, 10.69% from other races, and 2.47% from two or more races. Hispanics or Latinos of any race were 26.76% of the population.

=== 2000 census ===
At the 2000 census, 3,106 people, 1,295 households, and 868 families were living in the city. The population density was 912.8 inhabitants per square mile (352.4/km^{2}). The 1,526 housing units had an average density of 448.5 per square mile (173.2/km^{2}). The racial makeup of the city was 80.33% White, 3.90% African American, 0.55% Native American, 0.10% Asian, 12.46% from other races, and 2.67% from two or more races. Hispanics or Latinos of any race were 22.70%.

Of the 1,295 households, 29.7% had children under 18 living with them, 53.8% were married couples living together, 10.1% had a female householder with no husband present, and 32.9% were not families. About 31.3% of households were one person and 20.5% were one person 65 or older. The average household size was 2.32, and the average family size was 2.91.

The age distribution was 25.2% under 18, 5.7% from 18 to 24, 22.5% from 25 to 44, 20.6% from 45 to 64, and 25.9% were 65 or older. The median age was 42 years. For every 100 females, there were 83.5 males. For every 100 females 18 and over, there were 80.7 male.

The median income for a household was $20,740 and $27,109 for a family. Males had a median income of $20,245 versus $15,391 for females. The per capita income for the city was $13,114. About 21.5% of families and 28.7% of the population were below the poverty line, including 42.4% of those under 18 and 18.1% of those 65 or over.

== Education ==
The City of Haskell is served by the Haskell Consolidated Independent School District.

== Notable people ==
- Ralna English, singer
- D.H. Hamilton, Confederate soldier, member of the Texas House of Representatives, and judge
- John Kimbrough, actor and former member of the Texas House of Representatives
- Anita Thigpen Perry, former first lady of Texas
- Rick Perry, United States secretary of energy, former governor of Texas
- Larry D. Thomas, 2008 Texas state poet laureate

== Climate ==
The climate in this area is characterized by hot, humid summers and generally mild to cool winters. According to the Köppen climate classification, Haskell has a humid subtropical climate, Cfa on climate maps.

Climate data for Haskell, Texas (1991–2020 normals, extremes 1893–present)
Month	Jan	Feb	Mar	Apr	May	Jun	Jul	Aug	Sep	Oct	Nov	Dec	Year
Record high °F (°C)	89 (32)	94 (34)	101 (38)	107 (42)	112 (44)	115 (46)	115 (46)	115 (46)	109 (43)	105 (41)	91 (33)	89 (32)	115 (46)
Mean daily maximum °F (°C)	55.6 (13.1)	59.1 (15.1)	67.9 (19.9)	77.1 (25.1)	84.8 (29.3)	91.7 (33.2)	95.4 (35.2)	94.5 (34.7)	87.1 (30.6)	77.2 (25.1)	65.0 (18.3)	55.7 (13.2)	75.9 (24.4)
Daily mean °F (°C)	42.2 (5.7)	45.7 (7.6)	54.2 (12.3)	63.0 (17.2)	72.0 (22.2)	79.8 (26.6)	83.4 (28.6)	82.5 (28.1)	74.9 (23.8)	64.0 (17.8)	52.3 (11.3)	43.4 (6.3)	63.1 (17.3)
Mean daily minimum °F (°C)	28.9 (−1.7)	32.3 (0.2)	40.4 (4.7)	48.8 (9.3)	59.2 (15.1)	68.0 (20.0)	71.5 (21.9)	70.5 (21.4)	62.7 (17.1)	50.8 (10.4)	39.5 (4.2)	31.1 (−0.5)	50.3 (10.2)
Record low °F (°C)	−3 (−19)	−6 (−21)	5 (−15)	24 (−4)	34 (1)	46 (8)	54 (12)	49 (9)	36 (2)	18 (−8)	9 (−13)	−6 (−21)	−6 (−21)
Average precipitation inches (mm)	1.19 (30)	1.49 (38)	1.98 (50)	2.07 (53)	3.35 (85)	3.78 (96)	1.80 (46)	2.52 (64)	3.25 (83)	2.53 (64)	1.74 (44)	1.25 (32)	26.95 (685)
Average snowfall inches (cm)	0.4 (1.0)	1.4 (3.6)	0.0 (0.0)	0.0 (0.0)	0.0 (0.0)	0.0 (0.0)	0.0 (0.0)	0.0 (0.0)	0.0 (0.0)	0.0 (0.0)	0.5 (1.3)	0.8 (2.0)	3.1 (7.9)
Average precipitation days (≥ 0.01 in)	4.5	5.3	5.6	4.7	7.4	7.0	4.5	5.5	5.6	5.8	4.6	4.6	65.1
Average snowy days (≥ 0.1 in)	0.3	0.5	0.0	0.0	0.0	0.0	0.0	0.0	0.0	0.0	0.2	0.6	1.6
Source: NOAA
