= Nogalus Prairie, Texas =

Nogalus Prairie
- Unincorporated community
- Location within the state of Texas Nogalus Prairie (the United States)
- Coordinates: 31°15′20″N 95°5′18″W
- Country: United States
- State: Texas
- County: Trinity

Population (2000)
  - Total: 109
- Time zone: UTC-6 (Central (CST))
  - Summer (DST): UTC-5 (CDT)
- ZIP codes: 75847
- Area code: 936

Nogalus Prairie is an unincorporated community in Trinity County, Texas, United States. In 2000, the estimated population was 109 residents. It is located within the Huntsville, Texas micropolitan area.

== Historical development ==
The area was first settled by farmers migrating from Alabama and Georgia, under which the area was called Prairie View. A post office opened there under the name Nogallis Prairie in 1858. From local traditional stories, it is believed that two horse thieves were hanged there under a large tree and that the community was then called "Nogallows" by some. In the early 1860s, it was named Nogallis, then the spelling of the post office was changed eventually to its present form. The post office closed in 1868 but would re-open again in 1894 under the name Nogalus. Between 1900 and 1918, the community had a Methodist church, several stores, a cotton gin, a sawmill, a gristmill, and a Woodmen of the World lodge. It declined after World War I. The post office witnessed its final closure in 1920. From the mid-1930s, only a few families would remain there and were served by a church and a store. The remaining 20 residents as of the 1960s were farmers and ranchers, with some involved in the timber industry. The population went up to 41 in 1990, then to 109 in 2000.

The walnut and pecan trees that thrived there when Texas was still a province of Mexico and Spanish families lived in the area gave the community its original name, Nogales Prairie. It was sometimes known as Logallis Prairie in the late 1800s.

== Geography ==
Nogalus Prairie is located on Farm to Market Road 357, just west of Centralia, and 13 miles northeast of Groveton in northeastern Trinity County.

== Education ==
Nogalus Prairie is served by the Apple Springs Independent School District.
