= Westwood Shores, Texas =

- CDP
- Interactive map of Westwood Shores, Texas
- Coordinates: 30°56′15″N 95°19′32″W
- Country: United States
- State: Texas
- County: Trinity

Area
  - Total: 3.8 sq mi (9.8 km^{2})
  - Land: 3.2 sq mi (8.3 km^{2})
  - Water: 0.50 sq mi (1.3 km^{2})
- Elevation: 161 ft (49 m)

Population (2020)
  - Total: 1,239
  - Density: 390/sq mi (150/km^{2})
- Time zone: UTC-6 (Central (CST))
  - Summer (DST): UTC-5 (CDT)
- Zip Code: 75862
- GNIS feature ID: 2587004

Westwood Shores is a census-designated place (CDP) in Trinity County, Texas, United States. This was a new CDP for the 2010 census with a population of 1,162, increasing to 1,239 at the 2020 census.

== Geography ==
The CDP has a total area of 3.8 square miles (9.8 km^{2}), of which 3.2 square miles (8.3 km^{2}) is land and 0.5 square miles (1.3 km^{2}) is water.

== Demographics ==
Historical population
Census	Pop.	Note	%±
2010	1,162		—
2020	1,239		6.6%
U.S. Decennial Census; 1850–1900 1910; 1920 1930 1940; 1950 1960 1970; 1980 1990 2000; 2010 2020

Westwood Shores first appeared as a census designated place in the 2010 U.S. census.

=== 2020 census ===
Westwood Shores CDP, Texas – Racial and ethnic composition Note: the US Census treats Hispanic/Latino as an ethnic category. This table excludes Latinos from the racial categories and assigns them to a separate category. Hispanics/Latinos may be of any race.
Race / Ethnicity (NH = Non-Hispanic)	Pop 2010	Pop 2020	% 2010	% 2020
White alone (NH)	1,110	1,098	95.52%	88.62%
Black or African American alone (NH)	5	16	0.43%	1.29%
Native American or Alaska Native alone (NH)	10	0	0.86%	0.00%
Asian alone (NH)	2	6	0.17%	0.48%
Native Hawaiian or Pacific Islander alone (NH)	0	0	0.00%	0.00%
Other race alone (NH)	0	3	0.00%	0.24%
Mixed race or Multiracial (NH)	3	39	0.26%	3.15%
Hispanic or Latino (any race)	32	77	2.75%	6.21%
Total	1,162	1,239	100.00%	100.00%

As of the 2020 United States census, there were 1,239 people, 794 households, and 635 families residing in the CDP.
