= Texas State Highway 94 =

State highway in Texas

State Highway 94
- SH 94 highlighted in red

Route information
- Maintained by TxDOT
- Length: 50.27 mi (80.90 km)
- Existed: 1924–present

Major junctions
- West end: SH 19 in Trinity
- US 287 in Groveton
- East end: I-69 BL / Bus. US 59 / Bus. US 69 in Lufkin

Location
- Country: United States
- State: Texas
- Counties: Trinity, Angelina

Highway system
- Highways in Texas; Interstate; US; State; Former; Toll; Loops; Spurs; FM/RM; Park; Rec
← SH 93	→ SH 95

State Highway 94 (SH 94) is a state highway in the U.S. state of Texas that runs 50 miles (80 km) between Trinity and Lufkin. This route was designated on April 21, 1924, from Trinity to Groveton. On May 4, 1925, it was extended to Lufkin. On September 26, 1954, SH 94 was extended from old US 59 to new US 59 in Lufkin.

== Major junctions ==
County	Location	mi	km	Destinations	Notes
Trinity	Trinity	0.000	0.000	SH 19	
Trinity	Groveton			US 287	
Angelina	Lufkin	50.27	80.90	I-69 BL / Bus. US 59 / Bus. US 69	
1.000 mi = 1.609 km; 1.000 km = 0.621 mi
