= Thompson, Texas =

Unincorporated community in Texas, US

Coordinates: 31°05′54″N 95°18′58″W

Thompson (also known as Zion Hill) is an unincorporated community in Trinity County, Texas, United States. The community has a church and some homes; it once had a school, which opened in the 1880s. It is incorrectly sometimes referred as Brush Prairie, which was a town adjacent to Zion Hill.
