= Trinity Independent School District =

School district in Texas, United States

Address
- 101 West Jefferson Trinity, Texas, 75862; United States

District information
- Type: Public
- Grades: PK–12
- Schools: 3
- NCES District ID: 4843200

Students and staff
- Students: 1,220 (2023–2024)
- Teachers: 97.84 (on an FTE basis) (2023–2024)
- Staff: 87.80 (on an FTE basis) (2023–2024)
- Student–teacher ratio: 12.47 (2023–2024)

Other information
- Website: www.trinityisd.net

Trinity Independent School District is a public school district based in Trinity, Texas, United States; a portion of the district extends into northern Walker County.

In 2009, the school district was rated "academically acceptable" by the Texas Education Agency.

== Schools ==
- Lansberry Elementary (Grades PK-5)
- Trinity Junior High School (Grades 6–8)
- Trinity High School (Grades 9–12)

== General information ==
Trinity ISD is a public, K-12 school district located approximately 80 miles (130 km) northeast of Houston, Texas, and encompasses a geographic area of 142 square miles (370 km^{2}). The district serves approximately 1174 students (as of Fall 2006), and shows a slow growth in enrollment over the past decade.
