= Centerville Independent School District (Trinity County, Texas) =

School district in Texas, United States

Address
- 10327 North State Highway 94 Groveton, Texas, 75845; United States
- Coordinates: 31.1808°N 95.0441°W

District information
- Type: Public
- Grades: PK–12
- Schools: 1
- NCES District ID: 4813380

Students and staff
- Students: 155 (2023–2024)
- Teachers: 15.34 (on an FTE basis) (2023–2024)
- Staff: 11.78 (on an FTE basis) (2023–2024)
- Student–teacher ratio: 10.10 (2023–2024)

Other information
- Website: centervilleisd.net

Centerville Independent School District is a public school district located in Trinity County, Texas, USA. It is a small school with an attendance of fewer than 175 students.

In 2009, the school district was rated "recognized" by the Texas Education Agency.
