= Trinity County, Texas =

County in Texas, United States

- County
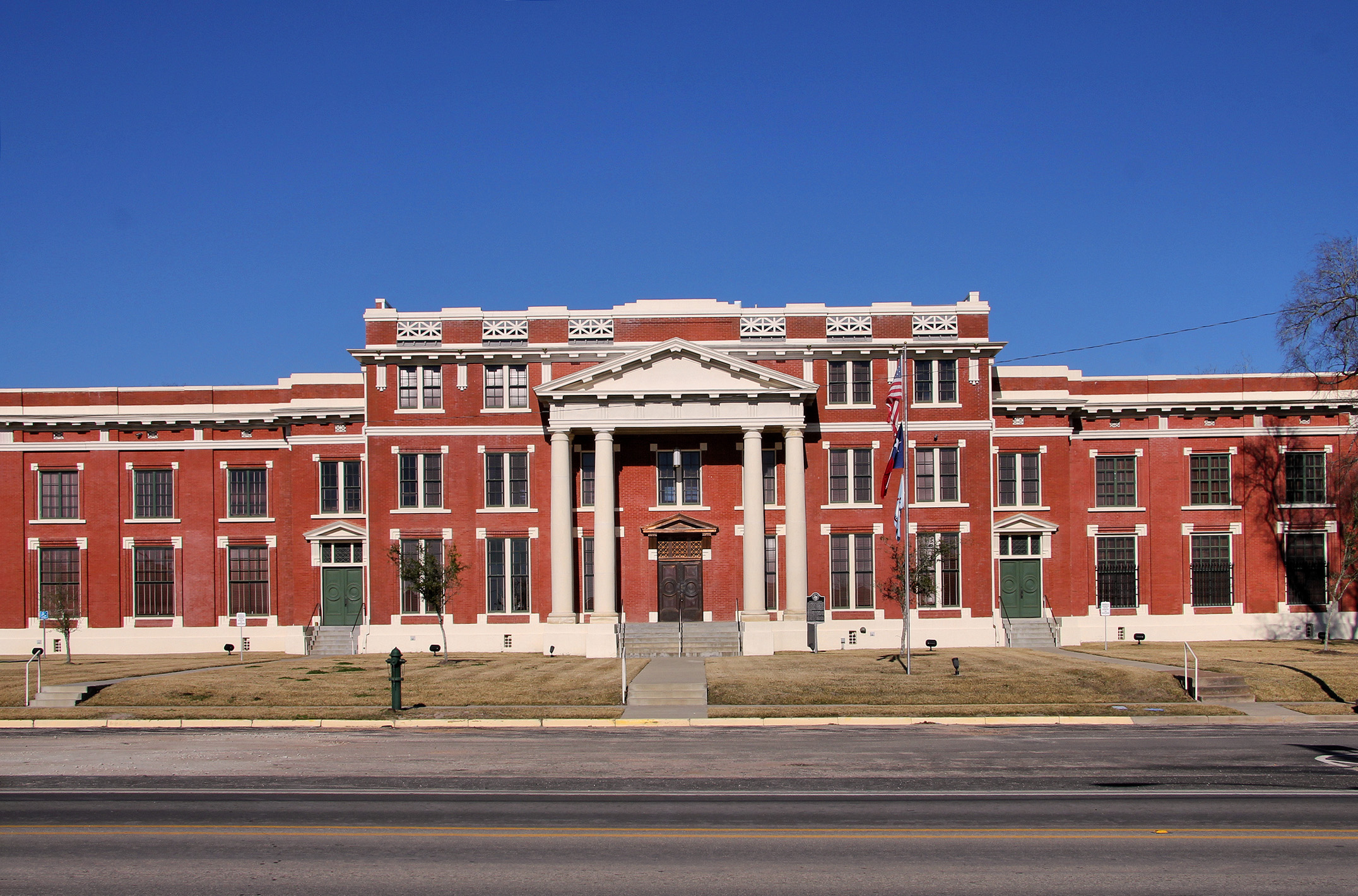
- The Trinity County Courthouse in Groveton

- Location within the U.S. state of Texas
- Coordinates: 31°05′N 95°07′W
- Country: United States
- State: Texas
- Founded: 1850
- Named for: Trinity River
- Seat: Groveton
- Largest city: Trinity

Area
  - Total: 714 sq mi (1,850 km^{2})
  - Land: 694 sq mi (1,800 km^{2})
  - Water: 20 sq mi (52 km^{2}) 2.9%

Population (2020)
  - Total: 13,602
  - Estimate (2025): 14,384 ▲
  - Density: 19.6/sq mi (7.57/km^{2})
- Time zone: UTC−6 (Central)
  - Summer (DST): UTC−5 (CDT)
- Congressional district: 17th
- Website: www.co.trinity.tx.us

Trinity County is a county located in the U.S. state of Texas. As of the 2020 census, its population was 13,602. Its county seat is Groveton. The county is named for the Trinity River. Trinity County is included in the Huntsville, Texas micropolitan statistical area.

== Geography ==
According to the U.S. Census Bureau, the county has a total area of 714 square miles (1,850 km^{2}), of which 20 sq mi (52 km^{2}) (2.9%) are covered by water.

=== Adjacent counties ===
- Angelina County (northeast)
- Polk County (southeast)
- San Jacinto County (south)
- Walker County (southwest)
- Houston County (northwest)

=== National protected area ===
- Davy Crockett National Forest (part)

== Demographics ==
Historical population
Census	Pop.	Note	%±
1860	4,392		—
1870	4,141		−5.7%
1880	4,915		18.7%
1890	7,648		55.6%
1900	10,976		43.5%
1910	12,768		16.3%
1920	13,623		6.7%
1930	13,637		0.1%
1940	13,705		0.5%
1950	10,040		−26.7%
1960	7,539		−24.9%
1970	7,628		1.2%
1980	9,450		23.9%
1990	11,445		21.1%
2000	13,779		20.4%
2010	14,585		5.8%
2020	13,602		−6.7%
2025 (est.)	14,384	▲	5.7%
U.S. Decennial Census; 1850–2010 2010 2020

=== Racial and ethnic composition ===
Trinity County, Texas – Racial and ethnic composition Note: the US Census treats Hispanic/Latino as an ethnic category. This table excludes Latinos from the racial categories and assigns them to a separate category. Hispanics/Latinos may be of any race.
Race / Ethnicity (NH = Non-Hispanic)	Pop 1980	Pop 1990	Pop 2000	Pop 2010	Pop 2020	% 1980	% 1990	% 2000	% 2010	% 2020
White alone (NH)	7,439	9,485	11,289	11,819	10,533	78.72%	82.87%	81.93%	81.04%	77.44%
Black or African American alone (NH)	1,904	1,642	1,635	1,377	1,086	20.15%	14.35%	11.87%	9.44%	7.98%
Native American or Alaska Native alone (NH)	15	24	50	57	29	0.16%	0.21%	0.36%	0.39%	0.21%
Asian alone (NH)	5	21	31	36	30	0.05%	0.18%	0.22%	0.25%	0.22%
Native Hawaiian or Pacific Islander alone (NH)	x	x	0	0	4	x	x	0.00%	0.00%	0.03%
Other race alone (NH)	3	1	1	13	33	0.03%	0.01%	0.01%	0.09%	0.24%
Mixed race or Multiracial (NH)	x	x	105	166	573	x	x	0.76%	1.14%	4.21%
Hispanic or Latino (any race)	84	272	668	1,117	1,314	0.89%	2.38%	4.85%	7.66%	9.66%
Total	9,450	11,445	13,779	14,585	13,602	100.00%	100.00%	100.00%	100.00%	100.00%

=== 2020 census ===
As of the 2020 census, the county had a population of 13,602. The median age was 50.6 years, with 19.3% of residents under the age of 18 and 27.3% of residents 65 years of age or older. For every 100 females there were 97.6 males, and for every 100 females age 18 and over there were 95.4 males age 18 and over.

The racial makeup of the county was 79.6% White, 8.0% Black or African American, 0.4% American Indian and Alaska Native, 0.2% Asian, <0.1% Native Hawaiian and Pacific Islander, 4.1% from some other race, and 7.5% from two or more races. Hispanic or Latino residents of any race comprised 9.7% of the population.

<0.1% of residents lived in urban areas, while 100.0% lived in rural areas.

There were 5,847 households in the county, of which 23.6% had children under the age of 18 living in them. Of all households, 47.4% were married-couple households, 20.7% were households with a male householder and no spouse or partner present, and 27.4% were households with a female householder and no spouse or partner present. About 31.7% of all households were made up of individuals and 17.4% had someone living alone who was 65 years of age or older.

There were 8,173 housing units, of which 28.5% were vacant. Among occupied housing units, 79.6% were owner-occupied and 20.4% were renter-occupied. The homeowner vacancy rate was 4.1% and the rental vacancy rate was 15.2%.

=== 2000 census ===
As of the 2000 census, 13,779 people, 5,723 households, and 4,000 families resided in the county. The population density was 20 people per square mile (7.7 people/km^{2}). The 8,141 housing units had an average density of 12 units per square mile (4.6 units/km^{2}). The racial makeup of the county was 83.75% White, 11.92% African American, 0.41% Native American, 0.23% Asian, 2.67% from other races, and 1.01% from two or more races. About 4.85% of the population were Hispanics or Latinos of any race.

Of the 5,723 households, 25.7% had children under 18 living with them, 55.1% were married couples living together, 11.2% had a female householder with no husband present, and 30.1% were not families. About 26.8% of all households were made up of individuals, and 14.6% had someone living alone who was 65 or older. The average household size was 2.38 and the average family size was 2.85.

In the county, the age distribution was 22.9% under 18, 7.0% from 18 to 24, 22.3% from 25 to 44, 25.8% from 45 to 64, and 22.0% who were 65 or older. The median age was 43 years. For every 100 females, there were 93.6 males. For every 100 females 18 and over, there were 90.7 males.

The median income for a household in the county was $27,070 and for a family was $32,304. Males had a median income of $27,518 versus $21,696 for females. The per capita income for the county was $15,472. About 13.20% of families and 17.60% of the population were below the poverty line, including 23.80% of those under age 18 and 13.90% of those age 65 or over.

== Education ==
These school districts serve Trinity County:

- Apple Springs Independent School District
- Groveton Independent School District
- Trinity Independent School District
- Centerville Independent School District

A small portion of Kennard ISD, located in neighboring Houston County, goes into Trinity County. The county is in the service area of Angelina College.

== Transportation ==
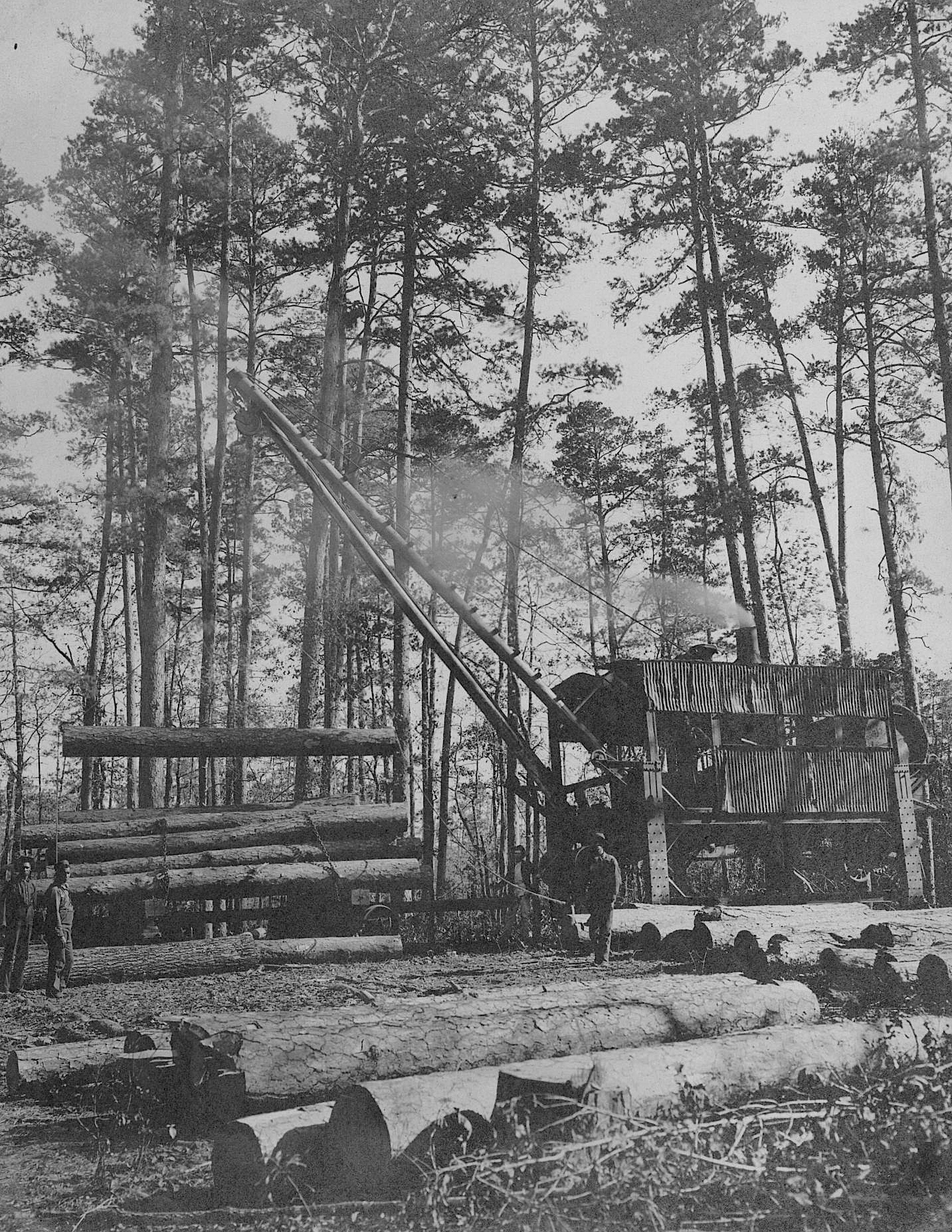
Southern Pine Lumber Company steam log loader, Trinity County around 1907: The crew is loading logs into a railcar.

=== Major highways ===
- U.S. Highway 287
- State Highway 19
- State Highway 94

=== Railroads ===
Union Pacific operates a freight line running north–south through Trinity County.

== Communities ==
=== Cities ===
- Groveton (county seat)
- Trinity

=== Census-designated place ===
- Westwood Shores

=== Unincorporated communities ===
- Apple Springs
- Barnes Switch
- Brush Prairie
- Carlisle
- Centerville
- Centralia
- Chita
- Crete
- Friday
- Helmic
- Josserand
- Lacy
- Nigton
- Nogalus Prairie
- Pennington (partly in Houston County)
- Red Branch
- Sebastopol
- South Groveton
- Sulphur
- Thompson
- Trevat
- Vair
- Woodlake

=== Ghost towns ===
- Friendship
- Saron
- Sumpter

== Politics ==
United States presidential election results for Trinity County, Texas
Year	Republican		Democratic		Third party(ies)	
Year	No.	%	No.	%	No.	%
1912	112	11.85%	657	69.52%	176	18.62%
1916	156	13.51%	906	78.44%	93	8.05%
1920	125	11.08%	643	57.00%	360	31.91%
1924	146	8.63%	1,504	88.89%	42	2.48%
1928	456	39.93%	686	60.07%	0	0.00%
1932	65	4.11%	1,514	95.70%	3	0.19%
1936	151	11.20%	1,196	88.72%	1	0.07%
1940	274	13.24%	1,791	86.56%	4	0.19%
1944	127	8.20%	1,132	73.13%	289	18.67%
1948	150	11.41%	905	68.82%	260	19.77%
1952	958	35.71%	1,725	64.29%	0	0.00%
1956	865	43.98%	1,091	55.47%	11	0.56%
1960	707	31.23%	1,521	67.18%	36	1.59%
1964	763	31.43%	1,654	68.12%	11	0.45%
1968	636	22.89%	1,146	41.24%	997	35.88%
1972	1,467	63.92%	826	35.99%	2	0.09%
1976	1,042	33.04%	2,100	66.58%	12	0.38%
1980	1,503	36.95%	2,510	61.70%	55	1.35%
1984	2,599	54.89%	2,115	44.67%	21	0.44%
1988	2,448	47.65%	2,657	51.72%	32	0.62%
1992	1,988	33.64%	2,784	47.11%	1,137	19.24%
1996	2,058	38.76%	2,774	52.24%	478	9.00%
2000	3,093	58.39%	2,142	40.44%	62	1.17%
2004	3,985	64.14%	2,204	35.47%	24	0.39%
2008	4,095	67.39%	1,925	31.68%	57	0.94%
2012	4,537	72.77%	1,614	25.89%	84	1.35%
2016	4,737	79.15%	1,154	19.28%	94	1.57%
2020	5,579	80.41%	1,323	19.07%	36	0.52%
2024	6,136	83.21%	1,195	16.21%	43	0.58%

United States Senate election results for Trinity County, Texas1
Year	Republican		Democratic		Third party(ies)	
Year	No.	%	No.	%	No.	%
2024	5,910	80.56%	1,298	17.69%	128	1.74%

United States Senate election results for Trinity County, Texas2
Year	Republican		Democratic		Third party(ies)	
Year	No.	%	No.	%	No.	%
2020	5,445	79.93%	1,258	18.47%	109	1.60%

Texas Gubernatorial election results for Trinity County
Year	Republican		Democratic		Third party(ies)	
Year	No.	%	No.	%	No.	%
2022	4,465	83.60%	825	15.45%	51	0.95%

== See also ==
- National Register of Historic Places listings in Trinity County, Texas
- Recorded Texas Historic Landmarks in Trinity County
