= Trinity, Texas =

- City
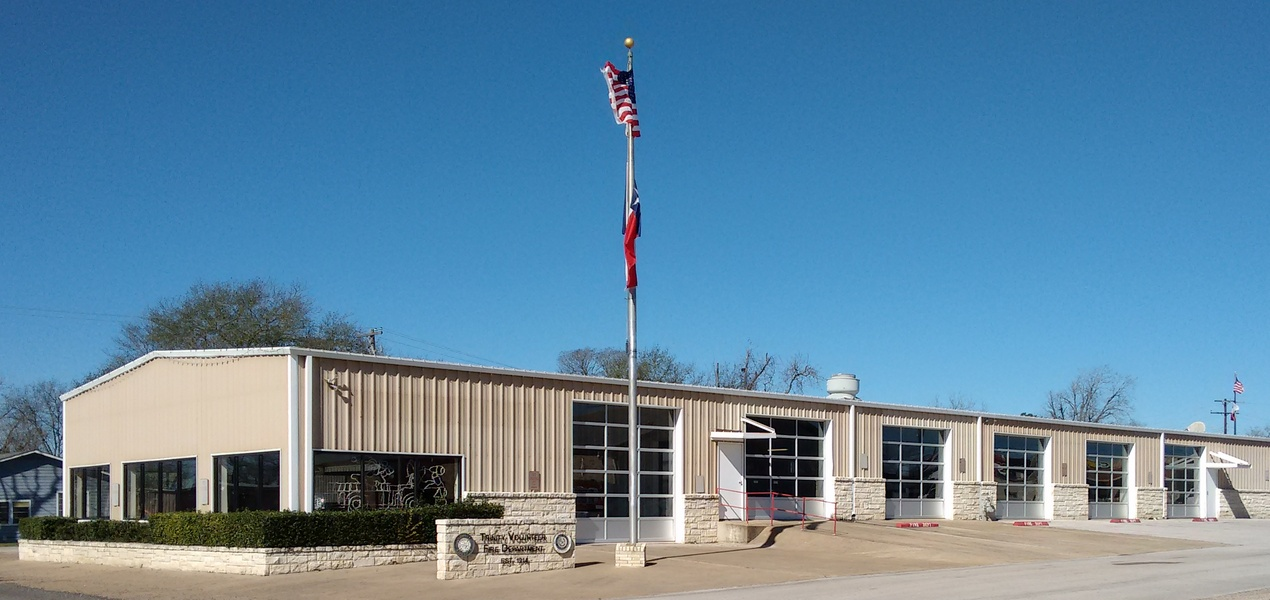
- Trinity Municipal Building, housing the volunteer fire department, the police department and city hall
- Motto: "You'll never want to leave!"
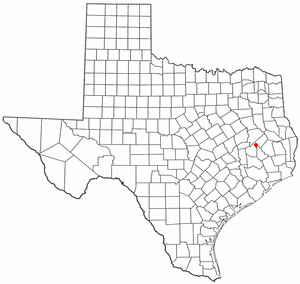
- Location of Trinity, Texas

- Coordinates: 30°56′38″N 95°22′36″W
- Country: United States
- State: Texas
- County: Trinity

Area
  - Total: 3.79 sq mi (9.82 km^{2})
  - Land: 3.79 sq mi (9.82 km^{2})
  - Water: 0 sq mi (0.00 km^{2})
- Elevation: 230 ft (70 m)

Population (2020)
  - Total: 2,343
  - Density: 727.0/sq mi (280.68/km^{2})
- Time zone: UTC-6 (Central (CST))
  - Summer (DST): UTC-5 (CDT)
- ZIP code: 75862
- Area code: 936
- FIPS code: 48-73664
- GNIS feature ID: 2412096
- Website: City of Trinity, Texas

Trinity is a city in Trinity County, Texas, United States. The population was 2,343 at the 2020 census.

== History ==
Trinity was founded in 1872 (possibly earlier as there is an 1870 Census for Trinity, Texas taken on 19 July, 1870) on land purchased from the New York and Texas Land Company. The town was a railroad station on the Houston and Great Northern Railroad.

The town was originally named Trinity Station after the Trinity River. The name of the town was later changed to Trinity City, then to Trinity. The town was incorporated in 1910.

=== Civilian Conservation Corps ===
A camp site for Civilian Conservation Corps Company 839 was established 1.6 miles east of Trinity on June 8, 1933. The company was under the command of Captain Charles H Brammel and the medical department was under the direction of Dr H H Thornton. The field activities of the camp were mainly construction and maintenance of fire lanes, fire break roads and telephone lines.

=== Texas Long Leaf Lumber Company ===
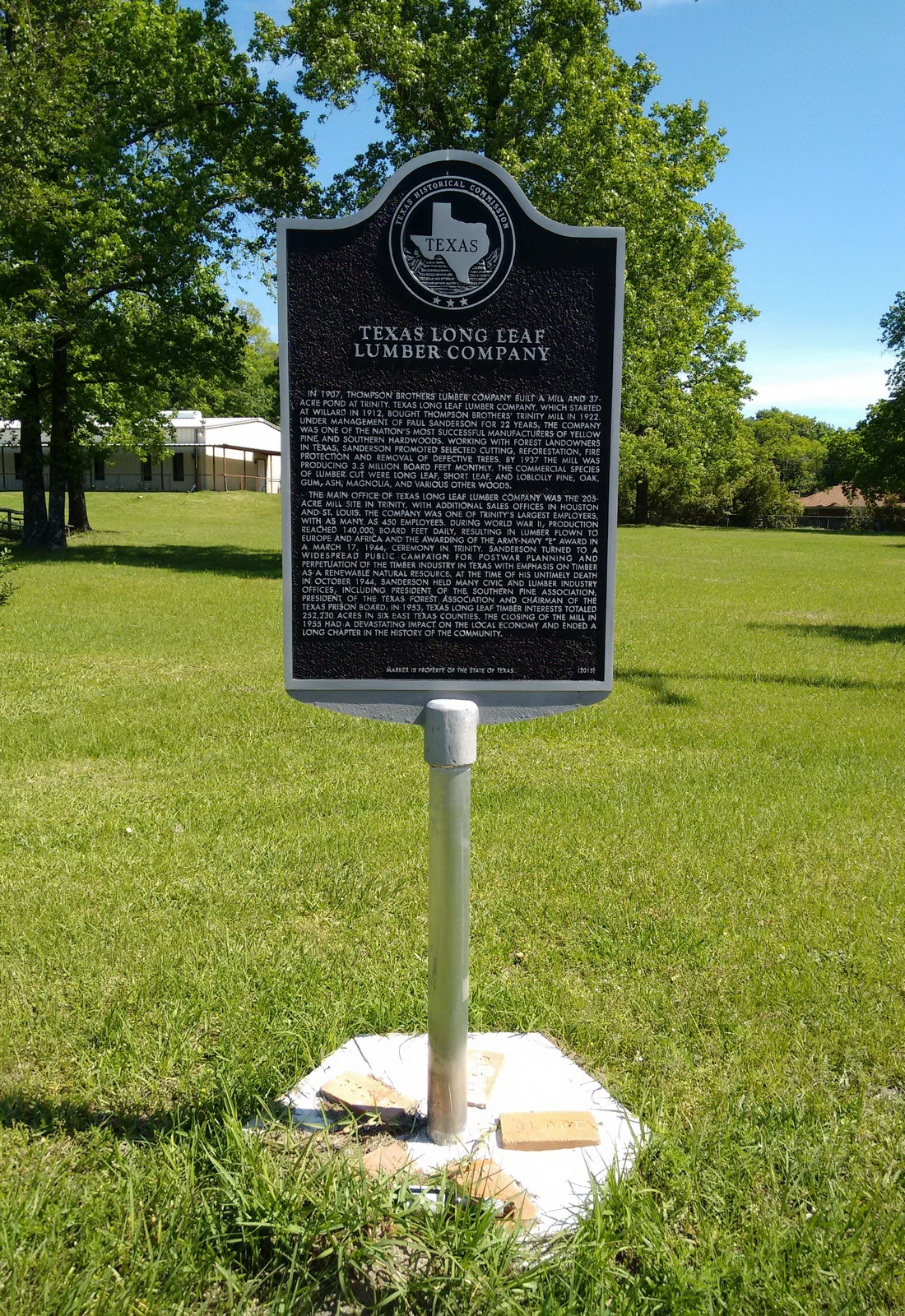
Texas Long Leaf Lumber Company Historical Marker

In 1907, Thompson Brothers' Lumber Company built a mill and 37 acre pond at Trinity. Texas Long Leaf Lumber Company, which started at Willard in 1912, bought Thompson Brothers' Trinity mill in 1922. Under management of Paul Sanderson for 22 years, the company was one of the nation's most successful manufacturers of Yellow Pine and Southern Hardwoods. During World War II, production reached 140,000 board feet daily, resulting in lumber flown to Europe and Africa and the awarding of the Army-Navy "E" Award in 1944. As one of the largest employers in Trinity, the closing of the mill in 1955 had a devastating impact on the local economy.

=== Hardin-Sublet gunfight ===
On August 7, 1872, John Wesley Hardin and Phil Sublet got into a gambling dispute at John Gates' saloon. The saloon was a plank structure with a bar and a ten pin alley. After making peace, Sublet left the saloon and called out Hardin from the street south of the front door. Hardin appeared at that door and Sublet fired one shot at him. Hardin returned fire, not intending to kill him. Distracted, Hardin was pulled into a middle door and Sublet wounded him with the other barrel of his shotgun. Hardin then went after him through the streets and into a dry goods store. After a pistol malfunction, Hardin fired again and hit Sublet in the shoulder. Too weak from his wounds, Hardin was unable to pursue him.

== Geography ==
According to the United States Census Bureau, the city has a total area of 3.8 square miles (9.8 km^{2}), all land.

Trinity, 80 miles (130 km) north of Houston, has two stoplights. Mandy Oaklander of the Houston Press called Trinity "a speck of a town".

Milltown, a community on the periphery, housed employees of the town lumber mill. It had 208 houses, with 156 for white lumber mill workers and 52 for the black workers.

== Demographics ==
Historical population
Census	Pop.	Note	%±
1890	856		—
1920	1,363		—
1930	2,036		49.4%
1940	2,217		8.9%
1950	2,054		−7.4%
1960	1,787		−13.0%
1970	2,512		40.6%
1980	2,620		4.3%
1990	2,648		1.1%
2000	2,721		2.8%
2010	2,697		−0.9%
2020	2,343		−13.1%
U.S. Decennial Census

=== 2020 census ===
As of the 2020 census, Trinity had a population of 2,343. The median age was 38.8 years. 25.9% of residents were under the age of 18 and 18.4% of residents were 65 years of age or older. For every 100 females there were 91.1 males, and for every 100 females age 18 and over there were 85.3 males age 18 and over.

0.0% of residents lived in urban areas, while 100.0% lived in rural areas.

There were 895 households in Trinity, of which 32.3% had children under the age of 18 living in them. Of all households, 35.4% were married-couple households, 22.2% were households with a male householder and no spouse or partner present, and 36.3% were households with a female householder and no spouse or partner present. About 35.1% of all households were made up of individuals and 16.8% had someone living alone who was 65 years of age or older.

There were 1,116 housing units, of which 19.8% were vacant. The homeowner vacancy rate was 2.1% and the rental vacancy rate was 20.0%.

Racial composition as of the 2020 census
Race	Number	Percent
White	1,227	52.4%
Black or African American	604	25.8%
American Indian and Alaska Native	15	0.6%
Asian	10	0.4%
Native Hawaiian and Other Pacific Islander	0	0.0%
Some other race	245	10.5%
Two or more races	242	10.3%
Hispanic or Latino (of any race)	515	22.0%

=== 2000 census ===
As of the census of 2000, there were 2,721 people, 1,098 households, and 703 families residing in the city. The population density was 720.2 inhabitants per square mile (278.1/km^{2}). There were 1,284 housing units at an average density of 339.9 per square mile (131.2/km^{2}). The racial makeup of the city was 57.18% White, 33.88% African American, 0.40% Native American, 0.48% Asian, 6.76% from other races, and 1.29% from two or more races. Hispanic or Latino of any race were 10.92% of the population.

There were 1,098 households, out of which 31.9% had children under the age of 18 living with them, 39.9% were married couples living together, 19.3% had a female householder with no husband present, and 35.9% were non-families. 32.1% of all households were made up of individuals, and 17.7% had someone living alone who was 65 years of age or older. The average household size was 2.48 and the average family size was 3.12.

In the city, the population was spread out, with 28.4% under the age of 18, 9.6% from 18 to 24, 23.8% from 25 to 44, 22.0% from 45 to 64, and 16.2% who were 65 years of age or older. The median age was 36 years. For every 100 females, there were 85.0 males. For every 100 females age 18 and over, there were 81.0 males.

The median income for a household in the city was $24,474, and the median income for a family was $28,678. Males had a median income of $24,470 versus $21,290 for females. The per capita income for the city was $14,320. About 15.2% of families and 24.9% of the population were below the poverty line, including 35.6% of those under age 18 and 24.4% of those age 65 or over.

== Arts and culture ==
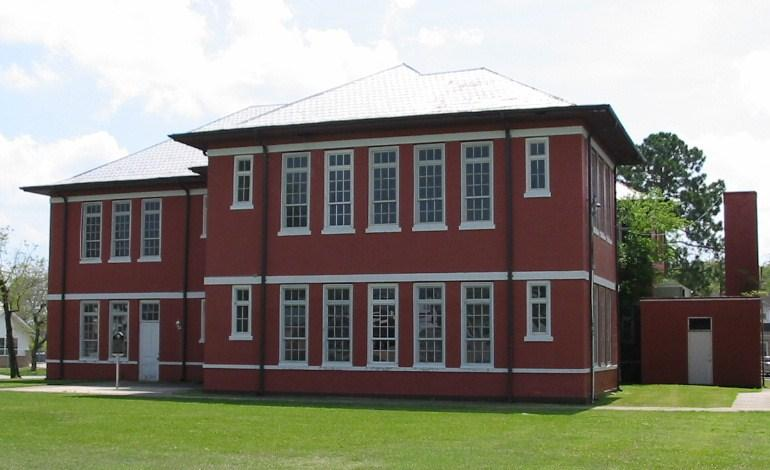
Old Red Schoolhouse

=== Old Red Schoolhouse ===
Completed in 1915, the Prairie Style, T-Plan building housed all grade levels until completion of an adjacent High School in 1928. "Old Red" served as a schoolhouse for 80 years. When it was slated for demolition in the 1990s, concerned citizens and former students worked with the School District to preserve the historic building for continued use. Listed in the National Register of Historic Places by the United States Department of the Interior.

== Education ==
The City of Trinity is served by the Trinity Independent School District. The city also has a public library named the Blanche K. Werner Public Library.

== Media ==
The Trinity Standard newspaper is published weekly by Polk County Publishing Company. Previous newspapers included The Trinity Tribune (1894), Democracy (1901), Trinity County News (1905), The Trinity Times (1927).

== Employment ==
Trinity was historically a lumber town and Texas Longleaf Lumber Co. was the main employer; its operations closed in 1955.

As of 2014, employment makeup of the city was: 25.8% Health Care & Social Assistance; 22.9% Retail Trade; 16.6% Accommodation & Food Services; 9.9% Educational Services; 7.3% Public Administration; 7.3% Wholesale Trade; 2.6% Professional, Scientific, & Technical Services; 2.2% Construction; 2.0% Administration & Support, Waste Management & Remediation; 1.2% Utilities; 1.0% Finance & Insurance; .4% Information; .4% Other Services; .2% Real Estate & Rental & Leasing; and .2% Transportation & Warehousing.

=== Trinity Steel Fabricators, Inc. ===
Trinity Steel Fabricators was founded in 1976 by the Karnes family. In 2013 the company moved its headquarters to Houston, Texas. In 2014 the company acquired United Steel Fabricators, Inc., a structural steel fabrication facility in Trinity, Texas.

=== Avalon Place Nursing Home ===
Avalon Place has a rating of two stars based on the health inspection, staffing, and quality measures ratings combined into one. The 118 bed nursing home is owned by Southwest LTC Trinity, Ltd, a for-profit partnership.

=== Higginbotham Brothers ===
Higginbotham Brothers is a hardware and sporting goods chain serving Texas since 1881. The company acquired Wilkison Hardware & Furniture in July 2017.

=== Trinity Rehabilitation and Healthcare Center ===
Trinity Rehabilitation and Healthcare Center has a rating of one star based on the health inspection, staffing, and quality measures ratings combined into one. The 76 bed nursing home is owned by Trinity Rhc LLC, a for-profit limited liability company.

== Infrastructure ==
=== Fire Department ===
Organized February 14, 1914, the Trinity Volunteer Fire Department began with 12 volunteers, 500 feet of hose, a shotgun and "some mighty strong lungs." When a fire broke out, one member would fire the shotgun and the rest would start yelling. Today TVFD members have advanced firefighting certification from the State Firemen's and Fire Marshal's Association.

=== Healthcare ===
CHI St. Luke's Health-Memorial Clinics opened an outpatient clinic Monday, August 7, 2017, in Trinity. CHI St. Luke's Health-Memorial officially signed a management service agreement with the Trinity Memorial Hospital District Board and its outpatient clinic. The hospital has yet to reopen.

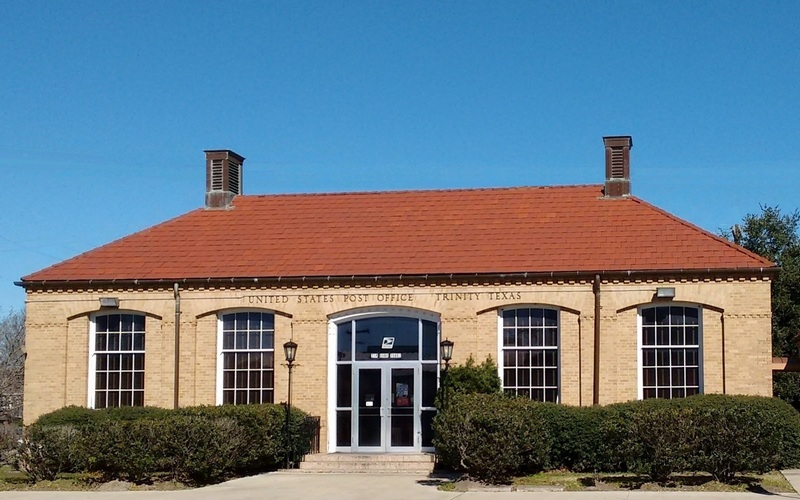
Post Office

=== Post Office ===
The post office was established February 28, 1872, with the appointment of Samuel Robb as postmaster. Construction of the current building was finished in August 1941, with Congressman Nat Patton as a keynote speaker during the opening ceremony.

== Notable people ==
- Linda Ellerbee, journalist
- William Goyen, novelist, born in Trinity April 24, 1915
- Rebert H. Harris, Gospel Singer, born in Trinity, March 23, 1916
- Ollie Matson, NFL Hall of Fame halfback and Olympic medalist, born in Trinity, May 1, 1930
- Charlie Wilson, Texas politician and lieutenant

== Gallery ==
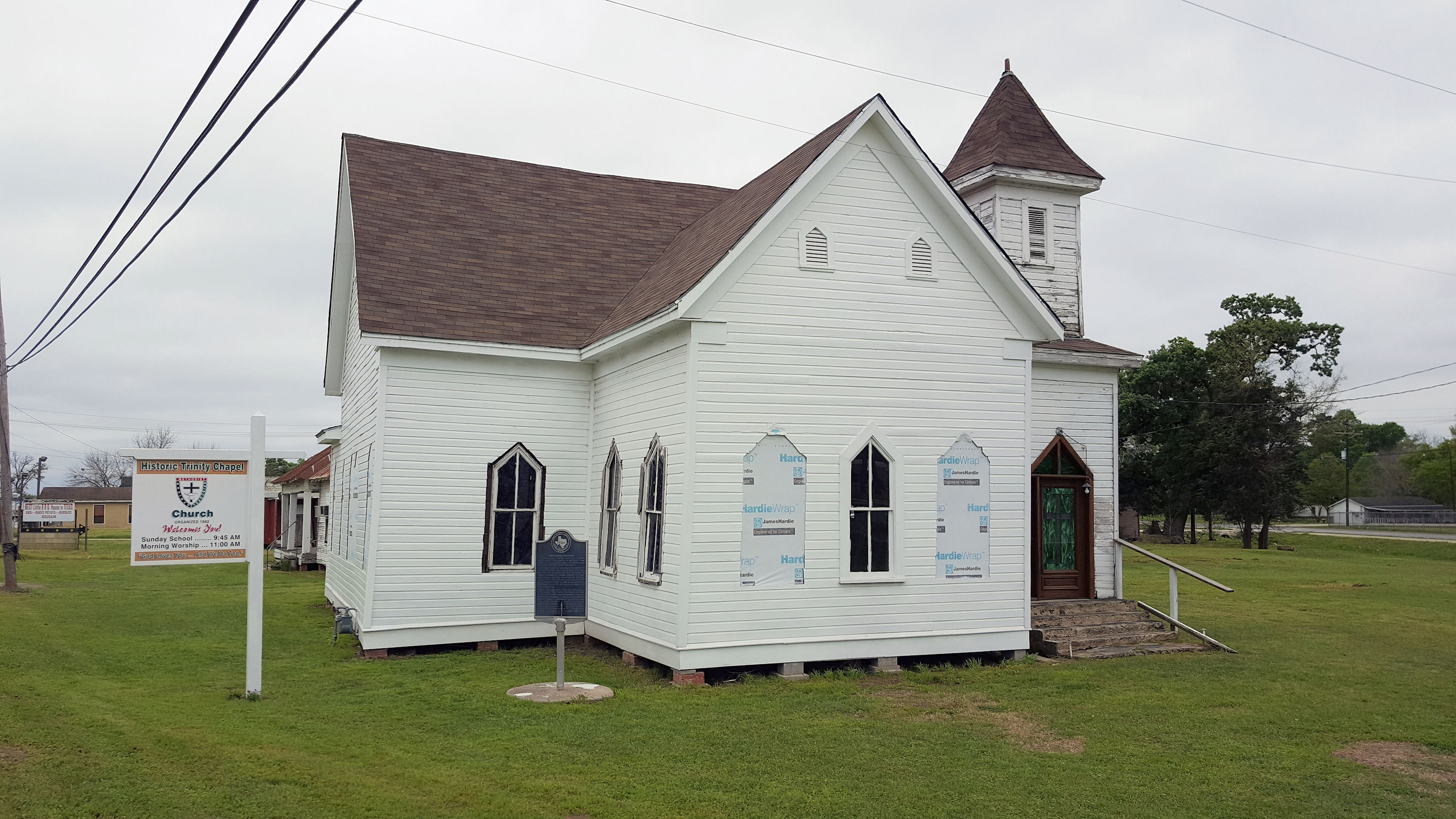
Trinity Chapel A.M.E. Church, 1890

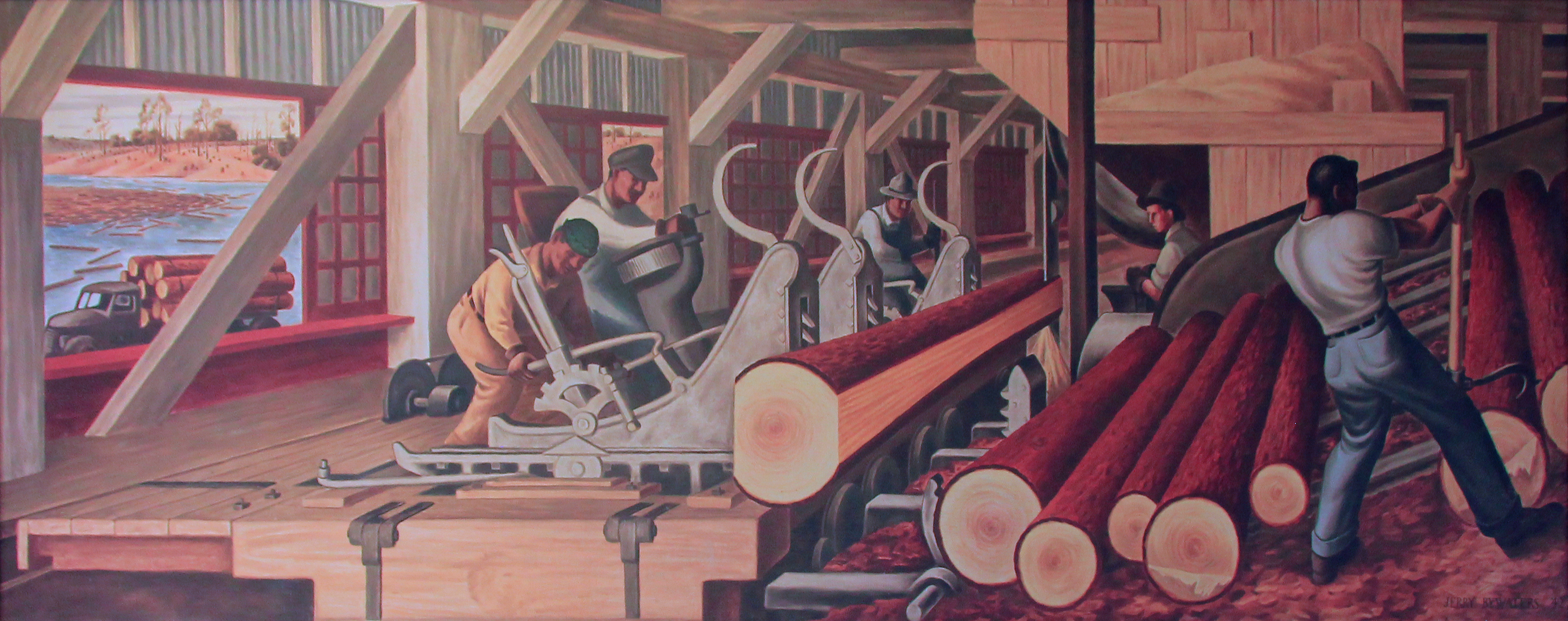
Post Office mural "Lumber Manufacturing" by Jerry Bywaters, 1942
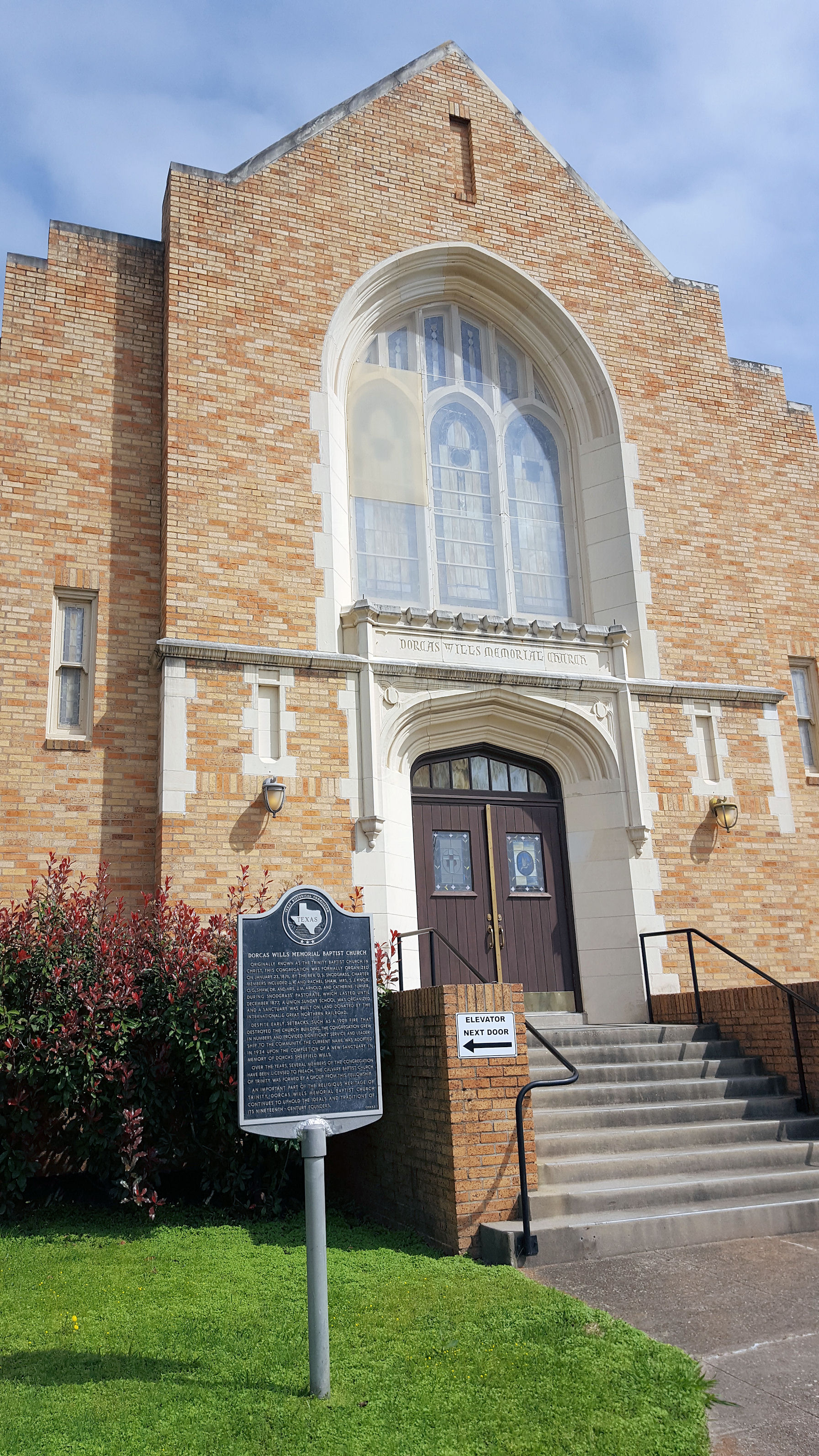
Dorcas Wills Memorial Baptist Church, 1934
