= Groveton Independent School District =

School district in Texas, United States

Address
- 207 North Main Street Groveton, Texas, 75845; United States

District information
- Type: Public
- Grades: PK–12
- Schools: 2
- NCES District ID: 4821900

Students and staff
- Students: 771 (2023–2024)
- Teachers: 62.23 (on an FTE basis) (2023–2024)
- Staff: 78.28 (on an FTE basis) (2023–2024)
- Student–teacher ratio: 12.39 (2023–2024)

Other information
- Website: www.grovetonisd.net

Groveton Independent School District is a public school district based in Groveton, Texas, United States. The football team of GISD won three state titles in 1984, 1989, and in 1990, the latter two led by future NFL player Rodney Thomas.

In 2009, the school district was rated "academically acceptable" by the Texas Education Agency.

== Schools ==
The District includes:

- Groveton Elementary
- Groveton Jr High
- Groveton High School
