= Groveton, Texas =

- City
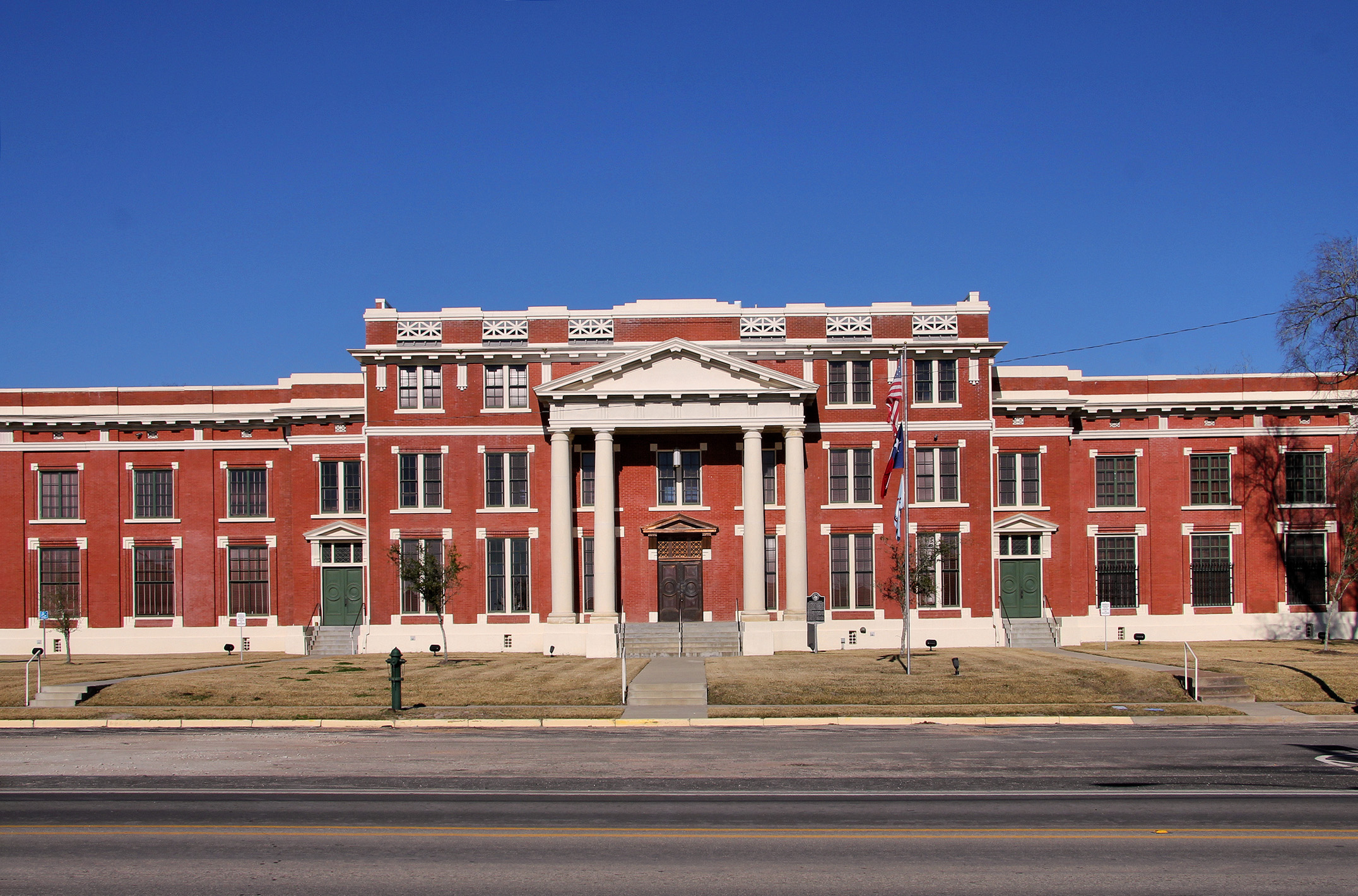
- The Trinity County Courthouse in Groveton

- Location of Groveton in Trinity County

- Location within the state of Texas
- Coordinates: 31°03′25″N 95°07′20″W
- Country: United States
- State: Texas
- County: Trinity

Area
  - Total: 2.61 sq mi (6.77 km^{2})
  - Land: 2.58 sq mi (6.69 km^{2})
  - Water: 0.031 sq mi (0.08 km^{2})
- Elevation: 331 ft (101 m)

Population (2020)
  - Total: 918
  - Density: 396.0/sq mi (152.89/km^{2})
- Time zone: UTC-6 (Central (CST))
  - Summer (DST): UTC-5 (CDT)
- ZIP code: 75845
- Area code: 936
- FIPS code: 48-31340
- GNIS feature ID: 2410670
- Website: https://cityofgroveton.com/

Groveton is a city in and the county seat of Trinity County, Texas, United States. The population was 918 at the 2020 census.

== Geography ==
According to the United States Census Bureau, the city has a total area of 2.6 sq mi (6.8 km^{2}), of which 2.6 sq mi (6.6 km^{2}) are land and 0.1 sq mi (0.1 km^{2}) (1.91%) is covered by water.

== Demographics ==
Historical population
Census	Pop.	Note	%±
1890	1,076		—
1920	1,103		—
1930	1,046		−5.2%
1940	940		−10.1%
1950	805		−14.4%
1960	1,148		42.6%
1970	1,219		6.2%
1980	1,262		3.5%
1990	1,071		−15.1%
2000	1,107		3.4%
2010	1,057		−4.5%
2020	918		−13.2%
U.S. Decennial Census

=== 2020 census ===
As of the 2020 census, Groveton had a population of 918. The median age was 43.1 years. 23.6% of residents were under the age of 18 and 24.4% of residents were 65 years of age or older. For every 100 females there were 84.7 males, and for every 100 females age 18 and over there were 77.9 males age 18 and over.

0.0% of residents lived in urban areas, while 100.0% lived in rural areas.

There were 377 households in Groveton, of which 30.5% had children under the age of 18 living in them. Of all households, 34.0% were married-couple households, 19.9% were households with a male householder and no spouse or partner present, and 39.8% were households with a female householder and no spouse or partner present. About 37.7% of all households were made up of individuals and 24.2% had someone living alone who was 65 years of age or older.

There were 478 housing units, of which 21.1% were vacant. The homeowner vacancy rate was 3.0% and the rental vacancy rate was 10.6%.

Racial composition as of the 2020 census
Race	Number	Percent
White	662	72.1%
Black or African American	158	17.2%
American Indian and Alaska Native	5	0.5%
Asian	0	0.0%
Native Hawaiian and Other Pacific Islander	2	0.2%
Some other race	46	5.0%
Two or more races	45	4.9%
Hispanic or Latino (of any race)	99	10.8%

=== 2000 census ===
As of the 2000 census, 1,107 people, 444 households, and 278 families resided in the city. The population density was 431.6 people/sq mi (167.0/km^{2}). The 565 housing units averaged 220.3/sq mi (85.2/km^{2}). The racial makeup of the city was 73.08% White, 18.25% African American, 0.18% Native American, 0.09% Asian, 6.23% from other races, and 2.17% from two or more races. Hispanics or Latinos of any race were 11.38% of the population.

Of the 444 households, 32.0% had children under the age of 18 living with them, 41.2% were married couples living together, 16.2% had a female householder with no husband present, and 37.2% were non-families. About 34.9% of all households were made up of individuals, and 21.6% had someone living alone who was 65 years of age or older. The average household size was 2.34 and the average family size was 3.04.

In the city, the population was distributed as 25.8% under the age of 18, 8.2% from 18 to 24, 24.8% from 25 to 44, 18.3% from 45 to 64, and 22.9% who were 65 years of age or older. The median age was 38 years. For every 100 females, there were 84.2 males. For every 100 females age 18 and over, there were 76.9 males.

The median income for a household in the city was $32,688. Males had a median income of $25,938 versus $22,532 for females. The per capita income for the city was $11,890. About 22.0% of families and 26.6% of the population were below the poverty line, including 31.7% of those under age 18 and 25.9% of those age 65 or over.

=== American Community Survey ===
According to the 2015–2019 American Community Survey 5-Year Estimate, 70.3% of residents are high school graduate or higher.

== Education ==
The City of Groveton is served by the Groveton Independent School District and is home to the Groveton Indians.

== Media ==
The Groveton News is published weekly by Polk County Publishing Company.

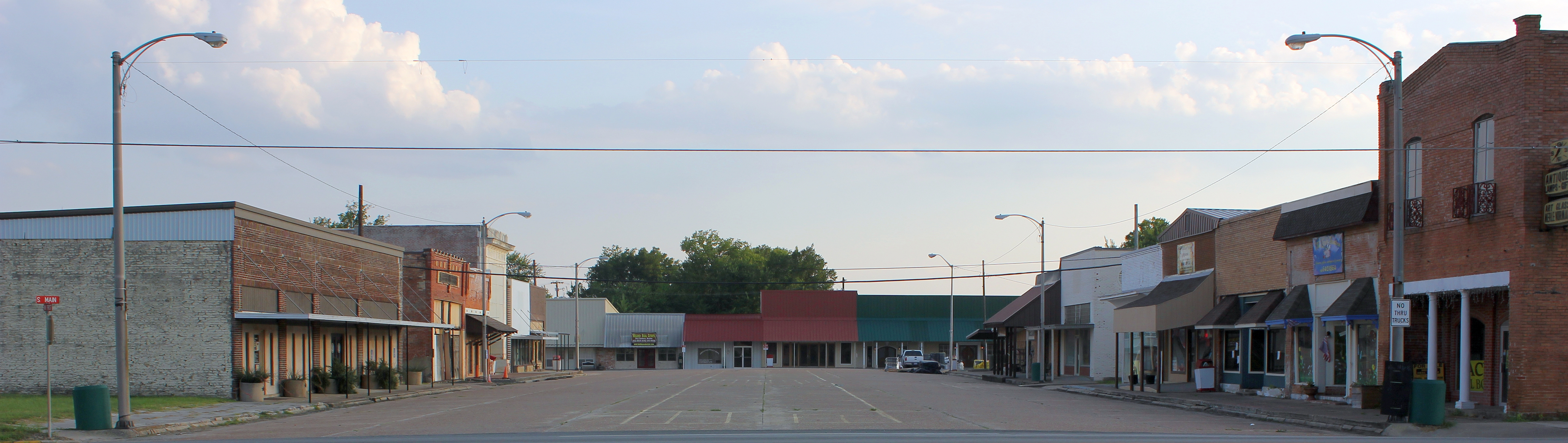
Downtown Groveton

== Notable people ==
- Tom Archia, Jazz tenor saxophonist
- Cody Johnson, country music singer-songwriter
- Lane Johnson, American football player
- Topper Rigney, baseball player
- Rodney Thomas, American football player
- Jacky Ward, country music singer
