= Kimberly Clark Saenz =

American serial killer

- 2012 Mugshot
- Born: Kimberly Clark Fowler; November 3, 1973 (age 53); Fall River, Massachusetts, U.S.
- Occupation: Former licensed practical nurse
- Children: 2
- Convictions: Capital murder (5 counts); Aggravated assault (3 counts)
- Penalty: Life plus 60 years

Details
- Victims: 10 (5 killed, 5 attempted)
- Country: United States
- State: Texas
- Date apprehended: 2008
- Imprisoned at: Patrick O'Daniel Unit of the Texas Department of Criminal Justice

Kimberly Clark Saenz (born November 3, 1973), also known as Kimberly Clark Fowler, is a former licensed practical nurse and a convicted serial killer. She was convicted of killing several patients at a Texas dialysis center by injecting bleach into their dialysis lines.

== Background ==
Saenz was born in Fall River, Massachusetts, as Kimberly Fowler. Kim attended Central ISD in Pollok, Texas (suburb of Lufkin, Texas) for at least her junior high and high school years. She was a cheerleader in junior high and part of high school. Her junior year of high school, she learned she was pregnant by her high school boyfriend and gave birth to her son that same year. This ended Kim's high school career as she left Central High School after the birth of her son. Kimberly eventually earned her high school diploma or equivalency of and went to Angelina College in Lufkin, Texas to earn her vocational nursing license. She was hired as a nurse at a DaVita dialysis clinic. She was hired despite a checkered employment history: at the time, she had been fired at least four times from healthcare jobs. One such firing came when her bosses at Woodland Heights Hospital caught her stealing Demerol (which was found in her handbag) and cheating on a urine test.

Saenz was married with two young children. She suffered from drug dependence and used stolen prescription medication. She had been arrested for public intoxication and criminal trespass after a 2007 domestic disturbance with her husband, though the two later reconciled.

== Murders and investigation ==
In the spring of 2008, DaVita's Lufkin clinic had an unusual spike in patients falling seriously ill during treatment. Emergency Medical Services had been called to the clinic 30 times in April, during the previous 15 months there had only been two such calls. One patient, Thelma Metcalf, had to go to the emergency room several times due to getting too much heparin blood thinner; other patients were going into cardiac arrest. The spike in Emergency Medical Service calls was especially unusual, since under normal conditions, dialysis patients rarely code.

After two patients, Thelma Metcalf and Clara Strange, died of cardiac arrest on April 1, DaVita sent clinical coordinator Amy Clinton to the Lufkin clinic. Despite Clinton's presence, the problems continued. Paramedics, unnerved by the situation, passed their concerns on to their superiors at the Lufkin fire department. A department official secretly wrote to state health inspectors and asked them to investigate.

On April 28, 2008, with inspectors on site, two more patients (Marva Rhone and Carolyn Risinger) suffered severe drops in blood pressure. Patients Linda Hall and Lurlene Hamilton subsequently testified that they saw Saenz draw a bleach solution into two syringes, then inject the substance into Rhone and Risinger's dialysis lines. When Clinton confronted Saenz, Saenz said she was cleaning an unused dialysis machine, and used a syringe to get a precise measurement–a method that was contrary to DaVita corporate policy. The bucket Saenz was using, as well as the syringes, tested positive for bleach. Police were called in, and the clinic was shut down for two months. After several other syringes used by Saenz tested positive for bleach, she was fired the following day. Her nursing license was subsequently suspended. Saenz then applied to work as a receptionist in a Lufkin medical office, in violation of her bail.

Research by an epidemiologist at the Centers for Disease Control and Prevention revealed that Saenz had been present at every incident in April at which someone died. A search of Saenz's hard drive revealed Google searches for information about whether bleach could kill. When questioned by police, Saenz mentioned her use of bleach to clean lines before detectives mentioned bleach. She claimed that no measuring cups were available, so she had to use a syringe to measure the bleach. She was subsequently arrested on charges of five counts of capital murder and five counts of aggravated assault with a deadly weapon.

According to one of Saenz's co-workers, Candace Lackey, Saenz had expressed dislike for a number of patients, all of whom either died or coded. Another coworker, Sharon Dearmon, recalled that Saenz went on a cigarette break after tending to a patient, Opal Few. Soon afterward, Few coded, but Saenz refused to rush over to tend to her.

Despite the damning forensic evidence, as well as eyewitness accounts, police and Angelina County prosecutors initially feared they did not have enough for a conviction. At first, they were at a loss to prove that the bleach had indeed gone from the patients' dialysis lines into their bloodstreams. At the time, little research had been done on how to detect bleach in blood. However, Mark Sochaski, an analytical chemist and bioterrorism expert, was developing a test for measuring chlorine exposure by measuring the presence of chlorotyrosine, an amino acid formed from exposure to chlorinating agents such as bleach. Angelina County officials contacted Sochaski, who tested several samples sent to him by investigators. Nine samples contained chlorotyrosine peaks that could only be explained by exposure to bleach. According to Sochaski, when the bleach entered the patients' bloodstream, it caused them to enter hemolysis, a process in which the red blood cells explode and release iron. This led to cardiac arrest and death.

== Conviction ==
On March 31, 2012, an Angelina County jury convicted Saenz of murdering five patients and injuring five others. Prosecutors sought the death penalty, but on April 2, 2012, Saenz was sentenced to life imprisonment without the possibility of parole for the five murders, plus three consecutive 20-year sentences, totalling sixty years, for aggravated assault. The five murder victims were Clara Strange, Thelma Metcalf, Garlin Kelley, Cora Bryant, and Opal Few.

District Attorney Clyde Herrington believed more victims existed than just the 10 indicted cases, based on CDC research. The CDC epidemiologist statistically connected Saenz to other adverse health events. Lufkin Police detectives could only obtain medical waste from two weeks prior to April 28, 2008, so the evidence was inadequate to raise further indictments against Saenz. At the victim impact statement portion of the trial, the daughter of victim Thelma Metcalf told Saenz, "You are nothing more than a psychopathic serial killer. I hope you burn in hell".

Saenz's defense team appealed to Twelfth Court of Appeal of Texas, but the appeal was denied.

Saenz, Texas Department of Criminal Justice #01775033, is serving her sentence at Patrick O'Daniel Unit (formerly Mountain View Unit) in Gatesville, Texas.

== See also ==
- List of serial killers in the United States
