= Platt, Texas =

- Ghost town
- Location within Texas Location within the United States
- Coordinates: 31°24′54″N 94°36′30″W
- Country: United States
- State: Texas
- County: Angelina
- Elevation: 200 ft (61 m)
- Time zone: UTC-6 (Central (CST))
  - Summer (DST): UTC-5 (CDT)
- Area code: 936
- GNIS feature ID: 1382524

Platt is a ghost town in Angelina County, in the U.S. state of Texas. It is located within the Lufkin, Texas micropolitan area.

== Geography ==
Platt was located on the Texas and New Orleans Railroad near Huntington in north-central Angelina County.

== Education ==
Platt had a one-room school in 1910. Today, the ghost town is located within the Lufkin Independent School District.

== See also ==
- List of ghost towns in Texas
