= Monterey, Angelina County, Texas =

Monterey, Texas
- Ghost town
- Location within Texas Location within the United States
- Coordinates: 31°13′49″N 94°23′44″W
- Country: United States
- State: Texas
- County: Angelina
- Elevation: 230 ft (70 m)
- Time zone: UTC-6 (Central (CST))
  - Summer (DST): UTC-5 (CDT)
- Area code: 936
- GNIS feature ID: 1380206

Monterey is a ghost town in Angelina County, in the U.S. state of Texas. It is located within the Lufkin, Texas micropolitan area.

== History ==
Monterey was the site of a mill established by the Industrial Lumber Company. The community once had a general store and had a post office in operation between 1902 and 1913. The community had a population of 25 in 1910 and was only a railroad switch by the beginning of World War II.

== Geography ==
Monterey was located on the St. Louis Southwestern Railway near the banks of the Angelina River, 11 mi (18 km) east of Huntington in southeastern Angelina County.

== Education ==
Today, the ghost town is located within the Lufkin Independent School District.

== See also ==
- List of ghost towns in Texas
