= Alco (disambiguation) =

Alco typically refers to the American Locomotive Company, a defunct locomotive manufacturer.

Alco may also refer to:

== Companies ==
- ALCO Stores, a defunct American discount store
- Alco Hydro-Aeroplane Company, the original name of the company that became Lockheed Corporation
- ALCO was a trade name of the British company Arthur Lyon & Co of London

== Places ==
- Alco, Arkansas, an unincorporated community in Stone County
- Alco, Louisiana, an unincorporated community in Vernon Parish
- Alco, Texas, a ghost town in Angelina County

== Other uses ==
- Alcon (classical history), an Ancient Greek name whose Latin form Alco is also used in English
- Acción Cultural Loyola (ACLO), a Bolivian radio network
- ALCO, the Asset and liability management committee

== See also ==
- Alko, the national alcoholic beverage retailing monopoly in Finland
