= Ora, Texas =

- Ghost town
- Location within Texas Location within the United States
- Coordinates: 31°16′39″N 94°25′40″W
- Country: United States
- State: Texas
- County: Angelina
- Elevation: 200 ft (61 m)
- Time zone: UTC-6 (Central (CST))
  - Summer (DST): UTC-5 (CDT)
- Area code: 936
- GNIS feature ID: 1382441

Ora is a ghost town in Angelina County, in the U.S. state of Texas. It is located within the Lufkin, Texas micropolitan area.

== Geography ==
Ora was located midway between Huntington and the Angelina River, 20 mi (32 km) east of Lufkin in eastern Angelina County.

== Education ==
Ora had a school known as the Plank School. It continued to operate in the 1930s. Today, the ghost town is located within the Huntington Independent School District.

== See also ==
- List of ghost towns in Texas
