= Durant, Texas =

- Ghost town
- Location within Texas Location within the United States
- Coordinates: 31°25′02″N 94°50′02″W
- Country: United States
- State: Texas
- County: Angelina
- Elevation: 345 ft (105 m)
- Time zone: UTC-6 (Central (CST))
  - Summer (DST): UTC-5 (CDT)
- Area code: 936
- GNIS feature ID: 1381810

Durant is a ghost town in Angelina County, in the U.S. state of Texas. It is located within the Lufkin, Texas micropolitan area.

== Geography ==
Durant was located 2 mi (3.2 km) northwest of Clawson in northwestern Angelina County.

== Education ==
Today, the ghost town is located within the Central Independent School District.

== See also ==
- List of ghost towns in Texas
