= U.S. Route 69 in Texas =

Section of U.S. Highway in Texas, United States

U.S. Highway 69
- US 69 highlighted in red

Route information
- Maintained by TxDOT
- Length: 338.643 mi (Note: Length does not account for concurrencies along Interstate Highways and U.S. Highways with lower numbers) (544.993 km)
- Existed: September 26, 1939–present

Major junctions
- South end: US 96 / US 287 / SH 87 in Port Arthur
- I-10 in Beaumont Future I-69 / US 59 in Lufkin; I-20 in Lindale; I-30 in Greenville; US 75 in Denison
- North end: US 69 / US 75 at the Oklahoma state line near Denison

Location
- Country: United States
- State: Texas
- Counties: Jefferson, Hardin, Tyler, Jasper, Angelina, Cherokee, Smith, Wood, Rains, Hunt, Fannin, Grayson

Highway system
- United States Numbered Highway System; List; Special; Divided; Highways in Texas; Interstate; US; State; Former; Toll; Loops; Spurs; FM/RM; Park; Rec
| ← I-69W | → SH 69 |

U.S. Route 69 (US 69) is a north–south United States highway that runs from Port Arthur, Texas to Albert Lea, Minnesota. In Texas, US 69 runs from Port Arthur near the Gulf of Mexico to the Texas–Oklahoma state line just north of Denison.

== Route description ==
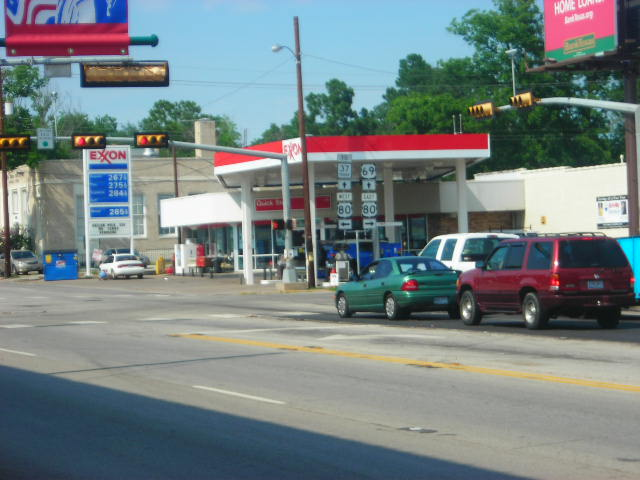
The junction of US Highways 69 and 80 in Mineola, Texas

US 69 begins at its southern terminus with SH 87 in Port Arthur. This intersection is also the southern terminus for US 96 and US 287, which are concurrent with US 69. US 69, US 96, and US 287 continue in a northwest, then west, route until its intersection with Interstate 10 in southern Beaumont. At this intersection, US 69, US 96, and US 287 merge with I-10. I-10/US 69/US 96/US 287 continue in a northerly direction through Beaumont for several miles. Just after the intersection with US 90, I-10 splits from the multiplex and resumes its easterly course, leaving US 69, US 96, and US 287 heading northwest through Beaumont. US 69 north of I-10 is also known officially known as Eastex Freeway, and is an official evacuation route, just as Interstate 69/US 59 heading north from Houston is known as Eastex Freeway as well.

In Lumberton, US 96 splits from US 69 and US 287 and heads northeast towards Jasper, while US 69 and US 287 continue on a northwest path towards Woodville.

In Woodville, US 69 splits from US 287 a few blocks north of US 190. US 287 continues northwest towards Corrigan while US 69 proceed north towards Lufkin. In this area, between US 190 in Woodville and FM 256 in Colmesneil, US 69 is a part of the Texas Forest Trail. Before reaching Lufkin, US 69 forms another segment of the Texas Forest Trail between SH 63 in Zavalla and FM 1818 northwest of Zavalla.

In Lufkin, US 69 is concurrent with US 59 and State Loop 287 while the route through the city is named Business US 69. US 69, State Loop 287, and US 59 continue around the east side of Lufkin until US 59 separates at the intersection with US 59 Business northeast of Lufkin. US 69 and State Loop 287 continue until the intersection of SH 103 and Business US 69 on the northwest section of Lufkin. At that point, US 69 is concurrent for a short distance with SH 103 and State Loop 287. At the intersection of US 69, State Loop 287 and SH 103, US 69 departs Lufkin and heads northwest while SH 103 and State Loop 287 head south.

US 69 continues on a north to northwest path through the towns of Alto, Rusk, Jacksonville and Bullard. Just south of Bullard, US 69 has a short concurrency with FM 2493. US 69 continues northward into Tyler.

In Tyler, US 69 continues northward through the city until the intersection of SH 110 and SH 155, where US 69 heads west and merges with SH 110 and SH 155 through Tyler. Around seven blocks from the intersection of US 69, SH 110, and SH 155, SH 155 separates from the concurrency and travels in a southwesterly direction, leaving US 69 and SH 110 traveling in a northwesterly direction. This continues until SH 110 separates from US 69 on the northwest side of Tyler. At this intersection, SH 110 heads west while US 69 continues north.

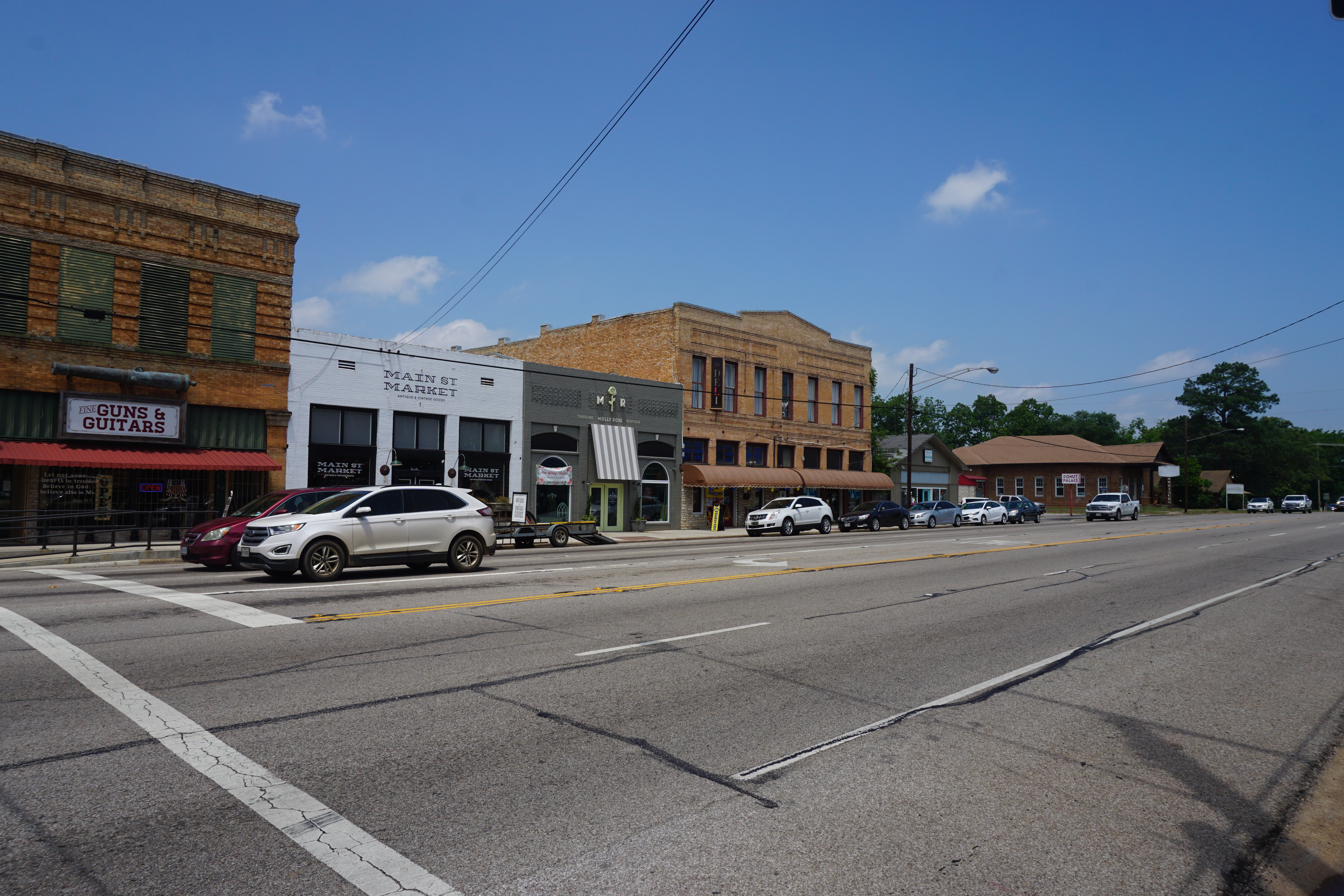
US 69 as Main Street in Lindale

US 69 crosses Interstate 20 at Lindale where it is signed as "Main Street". At FM 16 in Lindale, US 69 begins its third and last segment as part of the Texas Forest Trail. US 69 continues north to northwest to Mineola, crossing US 80 there. Before leaving town, at its intersection with SH 37, the Texas Forest Trail turns off of US 69 to share a segment with SH 37. US 69 takes a more northwest turn on its way through several small towns, including Emory, on its way to Greenville. There, as it begins to enter the city, a Business route of US 69 turns off to the right to serve the downtown Greenville area, and then on to a junction with Interstate 30. At the intersection with I-30, US 69 becomes concurrent with US 380 at its terminus. The concurrency continues around the southern and western sides of Greenville until an intersection with Spur 302. At that intersection, US 380 heads west while US 69 continues north, until it reaches the northern end of its Business route, which has passed through the downtown Greenville area, then US 69 turns northwest, from Greenville to Leonard, where it encounters a brief concurrency with SH 78.

In Whitewright, SH 11 intersects and becomes concurrent with US 69 southeast of town. This continues until the intersection with SH 160, at which time SH 11 continues on a northwestward route and US 69 continues north through Whitewright.

US 69 continues north, then northwest until Denison, where it turns right to go north, at an intersection with Spur 503. US 69 goes north through downtown Denison, then at the north side of town, US 69 intersects and merges with US 75, at which time US 69 becomes concurrent with US 75. Both head northeast across the Oklahoma/Texas border at the Red River.

== Future ==
As part of the I-14 System in Texas project, US 69 between Woodville and Beaumont is proposed to be upgraded to interstate standards. The interstate segment would begin at US 190 (Future I-14) and head southward before terminating at I-10.

== Junction list ==
| County | Location | mi | km | Exit | Destinations | Notes |
|---|---|---|---|---|---|---|
| Jefferson | Port Arthur | 0.00 | 0.00 | | SH 87 (Gulfway Drive) | Southern terminus; south end of US 96/287 overlap |
| Jefferson | Port Arthur | 1.9 | 3.1 | — | SH 73 – Winnie, Groves | South end of freeway |
| Jefferson | Port Arthur | 2.8 | 4.5 | — | 60th Street / Jimmy Johnson Boulevard | Access to The Medical Center of Southeast Texas |
| Jefferson | Port Arthur–Nederland line | 4.8 | 7.7 | — | FM 365 – Port Neches, Fannett | |
| Jefferson | Port Arthur–Nederland line | 5.8 | 9.3 | — | Nederland Drive | |
| Jefferson | Nederland | 6.6 | 10.6 | — | Jack Brooks Regional Airport | |
| Jefferson | Nederland | 7.4 | 11.9 | — | Beauxart Garden Road / Spurlock Road | |
| Jefferson | Central Gardens–Beaumont line | 8.9 | 14.3 | — | FM 3514 | |
| Jefferson | Beaumont | 11.4 | 18.3 | — | Jefferson County Prison Complex | Southbound exit and northbound entrance |
| Jefferson | Beaumont | 10.8 | 17.4 | — | SH 347 – Nederland | No southbound entrance |
| Jefferson | Beaumont | 12.4 | 20.0 | — | Spur 380 (M.L. King Parkway) | No southbound entrance |
| Jefferson | Beaumont | 13.8 | 22.2 | — | Spur 93 (Avenue A) / Highland Avenue | |
| Jefferson | Beaumont | 14.7 | 23.7 | — | Spur 93 (Avenue A) / Florida Avenue | |
| Jefferson | Beaumont | 15.6 | 25.1 | — | 4th Street | |
| Jefferson | Beaumont | 16.6 | 26.7 | — | SH 124 (Fannett Road) | |
| Jefferson | Beaumont | 17.6 | 28.3 | — | I-10 west – Houston | South end of I-10 overlap; I-10 exit 849 |
| Jefferson | Beaumont | 17.8 | 28.6 | 850 | Washington Boulevard | Exit numbers follow I-10; no exit number northbound |
| Jefferson | Beaumont | 18.8 | 30.3 | 851 | US 90 – Liberty | Access to Baptist Hospitals of Southeast Texas |
| Jefferson | Beaumont | 20.2 | 32.5 | 852A | Laurel Avenue | Southbound exit and northbound entrance |
| Jefferson | Beaumont | 19.2 | 30.9 | 852B | Calder Avenue / Harrison Avenue | |
| Jefferson | Beaumont | 20.4 | 32.8 | — | I-10 east – Lake Charles | North end of I-10 overlap; I-10 exit 853A |
| Jefferson | Beaumont | 21.5 | 34.6 | — | Delaware Street | |
| Jefferson | Beaumont | 21.9 | 35.2 | — | 11th Street | Southbound exit and northbound entrance |
| Jefferson | Beaumont | 21.7 | 34.9 | — | Lucas Drive | |
| Jefferson | Beaumont | 22.9 | 36.9 | — | Dowlen Road | |
| Jefferson | Beaumont | 23.7 | 38.1 | — | SH 105 – Sour Lake, Conroe | |
| Jefferson | Beaumont | 25.2 | 40.6 | — | Chinn Lane | No southbound exit |
| Jefferson | Beaumont | 25.6 | 41.2 | — | Old Voth Road / RFD Road | No northbound exit |
| Jefferson | Beaumont | 27.1 | 43.6 | — | Tram Road | |
| Hardin | Rose Hill Acres | 28.1 | 45.2 | — | Cooks Lake Road | |
| Hardin | Rose Hill Acres | 29.0 | 46.7 | — | Keith Road | |
| Hardin | Rose Hill Acres | 30.2 | 48.6 | — | FM 3513 / Mitchell Road | No northbound entrance |
| Hardin | Lumberton | 30.8 | 49.6 | — | US 96 north – Lumberton, Jasper | North end of US 96 overlap; north end of freeway |
| Hardin | Lumberton | 32.6 | 52.5 | | FM 421 to US 96 | |
| Hardin | | 40.7 | 65.5 | | SH 327 east – Silsbee | Access to Hardin County Airport |
| Hardin | Kountze | 43.5 | 70.0 | | SH 326 south – Sour Lake | |
| Hardin | Kountze | 44.2 | 71.1 | | FM 418 east – Silsbee | |
| Hardin | | 49.0 | 78.9 | | FM 1003 south – Honey Island | |
| Hardin | | 51.2 | 82.4 | | FM 420 east – Big Thicket National Preserve Visitor Center | |
| Hardin | Village Mills | 54.7 | 88.0 | | FM 3063 west – Wildwood | |
| Tyler | | 58.0 | 93.3 | | FM 2827 west | |
| Tyler | Warren | 62.1 | 99.9 | | FM 1943 east – Fred | South end of FM 1943 overlap |
| Tyler | Warren | 62.5 | 100.6 | | FM 1943 west | North end of FM 1943 overlap |
| Tyler | Hillister | 66.4 | 106.9 | | FM 1013 east – Spurger | |
| Tyler | Woodville | 74.8 | 120.4 | | US 190 – Livingston, Jasper | Access to Tyler County Hospital |
| Tyler | Woodville | 75.3 | 121.2 | | US 287 north – Chester | North end of US 287 overlap |
| Tyler | Doucette | 78.3 | 126.0 | | FM 1632 west to FM 256 | |
| Tyler | Colmesneil | 84.3 | 135.7 | | FM 256 east to US 190 | South end of FM 256 overlap |
| Tyler | Colmesneil | 84.4 | 135.8 | | FM 256 west to US 287 | |
| Tyler | | 86.5 | 139.2 | | RE 255 east – Sam Rayburn Dam, Toledo Bend Dam | |
| Tyler | | 92.2 | 148.4 | | FM 1014 east – Rockland | |
| Jasper | No major junctions | | | | | |
| Angelina | | 101.3 | 163.0 | | FM 1270 west | |
| Angelina | Zavalla | 102.8 | 165.4 | | SH 63 east to SH 147 north – Jasper, San Augustine | |
| Angelina | | 107.0 | 172.2 | | FM 1818 west – Diboll | |
| Angelina | | 112.5 | 181.1 | | FM 844 south | |
| Angelina | Huntington | 115.4 | 185.7 | | FM 1669 | |
| Angelina | Huntington | 116.1 | 186.8 | | FM 1475 west | |
| Angelina | | 118.5 | 190.7 | | FM 326 north | South end of FM 326 overlap |
| Angelina | Homer | 119.2 | 191.8 | | FM 326 south | North end of FM 326 overlap |
| Angelina | | 120.5 | 193.9 | | FM 841 west | |
| Angelina | Lufkin | 123.3 | 198.4 | | Future I-69 south / US 59 south / Bus. US 69 north / Loop 287 south – Houston | South end of Future I-69/US 59/Loop 287 overlap; south end of future freeway section |
| Angelina | Lufkin | 124.0 | 199.6 | — | FM 841 (Ford Chapel Road) | |
| Angelina | Lufkin | 124.8 | 200.8 | — | FM 325 (Lufkin Avenue) | Northbound access via the FM 841 exit |
| Angelina | Lufkin | 125.7 | 202.3 | — | SH 103 east / Atkinson Drive | South end of SH 103 overlap |
| Angelina | Lufkin | 126.8 | 204.1 | 386A | I-69 BL / Bus. US 59 / FM 2021 – Lufkin | Signed as exit 418 southbound |
| Angelina | Lufkin | 127.1 | 204.5 | 386B | Future I-69 north / US 59 north – Nacogdoches | Interchange; north end of Future I-69/US 59 overlap; north end of future freeway section |
| Angelina | Lufkin | 129.0 | 207.6 | | FM 2251 (Sayers Street) | |
| Angelina | Lufkin | 130.5 | 210.0 | | Bus. US 69 south (Kurth Drive) / Loop 287 north / FM 2680 / SH 103 west | Interchange; north end of SH 103 / Loop 287 overlap; access to Woodland Heights Medical Center |
| Angelina | | 132.6 | 213.4 | | FM 706 south | |
| Angelina | Clawson | 133.4 | 214.7 | | FM 2021 | |
| Angelina | Central | 135.6 | 218.2 | | FM 843 east – Allentown | |
| Angelina | | 139.4 | 224.3 | | SH 7 – Ratcliff, Nacogdoches, Center | Interchange |
| Cherokee | Wells | 144.5 | 232.6 | | FM 1247 west (Fourth Street) | |
| Cherokee | | 147.6 | 237.5 | | FM 1911 – Forest | |
| Cherokee | Alto | 157.6 | 253.6 | | FM 1911 south | |
| Cherokee | Alto | 158.2 | 254.6 | | SH 21 / SH 294 west – Crockett, Elkhart, Nacogdoches | |
| Cherokee | Alto | 158.4 | 254.9 | | FM 851 north – Atoy | |
| Cherokee | | 163.3 | 262.8 | | FM 241 – Salem, Linwood | |
| Cherokee | Rusk | 168.3 | 270.9 | | FM 343 – Atoy | |
| Cherokee | Rusk | 168.8 | 271.7 | | Loop 62 north – Rusk Business District | |
| Cherokee | Rusk | 169.9 | 273.4 | | US 84 / SH 110 north – Palestine, New Summerfield, Mount Enterprise | |
| Cherokee | Rusk | 170.1 | 273.7 | | Loop 62 south (Main Street) – Rusk Business District | |
| Cherokee | Rusk | 171.1 | 275.4 | | FM 2972 west to US 84 west – Hodge Unit, Skyview Unit | |
| Cherokee | Craft | 179.8 | 289.4 | | FM 22 east | |
| Cherokee | Jacksonville | 181.1 | 291.5 | | Loop 456 | |
| Cherokee | Jacksonville | 182.6 | 293.9 | | FM 768 south (Adams Street) | |
| Cherokee | Jacksonville | 183.5 | 295.3 | | US 79 (Rusk Street) | |
| Cherokee | Jacksonville | 183.8 | 295.8 | | SH 135 north (Pine Street) | |
| Cherokee | Jacksonville | 184.3 | 296.6 | | US 175 west (Alexander Boulevard) | |
| Cherokee | Jacksonville | 186.7 | 300.5 | | FM 347 south (Bolton Street) | |
| Cherokee | | 190.9 | 307.2 | | FM 855 south – Cuney | |
| Cherokee | | 191.0 | 307.4 | | FM 177 east – Mixon | |
| Cherokee | | 194.5 | 313.0 | | FM 2493 south – Mixon | South end of FM 2493 overlap |
| Cherokee | Bullard | 194.8 | 313.5 | | FM 2943 north – Bullard | North end of FM 2493 overlap |
| Smith | Bullard | 195.8 | 315.1 | | FM 344 – Bullard | Interchange |
| Smith | | 200.8 | 323.2 | | FM 346 | |
| Smith | Tyler | 203.2 | 327.0 | | FM 2813 west | |
| Smith | Tyler | 203.3 | 327.2 | | Loop 49 Toll | |
| Smith | Tyler | 207.6 | 334.1 | | Loop 323 (South Loop 323) | |
| Smith | Tyler | 209.4 | 337.0 | | FM 2943 south (Old Jacksonville Highway) / Eighth Street | |
| Smith | Tyler | 209.6 | 337.3 | | SH 64 east / SH 110 south / SH 155 north (Fifth Street, Fourth Street) | South end of SH 64/110/155 overlap; access to UT Health Tyler |
| Smith | Tyler | 210.3 | 338.4 | | SH 155 south (Vine Avenue) | North end of SH 155 overlap |
| Smith | Tyler | 211.4 | 340.2 | | SH 31 (Front Street) | Access to UT Health Tyler |
| Smith | Tyler | 211.7 | 340.7 | | SH 64 west (Erwin Street) | North end of SH 64 overlap; access to Tyler Pounds Regional Airport |
| Smith | Tyler | 212.6 | 342.1 | | Spur 147 east (Gentry Parkway) | |
| Smith | Tyler | 213.4 | 343.4 | | SH 110 north (Van Highway) | North end of SH 110 overlap |
| Smith | Tyler | 214.2 | 344.7 | | Loop 323 (Northwest Loop 323) | Access to Tyler Pounds Regional Airport |
| Smith | Tyler | 215.5 | 346.8 | | FM 2016 west | |
| Smith | Tyler–Swan line | 217.7 | 350.4 | | FM 3271 west | |
| Smith | Lindale | 221.1 | 355.8 | | I-20 – Dallas, Longview | I-20 exit 556 |
| Smith | Lindale | 224.7 | 361.6 | | FM 16 – Van, Winona | |
| Smith | Lindale | 225.9 | 363.6 | | FM 1804 north – Hoard | |
| Smith | | 227.2 | 365.6 | | Loop 49 Toll south | |
| Wood | Mineola | 234.5 | 377.4 | | Loop 564 | Interchange |
| Wood | Mineola | 236.6 | 380.8 | | US 80 (Broad Street) – Grand Saline, Hawkins | |
| Wood | Mineola | 236.8 | 381.1 | | FM 49 east (McDonald Street) – Hainesville | |
| Wood | Mineola | 237.2 | 381.7 | | FM 1254 north (Cage Street) | |
| Wood | Mineola | 237.3 | 381.9 | | SH 37 north (Pacific Street) – Quitman | |
| Wood | | 238.5 | 383.8 | | Loop 564 to US 80 | Access to Wood County Airport |
| Wood | Golden | 242.7 | 390.6 | | FM 779 – Golden, Quitman | |
| Wood | Golden | 243.8 | 392.4 | | FM 1799 south – Golden, Lake Holbrook | |
| Wood | Alba | 248.8 | 400.4 | | FM 17 – Grand Saline, Yantis | |
| Wood | Alba | 249.5 | 401.5 | | SH 182 east – Quitman | |
| Rains | | 251.5 | 404.8 | | FM 2795 north | |
| Rains | | 256.3 | 412.5 | | FM 779 | |
| Rains | Emory | 257.9 | 415.0 | | FM 2795 to FM 515 east – Lake Fork Reservoir | South end of FM 2795 overlap |
| Rains | Emory | 258.5 | 416.0 | | FM 2795 west | North end of FM 2795 overlap |
| Rains | Emory | 258.8 | 416.5 | | SH 19 – Canton, Sulphur Springs | |
| Rains | Emory | 259.2 | 417.1 | | SH 276 west / FM 2795 – Lake Tawakoni, Quinlan | |
| Rains | | 260.8 | 419.7 | | FM 3299 south | |
| Rains | | 262.2 | 422.0 | | FM 2795 east | |
| Rains | Point | 266.2 | 428.4 | | FM 47 south / Spur 161 north – Flats, Wills Point, Lake Tawakoni State Park | |
| Rains | Point | 266.6 | 429.1 | | FM 514 east | |
| Hunt | Lone Oak | 270.9 | 436.0 | | FM 2737 south | |
| Hunt | Lone Oak | 271.9 | 437.6 | | FM 513 south – East Tawakoni, Lake Tawakoni | South end of FM 513 overlap |
| Hunt | Lone Oak | 272.3 | 438.2 | | FM 1567 east – Miller Grove | |
| Hunt | Lone Oak | 273.0 | 439.4 | | FM 513 north – Campbell | North end of FM 513 overlap |
| Hunt | | 276.8 | 445.5 | | FM 2947 south | |
| Hunt | | 277.0 | 445.8 | | FM 1564 west – Wieland | |
| Hunt | Greenville | 284.5 | 457.9 | | Bus. US 69 north – Greenville | |
| Hunt | Greenville | 284.8 | 458.3 | | FM 1570 – Majors Airport | |
| Hunt | Greenville | 285.1 | 458.8 | | I-30 / US 67 – Dallas, Texarkana | Interchange; south end of US 380 overlap; I-30 exit 94 |
| Hunt | Greenville | 286.1 | 460.4 | | SH 34 (Wesley Street) – Terrell, Greenville | |
| Hunt | Greenville | 288.1 | 463.7 | | SH 66 west – Caddo Mills | |
| Hunt | Greenville | 288.9 | 464.9 | | US 380 west / Spur 302 east – McKinney | North end of US 380 overlap |
| Hunt | | 291.0 | 468.3 | | FM 1569 west – Merit | |
| Hunt | | 291.7 | 469.4 | | Bus. US 69 south – Greenville | Interchange |
| Hunt | | 294.7 | 474.3 | | FM 2194 west | |
| Hunt | Kingston | 297.3 | 478.5 | | FM 3427 east | |
| Hunt | Kingston | 297.7 | 479.1 | | FM 903 west | |
| Hunt | Celeste | 300.3 | 483.3 | | FM 272 east – Hickory Creek | |
| Hunt | Celeste | 300.8 | 484.1 | | FM 1562 west | |
| Fannin | Leonard | 307.0 | 494.1 | | FM 272 east – Wolfe City | |
| Fannin | Leonard | 307.3 | 494.6 | | SH 78 south – Leonard | South end of SH 78 overlap |
| Fannin | Leonard | 307.9 | 495.5 | | SH 78 north – Bonham | North end of SH 78 overlap |
| Fannin | Leonard | 308.7 | 496.8 | | FM 896 – Randolph | |
| Fannin | | 311.5 | 501.3 | | FM 981 south | |
| Fannin | Trenton | 314.1 | 505.5 | | Bus. US 69 north – Trenton | |
| Fannin | Trenton | 314.7 | 506.5 | | SH 121 – McKinney, Bonham | Interchange |
| Fannin | Trenton | 314.8 | 506.6 | | FM 151 north – Orangeville | |
| Grayson | | 319.6 | 514.3 | | SH 11 east – Randolph | South end of SH 11 overlap |
| Grayson | Whitewright | 320.3 | 515.5 | | FM 898 east (Bond Street) | |
| Grayson | Whitewright | 320.7 | 516.1 | | SH 11 west / SH 160 south – Sherman | North end of SH 11 overlap |
| Grayson | Whitewright | 321.3 | 517.1 | | FM 151 south – Whitewright | |
| Grayson | | 321.9 | 518.0 | | FM 697 west – Ida | |
| Grayson | Bells | 328.1 | 528.0 | | SH 56 – Sherman, Bonham | |
| Grayson | Bells | 328.5 | 528.7 | | FM 1897 north – Ambrose | |
| Grayson | Bells | 329.7 | 530.6 | | US 82 – Sherman, Bonham | US 82 exit 653 |
| Grayson | Denison | 340.0 | 547.2 | | Spur 503 west – Sherman | |
| Grayson | Denison | 341.4 | 549.4 | | FM 120 (Morton Street) – Pottsboro | |
| Grayson | Denison | 343.0 | 552.0 | | FM 84 west – Eisenhower State Park | |
| Grayson | Denison | 344.6 | 554.6 | | US 75 south | South end of SB US 75 overlap; US 75 exit 73 |
| Grayson | Denison | | | 74 | Frontage Road | Exit numbers follow US 75 mileposts; southbound exit and entrance |
| Grayson | Denison | 345.8 | 556.5 | 75 | Texas Travel Information Center | South end of NB US 75 overlap; US 75 exit 74 northbound |
| Grayson | Denison | 345.9 | 556.7 | | US 69 north / US 75 north – Durant | Continuation into Oklahoma |
1.000 mi = 1.609 km; 1.000 km = 0.621 mi: Concurrency terminus; Incomplete access; Tolled

== Notes ==
U.S. Route 69
| Previous state: Terminus | Texas | Next state: Oklahoma |
