= Dunagan, Texas =

- Ghost town
- Location within Texas Location within the United States
- Coordinates: 31°20′48″N 94°36′55″W
- Country: United States
- State: Texas
- County: Angelina
- Elevation: 305 ft (93 m)
- Time zone: UTC-6 (Central (CST))
  - Summer (DST): UTC-5 (CDT)
- Area code: 936
- GNIS feature ID: 1381806

Dunagan is a ghost town in Angelina County, in the U.S. state of Texas. It is located within the Lufkin, Texas micropolitan area.

== History ==
Dunagan was first settled in the early 1840s.

The Angelina and Neches River Railroad operates a line traveling 11.6 miles (18.7 km) to an interchange with the Union Pacific Railroad in Lufkin. The ghost town is located within the Lufkin Independent School District.

== Geography ==
Dunagan was located 7 mi (11 km) east of Lufkin and 5 mi (8.0 km) northwest of Huntington in central Angelina County.

== See also ==
- List of ghost towns in Texas
