= Boynton, Texas =

- Ghost town
- Location within Texas Location within the United States
- Coordinates: 31°14′09″N 94°25′47″W
- Country: United States
- State: Texas
- County: Angelina
- Elevation: 276 ft (84 m)
- Time zone: UTC-6 (Central (CST))
  - Summer (DST): UTC-5 (CDT)
- Area code: 936
- GNIS feature ID: 1379451

Boynton is a ghost town in Angelina County, in the U.S. state of Texas. It is located within the Lufkin, Texas micropolitan area.

== History ==
The area in what is known as Boynton today was settled in 1904 and was founded by the Boynton Lumber Company. A sawmill was established there at that time and had a daily capacity of 25,000 ft (7,600 m) of board and had 75 employees at its most prosperous point. The mill was closed in 1908 and Boynton became a ghost town shortly after. Only a few scattered houses remained in the early 1990s.

== Geography ==
Boynton was located on the Texas and New Orleans Railroad, 10 mi (16 km) southeast of Huntington in southeastern Angelina County.

== Education ==
Today, the ghost town is located within the Huntington Independent School District.

== See also ==
- List of ghost towns in Texas
