= Central, Angelina County, Texas =

- Unincorporated community
- Location within Texas Location within the United States
- Coordinates: 31°25′39″N 94°48′31″W
- Country: United States
- State: Texas
- County: Angelina
- Elevation: 433 ft (132 m)
- Time zone: UTC-6 (Central (CST))
  - Summer (DST): UTC-5 (CDT)
- Area code: 936
- GNIS feature ID: 1381621

Central is an unincorporated community in Angelina County, in the U.S. state of Texas. According to the Handbook of Texas, the community had a population of 200 in 2000. It is located within the Lufkin, Texas micropolitan area.

== History ==
The area in what is now known as Central today was settled sometime before 1900, but began to decline in the aftermath of World War II.

Historical population
Year	Pop.	±%
1990	105	—
2000	200	+90.5%

== Geography ==
Central is located on U.S. Highway 69, 8 mi (13 km) northwest of Lufkin in northwestern Angelina County.

== Education ==
Central was home to a schoolhouse that served nearby farms in the 1900s, giving it the name Central School. The school was still in operation in the mid-1930s and the early 1990s. Today, the community is served by the Central Independent School District.
