= Shawnee, Angelina County, Texas =

Shawnee, Texas
- Ghost town
- Location within Texas Location within the United States
- Coordinates: 31°12′50″N 94°29′57″W
- Country: United States
- State: Texas
- County: Angelina
- Elevation: 236 ft (72 m)
- Time zone: UTC-6 (Central (CST))
  - Summer (DST): UTC-5 (CDT)
- Area code: 936
- GNIS feature ID: 1380525

Shawnee is a ghost town in Angelina County, in the U.S. state of Texas. It is located within the Lufkin, Texas micropolitan area.

== Geography ==
Shawnee was located on the Texas and New Orleans Railroad at the intersection of U.S. Highway 69 and Farm to Market Road 1818, 4 mi (6.4 km) northwest of Zavalla and north of Shawnee Creek and the ghost town of Shawnee Prairie in central Angelina County.

== Education ==
Today, the ghost town is located within the Huntington Independent School District.

== See also ==
- List of ghost towns in Texas
