= Rocky Springs, Texas =

- Ghost town
- Location within Texas Location within the United States
- Coordinates: 31°19′25″N 94°35′44″W
- Country: United States
- State: Texas
- County: Angelina
- Elevation: 331 ft (101 m)
- Time zone: UTC-6 (Central (CST))
  - Summer (DST): UTC-5 (CDT)
- Area code: 936
- GNIS feature ID: 1383720

Rocky Springs is a ghost town in Angelina County, in the U.S. state of Texas. It is located within the Lufkin, Texas micropolitan area.

== History ==
Rocky Springs had several houses in the late 1930s. Many residents left the area, but a church and cemetery were in the community as late as the 1980s. Its cemetery was shown on maps in 2000.

== Geography ==
Rocky Springs was located on Farm to Market Road 1475, 8 mi (13 km) east of Lufkin in east-central Angelina County.

== Education ==
Rocky Springs had its school in the 1930s. Today, the ghost town is located within the Huntington Independent School District.

== See also ==
- List of ghost towns in Texas
