= Baber, Texas =

Ghost town in Texas, US

Baber is a ghost town in Angelina County, Texas, United States. In c. 1906, businessman S. F. Carter opened a sawmill on the Texas and New Orleans Railroad, followed by a larger sawmill operated by J. P. Carter, which produced 50,000 feet of plank per day. Named for a lumberjack, Baber's post office opened in 1907; it was consolidated by nearby Huntington in 1915. It peaked in the 1910s, with 100 residents.
