= Ewing, Angelina County, Texas =

- Ghost town
- Location within Texas Location within the United States
- Coordinates: 31°22′22″N 94°29′26″W
- Country: United States
- State: Texas
- County: Angelina
- Elevation: 187 ft (57 m)
- Time zone: UTC-6 (Central (CST))
  - Summer (DST): UTC-5 (CDT)
- Area code: 936
- GNIS feature ID: 1381855

Ewing is a ghost town in Angelina County, Texas, United States. It is located within the Lufkin, Texas, micropolitan area.

== Education ==
Today, the ghost town is located within the Huntington Independent School District.

== See also ==
- List of ghost towns in Texas
