= Moffett, Texas =

- Unincorporated community
- Location within Texas Location within the United States
- Coordinates: 31°23′54″N 94°38′36″W
- Country: United States
- State: Texas
- County: Angelina
- Elevation: 269 ft (82 m)
- Time zone: UTC-6 (Central (CST))
  - Summer (DST): UTC-5 (CDT)
- Area code: 936
- GNIS feature ID: 1382314

Moffett, also spelled Moffitt, is an unincorporated community in Angelina County, in the U.S. state of Texas. According to the Handbook of Texas, the community had a population of 100 in 2000. It is located within the Lufkin, Texas micropolitan area.

== History ==
The area in what is now known as Moffett today was first settled before 1900. The community had a sawmill, a store, a church, and several houses in the 1930s. Many residents left Moffett after World War II, but it had a church, a store, and a community center and was identified as a dispersed rural community in the early 1990s. It had a population of 100 in 2000.

== Geography ==
Moffett is located on Farm to Market Road 842, 6 mi (9.7 km) northeast of Lufkin in northern Angelina County.

== Education ==
Moffett is served by the Lufkin Independent School District.
