= Alco, Texas =

- Ghost town
- Location within Texas Location within the United States
- Coordinates: 31°21′08″N 94°34′14″W
- Country: United States
- State: Texas
- County: Angelina
- Elevation: 282 ft (86 m)
- Time zone: UTC-6 (Central (CST))
  - Summer (DST): UTC-5 (CDT)
- Area code: 936
- GNIS feature ID: 1381297

Alco is a ghost town in Angelina County, in the U.S. state of Texas. It is located within the Lufkin, Texas micropolitan area.

== History ==
Alco started as a flag station around 1911 after the Angelina and Neches River Railroad built through the community. There was a sawmill and a few houses in the 1930s. The sawmill closed during World War II and Alco became a ghost town. Only a few scattered, abandoned houses remained in the 1990s.

== Geography ==
Alco was located on the Angelina and Neches River Railroad, 10 mi (16 km) northeast of Lufkin in northeastern Angelina County.

== Education ==
Alco had its school in the 1930s. Today, the ghost town is located within the Huntington Independent School District.

== See also ==
- List of ghost towns in Texas
