= Bald Hill, Texas =

- Unincorporated community
- Location within Texas Location within the United States
- Coordinates: 31°14′23″N 94°38′42″W
- Country: United States
- State: Texas
- County: Angelina
- Elevation: 272 ft (83 m)
- Time zone: UTC-6 (Central (CST))
  - Summer (DST): UTC-5 (CDT)
- Area code: 936
- GNIS feature ID: 1379384

Bald Hill is an unincorporated community in Angelina County, in the U.S. state of Texas. According to the Handbook of Texas, the community had a population of 100 in 2000. It is located within the Lufkin, Texas micropolitan area.

== History ==
The area in what is now known as Bald Hill today was settled sometime before 1900. It had three churches, several stores, and several houses in the 1930s. Many residents left the community after World War II, but it had three churches, a community center, and several scattered houses in the early 1990s. The community had a population of 100 in 2000.

== Geography ==
Bald Hill is located on Farm to Market Road 326, 8 mi (13 km) southeast of Lufkin in central Angelina County.

== Education ==
Bald Hill had its own school in the 1930s. Today, the community is served by the Lufkin Independent School District.
