= Nancy, Texas =

- Ghost town
- Location within Texas Location within the United States
- Coordinates: 31°06′21″N 94°25′51″W
- Country: United States
- State: Texas
- County: Angelina
- Elevation: 213 ft (65 m)
- Time zone: UTC-6 (Central (CST))
  - Summer (DST): UTC-5 (CDT)
- Area code: 936
- GNIS feature ID: 1382372

Nancy is a ghost town in Angelina County, in the U.S. state of Texas. It is located within the Lufkin, Texas micropolitan area.

== History ==
On November 13, 1972, an F2 tornado hit Nancy, killing two people.

== Education ==
Nancy once had its own school. Today, the ghost town is located within the Zavalla Independent School District.

== See also ==
- List of ghost towns in Texas
