= Peavy, Texas =

- Ghost town
- Location within Texas Location within the United States
- Coordinates: 31°17′43″N 94°48′39″W
- Country: United States
- State: Texas
- County: Angelina
- Elevation: 262 ft (80 m)
- Time zone: UTC-6 (Central (CST))
  - Summer (DST): UTC-5 (CDT)
- Area code: 936
- GNIS feature ID: 1382469

Peavy is a ghost town in Angelina County, in the U.S. state of Texas. It is located within the Lufkin, Texas micropolitan area.

== History ==
Peavy was one of the many sawmills built in the area during the 1880s. It was named for members of a local family with the surname who came to the area from Alabama. Anderson Jasper Peavy was a well-known lumberjack in both Angelina County and Louisiana. The community had a population of 100 in 1904.

== Geography ==
Peavy was located on the Texas Southeastern Railroad near the intersection of Farm to Market Roads 1194 and 1271, 4 mi (6.4 km) southwest of Lufkin in Angelina County.

== Education ==
The Peavy Switch School District was joined with the Hudson Independent School District, along with those in Providence and Happy Hour.

== See also ==
- List of ghost towns in Texas
