= Redland, Texas =

- Census-designated place
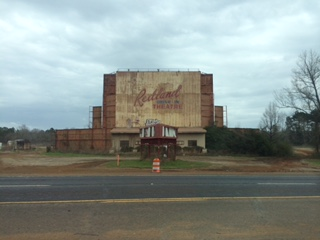
- Abandoned Redland Drive In Movie Theater (demolished in 2020) in Redland, Texas

- Location within Texas
- Coordinates: 31°24′12″N 94°43′06″W
- Country: United States
- State: Texas
- County: Angelina

Area
  - Total: 4.15 sq mi (10.74 km^{2})
  - Land: 4.12 sq mi (10.68 km^{2})
  - Water: 0.027 sq mi (0.07 km^{2})
- Elevation: 325 ft (99 m)

Population (2010)
  - Total: 1,047
  - Density: 253.9/sq mi (98.03/km^{2})
- Time zone: UTC-6 (Central (CST))
  - Summer (DST): UTC-5 (CDT)
- ZIP code: 75901, 75904
- Area code: 936
- FIPS code: 48-61124
- GNIS feature ID: 2586978

Redland is an unincorporated town and census-designated place (CDP) in Angelina County, Texas, United States. As of the 2020 census, Redland had a population of 1,088. This was a new CDP for the 2010 census.

== Geography ==
Redland is located in northern Angelina County, 6 miles (10 km) north of the center of Lufkin, the county seat. U.S. Route 59, a four-lane highway, runs through the CDP, leading south to Lufkin and north 14 miles (23 km) to Nacogdoches.

According to the United States Census Bureau, the CDP has a total area of 4.1 square miles (10.7 km^{2}), of which 0.03 square miles (0.07 km^{2}), or 0.62%, is water.

== Demographics ==
Historical population
Census	Pop.	Note	%±
2010	1,047		—
2020	1,088		3.9%
U.S. Decennial Census; 1850–1900 1910; 1920 1930 1940; 1950 1960 1970; 1980 1990 2000; 2010 2020

Redland first appeared as a census designated place in the 2010 U.S. census.

=== 2020 census ===
Redland CDP, Texas – Racial and ethnic composition Note: the US Census treats Hispanic/Latino as an ethnic category. This table excludes Latinos from the racial categories and assigns them to a separate category. Hispanics/Latinos may be of any race.
Race / Ethnicity (NH = Non-Hispanic)	Pop 2010	Pop 2020	% 2010	% 2020
White alone (NH)	551	502	52.63%	46.14%
Black or African American alone (NH)	230	275	21.97%	25.28%
Native American or Alaska Native alone (NH)	10	0	0.96%	0.00%
Asian alone (NH)	5	2	0.48%	0.18%
Native Hawaiian or Pacific Islander alone (NH)	0	0	0.00%	0.00%
Other race alone (NH)	0	0	0.00%	0.09%
Mixed race or Multiracial (NH)	11	15	1.05%	1.38%
Hispanic or Latino (any race)	240	293	22.92%	26.93%
Total	1,047	1,088	100.00%	100.00%
