= Alcedo, Texas =

Ghost town in Texas, US

Aledo is a ghost town in Angelina County, Texas, United States. A stop on the Texas South-Eastern Railroad, it was established as a logging camp for the Southern Pine Lumber Company. A post office operated from 1916 to 1924, with exception to 1919. It was abandoned by the 1930s.
