= Lufkin High School =

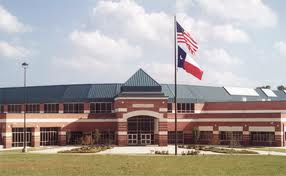

Location
- 309 Medford Drive; Lufkin, Angelina County, Texas 75901; United States; 31°20′09″N 94°41′17″W

Information
- School type: Public, high school
- Established: 1905
- Locale: Town: Remote
- School district: Lufkin ISD
- NCES School ID: 482855007762
- Principal: Julie McManus
- Staff: 170.12 (on an FTE basis)
- Grades: 9–12
- Enrollment: 2,026 (2024–2025)
- Student to teacher ratio: 11.91
- Colors: Purple & Gold
- Athletics conference: UIL Class 5A
- Mascot: Panther/Lady Panther
- Rival: Longview High School Nacogdoches High School
- Yearbook: Fang
- Website: Lufkin High School

Lufkin High School is a public high school located in Lufkin, Texas and is classified as a 5A school by the University Interscholastic League. It is part of the Lufkin Independent School District that serves the Lufkin area and central Angelina County. During 2023–2024, Lufkin High School had an enrollment of 2,101 students and a student to teacher ratio of 11.97. The school received an overall rating of "B" from the Texas Education Agency for the 2024–2025 school year.

== History ==
Following the desegregation of Lufkin ISD in 1971, Lufkin High School and Dunbar High School, the formerly African-American School in Lufkin, consolidated. The current high school building was constructed and opened in 1999. In 2018, a 75 million dollar bond was passed by Lufkin ISD, which included plans for a new sports complex to be constructed at Lufkin High School. The complex officially opened in August 2021. In 2026, a bond passed to replace Abe Martin Stadium.

== Academics ==
- UIL Spelling and Vocabulary Champions
  - 1999 (6A)
- UIL Accounting Champions
  - 2018 (5A)
  - 2019 (5A)

== Athletics ==
Lufkin High School student athletes compete as the Panthers in the following sports:

- Cross Country
- Volleyball
- Football
- Basketball
- Powerlifting
- Swimming
- Soccer
- Tennis
- Golf
- Track
- Softball
- Baseball

=== State titles ===
Lufkin (UIL)

- Marching Band
  - 2016 (5A/6A)
  - 2017 (5A/6)
  - 2019 (5A/6A)
  - 2021 (5A/6A)
  - 2023 (5A/6A)
  - 2024 (5A/6A)
- Baseball
  - 1963 (4A)
- Boys Basketball
  - 1979 (4A)
- Football
  - 2001 (5A)
- Boys Soccer
  - 2015 (5A)

Lufkin Dunbar (PVIL)

- Football
  - 1964 (PVIL-6A), 1966 (PVIL-6A), 1967 (PVIL-6A)

== Fine arts ==
The Lufkin High School Panther Band received the only superior rating of (1,1,1) at all UIL Marching Competitions from 2008 through 2020. The band also won the Military state marching title in 2016, 2017 (6A) and 2019 (5A) at the NAMMB Military State Marching Contest. As well, the band has sent numerous students to the TMEA All State clinic.

== Notable alumni ==
- Bruce Alexander – former NFL player
- Dez Bryant – former Oklahoma State University football player; former Dallas Cowboys Wide receiver
- Carrington Byndom – former Carolina Panthers cornerback
- Keke Coutee - former Texas Tech University football player; current Houston Texans wide receiver
- Rex Hadnot – former University of Houston Offensive guard; former San Diego Chargers Offensive guard. Former placer for the Arizona Cardinals (2010–2011), Cleveland Browns (2008–2009) and Miami Dolphins (2004–2007)
- Ken Houston – Lufkin Dunbar graduate who played for the Washington Redskins (1973–1980) and Houston Oilers (1967–1972); was inducted into the Pro Football Hall of Fame in 1986
- Terrence Kiel, former Texas A&M University and San Diego Chargers safety
- Jorvorskie Lane – former Texas A&M University football player; former Miami Dolphins Fullback; former Tampa Bay Buccaneers fullback; holds Texas state high school record for career rushing touchdowns (49)
- Erik McCoy - NFL center
- Reggie McNeal – former Texas A&M University quarterback; former Cincinnati Bengals wide receiver; former Canadian Football League wide receiver and quarterback
- Don Muhlbach – former Texas A&M University football player; current Detroit Lions deep snapper
- Ja'Lynn Polk – NFL wide receiver for the New England Patriots
- Joe Robb – former Texas Christian University Offensive lineman. Played for the Detroit Lions (1968–1971), St. Louis Cardinals (1961–1967) and Philadelphia Eagles (1959–1960)
- Ryan Rottman – actor
- Pete Runnels – former infielder for the Houston Colt .45's (1963–1964), Boston Red Sox (1958–1962) and Washington Senators (1951–1957)
- Jacoby Shepherd – former NFL cornerback
- Suzy Spencer – journalist and New York Times bestselling author; class of 1972
- T. J. Turner – former NFL defensive end
- Cedric Walker – former professional football player and current coach
- Joe Williams – former NFL player, graduated from Dunbar High School
