= Concord, Angelina County, Texas =

Concord, Texas
- Ghost town
- Location within Texas Location within the United States
- Coordinates: 31°07′25″N 94°15′10″W
- Country: United States
- State: Texas
- County: Angelina
- Elevation: 164 ft (50 m)
- Time zone: UTC-6 (Central (CST))
  - Summer (DST): UTC-5 (CDT)
- Area code: 936
- GNIS feature ID: 1381686

Concord is a ghost town in Angelina County, in the U.S. state of Texas. It is located within the Lufkin, Texas micropolitan area.

== History ==
Concord was established in the late 1850s or early 1860s by Colonel T.L. Mott and his family, who were from Alabama. They named the region after Book of Concord.

By the mid-twentieth century, Concord's church, cemetery had been moved and school district absorbed by the neighboring Zavalla.

== Geography ==
Concord was located 7 mi (11 km) east of Zavalla in eastern Angelina County.

== Education ==
Concord had its school in 1900. Today, the ghost town is located within the Zavalla Independent School District.

== See also ==
- List of ghost towns in Texas
