= Central High School (Pollok, Texas) =

Location
- 7622 North US Highway 69; Pollok, Angelina County, Texas 75969-9710; United States; 31.4296°N 94.8127°W

Information
- School type: Public, high school
- Locale: Rural: Fringe
- School district: Central ISD
- NCES School ID: 481350000846
- Principal: Justin Risner
- Faculty: 34.99 (on an FTE basis)
- Grades: 9–12
- Enrollment: 409 (2023–2024)
- Student to teacher ratio: 11.69
- Colors: Green, Black & White
- Athletics conference: UIL Class AAA
- Mascot: Bulldogs/Lady Dogs
- Yearbook: Bulldog
- Website: Central High School

Central High School is a public high school located in the unincorporated community of Pollok and classified as a 3A school by the UIL. It is part of the Central Independent School District serving students in northwest Angelina County, Texas. During 2023–2024, Central High School had an enrollment of 409 students and a student to teacher ratio of 11.69. The school received an overall rating of "B" from the Texas Education Agency for the 2024–2025 school year.

== Athletics ==
The Central Bulldogs compete in these sports -

- Baseball
- Basketball
- Cross Country
- Golf
- Powerlifting
- Softball
- Track and Field

=== State titles ===
- Baseball -
  - 1983(2A)
- Boys Basketball -
  - 1956(B)
- Girls Basketball -
  - 1959(B), 1984(2A)
- Girls Softball -
  - 1997(3A)
