= Granville, Texas =

- Ghost town
- Location within Texas Location within the United States
- Coordinates: 31°16′53″N 94°50′29″W
- Country: United States
- State: Texas
- County: Angelina
- Elevation: 269 ft (82 m)
- Time zone: UTC-6 (Central (CST))
  - Summer (DST): UTC-5 (CDT)
- Area code: 936
- GNIS feature ID: 1381936

Granville is a ghost town in Angelina County, in the U.S. state of Texas. It is located within the Lufkin, Texas micropolitan area.

== History ==
Granville had a church and a few houses in the 1930s, then had a cemetery and a few scattered houses in the early 1990s.

== Geography ==
Granville was located on Farm to Market Road 2497, 8 mi (13 km) southwest of Lufkin in southwestern Angelina County.

== Education ==
Today, the ghost town is located within the Hudson Independent School District.

== See also ==
- List of ghost towns in Texas
