= Huntington High School (Texas) =

Location
- 952 Gibson Street; Huntington, Angelina County, Texas 75949; United States; 31.265574°N 94.573671°W

Information
- School type: Public, high school
- Locale: Rural: Distant
- School district: Huntington ISD
- NCES School ID: 482400002654
- Principal: Shane Stover
- Staff: 40.09 (on an FTE basis)
- Grades: 9–12
- Enrollment: 512 (2023–2024)
- Student to teacher ratio: 12.77
- Colors: Black & Red
- Athletics conference: UIL Class AAA
- Mascot: Red Devil/Devilette
- Newspaper: Red Devil's Echo
- Website: Huntington High School

Huntington High School is a public high school located in Huntington, Texas (USA) and classified as a 3A school by the UIL. It is part of the Huntington Independent School District located in south central Angelina County. During 2023–2024, Huntington High School had an enrollment of 512 students and a student to teacher ratio of 12.77. The school received an overall rating of "A" from the Texas Education Agency for the 2024–2025 school year.

== Athletics ==
The Huntington Red Devils compete in the following sports

- Baseball
- Basketball
- Cheerleading
- Cross Country
- Golf
- Football
- Powerlifting
- Softball
- Swimming
- Tennis
- Track and Field
- Volleyball

=== State Titles ===
- Boys Basketball
  - 1959(1A), 1960(1A), 1962(B), 1974(1A)
- Softball
  - 2008(3A)
- Girls Basketball

State 3A Runner-up, 2024
