= Huntington High School =

Huntington High School may refer to:

- Huntington High School (Shreveport, Louisiana)
- Huntington High School (New York), Huntington, New York
- Huntington High School (Ohio), Chillicothe, Ohio
- Huntington High School (Texas), Huntington, Texas
- Huntington High School (West Virginia), Huntington, West Virginia
  - Old Huntington High School, one of the two Huntington, West Virginia schools that consolidated in 1996
- Collis P. Huntington High School, Newport News, Virginia

== See also ==
- Huntington North High School, Indiana
- Huntingtown High School, Huntingtown, Maryland
- Huntington School (Oregon), Huntington, Oregon
