= Homer, Texas =

Unincorporated community in Angelina County, Texas, United States

- Unincorporated community
- Location within Texas Location within the United States
- Coordinates: 31°17′21″N 94°38′18″W
- Country: United States
- State: Texas
- County: Angelina
- Elevation: 312 ft (95 m)
- Time zone: UTC-6 (Central (CST))
  - Summer (DST): UTC-5 (CDT)
- Area code: 936
- GNIS feature ID: 1359485

Homer is an unincorporated community in Angelina County, Texas, United States, southeast of Lufkin, in Deep East Texas. It was reported to have a population of approximately 360 in the early 1990s through 2000. It is located within the Lufkin, Texas micropolitan area.

== History ==
Today, Homer is so small that the residents have Lufkin mailing addresses. Also, the majority of the residents consider themselves Lufkin residents, rather than Homer ones.

== Geography ==
Homer is located along U.S. Route 69, 6 mi (9.7 km) southeast of Lufkin on Texas Recreational Road 255, a main thoroughfare to Sam Rayburn Reservoir.

== Education ==
Homer had two schools in 1884. Students study in the Lufkin Independent School District.

== See also ==
- List of unincorporated communities in Texas
