= Allentown, Texas =

Ghost town in Texas, US

Allentown
- Ghost town
- Location in Texas
- Coordinates: 31.44328000°N 94.78292900°W
- Country: United States
- State: Texas
- County: Angelina
- Elevation: 256 ft (78 m)
- USGS Feature ID: 1381362

Aldridge is a ghost town in Angelina County, Texas, United States. Situated on Farm to Market Road 843, it was established by the 1930s. Most of its population left following World War II, and as of 2009, had 800 residents.
