= Jack Tinsley =

American journalist

Jack B. Tinsley
- Born: December 14, 1934; Huntington, Texas, U.S.
- Died: October 12, 2004 (aged 69); Fort Worth, Texas, U.S.
- Occupation: Newspaper editor

Jackson Bennett "Jack" Tinsley (December 14, 1934 – October 12, 2004) was executive editor from 1975 to 1986 of the Fort Worth Star-Telegram, leading the Fort Worth, Texas newspaper to two Pulitzer Prizes.

== Early life and education ==
Tinsley was from Huntington, Texas, the son of Henry Bine Tinsley and Sallie A. Jackson Tinsley. His father was a carpenter. He graduated from Sam Houston State Teachers College.

== Career ==
Shortly after graduation, Tinsley appeared as an actor in the movie 4D Man (1959), and that same year he began as a reporter at the Star-Telegram. During the first five years of his career as a reporter, he covered the Kennedy assassination in 1963 and the 1964 slayings of three Civil Rights workers in Philadelphia, Mississippi. In 1965 he won the National Education Writers Association's top award for a series on academic freedom in Texas.

He became Sunday editor in 1966, then assistant managing editor of new technology and assistant to the editor before settling in as executive editor in 1975. He spent 15 months as editor of a Southwestern Bell in-house publication but otherwise continued with the Star-Telegram until his retirement in December 2000 as vice president for community affairs.

== Personal life ==
Tinsley married fellow journalist Anne Miller in 1965; they had two children. He died in 2004, at a hospital in Fort Worth, from an aortic aneurysm, at age 69.
