= Angelina and Neches River Railroad =

Short-line railroad in Texas, U.S.

Angelina & Neches River Railroad
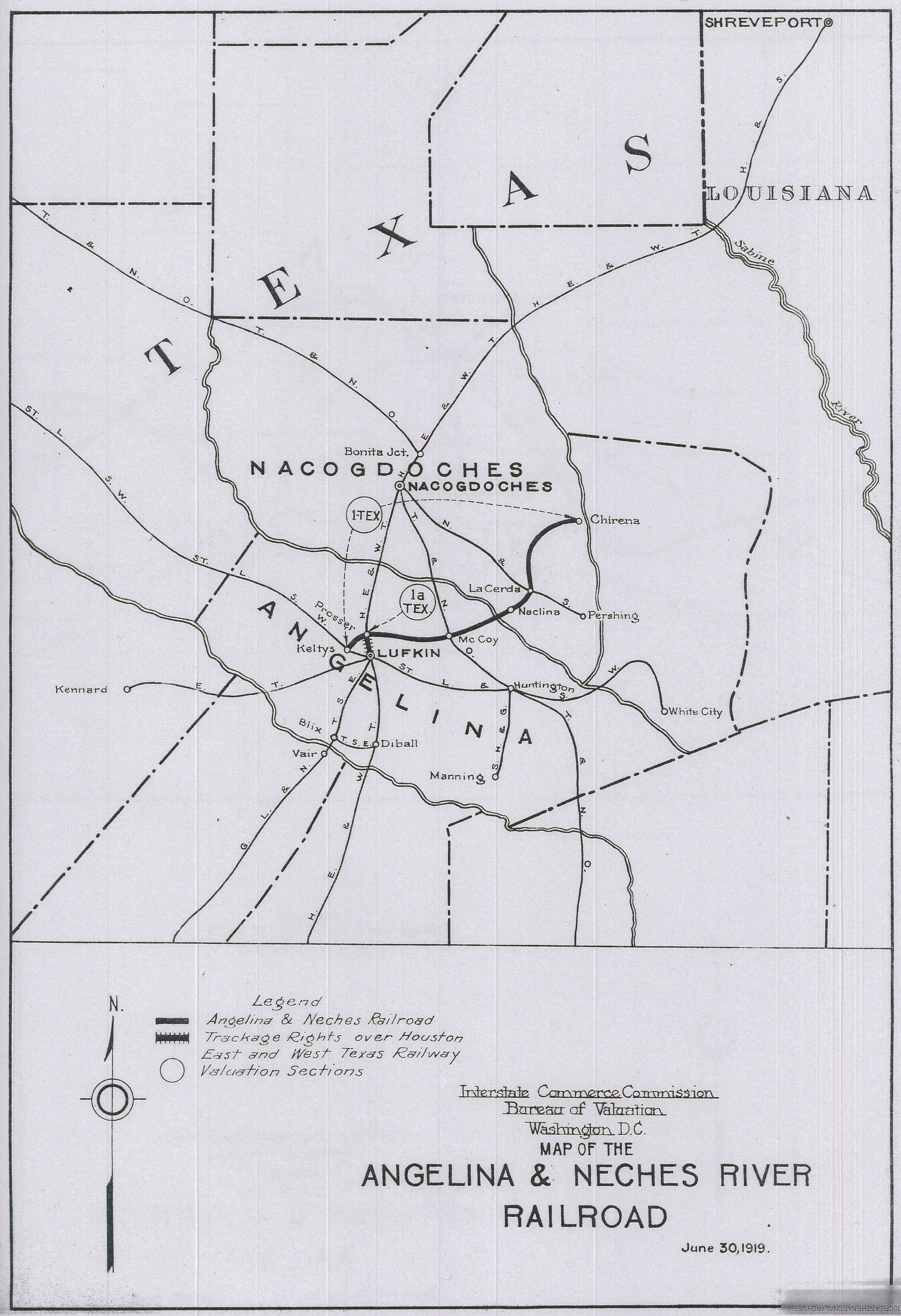
- 1919 map of the railroad

Overview
- Headquarters: Lufkin, Texas
- Reporting mark: ANR
- Locale: Texas
- Dates of operation: 1900–

Technical
- Track gauge: 4 ft 8 1/2 in (1,435 mm) standard gauge
- Track length: 28 miles

Other
- Website: http://www.anrrr.com/ Angelina & Neches River Railroad

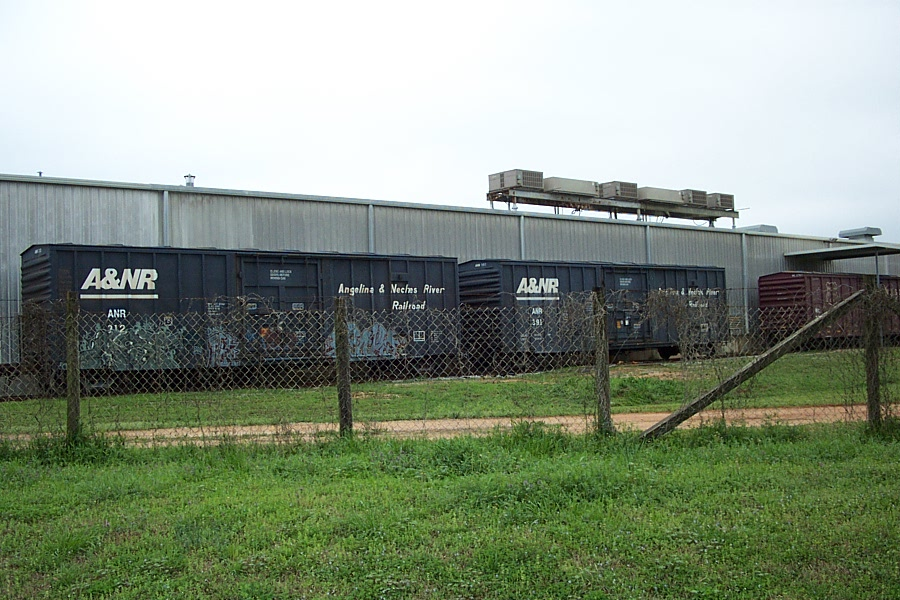
Two Angelina & Neches River Railroad boxcars are seen on a siding near Childersburg, Alabama.

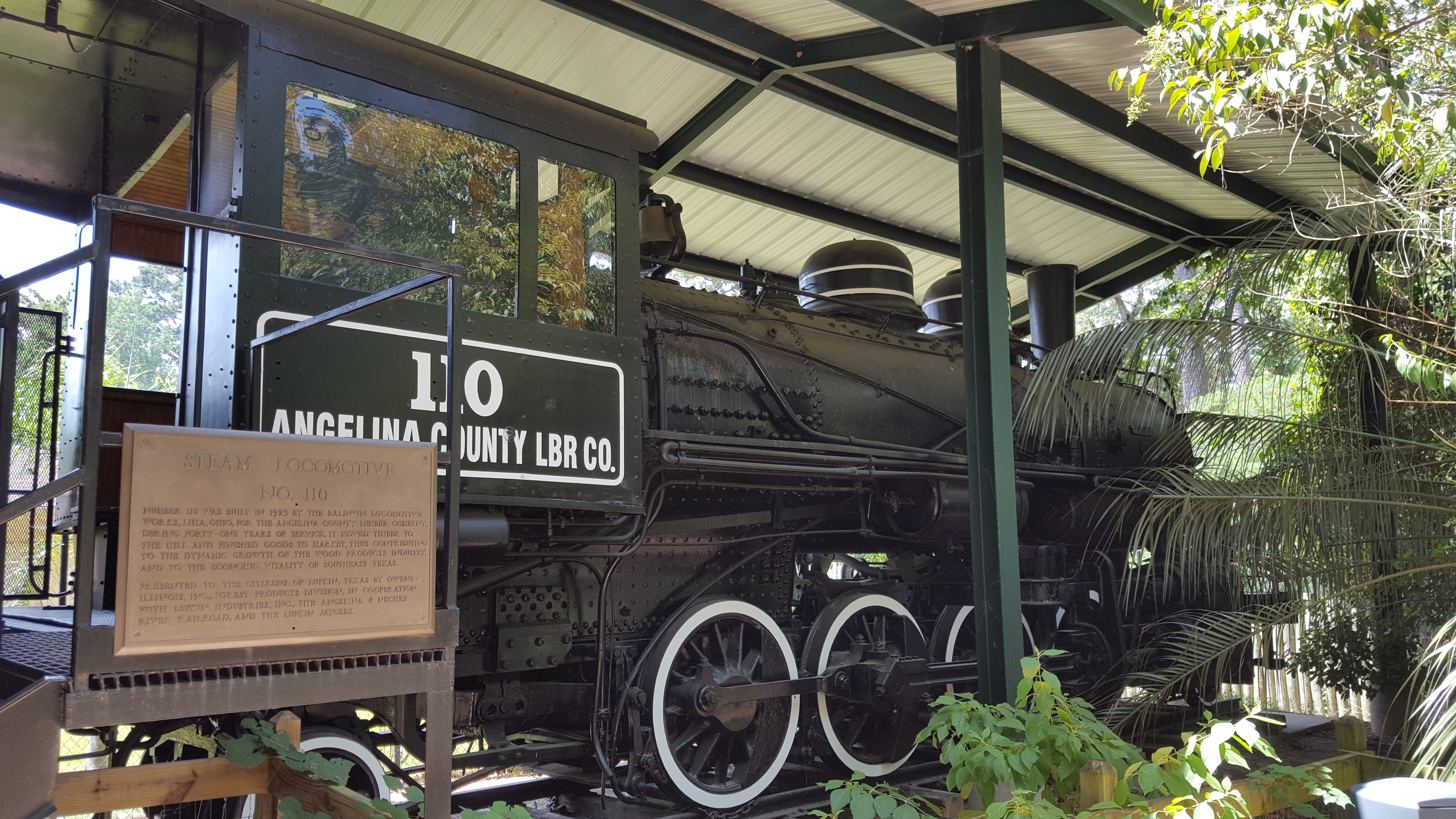
Angelina County Lumber Company Engine #110. Located at the Ellen Trout Zoo in Lufkin, Texas.

The Angelina and Neches River Railroad (reporting mark ANR) (Angelina & Neches River Railroad) is a short-line railroad headquartered in Lufkin, Texas.

ANR operates an 11.6 miles (18.7 km) line from Dunagan, Texas, to an interchange with Union Pacific Railroad at Lufkin. With all owned tracks combined, the company owns and operates 28 miles of track plus 3.5 miles through trackage rights with Union Pacific. ANR traffic includes lumber, foundry products, paper, plywood, chemicals, limestone, scrap iron, steel, and clay.

ANR's predecessor was founded in the 1800s by Angelina County Lumber Company as a logging route, and at its peak operated over 30 miles (48 km) of railroad. It also operates short portions of lines formerly belonging to the East Texas Railroad and the Texas Southeastern Railroad as well as the original Cotton Belt line from Lufkin to the middle of Clawson, Texas.
