= Clawson, Texas =

- Unincorporated community
- Location within Texas Location within the United States
- Coordinates: 31°24′03″N 94°47′34″W
- Country: United States
- State: Texas
- County: Angelina
- Elevation: 361 ft (110 m)
- Time zone: UTC-6 (Central (CST))
  - Summer (DST): UTC-5 (CDT)
- Area code: 936
- GNIS feature ID: 1381647

Clawson is an unincorporated community in Angelina County, in the U.S. state of Texas. According to the Handbook of Texas, it had a population of 195 in 2000. It is located within the Lufkin, Texas micropolitan area.

== Geography ==
Clawson is located at the intersection of U.S. Highway 69 and Farm to Market Road 2021, 6 mi (9.7 km) northwest of Lufkin in northwestern Angelina County.

== Education ==
Clawson had its own school around 1890. Today, the community is served by the Central Independent School District.
