= Angelina College =

Community college in Lufkin, Texas, US

Coordinates: 31.2872°N 94.7307°W

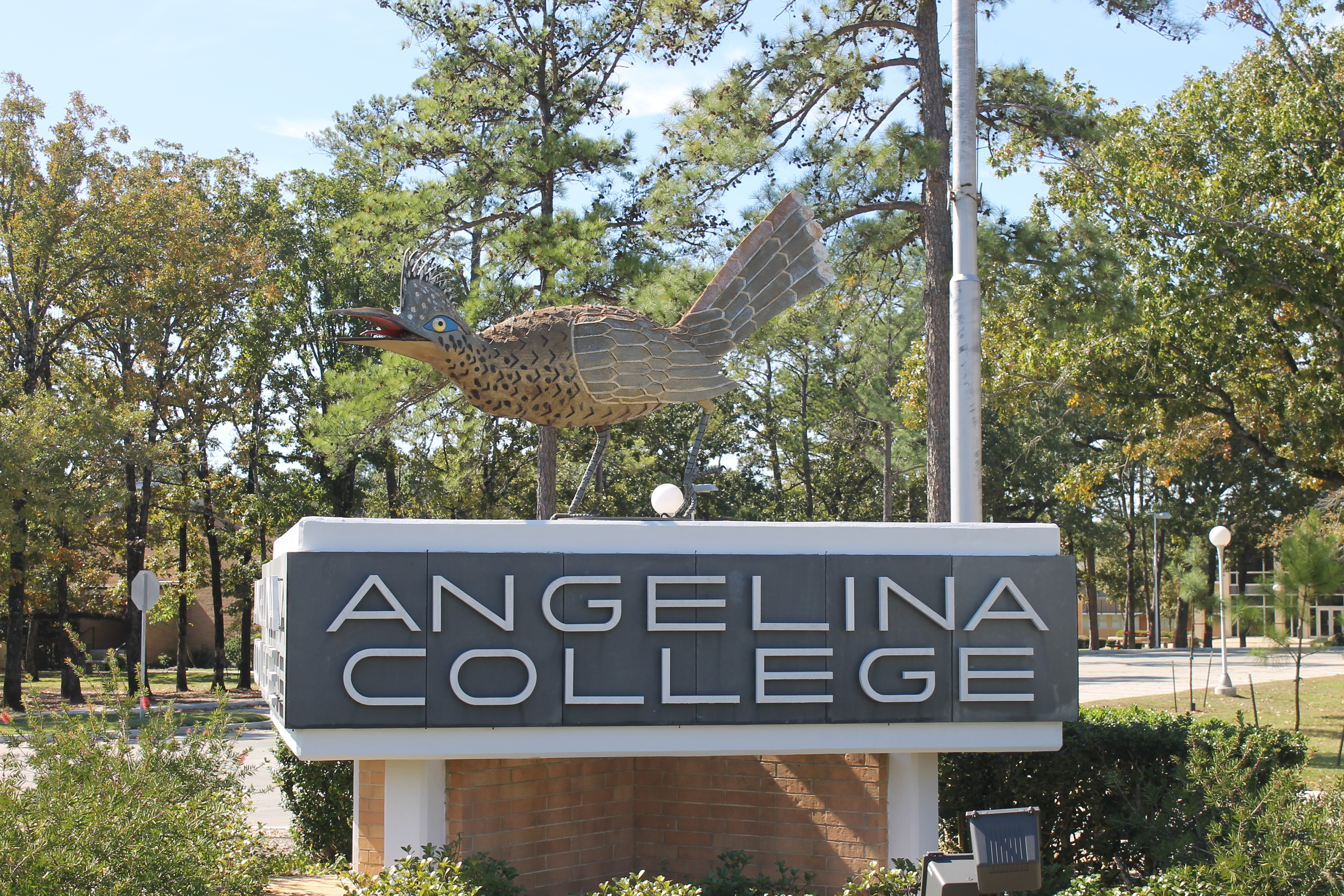
- Motto: Invest In Yourself. Invest In Your Future.
- Type: Public community college
- Established: 1966
- President: Michael Simon
- Administrative staff: 340
- Undergraduates: 3,896 (2023)
- Location: Lufkin, Texas, United States
- Campus: Small city
- Colors: Royal blue, columbia blue, orange, and white
- Nickname: Roadrunners

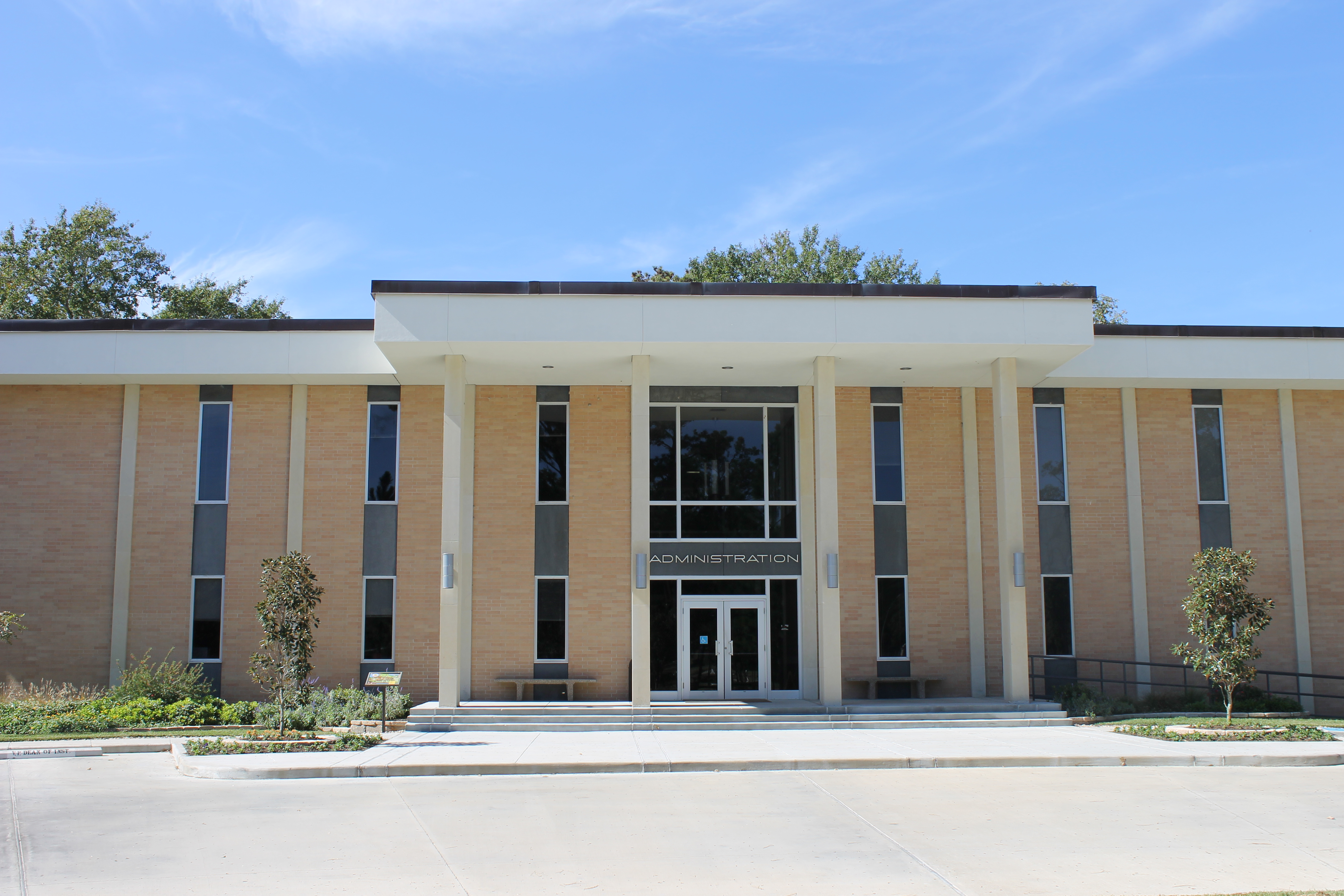
Angelina College Administration Building

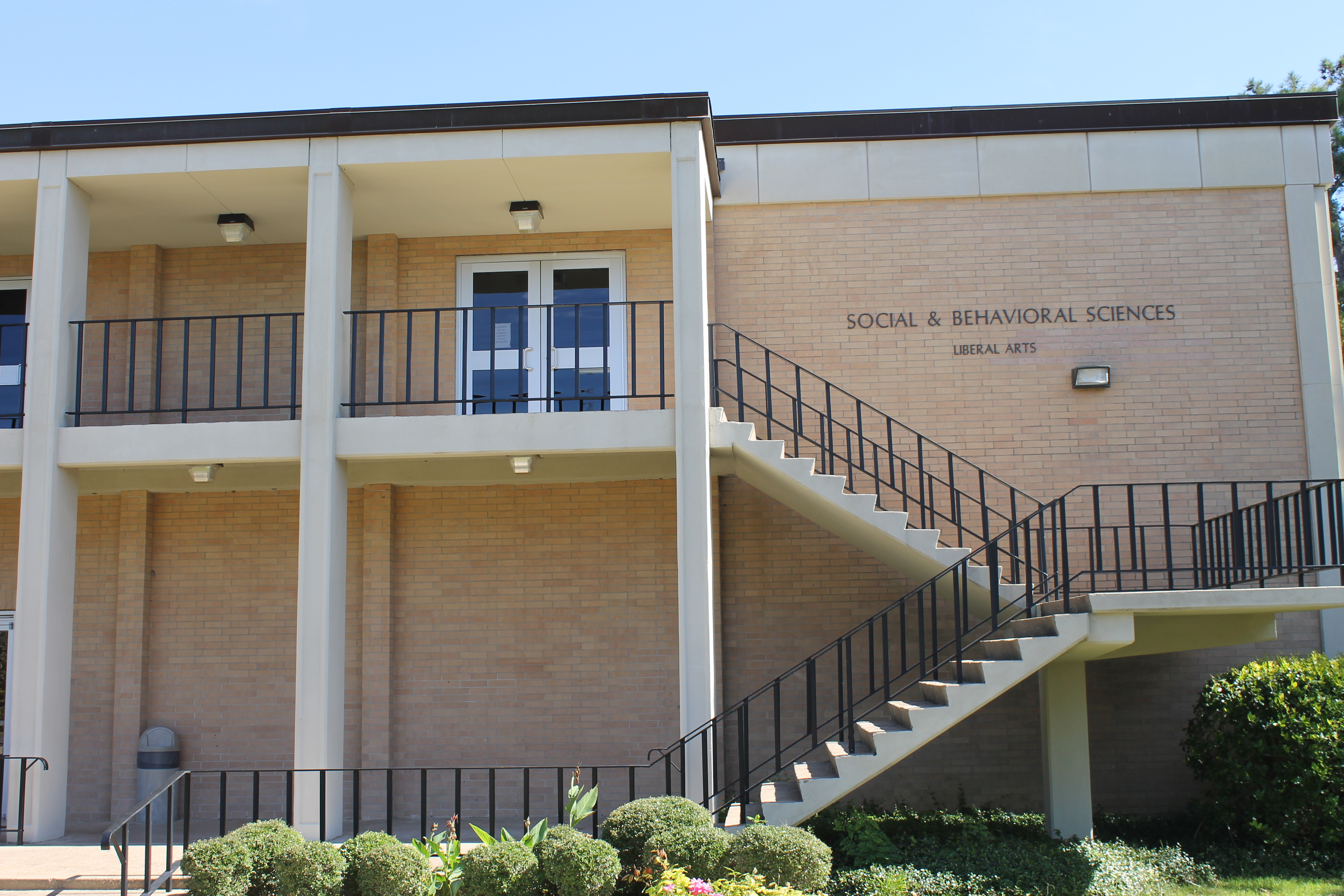
Social and Behavioral Sciences Building

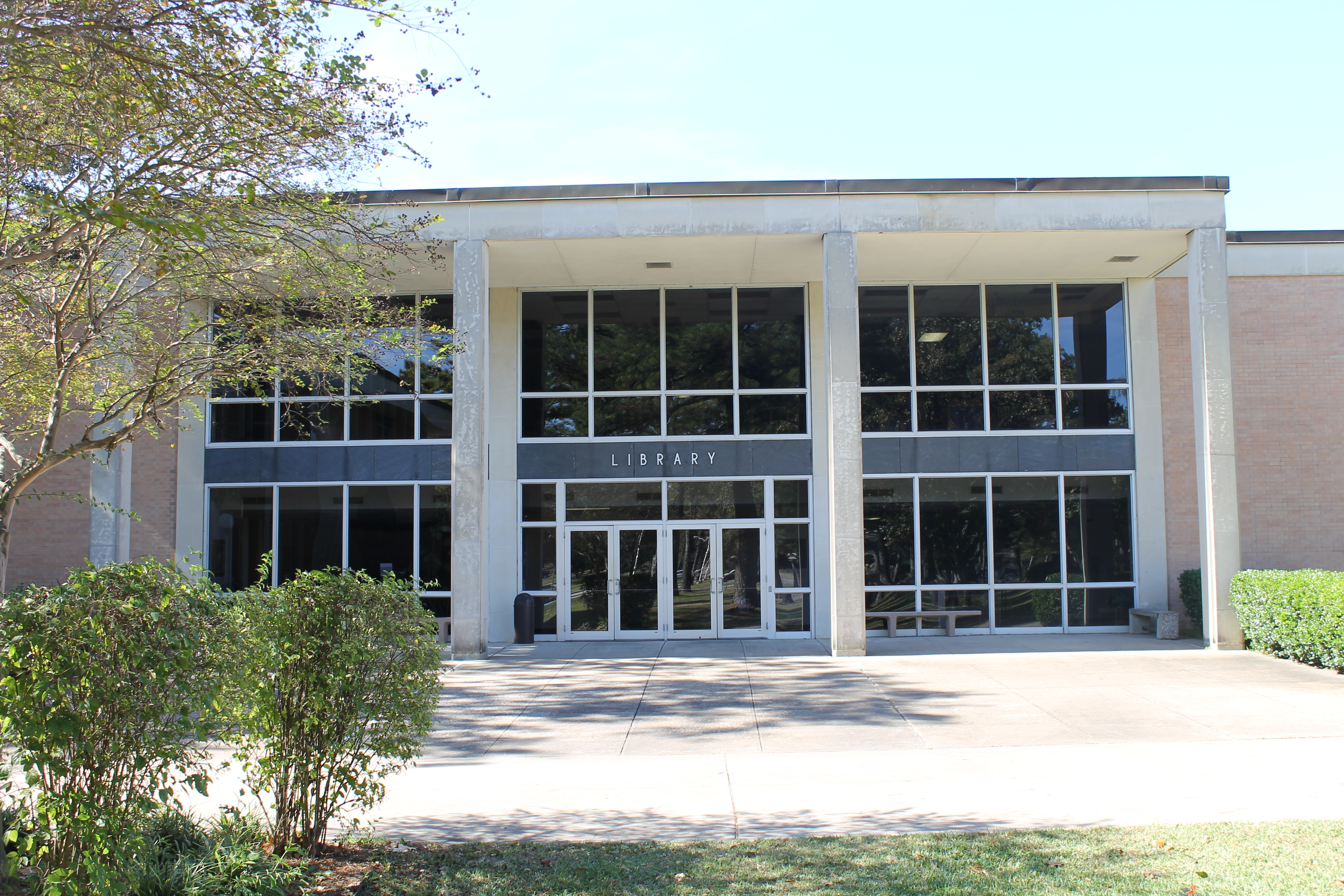
Angelina College Library

Angelina College is a public community college with its main campus in Lufkin, Texas. The college enrolls more than 4,000 students in its undergraduate degree programs. In addition to its academic/vocational programs, the college has a community services division that oversees the college's Adult Education Consortium, Continuing Education Units, and Career Development initiatives.

== History ==
Angelina College was founded on September 24, 1966, with construction of the original seven-building campus starting in November 1967. It first opened its doors to students in the fall of 1968.

Jack Hudgins was elected the first president of Angelina College on December 12, 1966, by the trustees. Hudgins stepped down in 1991 and was succeeded by Larry Phillips. Hudgins remained on campus as a part-time music instructor. To honor his tenure as the president, the Fine Arts Building was renamed Hudgins Hall in 2001.

In 2015, Michael Simon succeeded Phillips as president, making him the third president of the college.

== Campus ==
College buildings include:

- Administration
- Student Center
- Angelina Center for the Arts and Temple Theater
- Temple Hall (business)
- Hudgins Hall (liberal and fine arts)
- Liberal Arts
- Science and Mathematics
- Technology and Workforce Development Center
- Health Careers I & II
- Social & Behavioral Sciences
- Community Services Center
- Shands Gymnasium
- Angelina College Library
- Angelina College Police Department
- Angelina College Small Business Development Center
- Larry Phillips Sports Complex

The Lufkin campus has a dormitory for students.

== Academics ==
The college offers a transfer core curriculum and associate's degrees in occupational programs, certificates, and associate of applied sciences degrees, programs or classes in community services (noncredit) that lead to certifications or licensure, adult education, GED, and ESL courses. Angelina College enrolls more than 4,000 students with the majority of those attending class on campus.

Angelina College is accredited by the Southern Association of Colleges and Schools to award the associate of arts, associate of science, and associate of applied science degrees. In addition, it offers certificates and degrees in various programs tailored toward the local economy, especially programs in the medical field such as respiratory care, radiology, EMS, nursing (vocational and a two-year RN program), pharmacy technician, and surgical technician.

=== Divisions ===
Programs in the college are organized into these schools of instruction/divisions:

- Business and Technology
- Arts and Education
- Liberal Arts
- Health Careers
- Science and Mathematics
- Workforce and Continuing Education

== Service area ==
As defined by the Texas Legislature, the official service area of Angelina College is:

- all of Angelina, Houston, Nacogdoches, Polk, Sabine, San Augustine, Trinity, and Tyler Counties,
- the Alto and Wells school districts, located within Cherokee County,
- the Burkeville and Newton school districts, located within Newton County,
- the Jasper Independent School District, located within Jasper County,
- the Coldspring-Oakhurst and Shepherd school districts, located within San Jacinto County (note that the Texas Education Code has Shepherd misspelled as "Shepard"),
- the portion of the Brookeland Independent School District located within Newton and Jasper Counties,
- the portion of the Colmesneil Independent School District located within Jasper County, and
- the portion of the Trinity Independent School District located within Walker County.

== Athletics ==
The school colors are royal blue, Columbia blue, orange, and white, and the school mascot is the Roadrunner. Angelina College competes in the NJCAA Region XIV Texas Eastern Conference in men's and women's basketball, baseball, softball, and soccer.

== Notable people ==
- Clay Buchholz, professional baseball player
- Mark Calaway, professional wrestler known as The Undertaker in World Wrestling Entertainment
- Andrew Cashner, professional baseball player
- Dennis Cook, professional baseball player
- Lamont Mack, professional basketball player
- Natasha Mack, professional basketball player
- Kimberly Clark Saenz, serial killer
- Josh Tomlin, professional baseball player
