= Atoy, Texas =

Unincorporated community in Cherokee County, Texas, United States

- Unincorporated community
- Location within the state of Texas Atoy (the United States)
- Coordinates: 31°46′27″N 95°0′48″W
- Country: United States
- State: Texas
- County: Cherokee
- Elevation: 279 ft (85 m)
- Time zone: UTC-6 (Central (CST))
  - Summer (DST): UTC-5 (CDT)
- Area codes: 430, 903

Atoy is a small unincorporated community in east-southeast Cherokee County, Texas United States, located between Rusk and the Angelina River, along Farm to Market Road 343. It lies at an elevation of 279 feet (85 m).

== See also ==
- List of unincorporated communities in Texas
