= Loyola Cultural Action Foundation =

Bolivian network of radio stations

Coordinates: 19°2′45.41″S 65°15′41.5″W

- Acción Cultural Loyola
- Abbreviation: ACLO
- Formation: 1966
- Purpose: Socioeconomic development of indigenous people
- Location: 602 Arenales, Sucre, Bolivia
- Region served: Bolivia
- Official language: Quechua, Spanish
- Director General: Fernando Alvarado
- Affiliations: Jesuit, Catholic
- Website: ACLO

Loyola Cultural Action Foundation (Spanish: Acción Cultural Loyola; ACLO) is a network of radio stations in southeast and southcentral Bolivia founded by the Jesuits in 1966, with headquarters in Sucre. It serves the largely indigenous people of this region and has included literacy in its programming from the start. It is currently involved in advocacy and education for participatory democracy in a plurinational state. It has undertaken direct action programs to strengthen community organizations and community-based media.

== Programming ==
Programming is broadcast in the indigenous Quechuan language, but staff are required to prepare scripts in Spanish. The programming is primarily entertainment oriented. In 1990, the network started broadcasting the farmer education program Tornavuelta.

== History ==
ACLO's roots go back to the Catholic bishops of Latin America at Medellín adopting the option for the poor recommended by the Second Vatican Council (1962–1965). In Bolivia in the 1960s the indigenous farmers were marginalized, with 69% illiteracy and little access to healthcare or government services. ACLO used literacy education to make the peasants aware to their own situation and their options. The education was carried on through ACLO's radio stations in Chuquisaca (1971), Potosí (1975), Yamparáeza (1977), and Tarija (1981), along with the newspaper En Marcha.

ACLO has been described as one of the few independent media outlets that covered the 2006 Bolivian Constituent Assembly.

== Affiliates ==
- 91.5 FM in Entre Ríos, Tarija
- 92.1 FM in Uriondo
