= Alco, Louisiana =

Unincorporated community in Louisiana, U.S.

Coordinates: 31°20′04″N 93°07′51″W

Alco was a sawmill town in Vernon Parish, Louisiana, United States. It was located on the Red River and Gulf Railroad, 50 miles from Alexandria.

== History ==
Alco was named after the Alexandria Lumber Company, which built a sawmill there. It was originally considered part of the same community as Kurthwood, which was three miles away, and was served by a post office called Grant and renamed Nona, until the sawmills were built.

In 1922, the Alexandria Lumber Company announced that it was shutting down its sawmill in Pineville and moving some of its machinery to its new plant in Alco, Vernon Parish.

In June 1923, The Shreveport Journal reported that the Ku Klux Klan would be holding a meeting and barbecue in Alco, Vernon Parish, with a special train running from Lecompte to Alco. The event was to bring together seven Klans, specifically from Alexandria, DeRidder, Glenmora, Bunkie, Leesville, Oakdale, and Alco.

The Alco community had both a Methodist church and a Baptist church.
