= Pollok, Texas =

- Unincorporated community
- Location within Texas Location within the United States
- Coordinates: 31°26′57.58″N 94°51′32.92″W
- Country: United States
- State: Texas
- County: Angelina
- Elevation: 305 ft (93 m)
- Time zone: UTC-6 (Central (CST))
  - Summer (DST): UTC-5 (CDT)
- Area code: 936
- GNIS feature ID: 1382545

Pollok is an unincorporated community in Angelina County, Texas, United States. According to the Handbook of Texas, the community had a population of 300 in 2000. It is located within the Lufkin, Texas micropolitan area.

The ZIP Code is 75969.

== Geography ==
=== Climate ===
The climate in this area is characterized by hot, humid summers and generally mild to cool winters. According to the Köppen Climate Classification system, Pollok has a humid subtropical climate.

== Education ==
A church built in the community in 1899 was also used as a school. The Central Independent School District serves area students.

== Media ==
KLTV and KTRE maintain studios and radio transmitters in the community.
