= Angelina County, Texas =

County in the United States

- County
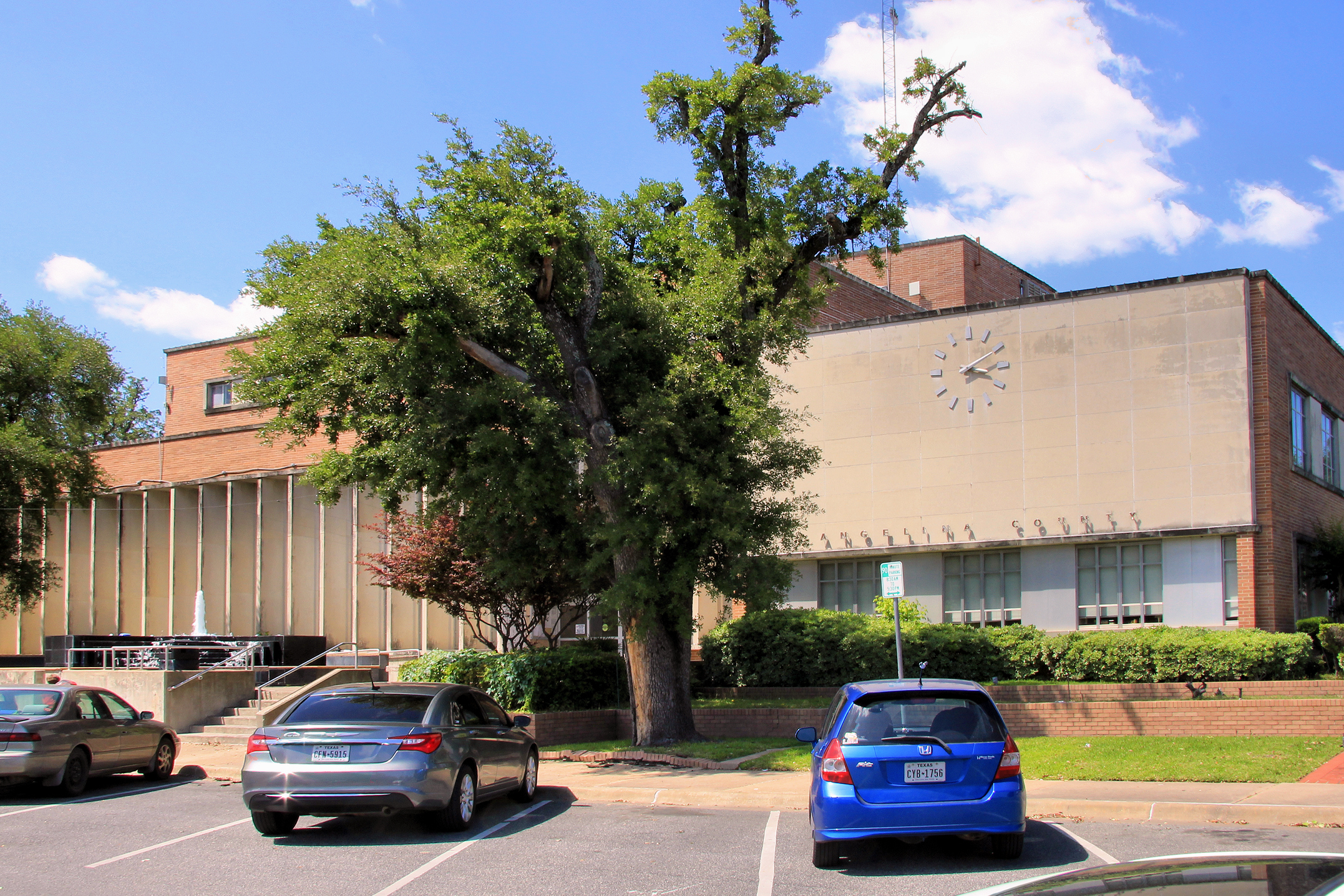
- The Angelina County Courthouse in Lufkin

- Seal

- Location within the U.S. state of Texas
- Coordinates: 31°16′N 94°37′W
- Country: United States
- State: Texas
- Founded: 1846
- Named for: A Hasinai woman who assisted early Spanish missionaries and was called Angelina by them
- Seat: Lufkin
- Largest city: Lufkin

Area
  - Total: 865 sq mi (2,240 km^{2})
  - Land: 798 sq mi (2,070 km^{2})
  - Water: 67 sq mi (170 km^{2}) 7.7%

Population (2020)
  - Total: 86,395
  - Estimate (2025): 88,154 ▲
  - Density: 108/sq mi (41.8/km^{2})
- Time zone: UTC−6 (Central)
  - Summer (DST): UTC−5 (CDT)
- Congressional district: 17th
- Website: www.angelinacounty.net

Angelina County (/ˌændʒəˈliːnə/ AN-jə-LEE-nə) is a county located in the U.S. state of Texas. It is in East Texas and its county seat is Lufkin.

As of the 2020 census, the population was 86,395. The Lufkin, TX Micropolitan Statistical Area includes all of Angelina County.

It was formed in 1846 from Nacogdoches County. It is named for a Hasinai Native American woman who assisted early Spanish missionaries and was called Angelina by them.

== History ==
The county's first Anglo settlers were what John Nova Lomax described as "Scotch-Irish backwoods folk." Cotton farmers and slaves did not come to Angelina County because it had poor soil. Lomax added that "Culturally, the county was less moonlight-and-magnolias Dixie than a little pocket of Appalachia, where pioneers, often from similarly hardscrabble areas of Georgia, Alabama and Mississippi, wanted nothing more than to carve homesteads out of the Piney Woods and river thickets, farm a little, maybe raise a scraggly herd of tough cattle to drive to market in New Orleans." Lomax added that "[t]hey also wanted to brew up a little whiskey and subsist on the bass, catfish and perch they hauled from the Neches and Angelina rivers and whatever they could trap and shoot on dry land."

Settlement was still thin when Texas won its independence. Angelina County was organized on April 22, 1846, when Nacogdoches County was divided. The first permanent settler after the county was formed is thought to have been George W. Collins. The population increased quickly thereafter due to the good farming land and to the rivers, which made steamboat transportation possible. The population reached 1,165, of whom 196 were slaves, in 1850. The first county seat was Marion; successively, Jonesville became county seat in 1854, Homer in 1858, and Lufkin in 1892. Lufkin was favored by the route of the Houston, East and West Texas Railway (now the Southern Pacific), which had been built in 1882 from Houston to Shreveport.

Angelina County was settled predominantly by natives of the southern United States, some of them slaveowners who established plantations in their new Texas home. Large plantations were owned by the Stearns, Oates, Kalty, Stovall, and Ewing families. However, many Angelina County farmers were relatively poor men who owned no slaves. In 1847 slaves numbered 154, out of a total population of 834. In 1859 the number of slaves had grown to 427, valued at $269,550, and the total population was 4,271. Cotton culture, however, occupied only 2,048 acres of county land in 1858, a relatively small area for East Texas. Between 1850 and 1860 improved land in the county increased from about 3,000 to about 16,000 acres.

In 1861 Angelina County was the only county in East Texas, and one of only a handful of other Texas counties, to reject secession. This election result was startling when compared with that of Angelina County's neighbor to the immediate south, Tyler County, which supported secession by a 99 percent vote. Angelina County had also given the Constitutional Union party candidate, John Bell, a strong minority vote in the 1860 election. Two companies of county men were organized to fight in the Civil War, but they saw only limited action; only nineteen Angelina County men lost their lives in the war, and no Union soldiers entered the county before 1866.

== Geography ==
According to the U.S. Census Bureau, the county has a total area of 865 square miles (2,240 km^{2}), of which 798 square miles (2,070 km^{2}) is land and 67 square miles (170 km^{2}) (7.7%) is water.

=== Adjacent counties ===
- Nacogdoches County (north)
- San Augustine County (northeast)
- Jasper County (southeast)
- Tyler County (south)
- Polk County (southwest)
- Trinity County (west)
- Houston County (west)
- Cherokee County (northwest)

=== National protected area ===
- Angelina National Forest (part)

== Demographics ==
Historical population
Census	Pop.	Note	%±
1850	1,165		—
1860	4,271		266.6%
1870	3,985		−6.7%
1880	5,239		31.5%
1890	6,306		20.4%
1900	13,481		113.8%
1910	17,705		31.3%
1920	22,287		25.9%
1930	27,803		24.7%
1940	32,201		15.8%
1950	36,032		11.9%
1960	39,814		10.5%
1970	49,349		23.9%
1980	64,172		30.0%
1990	69,884		8.9%
2000	80,130		14.7%
2010	86,771		8.3%
2020	86,395		−0.4%
2025 (est.)	88,154	▲	2.0%
U.S. Decennial Census; 1850–1900 1910; 1920 1930 1940; 1950 1960 1970; 1980 1990 2000; 2010 2020

=== 2020 census ===
As of the 2020 census, the county had a population of 86,395. The median age was 39.0 years. 24.7% of residents were under the age of 18 and 17.8% of residents were 65 years of age or older. For every 100 females there were 95.5 males, and for every 100 females age 18 and over there were 92.9 males age 18 and over.

The racial makeup of the county was 63.5% White, 15.2% Black or African American, 0.7% American Indian and Alaska Native, 1.1% Asian, <0.1% Native Hawaiian and Pacific Islander, 9.9% from some other race, and 9.6% from two or more races. Hispanic or Latino residents of any race comprised 22.8% of the population.

48.1% of residents lived in urban areas, while 51.9% lived in rural areas.

There were 32,134 households in the county, of which 33.4% had children under the age of 18 living in them. Of all households, 48.1% were married-couple households, 17.2% were households with a male householder and no spouse or partner present, and 29.1% were households with a female householder and no spouse or partner present. About 26.2% of all households were made up of individuals and 11.9% had someone living alone who was 65 years of age or older.

There were 36,480 housing units, of which 11.9% were vacant. Among occupied housing units, 66.3% were owner-occupied and 33.7% were renter-occupied. The homeowner vacancy rate was 1.3% and the rental vacancy rate was 10.0%.

=== Racial and ethnic composition ===
Angelina County, Texas – Racial and ethnic composition Note: the US Census treats Hispanic/Latino as an ethnic category. This table excludes Latinos from the racial categories and assigns them to a separate category. Hispanics/Latinos may be of any race.
Race / Ethnicity (NH = Non-Hispanic)	Pop 1980	Pop 1990	Pop 2000	Pop 2010	Pop 2020	% 1980	% 1990	% 2000	% 2010	% 2020
White alone (NH)	50,264	52,777	55,615	54,889	49,970	78.33%	75.52%	69.41%	63.26%	57.84%
Black or African American alone (NH)	9,583	10,551	11,656	12,840	12,872	14.93%	15.10%	14.55%	14.80%	14.90%
Native American or Alaska Native alone (NH)	84	144	173	255	200	0.13%	0.21%	0.22%	0.29%	0.23%
Asian alone (NH)	137	259	524	744	891	0.21%	0.37%	0.65%	0.86%	1.03%
Native Hawaiian or Pacific Islander alone (NH)	x	x	15	9	30	x	x	0.02%	0.01%	0.03%
Other race alone (NH)	57	81	20	94	196	0.09%	0.12%	0.02%	0.11%	0.23%
Mixed race or Multiracial (NH)	x	x	631	795	2,504	x	x	0.79%	0.92%	2.90%
Hispanic or Latino (any race)	4,047	6,072	11,496	17,145	19,732	6.31%	8.69%	14.35%	19.76%	22.84%
Total	64,172	69,884	80,130	86,771	86,395	100.00%	100.00%	100.00%	100.00%	100.00%

=== 2000 census ===
Age pyramid as of the 2000 United States census

As of the 2000 census, there were 80,130 people, 28,685 households, and 21,255 families residing in the county. The population density was 100 people per square mile (39 people/km^{2}). There were 32,435 housing units at an average density of 40 units per square mile (15/km^{2}). The racial makeup of the county was 75.10% White, 14.72% Black or African American, 0.30% Native American, 0.67% Asian, 0.02% Pacific Islander, 7.77% from other races, and 1.42% from two or more races. 14.35% of the population were Hispanic or Latino of any race.

There were 28,685 households, out of which 36.10% had children under the age of 18 living with them, 57.80% were married couples living together, 12.30% had a female householder with no husband present, and 25.90% were non-families. 22.80% of all households were made up of individuals, and 9.80% had someone living alone who was 65 years of age or older. The average household size was 2.70 and the average family size was 3.18.

In the county, the population was spread out, with 27.70% under the age of 18, 9.70% from 18 to 24, 28.60% from 25 to 44, 21.50% from 45 to 64, and 12.60% who were 65 years of age or older. The median age was 34 years. For every 100 females there were 96.40 males. For every 100 females age 18 and over, there were 93.70 males.

The median income for a household in the county was $33,806, and the median income for a family was $39,505. Males had a median income of $30,373 versus $20,221 for females. The per capita income for the county was $15,876. About 12.40% of families and 15.80% of the population were below the poverty line, including 21.90% of those under age 18 and 12.30% of those age 65 or over.

== Government and infrastructure ==
The Angelina County Sheriff's Office is the county law enforcement agency. The sheriff is Tom Selman.

Angelina County is governed by its commissioners court, which Keith Wright presides over as county judge.

It is a "partly-wet" county, with beer and wine generally authorized for off-premises consumption. However, the small community of Burke voted to restrict alcohol sales only to restaurants holding permits.

=== Commissioners Court ===
Under Texas state law, each county is governed by a commissioners court with one countywide elected judge and four precinct-level elected commissioners. Republicans currently hold a 4–1 majority on the Angelina County Commissioners Court.

Current composition of the Angelina County Commissioners Court
Precinct	Name	Affiliation	First elected
Judge	Keith Wright	Republican	2022
1	Tim Sprinkle	Republican	2024
2	Kermit Kennedy	Democratic	2018
3	Tom Berry	Republican	2024
4	Kenneth Jeffrey	Republican	2022

=== Politics ===
United States presidential election results for Angelina County, Texas
Year	Republican		Democratic		Third party(ies)	
Year	No.	%	No.	%	No.	%
1912	45	3.94%	1,068	93.60%	28	2.45%
1916	75	4.27%	1,344	76.54%	337	19.19%
1920	205	7.67%	1,661	62.16%	806	30.16%
1924	333	7.54%	3,914	88.57%	172	3.89%
1928	1,209	34.41%	2,305	65.59%	0	0.00%
1932	287	5.46%	4,962	94.46%	4	0.08%
1936	342	7.97%	3,943	91.91%	5	0.12%
1940	572	8.70%	5,993	91.19%	7	0.11%
1944	1,001	16.97%	4,387	74.38%	510	8.65%
1948	1,000	15.78%	4,377	69.05%	962	15.18%
1952	4,705	43.00%	6,224	56.88%	13	0.12%
1956	5,274	52.24%	4,781	47.36%	41	0.41%
1960	5,169	41.32%	7,046	56.32%	295	2.36%
1964	5,262	39.02%	8,194	60.77%	28	0.21%
1968	4,645	29.16%	5,174	32.48%	6,111	38.36%
1972	11,453	69.04%	4,970	29.96%	166	1.00%
1976	7,223	42.21%	9,750	56.98%	139	0.81%
1980	9,900	48.54%	10,140	49.72%	354	1.74%
1984	14,685	61.62%	9,054	37.99%	92	0.39%
1988	12,738	53.40%	10,849	45.48%	265	1.11%
1992	9,722	36.99%	10,318	39.26%	6,241	23.75%
1996	11,789	46.38%	11,346	44.63%	2,286	8.99%
2000	16,648	61.72%	9,957	36.91%	369	1.37%
2004	18,932	66.75%	9,302	32.80%	130	0.46%
2008	19,569	67.13%	9,379	32.17%	205	0.70%
2012	20,303	71.47%	7,834	27.58%	269	0.95%
2016	21,668	72.44%	7,538	25.20%	705	2.36%
2020	25,076	72.40%	9,143	26.40%	416	1.20%
2024	26,049	75.68%	8,146	23.67%	227	0.66%

United States Senate election results for Angelina County, Texas1
Year	Republican		Democratic		Third party(ies)	
Year	No.	%	No.	%	No.	%
2024	24,994	73.37%	8,382	24.61%	690	2.03%

United States Senate election results for Angelina County, Texas2
Year	Republican		Democratic		Third party(ies)	
Year	No.	%	No.	%	No.	%
2020	24,962	72.66%	8,771	25.53%	622	1.81%

Texas Gubernatorial election results for Angelina County
Year	Republican		Democratic		Third party(ies)	
Year	No.	%	No.	%	No.	%
2022	19,142	77.83%	5,174	21.04%	279	1.13%

John Nova Lomax of the Houston Press said that the residents of Angelina County "were, and are, a self-sufficient breed, good with their hands, bluntly honest and leery of all central authority." (In 1861, Angelina County voted against seceding from the United States, the only East Texas county to do so.) He also said "[t]heir electoral peculiarity continued through the 20th Century." Angelina County was the seat of power of Charlie Wilson, a politician labeled the "Liberal from Lufkin".

The current state representative from Angelina County is Republican Trent Ashby, first elected in 2012.

== Crime ==
In earlier days, criminals established moonshine stands. During the 1970s, some criminals established marijuana farms. As of 2011, the main drug dealing activity was the methamphetamine trade. Allen Hill, formerly of the Angelina County Narcotics Squad, said that the local meth trade is doing more damage to the county than drug couriers passing through the county, crack cocaine, and heroin. According to Hill, many Hispanic drug dealers increasingly sold imported "ice"-style meth made by drug cartels instead of crack cocaine or powdered cocaine, because they make more money than they did selling crack. Hill said that many of the drug dealers claim to be affiliated with Mexican drug cartels or gangs like MS-13.

== Education ==
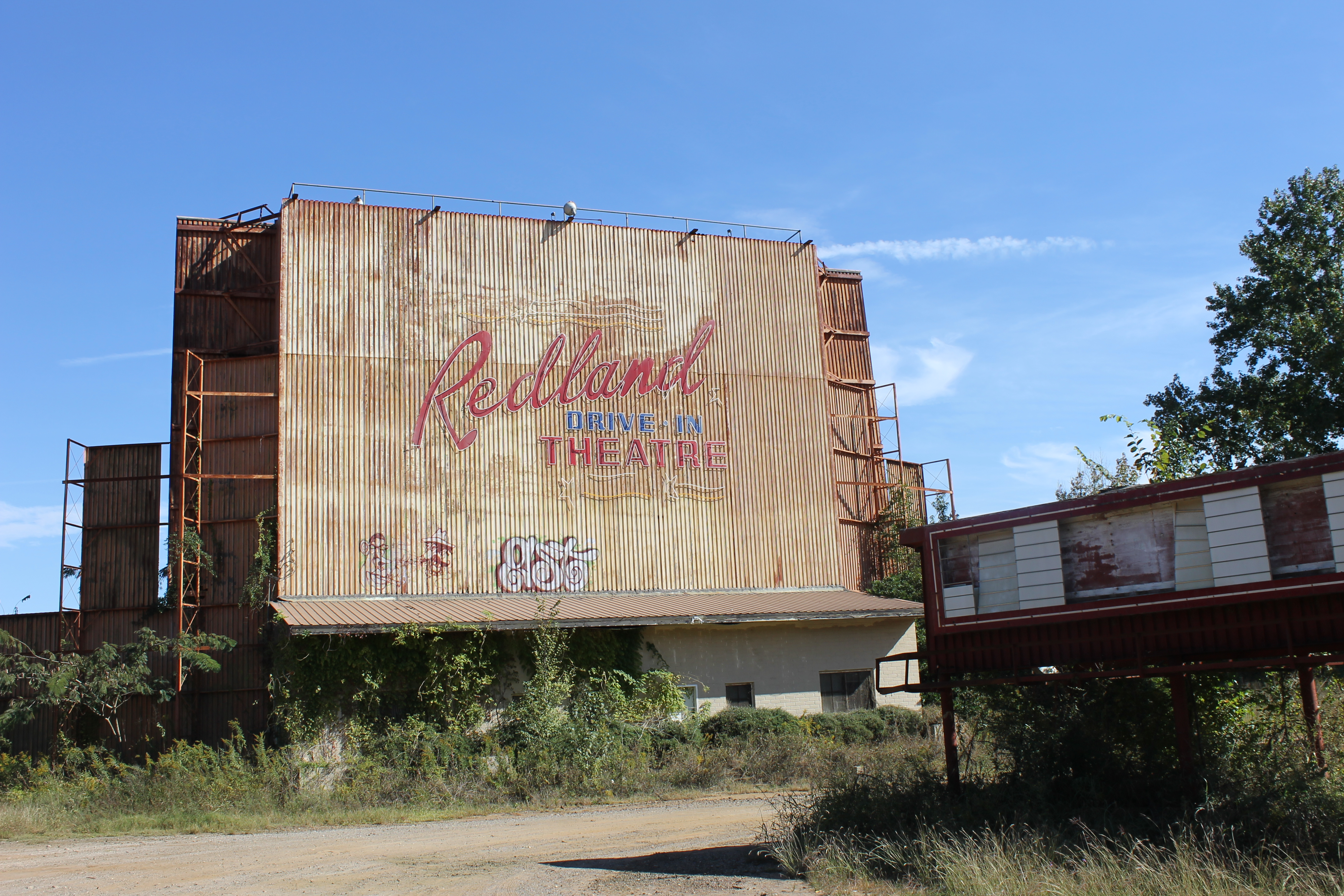
Abandoned Redland Drive-in Theater off U.S. Highway 59 north of Lufkin, prior to demolishment in 2020

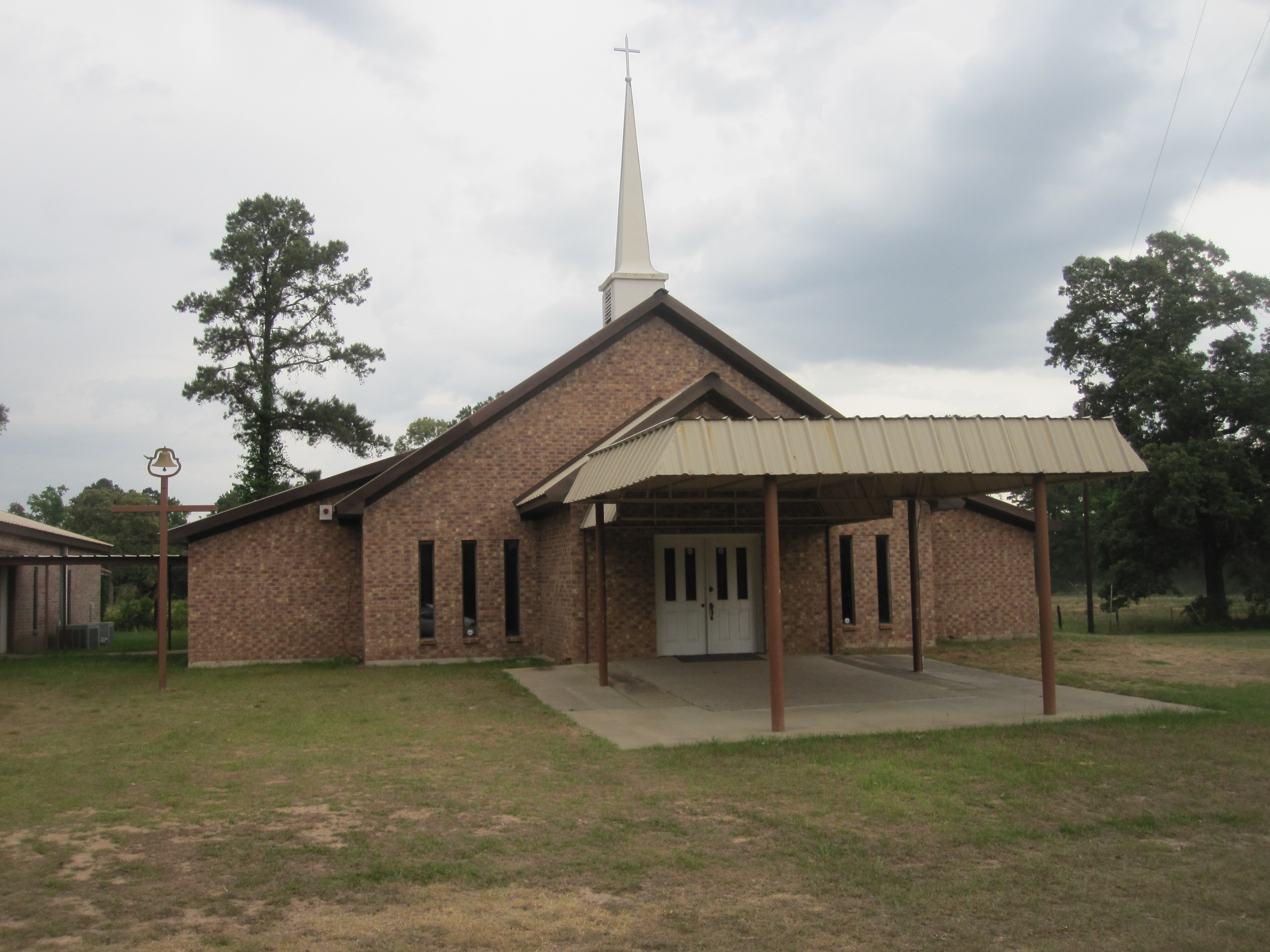
Among numerous rural churches in Angelina County is the Redtown Missionary Baptist Church (pastor Ross Black, 2010) of Pollok, located near the intersection of Texas Highways 103 and 7.

=== Primary and secondary education ===
The following school districts serve Angelina County (districts marked with (*) are located partly within the county and partly outside it):

- Central Independent School District
- Colmesneil Independent School District (*)
- Diboll Independent School District
- Hudson Independent School District
- Huntington Independent School District
- Lufkin Independent School District
- Wells Independent School District (*)
- Zavalla Independent School District

=== Colleges and universities ===
Angelina College, a community college, serves all of Angelina County.

Stephen F. Austin State University is located in Nacogdoches, which is located in neighboring Nacogdoches County.

== Transportation ==
=== Major highways ===
- U.S. Highway 59
  - Interstate 69 is currently under construction and will follow the current route of U.S. 59 in most places.
- U.S. Highway 69
- State Highway 7
- State Highway 63
- State Highway 94
- State Highway 103
- State Highway 147
- Loop 36
- Loop 210
- Loop 287
- Spur 72
- Spur 278
- Spur 339

=== Bus ===
Greyhound Lines operates the Lufkin Station at the Kerrville Bus Company station in Lufkin.

=== Airport ===
Angelina County Airport is located seven miles southwest of Lufkin.

== Communities ==
=== Cities ===
- Burke
- Diboll
- Hudson
- Huntington
- Lufkin (county seat and largest municipality)
- Zavalla

=== Census-designated place ===
- Redland

=== Unincorporated communities ===
- Bald Hill
- Central
- Clawson
- Herty
- Homer
- Moffett
- Pollok

=== Ghost towns ===
- Alco
- Beulah
- Boynton
- Concord
- Dunagan
- Durant
- Ewing
- Granville
- Manning
- Monterey
- Nancy
- Ora
- Peavy
- Platt
- Prairie Grove
- Rocky Springs
- Shawnee

== Gallery ==
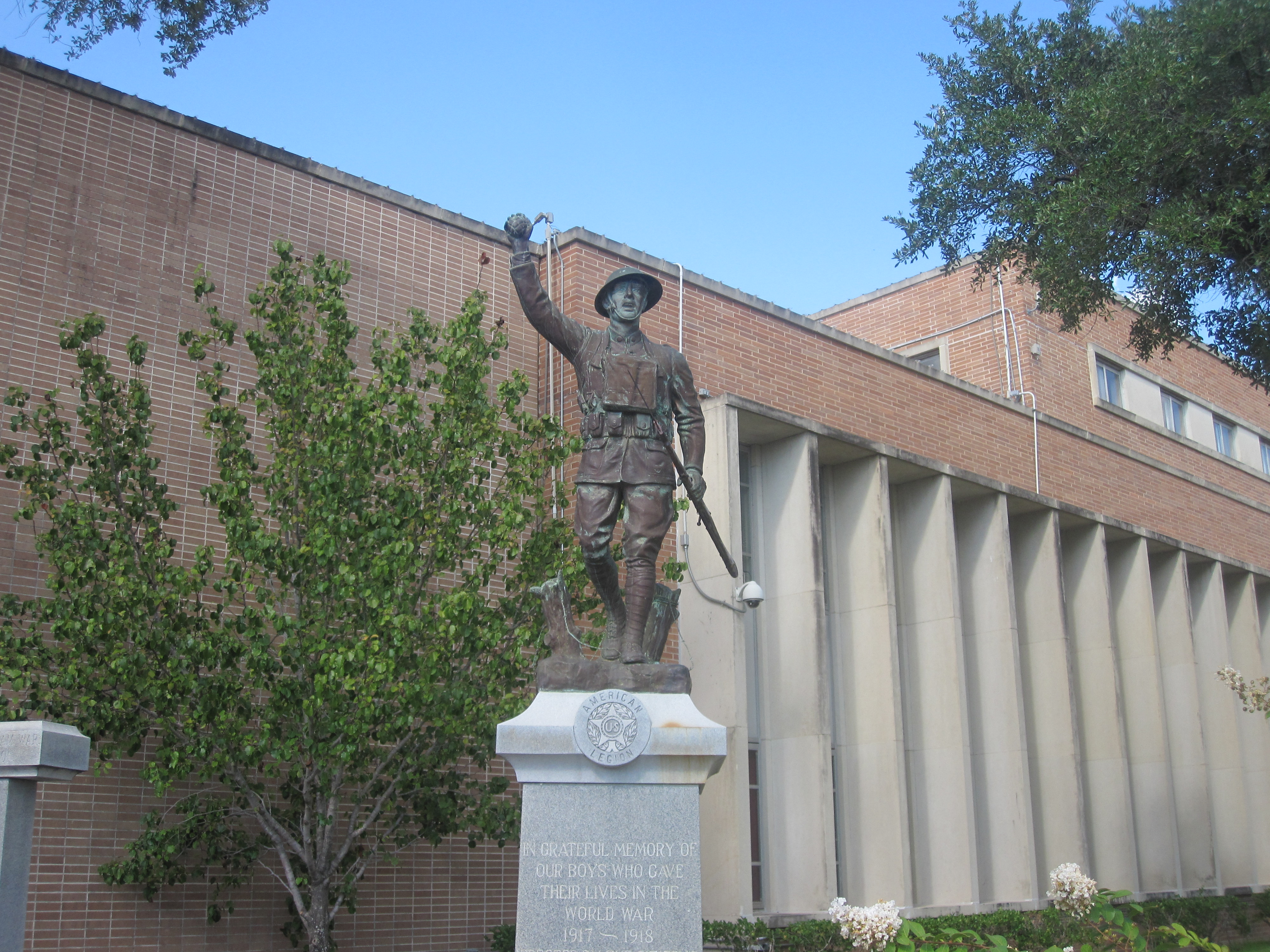
Soldiers Monument at Angelina County Courthouse

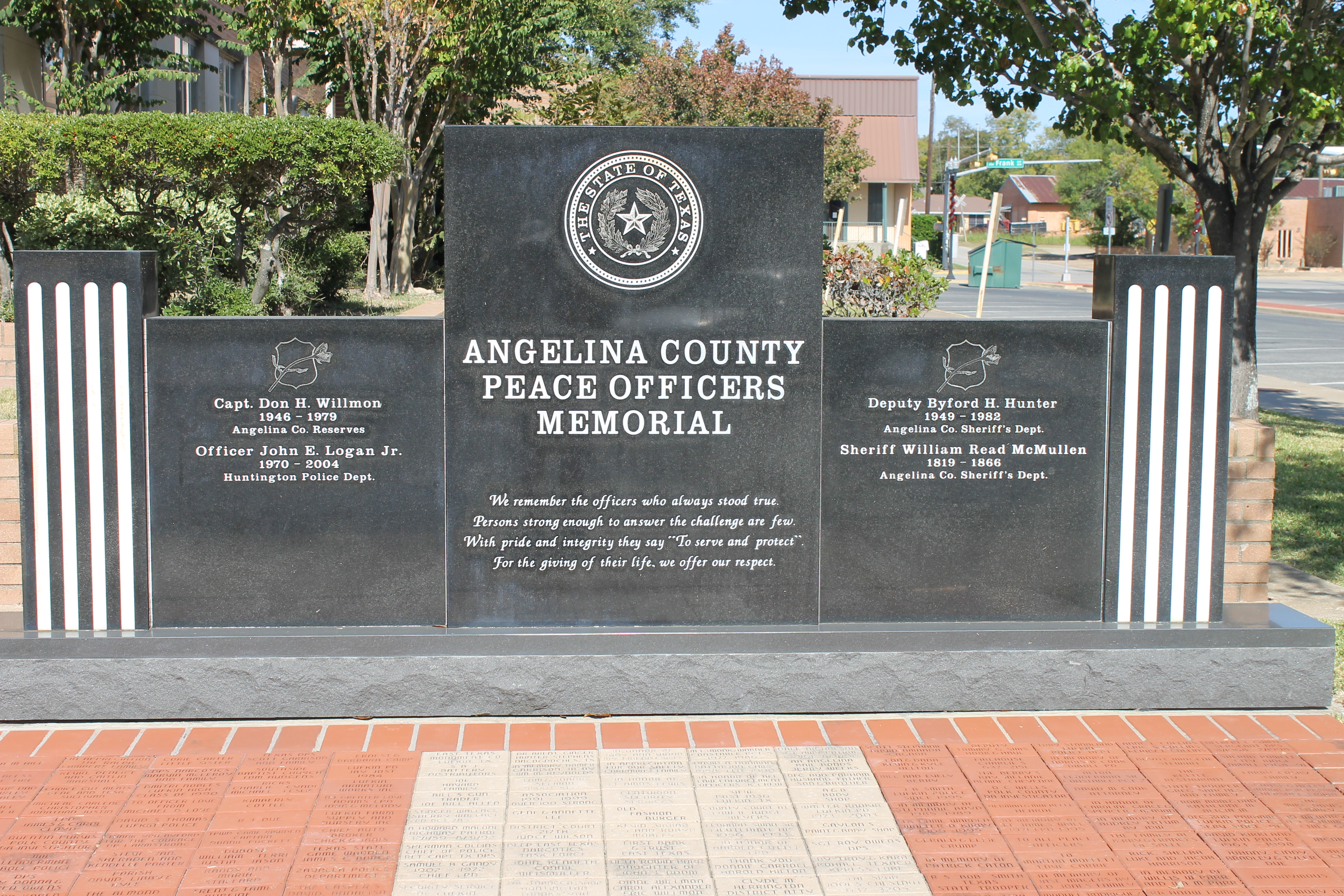
Angelina County Peace Officers Memorial at the courthouse

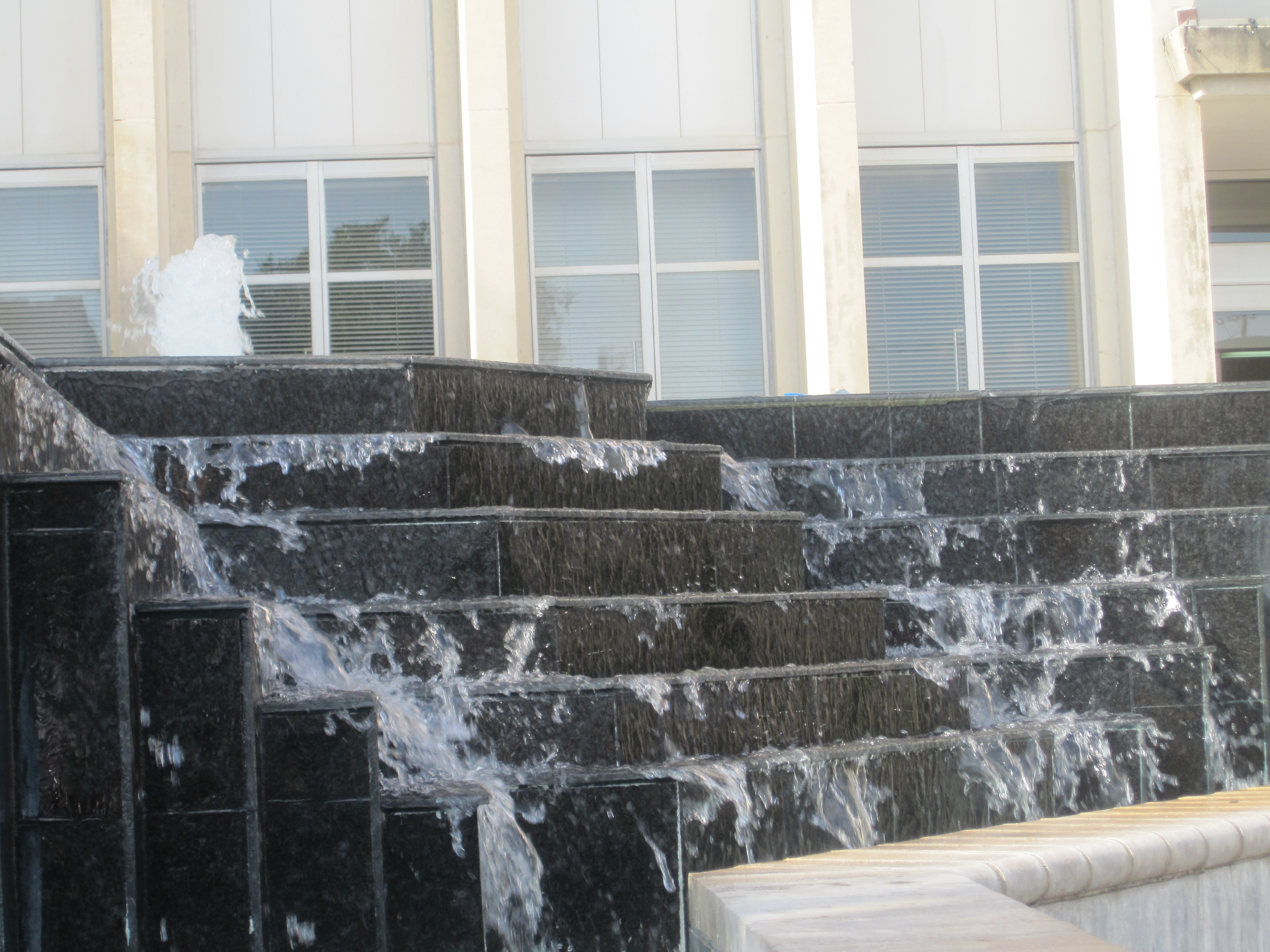
Fountain at Angelina County Courthouse

== See also ==
- National Register of Historic Places listings in Angelina County, Texas
- Recorded Texas Historic Landmarks in Angelina County
- List of counties in Texas
