= Central Independent School District =

School district in Texas, United States

Address
- 7622 US Highway 69 North ESC Region 7 Pollok, Texas; United States
- Coordinates: 31.4293°N 94.8144°W

District information
- Type: Public Independent school district
- Motto: Pride ... Passion ... Purpose
- Grades: EE through 12
- Superintendent: Isaac Brann
- Schools: 4
- NCES District ID: 4813500

Students and staff
- Students: 1,525 (2023–2024)
- Teachers: 114.95 (on an FTE basis) (2023–2024)
- Staff: 156.46 (on an FTE basis) (2023–2024)
- Student–teacher ratio: 13.27 (2023–2024)
- Athletic conference: UIL Class AAA (non-football participant)
- District mascot: Bulldog

Other information
- Website: www.centralisd.com

Central Independent School District is a public school district based in the community of Pollok, Texas (USA). In addition to Central, a small portion goes into the city of Lufkin.

In 2009, the school district was rated "academically acceptable" by the Texas Education Agency.

== History ==
Central Independent School District traces its origin to 1929 via the consolidation of five small schools that were located in the Pollok-Central area: Union, Durant, Pollok, Clawson and Allentown under the name Central Consolidated Common School District. By the 1939-1940 school year, the Cordaway Springs and Simpson schools had also merged with Central Consolidated. In 1955, Central converted from a Common School District to an Independent School District.

== Schools ==
Central ISD has three campuses - Central High (Grades 9-12), Central Junior High (Grades 5-8), and Central Elementary (Grades EE-4). Two campuses, along with the administration building, are located at one campus on U.S. Highway 69N approximately seven miles north of Lufkin, Texas. The third campus, a new elementary building, is located just 1/2 mile north on HWY 69.
