= Huntington, Texas =

- City
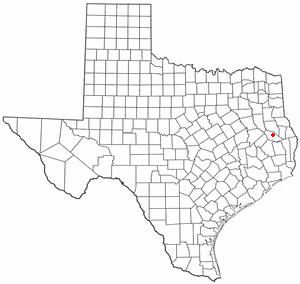
- Location of Huntington, Texas

- Coordinates: 31°16′49″N 94°34′38″W
- Country: United States
- State: Texas
- County: Angelina

Area
  - Total: 2.76 sq mi (7.14 km^{2})
  - Land: 2.75 sq mi (7.12 km^{2})
  - Water: 0.0077 sq mi (0.02 km^{2})
- Elevation: 322 ft (98 m)

Population (2020)
  - Total: 2,025
  - Density: 768.4/sq mi (296.69/km^{2})
- Time zone: UTC-6 (Central (CST))
  - Summer (DST): UTC-5 (CDT)
- ZIP code: 75949
- Area code: 936
- FIPS code: 48-35492
- GNIS feature ID: 2410809
- Website: www.cityofhuntington.org

Huntington is a city in Angelina County, Texas, United States. The population was 2,025 at the 2020 census. The site is named for Collis Potter Huntington, the chairman of the board of the Southern Pacific Railroad when the town was formed and one of the Big Four. Huntington is known as the "Gateway to Lake Sam Rayburn".

== Geography ==
Huntington is located in eastern Angelina County. U.S. Route 69 passes through the city, leading northwest 10 miles (16 km) to Lufkin, the county seat, and south 40 miles (64 km) to Woodville and 96 miles (154 km) to Beaumont.

According to the United States Census Bureau, Huntington has a total area of 2.7 square miles (7.1 km^{2}), of which 0.012 square miles (0.03 km^{2}), or 0.36%, is water.

== Demographics ==
Historical population
Census	Pop.	Note	%±
1940	969		—
1950	1,039		7.2%
1960	1,009		−2.9%
1970	1,192		18.1%
1980	1,672		40.3%
1990	1,794		7.3%
2000	2,068		15.3%
2010	2,118		2.4%
2020	2,025		−4.4%
U.S. Decennial Census

=== 2020 census ===
As of the 2020 census, Huntington had a population of 2,025. The median age was 36.5 years. 27.8% of residents were under the age of 18 and 17.8% of residents were 65 years of age or older. For every 100 females there were 87.8 males, and for every 100 females age 18 and over there were 82.2 males age 18 and over.

0.0% of residents lived in urban areas, while 100.0% lived in rural areas.

There were 736 households in Huntington, of which 36.8% had children under the age of 18 living in them. Of all households, 45.1% were married-couple households, 17.0% were households with a male householder and no spouse or partner present, and 32.3% were households with a female householder and no spouse or partner present. About 26.1% of all households were made up of individuals and 13.4% had someone living alone who was 65 years of age or older.

There were 840 housing units, of which 12.4% were vacant. The homeowner vacancy rate was 1.7% and the rental vacancy rate was 3.6%.

=== Racial and ethnic composition ===
Racial composition as of the 2020 census
Race	Number	Percent
White	1,714	84.6%
Black or African American	134	6.6%
American Indian and Alaska Native	12	0.6%
Asian	3	0.1%
Native Hawaiian and Other Pacific Islander	0	0.0%
Some other race	50	2.5%
Two or more races	112	5.5%
Hispanic or Latino (of any race)	136	6.7%

=== 2000 census ===
As of the 2000 census, there were 2,068 people, 757 households, and 560 families residing in the city. The population density was 758.0 inhabitants per square mile (292.7/km^{2}). There were 894 housing units at an average density of 327.7 units per square mile (126.5 units/km^{2}). The racial makeup of the city was 87.19% White, 8.56% African American, 0.58% Native American, 0.19% Asian, 1.35% from other races, and 2.13% from two or more races. Hispanic or Latino of any race were 3.72% of the population.

There were 757 households, out of which 41.2% had children under the age of 18 living with them, 52.8% were married couples living together, 17.3% had a female householder with no husband present, and 25.9% were non-families. 23.9% of all households were made up of individuals, and 12.5% had someone living alone who was 65 years of age or older. The average household size was 2.73 and the average family size was 3.25.

In the city, the population was spread out, with 32.0% under the age of 18, 9.9% from 18 to 24, 26.3% from 25 to 44, 19.6% from 45 to 64, and 12.2% who were 65 years of age or older. The median age was 32 years. For every 100 females, there were 91.0 males. For every 100 females age 18 and over, there were 82.8 males.

The median income for a household in the city was $56,862, and the median income for a family was $52,953. Males had a median income of $36,338 versus $29,554 for females. The per capita income for the city was $11,989. About 11.1% of families and 14.2% of the population were below the poverty line, including 14.5% of those under age 18 and 9.4% of those age 65 or over.

== Education ==
Huntington is served by the Huntington Independent School District

== Notable person ==
- Jack Tinsley, journalist

== Newspaper ==
Huntington's local newspaper is the Huntington Herald, serving Huntington, Zavalla, Etoile, and Homer.
