= Lufkin Independent School District =

School district in Texas, United States

Location
- Lufkin, Texas ESC Region 7 USA
- Coordinates: 31.3395°N 94.7298°W

District information
- Type: Public Independent school district
- Grades: ECE through 12
- Superintendent: James Hockenberry
- Schools: 17
- NCES District ID: 4828550

Students and staff
- Students: 7,046 (2023–2024)
- Teachers: 538.33 (on an FTE basis) (2023–2024)
- Staff: 703.74 (on an FTE basis) (2023–2024)
- Student–teacher ratio: 13.09 (2023–2024)

Other information
- Website: www.lufkinisd.org

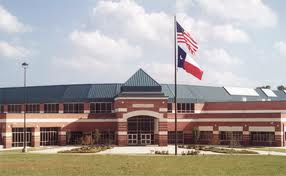
Lufkin High School

Lufkin Independent School District is a public school district based in Lufkin, Texas (USA). In addition to the city of Lufkin, Lufkin ISD serves a small portion of Burke.

In 2009, the school district was rated "academically acceptable" by the Texas Education Agency.

== Schools ==
In the 2017-2018 school year, the district had students in 15 schools. (A 75 million dollar bond was passed on May 5, 2018, to build a new middle school facility, and high school gym.)

High schools

- Lufkin High School (Grades 9-12)
- Pineywoods Community Academy (Grades 9-12)

Middle schools

- Lufkin Middle School (Grades 6-8)

Elementary schools

- Anderson Elementary School (Grades 3-5)
- Brandon Elementary School (Grades 3-5)
- Brookhollow Elementary School (Grades 3-5)
- Burley Elementary School (Grades KG-2)
- Coston Elementary School (Grades 3-5)
- Slack Elementary School (Grades 3-5)
- Dunbar Primary School (Grades KG-2)
- Garrett Primary School (Grades PK-KG)
- Hackney Primary School (Grades PK)
- Herty Primary School (Grades EE-2)
- Kurth Primary School (Grades PK-2)
- Trout Primary School (Grades EE-2)

Alternative schools

- ACE Alternative School

== School Board ==
There are 7 school board members. Texas state representative Trent Ashby is a former member and president of the board.
