= Huntington Independent School District =

School district in Texas, United States

Location
- Huntington, Texas ESC Region 7 USA
- Coordinates: 31.2843°N 94.5732°W

District information
- Type: 4A-2 Region II DISTRICT 8
- Motto: "It's a great day to be a Red Devil!"
- Grades: EE through 12
- Superintendent: Carolyn Fiaschetti
- Schools: 5
- NCES District ID: 4824000

Students and staff
- Students: 1,590 (2023–2024)
- Teachers: 127.38 (on an FTE basis) (2023–2024)
- Staff: 144.61 (on an FTE basis) (2023–2024)
- Student–teacher ratio: 12.48 (2023–2024)

Other information
- Website: www.huntingtonisd.com

Huntington Independent School District is a public school district based in Huntington, Texas (USA).

In 2009, the school district was rated "recognized" by the Texas Education Agency.

== Schools ==
In the 2012-2013 school year, the district had students in five schools.

High schools

- Huntington High School (Grades 9-12)

Middle schools

- Huntington Middle School (Grades 6-8)

Elementary schools

- Huntington Intermediate (Grades 4-5)
- Huntington Elementary (Grades EE-3)

Alternative schools

- Huntington PRIDE Alternative School (Grades 9-12)

== Athletics ==
Football

The Huntington Red Devil football team first kicked off in 1982 with Jack Churchill as the first coach of many for the team. They have never won district, had a winning season, and only 3 playoff appearances (the first one not coming until 2018).
