= Area code 936 =

Area code in Texas, United States

Numbering plan areas and area codes of Texas with numbering plan area 936 highlighted.

North American area code 936 is a state of Texas telephone area code for numbers in the Nacogdoches-Huntsville area, as well as a few outer portions of the Houston metropolitan area. It was created February 19, 2000, in a code-split from area code 409. It primarily serves the Deep East Texas area.

Counties served by this area code:

Angelina, Brazos, Cherokee, Grimes, Hardin, Harris, Houston, Leon, Liberty, Madison, Montgomery, Nacogdoches, Polk, San Augustine, San Jacinto, Shelby, Trinity, Tyler, Walker, Waller, and Washington

Towns and cities served by this area code:

Ace, Alto, Ames, Anderson, Apple Springs, Batson, Bedias, Broaddus, Camden, Center, Centralia, Chester, Chireno, Coldspring, Conroe, Corrigan, Crockett, Cushing, Cut and Shoot, Daisetta, Dallardsville, Dayton, Dayton Lakes, Devers, Diboll, Dobbin, Dodge, Douglass, Etoile, Flynn, Garrison, Goodrich, Grapeland, Groveton, Hardin, Hockley, Hull, Huntington, Huntsville, Iola, Joaquin, Kenefick, Kennard, Latexo, Leggett, Liberty, Livingston, Lovelady, Lufkin, Madisonville, Martinsville, Montgomery, Moscow, Nacogdoches, Navasota, New Waverly, Normangee, North Zulch, Oakhurst, Onalaska, Panorama Village, Pennington, Plantersville, Point Blank, Pollok, Prairie View, Ratcliff, Raywood, Reklaw, Richards, Riverside, Roans Prairie, Sacul, San Augustine, Saratoga, Seven Oaks, Shelbyville, Shepherd, Shiro, Tenaha, The Woodlands, Thicket, Timpson, Todd Mission, Trinity, Votaw, Waller, Washington, Wells, Willis, Woden, Woodlake, and Zavalla

== See also ==
- List of Texas area codes
- "Area Code Maps". North American Numbering Plan Administrator.
- List of exchanges from AreaCodeDownload.com, 936 Area Code

Texas area codes: 210/726, 214/469/972/945, 254, 325, 361, 409, 432, 512/737, 713/281/832/346, 806, 817/682, 830, 903/430, 915, 936, 940, 956, 979
	North: 430/903	
West: 979	area code 936	East: 318, 409
	South: 281/346/713/832	
Louisiana area codes: 225, 318/457, 337, 504, 985
