= National Register of Historic Places listings in Tyler County, Texas =

Location of Tyler County in Texas

This is a list of the National Register of Historic Places listings in Tyler County, Texas.

This is intended to be a complete list of properties listed on the National Register of Historic Places in Tyler County, Texas. There are three properties listed on the National Register in the county. One property is also a Recorded Texas Historic Landmark.

This National Park Service list is complete through NPS recent listings posted March 21, 2025.

== Current listings ==
The locations of National Register properties may be seen in a mapping service provided.

	Name on the Register	Image	Date listed	Location	City or town	Description
1	Tyler County Courthouse	Tyler County Courthouse	May 18, 2015 (#15000247)	100 West Bluff Street; 30°46′30″N 94°24′56″W	Woodville	Recorded Texas Historic Landmark
2	US 190 Bridge at the Neches River	US 190 Bridge at the Neches River	October 10, 1996 (#96001121)	US 190 at the Jasper and Tyler County line 30°51′12″N 94°11′55″W	Jasper	Historic Bridges of Texas, 1866-1945 MPS, extends into Jasper County
3	Warren School	Warren School	September 12, 2008 (#08000883)	312 County Road 1515; 30°36′46″N 94°24′27″W	Warren	

== See also ==
- National Register of Historic Places listings in Texas
- Recorded Texas Historic Landmarks in Tyler County
