= List of lakes of Conway County, Arkansas =

There are at least 38 named lakes and reservoirs in Conway County, Arkansas.

== Lakes ==
- Old River Lake, 33°59′16″N 092°36′02″W, el. 266 feet (81 m)
- Tank Lake, 35°08′40″N 092°34′16″W, el. 266 feet (81 m)

== Reservoirs ==
- Cargile Lake, 35°16′30″N 092°48′53″W, el. 328 feet (100 m)
- East Fork Point Remove Site Three Reservoir, 35°25′49″N 092°37′55″W, el. 489 feet (149 m)
- East Fork Point Remove Site Four Reservoir, 35°24′16″N 092°40′43″W, el. 472 feet (144 m)
- East Fork Point Remove Site Five Reservoir, 35°24′05″N 092°38′07″W, el. 466 feet (142 m)
- East Fork Point Remove Site Six Reservoir, 35°22′57″N 092°38′58″W, el. 430 feet (130 m)
- East Fork Point Remove Site Seven Reservoir, 35°21′54″N 092°39′45″W, el. 430 feet (130 m)
- East Fork Point Remove Site Eight Reservoir, 35°21′01″N 092°41′36″W, el. 430 feet (130 m)
- East Fork Point Remove Site Nine Reservoir, 35°17′31″N 092°41′11″W, el. 331 feet (101 m)
- East Fork Point Remove Site Ten Reservoir, 35°15′31″N 092°43′31″W, el. 305 feet (93 m)
- East Fork Point Remove Site 11 Reservoir, 35°16′55″N 092°45′39″W, el. 351 feet (107 m)
- Fish Lake, 35°13′23″N 092°47′54″W, el. 292 feet (89 m)
- Fowler Lake, 35°19′00″N 092°40′19″W, el. 420 feet (130 m)
- Lake Abby, 35°08′28″N 092°56′35″W, el. 1,053 feet (321 m)
- Lake Amanda, 35°08′46″N 092°55′21″W, el. 968 feet (295 m)
- Lake Bailey, 35°07′48″N 092°55′31″W, el. 889 feet (271 m)
- Lake Elsie, 35°08′13″N 092°56′49″W, el. 1,027 feet (313 m)
- Lake George, 35°08′38″N 092°55′27″W, el. 961 feet (293 m)
- Lake Jeannette, 35°08′05″N 092°55′48″W, el. 945 feet (288 m)
- Lake Lucy, 35°08′40″N 092°56′01″W, el. 1,014 feet (309 m)
- Lake Overcup, 35°12′11″N 092°43′14″W, el. 305 feet (93 m)
- Morrilton Sewage Lake, 35°10′48″N 092°44′31″W, el. 308 feet (94 m)
- Payne Lake, 35°06′13″N 092°46′54″W, el. 302 feet (92 m)
- Petit Jean State Park Lake, 35°07′30″N 092°55′15″W, el. 932 feet (284 m)
- Pool Nine, 35°07′30″N 092°47′13″W, el. 282 feet (86 m)
- Roosevelt Lake, 35°07′45″N 092°55′29″W, el. 892 feet (272 m)
- Timberlake Reservoir, 35°04′57″N 092°48′12″W, el. 295 feet (90 m)
- West Fork Point Remove Creek Site Four Reservoir, 35°27′17″N 092°41′54″W, el. 584 feet (178 m)
- West Fork Point Remove Creek Site Five Reservoir, 35°27′16″N 092°45′10″W, el. 610 feet (190 m)
- West Fork Point Remove Creek Site Six Reservoir, 35°25′06″N 092°47′07″W, el. 607 feet (185 m)
- West Fork Point Remove Creek Site Seven Reservoir, 35°25′45″N 092°50′56″W, el. 531 feet (162 m)
- West Fork Point Remove Creek Site 12 Reservoir, 35°21′02″N 092°48′42″W, el. 371 feet (113 m)
- West Fork Point Remove Creek Site 13 Reservoir, 35°21′02″N 092°45′47″W, el. 410 feet (120 m)
- West Fork Point Remove Creek Site 14 Reservoir, 35°20′43″N 092°45′26″W, el. 410 feet (120 m)
- West Fork Point Remove Creek Site 15 Reservoir, 35°19′55″N 092°46′37″W, el. 407 feet (124 m)
- West Fork Point Remove Creek Site 16 Reservoir, 35°18′20″N 092°51′09″W, el. 308 feet (94 m)
- Winrock Farms Lake, 35°38′24″N 092°55′43″W, el. 1,263 feet (385 m)

== See also ==
- List of lakes in Arkansas
