= Woodville High School (Texas) =

Public school in Texas, United States

Location
- 505 North Charlton Street; Woodville, Texas 75979-4000; United States; 30.785557°N 94.434040°W

Information
- School type: Public high school
- School district: Woodville Independent School District
- Principal: Lara Robinson
- Grades: 9-12
- Enrollment: 364 (2023-2024)
- Colors: Black and gold
- Athletics conference: UIL Class 3A
- Mascot: Eagle
- Yearbook: Echo
- Website: Woodville High School

Woodville High School is a public high school located in the city of Woodville, Texas in Tyler County, United States and classified as a 3A school by the UIL. It is a part of the Woodville Independent School District located in central Tyler County. In 2015, the school was rated "Met Standard" by the Texas Education Agency.

== Athletics ==
The Woodville Eagles compete in these sports -

- Baseball
- Basketball
- Cross Country
- Football
- Golf
- Powerlifting
- Softball
- Tennis
- Track and Field
- Volleyball

=== State Titles ===
Woodville (UIL)

- Baseball
  - 2005(2A)

Woodville Scott (PVIL)

- Boys Basketball
  - 1957(PVIL-1A), 1958(PVIL-1A)
- Girls Track
  - 1963(PVIL-2A), 1966(PVIL-2A)

== Notable people ==
- Hugh Pitts, former NFL player and alumni
- James E. White, former politician and former faculty member
