= Elvis Franks =

PAmerican football player (1957–2021)

No. 94, 74
- Position: Defensive end

Personal information
- Born: July 9, 1957; Doucette, Texas, U.S.
- Died: July 20, 2021 (aged 64); Lufkin, Texas, U.S.
- Listed height: 6 ft 4 in (1.93 m)
- Listed weight: 252 lb (114 kg)

Career information
- College: Morgan Sttate
- NFL draft: 1980: 5th round, 116th overall pick

Career history
- Cleveland Browns (1980–1984); Los Angeles Raiders (1985–1986); New York Jets (1986)

Career NFL statistics
- Sacks: 11.5
- Fumble recoveries: 3
- Stats at Pro Football Reference

Elvis Franks (July 9, 1957 – July 20, 2021) was an American professional football player who was a defensive end for seven years in the National Football League (NFL). He played college football for the Morgan State Bears.

== Background ==
Franks was born on July 9, 1957, in Doucette, Texas. He attended Kirby High School in Woodville, Texas, and college at Morgan State University in Baltimore, Maryland. He received a full athletic scholarship for track and field, but after being approached by a football coach, he began to play for the football team.

== Controversy ==
In 1986, while he was a member of the Los Angeles Raiders, Franks was arrested in Warrensville Heights, Ohio, on a charge of possession of cocaine with intent to distribute. According to the Federal Bureau of Investigation, Franks attempted to sell the drug to an undercover agent.

== Personal life ==
Franks died at home in Lufkin, Texas, on July 20, 2021. He was 64.
