= Elzie =

Elzie is a given name and surname. Notable people with the name include:

== Given name ==
- Elzie Buck Baker (1919–2002), American stock car racer
- Elzie Buddy Baker (1941–2015), American NASCAR driver and sports commentator, son of Buck Baker
- LZ Granderson (born 1972), American journalist and columnist
- Elzie Odom (1929–2025), American politician
- E. C. Segar (1894–1938), American cartoonist, creator of Popeye

== Surname ==
- Johnetta Elzie (born 1989), American civil rights activist
- Pat Elzie (born 1960), American-German professional basketball coach and former professional player

== See also ==
- Elsie (disambiguation)
