= Tyler County Courthouse =

Tyler County Courthouse may refer to:

- Tyler County Courthouse (Texas)
- Tyler County Courthouse and Jail, Middlebourne, West Virginia
