= James White (Texas politician) =

American politician, born 1964

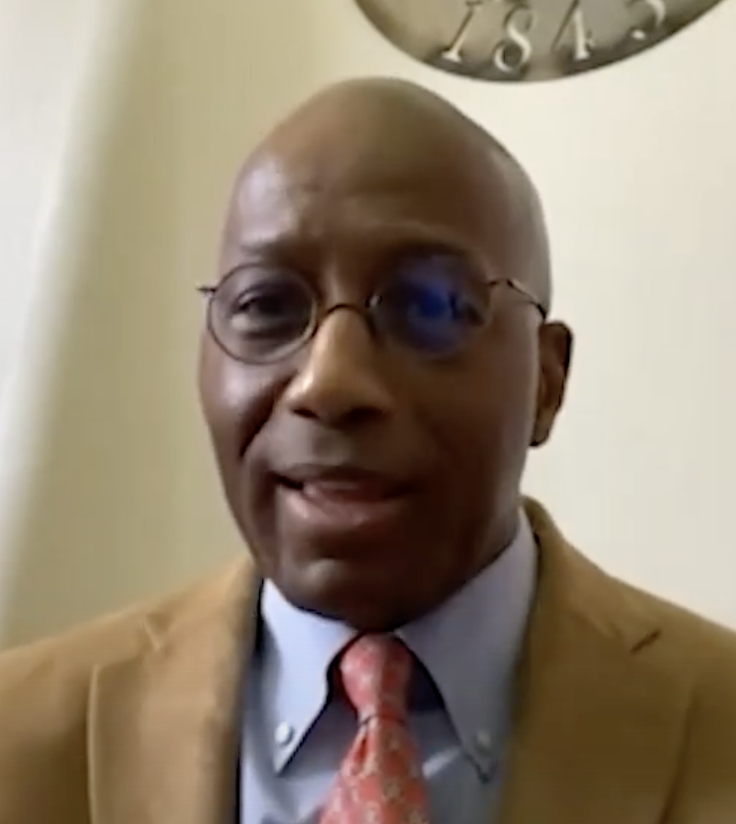
- White in 2021

Member of the Texas House of Representatives from the 19th district
- In office January 8, 2013 – August 11, 2022
- Preceded by: Tuffy Hamilton
- Succeeded by: Ellen Troxclair

Member of the Texas House of Representatives from the 12th district
- In office January 11, 2011 – January 8, 2013
- Preceded by: Jim McReynolds
- Succeeded by: Kyle Kacal

Personal details
- Born: James Earl White; July 16, 1964 (age 62) Houston, Texas, U.S.
- Party: Republican
- Education: Prairie View Agricultural and Mechanical University (BS, MEd); University of Houston (MS, PhD)
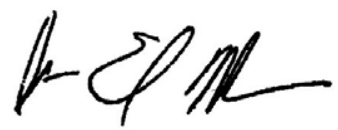
- Signature

Military service
- Allegiance: United States
- Branch/service: United States Army
- Years of service: 1986–1992
- Unit: Infantry Division

James Earl White (born July 16, 1964) is a former member of the Texas House of Representatives for District 19, which encompassed Polk, Hardin, Jasper, Newton, and Tyler counties. A member of the Republican Party, White was first elected in District 12 in 2010, which then included Angelina, San Jacinto, Trinity, and Tyler counties. He left office on August 11, 2022.

He resides in Hillister in Tyler County.

== Background ==
Born and reared in Houston, Texas, White attended public school and graduated in 1982 from Lamar High School. In 1986, White procured a Bachelor of Science degree in political science and military science from the historically black Prairie View Agricultural and Mechanical University in Prairie View, Texas. From 1986 until 1992, he served in the United States Army as a commissioned officer in the infantry. Thereafter, he taught in the public school system in the Houston area and was a guest columnist for Headway Magazine.

Later, White became a teacher at Woodville High School in Woodville, the county seat of Tyler County. He also owns a cattle ranch. He is a member of the Hillister Baptist Church.

In 2000, he obtained a Master of Education degree from Prairie View. In 2010 and 2012, respectively, he received a Master of Science and a Ph.D. from the University of Houston.

White is a member of the American Legion, the Masonic lodge, the National Rifle Association of America, the historically black fraternity Omega Psi Phi, the Farm Bureau, and Veterans of Foreign Wars. He is a board member of the Texas Federation of Republican Outreach.

== Political career ==
Running in House District 12 in 2010, White unseated the Democratic incumbent, Jim McReynolds, 20,958 (57.6 percent) to 15,405 (42.4 percent). Switched to District 19 in 2012, White unseated in the Republican primary the 10-year incumbent Mike "Tuffy" Hamilton of Lumberton in Hardin County. White polled 10,190 votes (54.5 percent) to Hamilton's 8,503 (45.5 percent). White then ran without Democratic opposition in the general election held on November 6, 2012.

In 2013, White voted against a bill to allow certain minors to consent to receiving immunizations (the bill passed the House 71–61). In August 2021, amid the COVID-19 pandemic in Texas, White spoke at an anti-vaccine mandate rally at the Texas State Capitol. The next month, White filed a bill to ban government entities from requiring private businesses to require vaccinations, and barring businesses which require employees to provide proof of vaccination from receiving state grants or contracts.

In 2017 and 2019, amid a national and statewide debate over the removal of Confederate monuments and memorials, White introduced bills that would restrict the removal of historical public monuments and memorials (including, but not limited to, Confederate monuments). White's 2017 bill called upon the Legislature, State Preservation Board, or Texas Historical Commission to find another "prominent location" whenever any monument on state property "for military, war-related or other historical service" was moved, and would have established fines and jail time for violators. White's 2019 bill would ban monuments erected more than 40 years ago from being "altered, moved, relocated, renamed or destroyed" and would ban the alteration, relocation, or destruction on monuments between 20–40 years unless a local referendum or a state Legislature vote to do so passed.

In the general election held on November 6, 2018, White overwhelmed his Democratic opponent, Sherry Williams, 49,926 (83.2 percent) to 10,070 (16.8 percent).

White was the sole African-American Republican in the Texas Legislature. Texas Monthly described him in 2019 as "rock-ribbed conservative in good standing with the right" who is also a leading advocate of criminal justice reform within the Texas Republican Party. White introduced legislation to update the Sandra Bland Act (a state law named after Sandra Bland, who died in a Texas jail shortly after being arrested at a traffic stop) by limiting arrests for minor misdemeanors; the measure did not pass.

In June 2021, White announced that he would not seek re-election to the Texas House in 2022, and announced that he was running for Agriculture Commissioner instead, challenging incumbent Republican Sid Miller in the Republican primary.

On October 19, 2021, White expressed his opinion about same-sex marriage in a letter to Texas Attorney General Ken Paxton. White noted that Texas laws "continue to define marriage as the union between one man and one woman" even after the U.S. Supreme Court decisions of Obergefell v. Hodges and De Leon v. Perry. He also expressed his opinion that, while federal court decisions prohibit "state officials" from enforcing these state laws, nothing prohibits "private citizens" from declining "to recognize homosexual marriages." In his letter, he requested that Paxton affirm this principle.

On August 11, 2022, White resigned from his seat in the Texas House to take the position as executive director of the Texas Funeral Services Commission.

Texas House of Representatives
Preceded by Tuffy Hamilton	Member of the Texas House of Representatives from the 19th district 2013–2022	Succeeded by Ellen Troxclair
Preceded by Jim McReynolds	Member of the Texas House of Representatives from the 12th district 2011–2013	Succeeded by Kyle Kacal
