= Lake Amanda =

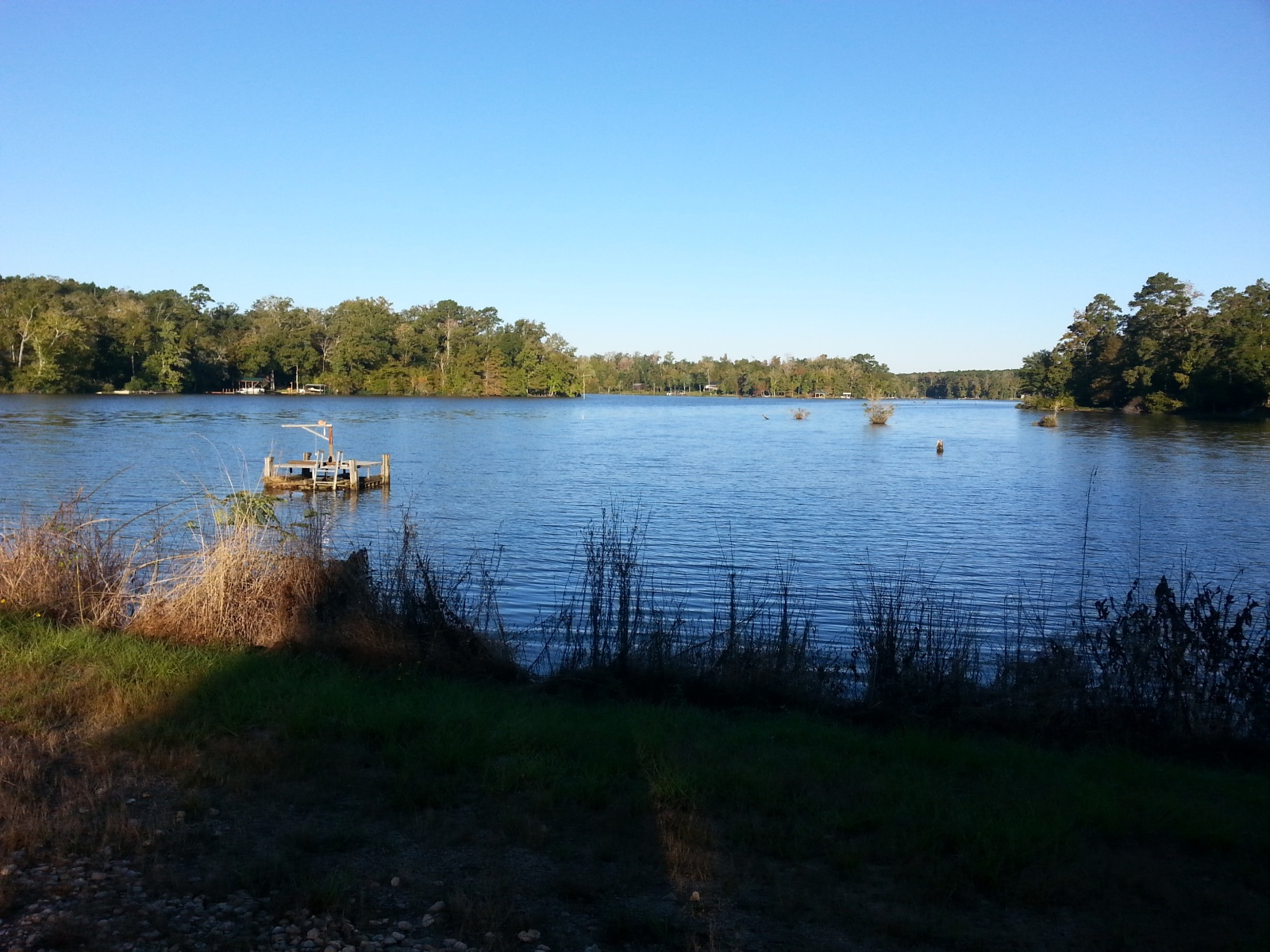
- Lake Amanda in 2013

- Location within Texas
- Location: Tyler County, Texas
- Coordinates: 30°53′35″N 94°24′18″W
- Type: artificial lake
- Basin countries: United States
- Surface area: 112 acres (45 ha)
- Surface elevation: 210 ft (64 m)

Lake Amanda is a private artificial lake in Tyler County, Texas, near the town of Colmesneil, that along with its sister Frog Pond, were developed in the 1950s and 1960s by James Haralson from his family's old homestead. The lake was named after Haralson's daughter. The lots surrounding the lake were originally designed as fish camps where families could come to camp, fish, and enjoy the outdoors. Today some people call the lake home full-time, others are there enjoying their retirement, and others just visit as a weekend get-away.

Lake Amanda has a surface area of approximately 112 acres (45 ha) and a normal water elevation of 210 feet (64 m).

The earthfill dam is located at coordinates 30.889°N 94.400°W, southeast of the town of Colmesneil. The spillway is constructed as a rectangular box culvert situated vertically near the dam, and it can be adjusted to raise or lower the level of the lake. It empties into Lively Branch, then into Wolf Creek, and ultimately into B.A. Steinhagen Reservoir.

On May 27, 2016, the Colmesneil area received a reported 14 inches of rainfall in one afternoon, raising the level of the lake several feet, until the water started spilling over the earthfill dam, which in turn caused massive erosion. Within a couple of hours, a catastrophic failure of the dam was the result, with a ±100 foot section of the dam washed downstream. The flooded lake emptied its contents downstream in less than two hours. The aforementioned Frog Pond lake has a horizontal concrete spillway a few feet lower than its earthen dam, the capacity of which prevented the water level there from spilling over the dam itself.

In response to the loss of the Lake Amanda dam during the Memorial Day flood in May 2016, The Lake Amanda Water Control and Improvement District No. 1 (“LAWCID or District”) was formed by the Tyler County Commissioners Court upon petition by the approximate 165 families that own property around Lake Amanda. The LAWCID's formation was ratified and its board of directors elected in the November 2016 general election and the District's voters approved a bond issue of $1 million to repair the dam. The District's property owners funded the engineering to repair and build a new spillway at the dam and such engineering designs were approved by the Texas Commission on Environmental Quality in June 2017. In August 2017, the District began discussions with the Texas Water Development Board (“TWDB”) about funding the dam repairs using loan proceeds from their D Fund account. In May 2018, the District voters overwhelmingly approved an increase in the bonds needed to rebuild the dam from $1 million to $1.5 million. A formal loan application was made to the TWDB by the LAWCID for this increased amount and on June 11, 2018, the TWDB board of directors approved a thirty-year loan to the District in the amount of $1.5 million. The LAWCID received the proceeds from this loan on August 3, 2018, and an official groundbreaking ceremony to start construction was held on the west side of the dam on Friday, August 10, 2018.

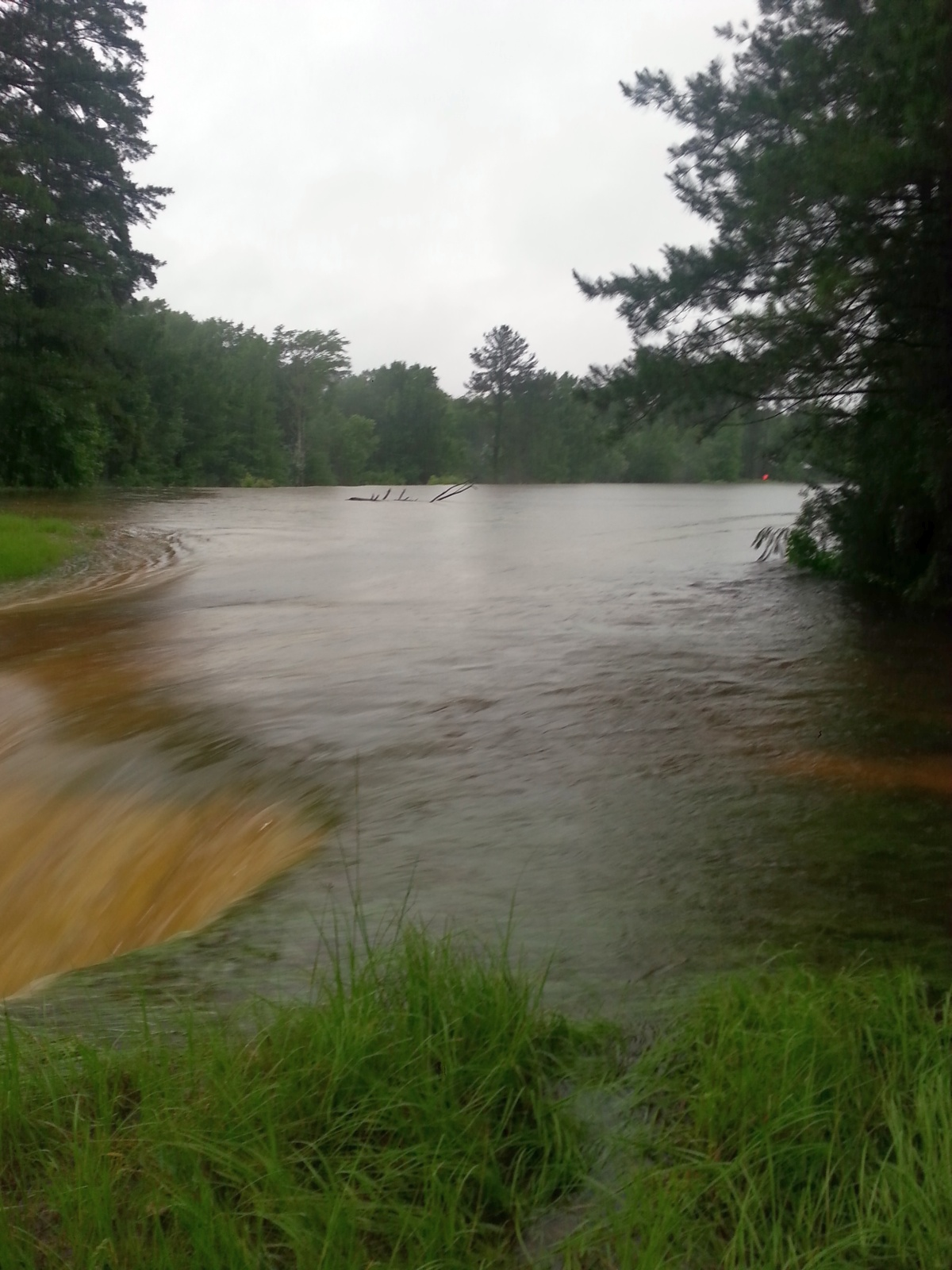
Water flowing over Lake Amanda Dam, May 27, 2016
