= Hugh Pitts =

American football player (1934–2017)

No. 56, 53
- Positions: Center, linebacker

Personal information
- Born: April 8, 1934; Woodville, Texas, U.S.
- Died: April 14, 2017 (aged 83); Brenham, Texas, U.S.
- Listed height: 6 ft 2 in (1.88 m)
- Listed weight: 223 lb (101 kg)

Career information
- High school: Woodville
- College: TCU (1952–1955)
- NFL draft: 1956: 2nd round, 23rd overall pick

Career history
- Los Angeles Rams (1956); Houston Oilers (1960)

Awards and highlights
- AFL champion (1960); First-team All-American (1955); Second-team All-American (1954); 2× First-team All-SWC (1954, 1955)

Career NFL/AFL statistics
- Interceptions: 3
- Fumble recoveries: 1
- Sacks: 1
- Stats at Pro Football Reference

Hugh Lynn Pitts (April 8, 1934 – April 14, 2017) was an American football linebacker in the National Football League (NFL) for the Los Angeles Rams. He also was a member of the Houston Oilers in the American Football League (AFL). He played college football at Texas Christian University.

== Early life ==
Pitts attended Woodville High School. He accepted a football scholarship from Texas Christian University.

As a junior, he became a starter at center, receiving Central Press Association second-team All-American honors. As a senior, he was named a team co-captain and received second-team Associated Press All-American honors.

In 1976, he was inducted into the TCU Lettermen's Association Hall of Fame.

== Professional career ==
Pitts was selected by the Los Angeles Rams in the second round (23rd overall) of the 1956 NFL draft. As a rookie, he appeared in nine games, while playing outside linebacker and intercepting three passes. In 1957, he notified the Rams that he was retiring from football.

On June 18, 1960, he signed as a free agent with the Houston Oilers of the American Football League, after he was convinced to come out of retirement. He started 12 games in the franchise's inaugural season and contributed to the team becoming the first American Football League champion. He was released before the start of the 1961 season.

On July 7, 1960, the Rams traded his NFL rights to the Dallas Cowboys in exchange for offensive guard Al Barry. Pitts never played for the Cowboys.

== Personal life ==
Pitts worked in real state and as a rancher. He received different awards, including San Luis Obispo's Agriculturalist of the Year (2016) and Paso Roblan of the month (March) and of the year (2017). On April 14, 2017, he died at the age of 83, from a heart attack he suffered while flying on a plane.
