= Acol, Texas =

Ghost town in Texas, US

Acol is a ghost town in Tyler County, Texas, United States. It was a logging operation of the Angelina County Lumber Company, and was named as for the company's acronym. The Southern Pacific Railroad ran through the settlement. It was operated from the 1930s until the 1940s, when its post office—a boxcar—was rolled to a new location.
