= Jasper Newsboy =

- Owner(s): Hearst Corporation
- Publisher: Jeff Bergin
- Editor: Kaitlin Bain
- Founded: 1865
- Headquarters: 292 S. Wheeler St Jasper, TX 75951
- Circulation: 570 (as of 2023)
- Website: https://www.beaumontenterprise.com/jasper/

The Jasper Newsboy is the newspaper of Jasper, Jasper County, Texas, United States.

A weekly newspaper, the Jasper Newsboy has been published continuously since July 1865, making it the oldest continuously published weekly newspaper in Texas.

The Jasper Newsboy is a part of the Beaumont Enterprise, a Hearst Corporation, also owners of the Houston Chronicle.

It is distributed in the Jasper trade area, which includes parts of Jasper, Newton, Sabine and Tyler counties.
