= KCOX =

Former simulcast of KTXJ-FM Jasper
- Jasper, Texas; United States
- Frequency: 1350 kHz
- Branding: Southern Gospel Radio

Programming
- Format: Southern gospel

Ownership
- Owner: CrossTexas Media, Inc.
- Sister stations: KTXJ-FM

History
- First air date: 1948
- Last air date: 2026
- Former call signs: KTXJ (1948–2003)

Technical information
- Licensing authority: FCC
- Facility ID: 35710
- Class: D
- Power: 5,000 watts day; 37 watts night
- Transmitter coordinates: 30°55′11″N 93°58′13″W

Links
- Public license information: Public file; LMS
- Webcast: Listen live
- Website: www.1027ktxj.com/1350-kcox.html

KCOX (1350 AM) was a radio station broadcasting a southern gospel format. Licensed to Jasper, Texas, United States, the station was owned by CrossTexas Media. KCOX was a member of The Texas Association of Broadcasters.

CrossTexas Media closed KCOX in August 2026 and returned the license to the Federal Communications Commission. It was cancelled on August 27.
