= National Register of Historic Places listings in Jasper County, Texas =

Location of Jasper County in Texas

This is a list of the National Register of Historic Places listings in Jasper County, Texas.

This is intended to be a complete list of properties listed on the National Register of Historic Places in Jasper County, Texas. There are seven properties listed on the National Register in the county. Two properties are State Antiquities Landmarks one of which along with three others are Recorded Texas Historic Landmarks.

This National Park Service list is complete through NPS recent listings posted March 21, 2025.

== Current listings ==
The locations of National Register properties may be seen in a mapping service provided.

	Name on the Register	Image	Date listed	Location	City or town	Description
1	Aldridge Sawmill	Aldridge Sawmill	March 2, 2001 (#01000209)	Angelina National Forest., S end of Forest System Rd. 31°02′19″N 94°16′49″W	Zavalla	Early Logging Industry in East Texas MPS
2	Blake-Beaty-Orton House	Blake-Beaty-Orton House	April 16, 1975 (#75001994)	206 S. Main St. 30°55′08″N 93°59′58″W	Jasper	State Antiquities Landmark, Recorded Texas Historic Landmark
3	Col. Randolph C. Doom House		December 30, 1975 (#75001995)	7.5 mi (12.1 km). W of Jasper on FM 1747; 30°55′25″N 94°07′27″W	Jasper	Recorded Texas Historic Landmark
4	Jasper County Courthouse	Jasper County Courthouse	September 6, 1984 (#84001898)	Public Sq. 30°55′16″N 94°00′00″W	Jasper	State Antiquities Landmark
5	Andrew Smyth House	Andrew Smyth House	May 25, 1979 (#79002983)	W of Jasper; 30°56′07″N 94°08′39″W	Jasper	Recorded Texas Historic Landmark
6	Turner-White-McGee House		June 19, 1979 (#79002984)	Off U.S. 96; 30°48′17″N 93°54′51″W	Roganville	Recorded Texas Historic Landmark
7	US 190 Bridge at the Neches River	US 190 Bridge at the Neches River	October 10, 1996 (#96001121)	US 190 at the Jasper and Tyler County line 30°51′09″N 94°10′52″W	Jasper	Historic Bridges of Texas, 1866-1945 MPS, extends into Tyler County

== See also ==
- National Register of Historic Places listings in Texas
- Recorded Texas Historic Landmarks in Jasper County
