= Ivanhoe, Texas =

Ivanhoe, Texas may refer to the following places:

- Ivanhoe, Fannin County, Texas, an unincorporated community
- Ivanhoe, Tyler County, Texas, a city incorporated in November 2009
- Ivanhoe North, a city incorporated in November 2009 that was then merged with the City of Ivanhoe through a November 2010 vote.
