= US 190 Bridge at the Neches River =

- U.S. National Register of Historic Places
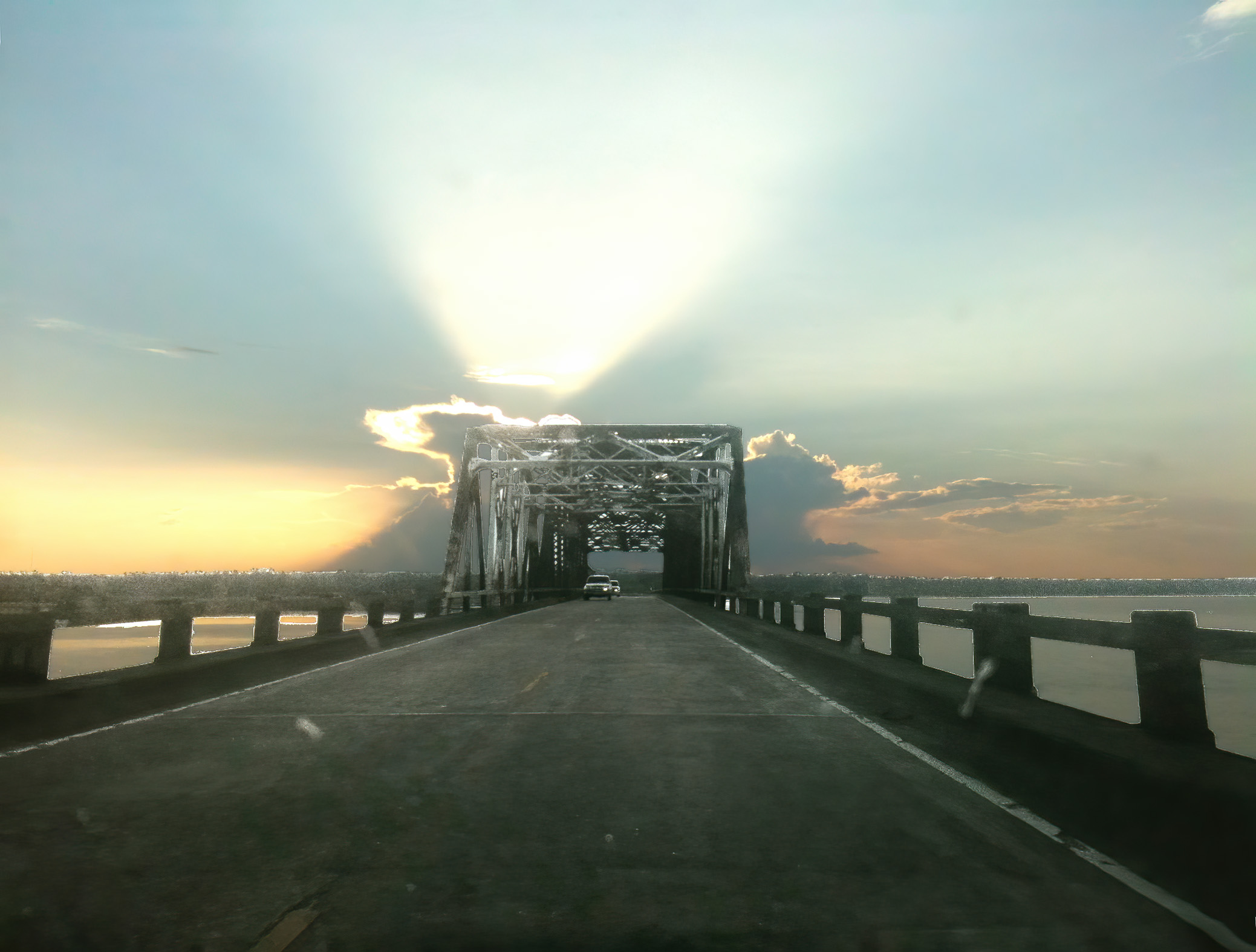
- US 190 Bridge in 2010
- Nearest city: Jasper, Texas
- Coordinates: 30°51′12″N 94°11′55″W
- Area: less than one acre
- Built: 1941
- Built by: Gaylord Construction Company
- Architect: Texas Highway Department
- Fabricator: Virginia Bridge Company
- Architectural style: Parker through truss bridge
- MPS: Historic Bridges of Texas, 1866-1945 MPS
- NRHP reference No.: 96001121
- Added to NRHP: October 10, 1996

The US 190 Bridge at the Neches River, near Jasper, Texas, was built in 1941. It carries U.S. Route 190 across the Neches River, connecting Jasper County, Texas and Tyler County, Texas. The bridge was listed on the National Register of Historic Places in 1996.

It is a Parker through truss bridge designed by the Texas Highway Department. It was fabricated by the Virginia Bridge Company of Roanoke, Virginia and constructed by the Gaylord Construction Company of Houston.

== See also ==
- National Register of Historic Places listings in Jasper County, Texas
