= Allan Shivers Library and Museum =

- Location within Texas
- Established: 1966
- Location: 302 N. Charlton; Woodville, Texas
- Coordinates: 30.777219°N 94.416201°W
- Type: Shivers historical records Public library
- Website: Allan Shivers Library and Museum

The Allan Shivers Library and Museum is located at 302 N. Charlton, in the city of Woodville, in the county of Tyler, in the U.S. state of Texas. The structure is a Recorded Texas Historic Landmark. The museum serves as a repository of historical records and memorabilia of the 37th Governor of Texas. It also houses Woodville's public library.

== History ==
Allan Shivers was the 37th Governor of Texas, serving in that position 1948–1957. Prior to that, he was Lieutenant Governor of Texas and also served 12 years in the Texas State Senate. Although he was born in Lufkin, the Shivers family owned a home near Woodville. He lived in Woodville until his high school years when the Shivers family moved to Port Arthur. Governor Shivers was married to Marialice Shary (Shivers) from Mission. The couple had four children.

The two-story Victorian style library and museum dates back to 1881 and its original resident by the name of Robert A. Cruse. Governor and Mrs. Shivers purchased the home in 1963, moving it to its current location. Interior designer Melanie Kahane, who had designed the interiors for a number of theatres in New York City, was hired to help convert the residence into a museum to house historical records and memorabilia of the couple's personal and public lives. A part of the house was reserved for a local library.

== Museum ==
The entire second story is devoted to the Shivers gubernatorial years. Featured first-floor rooms include a Victorian parlor furnished with antiques and family artifacts. The interior carpet was imported from France. The trophy room houses Governor Shiver's Zambia safari souvenirs. The Governor's private book collection in the Rare Books Room may be used only within the library and requires staff authorization. Conference facilities are available by advance reservation.

== Admission, hours ==
Admission fee. Tours available. Groups over 10 people must book in advance.

Open 6 days a week.

Hours: Monday-Friday 9 a.m. – 5 p.m.; Saturday 10 a.m. – 2 p.m.

== See also ==
- List of museums in East Texas
