= Colmesneil Independent School District =

School district in Texas, US

Address
- 610 West Elder Street Colmesneil, Tyler County, Texas, 75938; United States
- Coordinates: 30.908030°N 94.429340°W

District information
- NCES District ID: 4814600
- District ID: TX-229901

Students and staff
- Students: 401 (2023–2024)
- Teachers: 37.78 (on an FTE basis) (2023–2024)
- Staff: 26.76 (on an FTE basis) (2023–2024)
- Student–teacher ratio: 10.61 (2023–2024)

Other information
- Website: www.colmesneilisd.net

Colmesneil Independent School District is a public school district based in Colmesneil, Texas (US). Located in Tyler County, the district extends into a small portion of southern and western Jasper County. Colmesneil ISD also owns and operates Lake Tejas, which is open in the summer from Memorial Day to Labor Day.

== Schools ==
Colmesneil ISD has two campuses:

- Colmesneil Junior High & High School (Grades 7-12),
- Colmesneil Elementary School (Grades PK-6)

The Colmesneil Independent School District (CISD) received a letter grade of "B".

2020-2021 Colmesneil ISD District and Campus State and Accountability Ratings: Colmesneil ISD - Letter Grade of "B". Colmesneil JH/HS - Letter Grade of "B". Colmesneil Elementary - Letter Grade of "Not Rated".

In 2009, the school district was rated "recognized" by the Texas Education Agency.
