= ELSI (disambiguation) =

ELSI stands for "Ethical, Legal and Social Issues", associated with the Human genome project.

ELSI may also refer to:

- Ethical, Legal and Social Aspects research
- Earth-Life Science Institute at Tokyo Institute of Technology

== See also ==
- Elsie (disambiguation)
