= Hillister, Texas =

Hillister
- unincorporated community
- Location within the state of Texas Hillister (the United States)
- Coordinates: 30°40′4″N 94°22′53″W
- Country: United States
- State: Texas
- County: Tyler
- Elevation: 190 ft (58 m)
- Time zone: UTC-6 (Central (CST))
  - Summer (DST): UTC-5 (CDT)
- ZIP codes: 77624
- GNIS feature ID: 1359276

Hillister is an unincorporated community in southern Tyler County, Texas, United States. It lies along the concurrent U.S. Routes 69 and 287, south of the town of Woodville, the county seat of Tyler County. Although Hillister is unincorporated, it has a post office, with the ZIP code of 77624.

== Notable person ==
Hillister is the residence of State Representative James E. White of District 19, which encompasses Polk, Hardin, Jasper, Newton and Tyler counties.
