= Texas's 12th House of Representatives district =

Texas's 12th State House of Representatives district
Representative
Trey Wharton; R–College Station
- Demographics: 55.1% White; 18.9% Black; 22.7% Hispanic; 1.5% Asian; 1.8% Other
- Population (2020) • Voting age: 202,487; 162,321

District 12 is a district in the Texas House of Representatives. It was created in the 3rd legislature (1849–1851).

The district has been represented by Republican Trey Wharton since January 14, 2025, upon his initial election to the Texas House.

As a result of redistricting after the 2020 Federal census, from the 2022 elections the district encompasses all of Grimes, Madison, Robertson, Walker, and Washington Counties, and the eastern portion of Brazos County. Major cities in the district include Brenham, Center, Huntsville, Madisonville, and Navasota, along with small parts of Bryan and College Station. Sam Houston State University is in the district, along with Washington-on-the-Brazos Historical Site (where Texas declared its independence from Mexico) and the headquarters of the Texas Department of Criminal Justice and several prisons including the Huntsville Unit, home of the state's execution chamber.

== Members ==
- Kyle Kacal
- Trey Wharton
