= Spurger, Texas =

Spurger
- Unincorporated community
- Spurger
- Location within the state of Texas Spurger (the United States)
- Coordinates: 30°41′34″N 94°10′40″W
- Country: United States
- State: Texas
- County: Tyler
- Elevation: 164 ft (50 m)
- Time zone: UTC-6 (Central (CST))
  - Summer (DST): UTC-5 (CDT)
- ZIP code: 77660
- Area code: 409
- GNIS feature ID: 1369052

Spurger (/ˈspɜːrɡər/ SPUR-gər) is an unincorporated community in southeastern Tyler County, Texas, United States.

The Spurger Independent School District serves area students.

== Historical development ==
The first area settlers are known to be in the region as early as 1834. The town's name Spurger comes from a family of landowners who resided there initially. From 1859 a school was established there, and by 1881 a post office was opened.

The Neches River flows through the community.

== Climate ==
The climate in this area is characterized by hot, humid summers and generally mild to cool winters. According to the Köppen Climate Classification system, Spurger has a humid subtropical climate, abbreviated "Cfa" on climate maps.

== Awards and recognition ==
Starting on September 1, 2017, for a 10-year period, this area is known as the Knife Capitol of Texas.
