= Trey Wharton =

American politician

Member of the Texas House of Representatives from the 12th district
- Incumbent
- Assumed office January 14, 2025
- Preceded by: Kyle Kacal

Personal details
- Born: December 17, 1966 (age 59)
- Party: Republican
- Spouse: Jolynne
- Education: Texas Christian University
- Occupation: Businessman
- Website: Campaign website

Trey Wharton (born December 17, 1966) is an American politician who was elected member of the Texas House of Representatives for the 12th district in 2024. A member of the Republican Party, he succeeded Kyle Kacal. Wharton attended Huntsville High School and Texas Christian University. He is a businessman, community leader and school board trustee in Huntsville, Texas.

Texas House of Representatives
| Preceded by Kyle Kacal | Member of the Texas House of Representatives from the 12th district 2025–present | Incumbent |
