= Al Barry =

American football player (born 1930)

No. 63, 66, 68, 69
- Position: Guard

Personal information
- Born: December 24, 1930; Beverly Hills, California, U.S.
- Died: August 5, 2022 (aged 91)
- Listed height: 6 ft 2 in (1.88 m)
- Listed weight: 238 lb (108 kg)

Career information
- High school: Beverly Hills
- College: USC
- NFL draft: 1953: 30th round, 355th overall pick

Career history
- Green Bay Packers (1954, 1957); New York Giants (1958–1959); Los Angeles Rams (1960)*; Los Angeles Chargers (1960)
- * Offseason or practice squad member only

Career NFL/AFL statistics
- Games played: 53
- Games started: 45
- Fumble recoveries: 1
- Stats at Pro Football Reference

Allan Barry (December 24, 1930 – August 5, 2022) was an American professional football player who was an offensive guard in the National Football League (NFL) for the Green Bay Packers and New York Giants. He also was a member of the Los Angeles Chargers in the American Football League (AFL). He played college football for the USC Trojans.

== Early life ==
Barry attended Beverly Hills High School, before accepting a football scholarship from the University of Southern California.

He was a two-way player, on offense, he was a tackle until his senior season when he was moved to guard. He contributed to the team winning the 1953 Rose Bowl. He also practiced the shot put.

== Professional career ==
=== Green Bay Packers ===
Barry was selected by the Green Bay Packers in the 30th round (355th overall) of the 1953 NFL draft with a future draft pick, which allowed the team to draft him before his college eligibility was over. He began his rookie season one year later and was named the starter at left guard.

He spent the next two years out of football while serving his military service with the U.S. Air Force. He returned in 1957 and regained his starting position.

On September 15, 1958, he was traded along with offensive guard Joe Skibinski to the New York Giants in exchange for a seventh round draft choice (#83-Gary Raid).

=== New York Giants ===
Barry was a two-year starter at left guard with the New York Giants, contributing to the team reaching the 1958 and the 1959 NFL Championship Game.

=== Dallas Cowboys ===
He was selected by the Dallas Cowboys in the 1960 NFL expansion draft. He didn't want to move to Dallas, so he was traded to the Los Angeles Rams in exchange for linebacker Hugh Pitts.

=== Los Angeles Rams ===
Although he started most of the preseason at left guard, the Los Angeles Rams decided to move forward with younger players and he was released on September 19, 1960.

=== Los Angeles Chargers ===
In 1960, he was signed as a free agent by the Los Angeles Chargers of the American Football League. He was a part of the franchise's inaugural year and was named the starting offensive guard, while helping the team reach the 1960 American Football League Championship Game. He retired at the end of the season.
