= Colmesneil, Texas =

- City
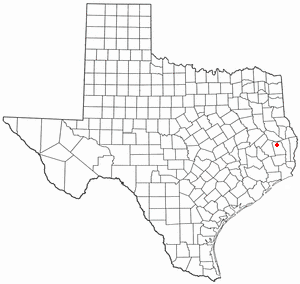
- Location of Colmesneil, Texas

- Coordinates: 30°54′35″N 94°25′19″W
- Country: United States
- State: Texas
- County: Tyler

Area
  - Total: 2.00 sq mi (5.18 km^{2})
  - Land: 2.00 sq mi (5.18 km^{2})
  - Water: 0 sq mi (0.00 km^{2})
- Elevation: 276 ft (84 m)

Population (2020)
  - Total: 542
  - Density: 295.4/sq mi (114.06/km^{2})
- Time zone: UTC-6 (Central (CST))
  - Summer (DST): UTC-5 (CDT)
- ZIP code: 75938
- Area code: 409
- FIPS code: 48-16048
- GNIS feature ID: 2410196
- Website: www.cityofcolmesneil.com

Colmesneil (/ˈkoʊlmɪsniːl/ KOHL-mis-neel) is a town in Tyler County, Texas, United States. It is located nine miles north of Woodville on U.S. Highway 69. The population was 542 at the 2020 census.

== Historical development ==
The town's name came from one of the first conductors, W. T. Colmesneil, on the Texas and New Orleans Railroad, which ran through the county. The Trinity and Sabine Railroad extended a 66-mile line from Colmesneil to Trinity, establishing the town as the shipping focal point for the county from 1881. Timber and cattle were the foremost commodities to sell due to the steep slope of the terrain. From the 1880s, the Yellow Pine Lumber Company operated a mill there, and for a while, Colmesneil's population was greater than that of Beaumont.

The surname Colmesneil is probably a misspelling for Colmesnil, a Norman surname originally designating "someone from Colmesnil", a village in the traditional pays de Caux district, in département Seine-Maritime, Normandy, France. It means "Koli′s rural estate", Koli being the name of a Scandinavian settler (see Colleville).

== Geography ==
According to the United States Census Bureau, the town has a total area of 2.0 square miles (5.2 km^{2}), all land.

=== Climate ===
The climate in this area is characterized by hot, humid summers and generally mild to cool winters. According to the Köppen climate classification, Colmesneil has a humid subtropical climate, Cfa on climate maps.

== Demographics ==
Historical population
Census	Pop.	Note	%±
1980	553		—
1990	569		2.9%
2000	638		12.1%
2010	596		−6.6%
2020	542		−9.1%
U.S. Decennial Census

=== Racial and ethnic composition ===
Racial composition as of the 2020 census
Race	Number	Percent
White	447	82.5%
Black or African American	40	7.4%
American Indian and Alaska Native	4	0.7%
Asian	0	0%
Native Hawaiian and Other Pacific Islander	0	0%
Some other race	19	3.5%
Two or more races	32	5.9%
Hispanic or Latino (of any race)	37	6.8%

=== 2020 census ===
As of the 2020 census, Colmesneil had a population of 542 and a median age of 45.8 years.

23.4% of residents were under the age of 18 and 19.6% were 65 years of age or older.

For every 100 females there were 98.5 males, and for every 100 females age 18 and over there were 88.6 males age 18 and over.

0% of residents lived in urban areas, while 100.0% lived in rural areas.

There were 211 households in Colmesneil, of which 30.3% had children under the age of 18 living in them. Of all households, 54.0% were married-couple households, 16.6% were households with a male householder and no spouse or partner present, and 28.4% were households with a female householder and no spouse or partner present. About 27.9% of all households were made up of individuals and 17.0% had someone living alone who was 65 years of age or older.

There were 256 housing units, of which 17.6% were vacant. Among occupied housing units, 83.9% were owner-occupied and 16.1% were renter-occupied. The homeowner vacancy rate was 3.7% and the rental vacancy rate was 12.8%.

== Education ==
The City of Colmesneil is served by the Colmesneil Independent School District.
