= Elsie =

Elsie may refer to:

== People and fictional characters ==
- Elsie (given name), a list of people and fictional characters
- Lily Elsie (1886–1952), English actress and singer born Elsie Hodder
- Robert Elsie (1950–2017), Canadian expert in Albanian culture and affairs
- Hahm Eun-jung (born 1988), South Korean singer and actress known professional as Elsie, a member of T-ara

== Places ==
=== United States ===
- Elsie, Kentucky, an unincorporated community
- Elsie, Michigan, a village
- Elsie, Nebraska, village
- Lake Elsie, in North Dakota

=== Canada ===
- Elsie Island, Nunavut
- Elsie Lake, in British Columbia

== Music ==
- Elsie (album), the 2011 début album by The Horrible Crowes
- Elsie (musical)
  - "Elsie", a song from Elsie (musical)

== Other uses ==
- USS Elsie III (SP-708), a United States Navy patrol vessel in commission from 1917 to 1919, later USC&G Elsie III, a United States Coast and Geodetic Survey ship from 1919 to 1944
- Elsie (robot), an autonomous robot built by William Grey Walter
- Elsie mine, also known as the C3A1 mine, a type of anti-personnel mine
- Elsie, nickname for Searchlight Control radar (SLC radar)
- Elsie Refuge, the first women's shelter to protect women from domestic violence in Australia

== See also ==
- Elsie-Dee, a Marvel Comics ally of Wolverine
- ELSI (disambiguation)
