= Woodville Independent School District =

School district in Texas

Address
- 505 North Charlton Street Woodville, Texas, 75979; United States

District information
- Type: Public
- Grades: PK–12
- Schools: 4
- NCES District ID: 4846440

Students and staff
- Students: 1,215 (2023–2024)
- Teachers: 107.73 (on an FTE basis) (2023–2024)
- Staff: 141.07 (on an FTE basis) (2023–2024)
- Student–teacher ratio: 11.28 (2023–2024)

Other information
- Website: www.woodvilleeagles.org

Woodville Independent School District is a public school district based in Woodville, Texas (USA).

Located primarily in Tyler County, the district extends into a small portion of Polk County. It includes a part of Ivanhoe.

In 2009, the school district was rated "academically acceptable" by the Texas Education Agency.

== Schools ==
- Woodville High School (Grades 9-12)
- Woodville Middle (Grades 6-8)
- Woodville Intermediate (Grades 3-5)
- Wheat Elementary (Grades PK-2)
