= Kyle Kacal =

American politician (born 1969)

Member of the Texas House of Representatives from the 12th district
- In office January 8, 2013 – January 14, 2025
- Preceded by: James White
- Succeeded by: Trey Wharton

Personal details
- Born: Kyle Jerome Kacal; December 26, 1969 (age 56) College Station, Texas, U.S.
- Party: Republican
- Spouse: Marci Kacal
- Children: 2
- Education: Texas A&M University (BA); Texas Christian University
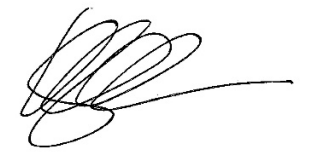
- Signature

Kyle Jerome Kacal (born December 26, 1969) is an American politician. He served as a Republican member for the 12th district of the Texas House of Representatives.

Kacal was born in College Station, Texas. He attended Texas A&M University, where he earned a Bachelor of Arts in political science in 1992. He then attended Texas Christian University, where he received a certificate in ranch management in 1993.

In 2012, Kacal was elected for the 12th district of the Texas House of Representatives. He assumed office on January 8, 2013. In 2022, Kacal was nominated as candidate for the 12th district.

Texas House of Representatives
Preceded by James White	Member of the Texas House of Representatives from the 12th district 2013–2025	Succeeded by Trey Wharton
