= Chester Independent School District =

School district in Texas, United States

Address
- 273 Yellowjacket Drive ESC Region 5 Chester, Texas; United States
- Coordinates: 30.9279°N 94.5948°W

District information
- Type: Public
- Grades: Pre-K through 12
- Superintendent: Cory Hines
- NCES District ID: 4813770

Students and staff
- Students: 187 (2023–2024)
- Teachers: 21.02 (on an FTE basis) (2023–2024)
- Staff: 19.69 (on an FTE basis) (2023–2024)
- Student–teacher ratio: 8.90 (2023–2024)
- Athletic conference: UIL Class A
- District mascot: Yellowjacket
- Colors: Purple and Gold

Other information
- Website: www.chesterisd.com

Chester Independent School District is a public school district based in Chester, Texas (USA).

Located in Tyler County, a portion of the district extends into Polk County.

Chester ISD has two school buildings, located on the same campus – Chester High (Grades 6-12) and Chester Elementary (Grades PK-5).

== Academic achievement ==
In 2009, the school district was rated "recognized" by the Texas Education Agency.

== Special programs ==
=== Athletics ===
Chester High School plays six-man football. It played 11-man football until 2010 (and with an enrollment of 68 students was the smallest 11-man program in the state).

== See also ==
- List of school districts in Texas
