= Doucette, Texas =

Doucette
- Unincorporated community
- Location within the state of Texas Doucette (the United States)
- Coordinates: 30°49′6″N 94°25′44″W
- Country: United States
- State: Texas
- County: Tyler
- Elevation: 331 ft (101 m)
- Time zone: UTC-6 (Central (CST))
  - Summer (DST): UTC-5 (CDT)
- ZIP codes: 75942
- GNIS feature ID: 1356206

Doucette is an unincorporated community in central Tyler County, Texas, United States. It lies along U.S. Route 69, north of the town of Woodville, the county seat of Tyler County. Although Doucette is unincorporated, it has a post office, with the ZIP code of 75942.
