= Chester, Texas =

- Town
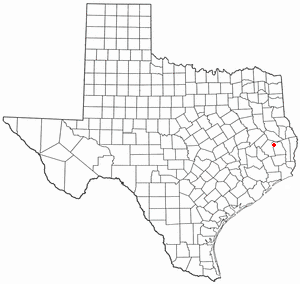
- Location of Chester, Texas

- Coordinates: 30°55′24″N 94°36′47″W
- Country: United States
- State: Texas
- County: Tyler

Area
  - Total: 1.58 sq mi (4.08 km^{2})
  - Land: 1.58 sq mi (4.08 km^{2})
  - Water: 0 sq mi (0.00 km^{2})
- Elevation: 253 ft (77 m)

Population (2020)
  - Total: 270
  - Density: 170/sq mi (66/km^{2})
- Time zone: UTC-6 (Central (CST))
  - Summer (DST): UTC-5 (CDT)
- ZIP code: 75936
- Area code: 936
- FIPS code: 48-14584
- GNIS feature ID: 2413194

Chester is a town in Tyler County, Texas, United States. The population was 270 at the 2020 census.

== Geography ==
According to the United States Census Bureau, the town has a total area of 1.6 square miles (4.1 km^{2}), all land.

== History ==
Chester, located in the northwestern corner of the county, was named after President Chester A. Arthur. It was formed in 1883 when the Trinity and Sabine Railway, which connected Colmesneil in the east to Trinity in the west, routed its new line just a few miles south and west of the earlier community of Peach Tree Village. The community moved the post office, Mount Hope Masonic Lodge, and several businesses to the area alongside the track. A. B. Green, postmaster of Peach Tree Village, became the first postmaster of the new postoffice named Chester. The town of Chester incorporated in 1968.

== Demographics ==
Historical population
Census	Pop.	Note	%±
1970	260		—
1980	305		17.3%
1990	285		−6.6%
2000	265		−7.0%
2010	312		17.7%
2020	270		−13.5%
U.S. Decennial Census; 2020 Census

As of the census of 2000, 265 people, 101 households, and 75 families resided in the town. The population density was 166.1 inhabitants per square mile (64.1/km^{2}). The 128 housing units averaged 80.2 per square mile (30.9/km^{2}). The racial makeup of the town was 97.74% White, 0.38% Asian, 1.13% from other races, and 0.75% from two or more races. Hispanics or Latino of any race were 3.40% of the population.

Of the 101 households, 32.7% had children under the age of 18 living with them, 63.4% were married couples living together, 6.9% had a female householder with no husband present, and 25.7% were not families. About 20.8% of all households were made up of individuals, and 10.9% had someone living alone who was 65 years of age or older. The average household size was 2.62 and the average family size was 3.08.

In the town, the population was distributed as 23.0% under the age of 18, 12.1% from 18 to 24, 29.8% from 25 to 44, 21.5% from 45 to 64, and 13.6% who were 65 years of age or older. The median age was 33 years. For every 100 females, there were 89.3 males. For every 100 females age 18 and over, there were 85.5 males.

The median income for a household in the town was $40,313, and for a family was $46,875. Males had a median income of $30,536 versus $14,750 for females. The per capita income for the town was $14,659. About 3.8% of families and 5.8% of the population were below the poverty line, including 3.0% of those under the age of 18 and 7.9% of those 65 or over.

== Education ==
The Town of Chester is served by the Chester Independent School District.
