= KTXJ-FM =

- Jasper, Texas; United States
- Frequency: 102.7 MHz
- Branding: Southern Gospel Radio

Programming
- Format: Southern gospel

Ownership
- Owner: CrossTexas Media, Inc.

History
- First air date: 1965
- Former call signs: KTXJ-FM (1965–1981); KWYX (1981–2003)
- Call sign meaning: Texas Jasper

Technical information
- Licensing authority: FCC
- Facility ID: 35708
- Class: C2
- ERP: 46,000 watts
- HAAT: 156.3 meters (513 ft)
- Transmitter coordinates: 31°03′36″N 93°57′42″W

Links
- Public license information: Public file; LMS
- Webcast: Listen live
- Website: 1027ktxj.com

KTXJ-FM (102.7 MHz) is a radio station broadcasting a southern gospel format licensed to Jasper, Texas, United States. The station is owned by CrossTexas Media, Inc.
