= Ivanhoe, Tyler County, Texas =

Ivanhoe
- City
- Location within the state of Texas
- Coordinates: 30°40′48″N 94°24′55″W
- Country: United States
- State: Texas
- County: Tyler
- Incorporated: 2009

Area
  - Total: 3.63 sq mi (9.41 km^{2})
  - Land: 3.18 sq mi (8.24 km^{2})
  - Water: 0.45 sq mi (1.17 km^{2})
- Elevation: 197 ft (60 m)

Population (2020)
  - Total: 1,327
  - Density: 451.2/sq mi (174.21/km^{2})
- Time zone: UTC-6 (Central (CST))
  - Summer (DST): UTC-5 (CDT)
- FIPS code: 48-37112
- GNIS feature ID: 2575704
- Website: cityofivanhoe.texas.gov

Ivanhoe is a city in Tyler County, Texas, United States. The population was 1,327 at the 2020 census.

In an election held on November 3, 2009, residents voted to incorporate the community as a "Class C" municipality, with 160 votes to 53. In a concurrent election, Bill Preston was elected unopposed as mayor. A total of eight candidates ran for the two city commissioner positions. Cathy Bennett and Will Warren won those seats.

The incorporation of Ivanhoe coincided with the incorporation of a neighboring community, Ivanhoe North. The creation of both cities was seen as the first step in a process to merge both communities into a single entity, making it the second-largest city in Tyler County.

The merger of both cities into one City of Ivanhoe was approved by a vote of 194 to 60 on November 2, 2010.

== Geography ==
Ivanhoe had a total area of 3.6 square miles (9.3 km^{2}), of which 3.3 square miles (8.5 km^{2}) were land and 0.3 square miles (0.78 km^{2}) was covered by water. These are 2010 numbers, before the merger with Ivanhoe North.

== Demographics ==
Historical population
| Census | Pop. | Note | %± |
|---|---|---|---|
| 2010 | 887 | | — |
| 2020 | 1,327 | | 49.6% |
U.S. Decennial Census

Ivanhoe racial composition as of 2020 (NH = Non-Hispanic) (Note: Note: the US Census treats Hispanic/Latino as an ethnic category. This table excludes Latinos from the racial categories and assigns them to a separate category. Hispanics/Latinos can be of any race.)
| Race | Number | Percentage |
|---|---|---|
| White (NH) | 1,048 | 78.98% |
| Black or African American (NH) | 50 | 3.77% |
| Native American or Alaska Native (NH) | 4 | 0.3% |
| Asian (NH) | 4 | 0.3% |
| Some Other Race (NH) | 5 | 0.38% |
| Mixed/Multi-Racial (NH) | 72 | 5.43% |
| Hispanic or Latino | 144 | 10.85% |
| Total | 1,327 | |

As of the 2020 United States census, there were 1,327 people, 706 households, and 391 families residing in the city.

== Education ==
Part of Ivanhoe to the southwest is in the Warren Independent School District while the other part, to the northeast, is in the Woodville Independent School District.

The Texas Legislature designates Tyler County as being in the district of Angelina College.
