= Spurger Independent School District =

School district in Texas, United States

Address
- 12212 FM 92 Spurger, Texas, 77660; United States

District information
- Type: Public
- Grades: PK–12
- Schools: 2
- NCES District ID: 4841340

Students and staff
- Students: 368 (2023–2024)
- Teachers: 41.71 (on an FTE basis) (2023–2024)
- Staff: 36.85 (on an FTE basis) (2023–2024)
- Student–teacher ratio: 8.82 (2023–2024)

Other information
- Website: www.spurgerisd.org

Spurger Independent School District is a public school district based in the community of Spurger, Texas (USA). It contains an elementary school and a combined middle/high school.

In 2009, the school district was rated "recognized" by the Texas Education Agency.
