= Tyler County Courthouse (Texas) =

- U.S. National Register of Historic Places
- Recorded Texas Historic Landmark
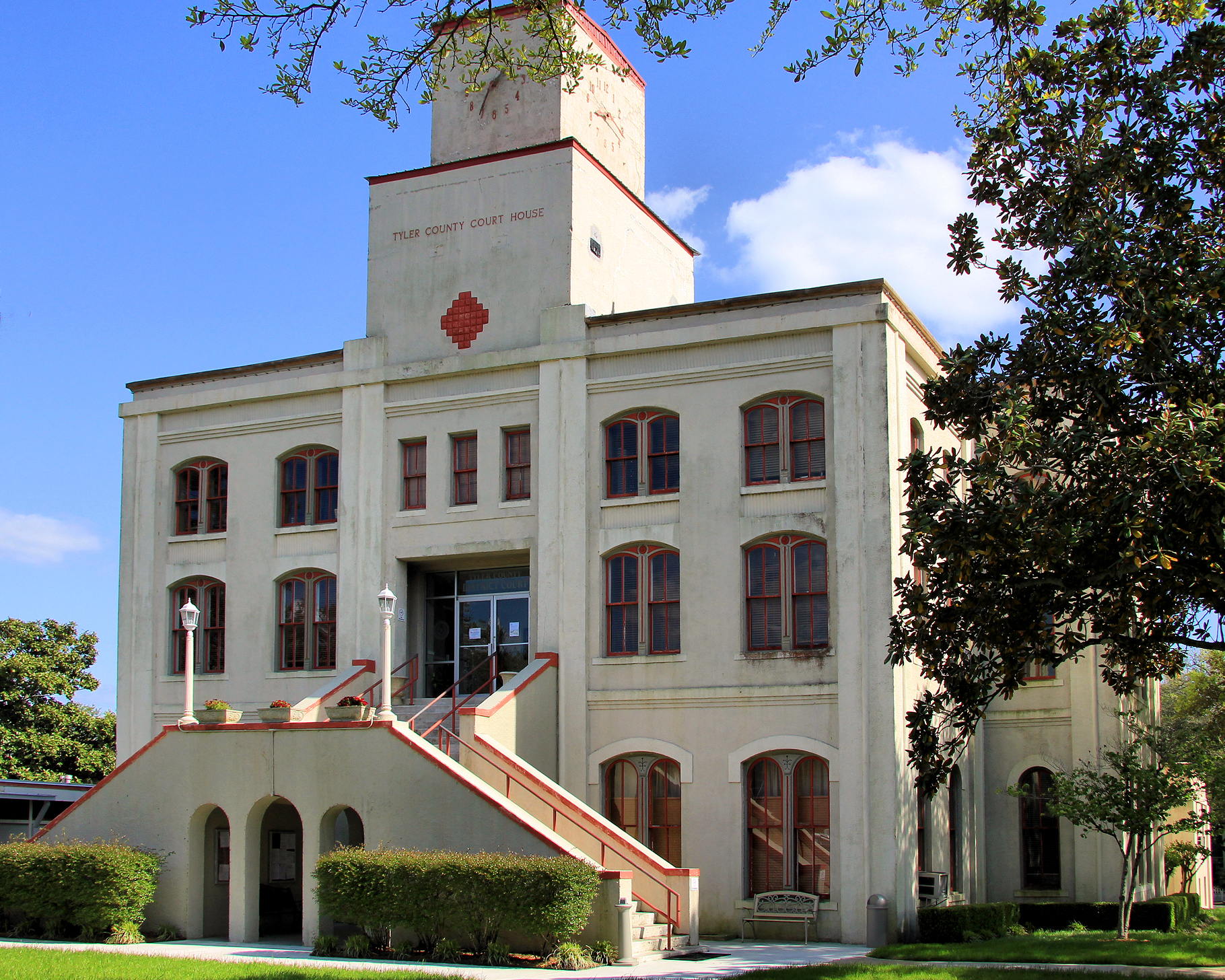
- Tyler County Courthouse in 2014

- Location within Texas Location within the United States
- Interactive map showing the location for Tyler County Courthouse
- Location: 104 W. Bluff Street, Woodville, Texas
- Coordinates: 30°46′32″N 94°24′55″W
- Area: less than one acre
- Built: 1891
- Built by: McKnight Brothers
- Architect: T.S. Hodges, W.C. Meador
- Architectural style: Moderne, Late Victorian
- NRHP reference No.: 15000247
- RTHL No.: 12432

Significant dates
- Added to NRHP: May 18, 2015
- Designated RTHL: 2000

The Tyler County Courthouse in Woodville, Texas was built in 1891.

It was a red brick building in Italianate style when built. A 1936 renovation added stucco. Tallish, narrow windows topped by arches are among remnants of Italianate style.

It was the third courthouse built on the courthouse square.

The building received emergency electrical rewiring work in 2004.

== See also ==
- National Register of Historic Places listings in Tyler County, Texas
- Recorded Texas Historic Landmarks in Tyler County
