= Lake Lucy =

Lake in the state of Minnesota, United States

- Location within Minnesota
- Location: Carver County, Minnesota
- Coordinates: 44°52′40″N 93°33′34″W
- Type: lake

Lake Lucy is a lake in Carver County, Minnesota, in the United States. The lake was named for the wife of Burritt S. Judd, an early settler.

== See also ==
- List of lakes in Minnesota
