= Jasper, Texas =

City in and county seat of Jasper County, Texas, United States

Jasper
- City
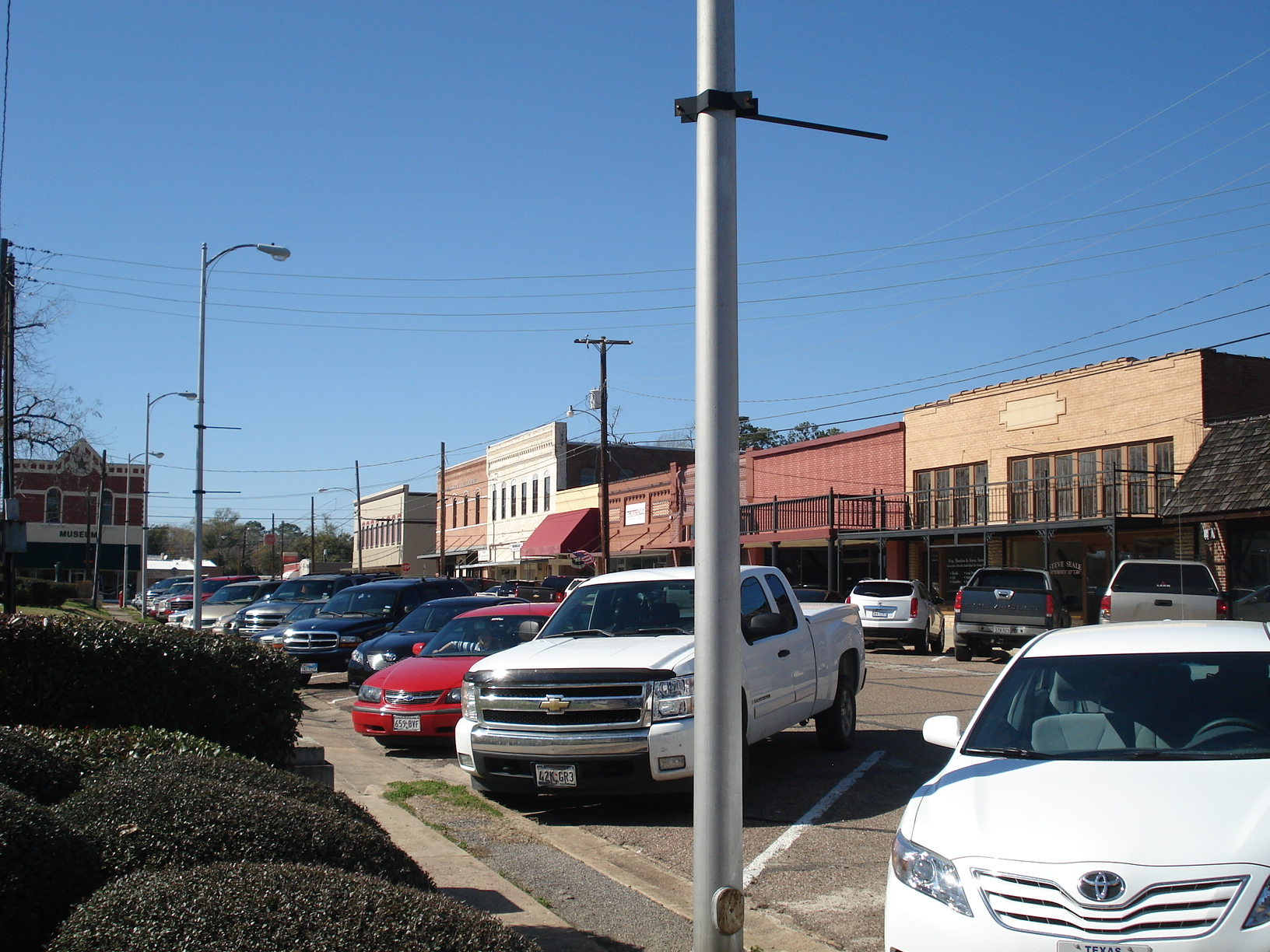
- Downtown Jasper from corner of Lamar and Austin
- Motto: "Jewel of the Forest"
- Location of Jasper, Texas

- Location within Texas Location within the United States
- Coordinates: 30°55′15″N 94°0′2″W
- Country: United States
- State: Texas
- County: Jasper

Government
  - Type: Council-Manager

Area
  - Total: 10.46 sq mi (27.09 km^{2})
  - Land: 10.45 sq mi (27.06 km^{2})
  - Water: 0.012 sq mi (0.03 km^{2})
- Elevation: 207 ft (63 m)

Population (2020)
  - Total: 6,884
  - Density: 722.8/sq mi (279.09/km^{2})
- Time zone: UTC−6 (Central (CST))
  - Summer (DST): UTC−5 (CDT)
- ZIP code: 75951
- Area code: 409
- FIPS code: 48-37420
- GNIS feature ID: 2410134
- Website: jaspertx.org

Jasper is a city in and the county seat of Jasper County, Texas, United States. Its population was 6,884 at the 2020 U.S. census, down from 7,590 at the 2010 U.S. census. Jasper is situated in the Deep East Texas subregion, about 40 miles (64 km) west of the Texas-Louisiana state line. Jasper (the "Butterfly Capital of Texas") holds an annual Butterfly Festival the first Saturday in October to celebrate the migration of the monarch butterflies.

== History ==
=== 19th century ===
The area, which was then part of Mexican Texas, was settled around 1824 by John Bevil. Thirty families occupied the settlement as early as 1830, when it was known as "Snow River", after John R. Bevil, a hero of the American Revolution.

In 1835, the town was renamed after William Jasper, a soldier from the American Revolution, who was killed attempting to plant the American flag at the storming of Savannah in 1779. Jasper was one of the 23 original counties when the Republic of Texas was created in 1836. Jasper became the county seat in 1844 and became part of the United States with the annexation of Texas in 1845.

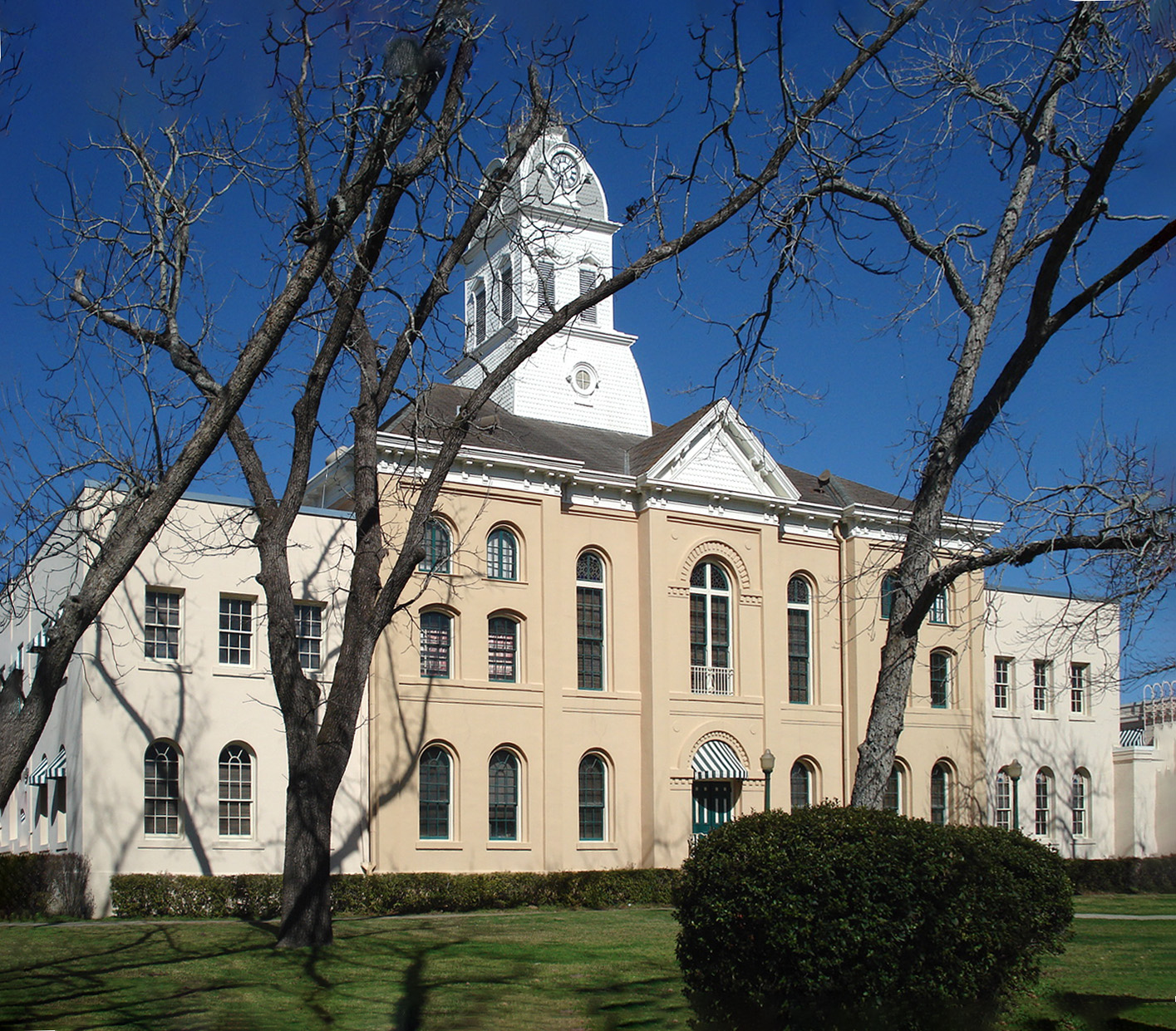
The Jasper County Courthouse, January 2011

During the Civil War, the town housed a Confederate quartermaster depot and served as a major center for Confederate communication, transportation, and supply. Jasper was a Confederate Army headquarters for a nine-county area. Following the war, Union troops led by General George Custer occupied Jasper, camping in the town square.

Educational institutions included the Jasper Male and Female High School, which operated until 1878, when it became the Southeast Texas Male and Female College, and Jasper Collegiate Institute, which operated from 1851 until 1874. The population declined to 360 in 1870, reflecting the hardships of the Civil War, but by 1885 had risen to 1,000.

In 1896, Jasper had a population of 1,200. With the arrival of the Gulf, Colorado and Santa Fe Railway early in the 20th century, Jasper grew into a center for the manufacture of timber products. Lumber from two sawmills, with a daily capacity of 125,000 board feet (290 m^{3}), goods from basket and stave factories, logs, ties, poles, and pulpwood were shipped in 200 cars per month.

=== 20th century ===
In 1901, the town of Jasper was robbed. The post office safe and the county treasurer's safe were blown open and robbed. The thieves set a fire, and as the town had no fire department, the entire town was completely destroyed. Damages were estimated at $100,000. What was stolen from the safes was unknown. The thieves escaped.

Jasper served as headquarters for the Lower Neches Valley Authority's construction program, including Dam "B" at Town Bluff and engineering and surveying for a dam at Magee Bend on the Angelina River. Local farmers raised broiler chickens and beef, and in the 1950s turned to dairying. Jasper also became the headquarters of the Morgan and Lindsey chain of variety stores (otherwise known as dime-stores), which at one time operated 85 outlets in Texas, Arkansas, Louisiana, Mississippi, and Alabama.

In June 1998, the murder of James Byrd Jr. catapulted Jasper into national news and led to the creation of the Matthew Shepard and James Byrd Jr. Hate Crimes Prevention Act. Three men—John William King, Lawrence Russell Brewer, and Shawn Berry—were tried and convicted of capital murder. King and Brewer received the death penalty, while Berry, who was the only suspect who cooperated during the investigation and implicated King and Brewer, was sentenced to life in prison. Brewer was executed on September 21, 2011. King was executed on April 24, 2019.

=== 21st century ===
In 2000, Jasper had 8,247 residents and around 250 businesses. Jasper was one of the primary locations for the recovery of the Space Shuttle Columbia wreckage in February 2003.

Jasper was greatly affected by Hurricane Rita on September 25, 2005, as it moved inland. The city suffered considerable damage and was left without power or potable water for about three and a half weeks.

The Jasper Arboretum Project began in 2000, and the Outdoor Learning Center was added in 2012 to create 14 acres (5.7 ha) of public gardens, walking trails, a master gardener greenhouse, and a nature classroom.

In 2012, Jasper returned to national attention during a bitterly fought political feud over the hiring and firing of Jasper's first black police chief, Rodney Pearson. To fire Pearson, two black city council members were recalled in the narrowly divided city. Free of Voting Rights Act preclearance requirements, Jasper is moving to annex largely white suburbs. The feud highlighted Jasper's persistent struggle with racism throughout its history.

On July 8, 2024, the western part of Jasper was struck by a low-end EF2 tornado that was spawned by the outer bands of Hurricane Beryl. Many trees, power poles, and structures were damaged, and one person was injured.

== Geography ==
The city of Jasper is in northern Jasper County, with U.S. Routes 190 and 96 crossing south of the city center. US 190 leads southeast 16 miles (26 km) to Newton and southwest 27 miles (43 km) to Woodville, while US 96 leads north 45 miles (72 km) to San Augustine and south 70 miles (110 km) to Beaumont. Texas State Highway 63 passes through Jasper with US 190, but leads northeast 21 miles (34 km) to Burkeville and northwest 32 miles (51 km) to Zavalla.

According to the United States Census Bureau, Jasper has a total area of 10.5 square miles (27.1 km^{2}), of which 0.01 square miles (0.03 km^{2}), or 0.11%, are covered by water. Sandy Creek runs passes just south of the city center, flowing west to the Neches River in B. A. Steinhagen Lake.

=== Climate ===
Climate data for Jasper
Month	Jan	Feb	Mar	Apr	May	Jun	Jul	Aug	Sep	Oct	Nov	Dec	Year
Mean daily maximum °F (°C)	58.3 (14.6)	63.4 (17.4)	70.9 (21.6)	78.7 (25.9)	84.5 (29.2)	89.8 (32.1)	92.8 (33.8)	93.3 (34.1)	87.9 (31.1)	80.5 (26.9)	70.9 (21.6)	62.4 (16.9)	77.8 (25.4)
Daily mean °F (°C)	46.9 (8.3)	50.7 (10.4)	58.4 (14.7)	66.4 (19.1)	72.5 (22.5)	78.1 (25.6)	80.8 (27.1)	80.9 (27.2)	75.5 (24.2)	66.7 (19.3)	58.2 (14.6)	49.8 (9.9)	65.4 (18.6)
Mean daily minimum °F (°C)	35.5 (1.9)	38.0 (3.3)	45.9 (7.7)	54.0 (12.2)	60.5 (15.8)	66.3 (19.1)	68.7 (20.4)	68.3 (20.2)	63.1 (17.3)	52.7 (11.5)	45.4 (7.4)	37.2 (2.9)	53.0 (11.7)
Average precipitation inches (mm)	4.4 (110)	4.4 (110)	4.4 (110)	3.7 (94)	5.6 (140)	5.3 (130)	3.8 (97)	3.6 (91)	4.1 (100)	3.6 (91)	4.6 (120)	5.3 (130)	52.7 (1,340)
Average snowfall inches (cm)	0 (0)	0 (0)	0 (0)	0 (0)	0 (0)	0 (0)	0 (0)	0 (0)	0 (0)	0 (0)	0 (0)	0 (0)	0 (0)
Source: Weatherbase "Jasper Climate". Weatherbase.

== Demographics ==
Historical population
Census	Pop.	Note	%±
1880	377		—
1930	3,393		—
1940	3,497		3.1%
1950	4,403		25.9%
1960	4,889		11.0%
1970	6,251		27.9%
1980	6,959		11.3%
1990	6,959		0.0%
2000	8,247		18.5%
2010	7,590		−8.0%
2020	6,884		−9.3%
U.S. Decennial Census

As of the 2020 census, there were 6,884 people, 2,726 households, and 1,997 families residing in the city.

=== Racial and ethnic composition ===
Jasper city, Texas – Racial and ethnic composition Note: the US Census treats Hispanic/Latino as an ethnic category. This table excludes Latinos from the racial categories and assigns them to a separate category. Hispanics/Latinos may be of any race.
Race / Ethnicity (NH = Non-Hispanic)	Pop 2000	Pop 2010	Pop 2020	% 2000	% 2010	% 2020
White alone (NH)	3,767	3,177	2,604	45.68%	41.86%	37.83%
Black or African American alone (NH)	3,595	3,357	3,101	43.59%	44.23%	45.05%
Native American or Alaska Native alone (NH)	25	23	10	0.30%	0.30%	0.15%
Asian alone (NH)	57	111	44	0.69%	1.46%	0.64%
Pacific Islander alone (NH)	0	0	8	0.00%	0.00%	0.12%
Other Race alone (NH)	2	10	23	0.02%	0.13%	0.33%
Mixed race or Multiracial (NH)	95	90	216	1.15%	1.19%	3.14%
Hispanic or Latino (any race)	706	722	878	8.56%	10.83%	12.75%
Total	8,247	7,590	6,884	100.00%	100.00%	100.00%

=== 2020 census ===
Per the 2020 census, the median age was 39.5 years. 24.6% of residents were under the age of 18 and 19.5% of residents were 65 years of age or older. For every 100 females there were 86.9 males, and for every 100 females age 18 and over there were 83.1 males age 18 and over.

Of the 2,726 households, 31.6% had children under the age of 18 living in them. Of all households, 34.4% were married-couple households, 20.5% were households with a male householder and no spouse or partner present, and 39.9% were households with a female householder and no spouse or partner present. About 33.4% of all households were made up of individuals and 14.8% had someone living alone who was 65 years of age or older.

There were 3,324 housing units, of which 18.0% were vacant. The homeowner vacancy rate was 2.4% and the rental vacancy rate was 14.8%.

94.2% of residents lived in urban areas, while 5.8% lived in rural areas.

Racial composition as of the 2020 census
Race	Number	Percent
White	2,774	40.3%
Black or African American	3,111	45.2%
American Indian and Alaska Native	29	0.4%
Asian	49	0.7%
Native Hawaiian and Other Pacific Islander	8	0.1%
Some other race	540	7.8%
Two or more races	373	5.4%
Hispanic or Latino (of any race)	878	12.8%

=== 2010 census ===
At the census of 2010, 7,590 people (compared with 8,247 people in the 2000 census), 2,890 households, and 1,892 families resided in the city. The population density was 733.9 inhabitants per square mile (283.4/km^{2}). The 3,445 housing units averaged 333.1 per square mile (128.7/km^{2}). The major racial and ethnic groups in the city, as a percentage of the total city population, were: 64.2% non-Hispanic African American; 41.9% non-Hispanic White; 10.8% Hispanic or Latino of any race; and 1.5% Asian, with the remaining 1.6% mainly consisting of non-Hispanics of two or more races. The Hispanic or Latino population was subdivided (as a percentage of total city population) into 5.9% other races, 3.9% White, 78% African American, and 1.1% in other categories, mainly two or more races.

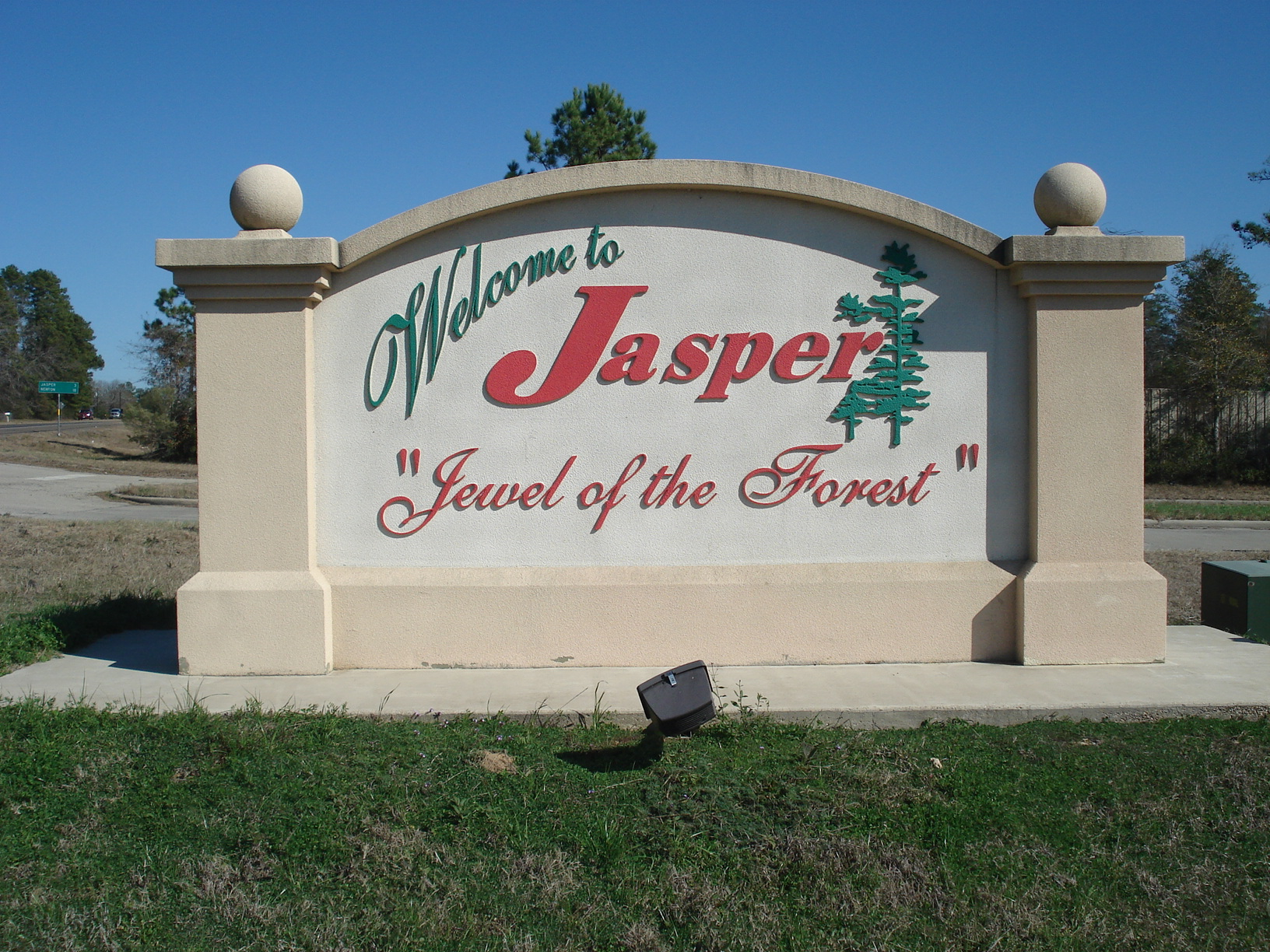
Welcome sign coming in from U.S. Route 190 West

Of the 2,888 households, 34.4% had children under the age of 18 living with them, 44.7% were married couples living together, 20.3% had a female householder with no husband present, and 31.0% were not families. About 27.6% of all households were made up of individuals, and 12.6% had someone living alone who was 65 years of age or older. The average household size was 2.54 and the average family size was 3.20.

In the city, the population was distributed as 29.4% under the age of 18, 8.3% from 18 to 24, 22.8% from 25 to 44, 24.3% from 45 to 64, and 15.2% who were 65 years of age or older. The median age was 35 years. For every 100 females, there were 82.3 males. For every 100 females age 18 and over, there were 77.1 males.

== Economy ==
The median income for a household in the city was $24,671, and for a family was $32,242. Males had a median income of $28,432 versus $17,266 for females. The per capita income for the city was $12,997. About 23.3% of families and 28.4% of the population were below the poverty line, including 34.3% of those under age 18 and 23.3% of those age 65 or over.

== Government ==
Jasper is administered by a city council of six members. The council is composed of five council members and an elected mayor, accompanied by a hired city manager under the manager-council system of municipal governance.

The council is elected under four single-member districts (numbered 1 through 4), and one at-large district (numbered 5 ); the mayor is elected at-large.

== Parks and recreation ==
Sam Rayburn Reservoir, about 14 miles (23 km) north of Jasper, is visited by thousands of vacationers each year; it is the largest lake wholly within the state of Texas. B. A. Steinhagen Lake is about 11 miles (18 km) west.

== Education ==
The city is served by the Jasper Independent School District and Vista Academy of Jasper.

The school district partners with Lamar Institute of Technology and Stephen F. Austin State University.

The Texas Legislature designated Jasper ISD as being in the boundary of Angelina College's district.

The city operates the Jasper Public Library.

== Media ==
A weekly newspaper, the Jasper Newsboy, has been published continuously since 1865. It is considered the oldest continuously published weekly newspaper in Texas.

The area is served by:

- KJAS radio 107.3 FM
- KTXJ radio 102.7 FM
- KCOX radio 1350 AM
- KVHP-LD television 34

== Notable people ==
- Don Adams, Texas legislator and lobbyist
- Max Alvis, former Major League Baseball (MLB) third baseman, born in Jasper
- Derick Armstrong, Canadian football wide receiver, born in Jasper
- Zack Bronson, former football safety in the NFL for the San Francisco 49ers, born in Jasper
- Red Bryant, American football defensive end for the Arizona Cardinals, raised in Jasper
- James Byrd Jr., dragged to death behind a pick-up truck in 1998
- James Hadnot, former running back for the Kansas City Chiefs.
- Phil Hennigan, former MLB pitcher for the Cleveland Indians and New York Mets, born in Jasper
- Robert Hunt, professional football player for the Miami Dolphins
- Roger Mobley, a pastor in Jasper and a child actor in the 1950s and 1960s
- SirVincent Rogers, former professional football player
- Michael Sarver, singer/songwriter, American Idol contestant
- Eugene Seale, former professional football player
- Clay Strother, former US National Team Gymnast 2001-2008, 4x NCAA Champion
- Sean Weatherspoon, former professional football player, raised in Jasper

== See also ==
- List of municipalities in Texas
