= Lake Elsie =

Lake in the state of North Dakota, United States

- Location within North Dakota
- Location: Richland County, North Dakota
- Coordinates: 46°02′43″N 96°55′54″W
- Type: lake
- Basin countries: United States
- Surface area: 376 acres (1.52 km^{2})
- Max. depth: 23 ft (7.0 m)
- Surface elevation: 1,076 ft (328 m)

Lake Elsie is a lake in Richland County, in the U.S. state of North Dakota.

The lake was named for Elsie Hankinson, the daughter of the founder and namesake of Hankinson, North Dakota.

== See also ==
- List of lakes in North Dakota
