= Tyler County, Texas =

County in Texas, United States

- County
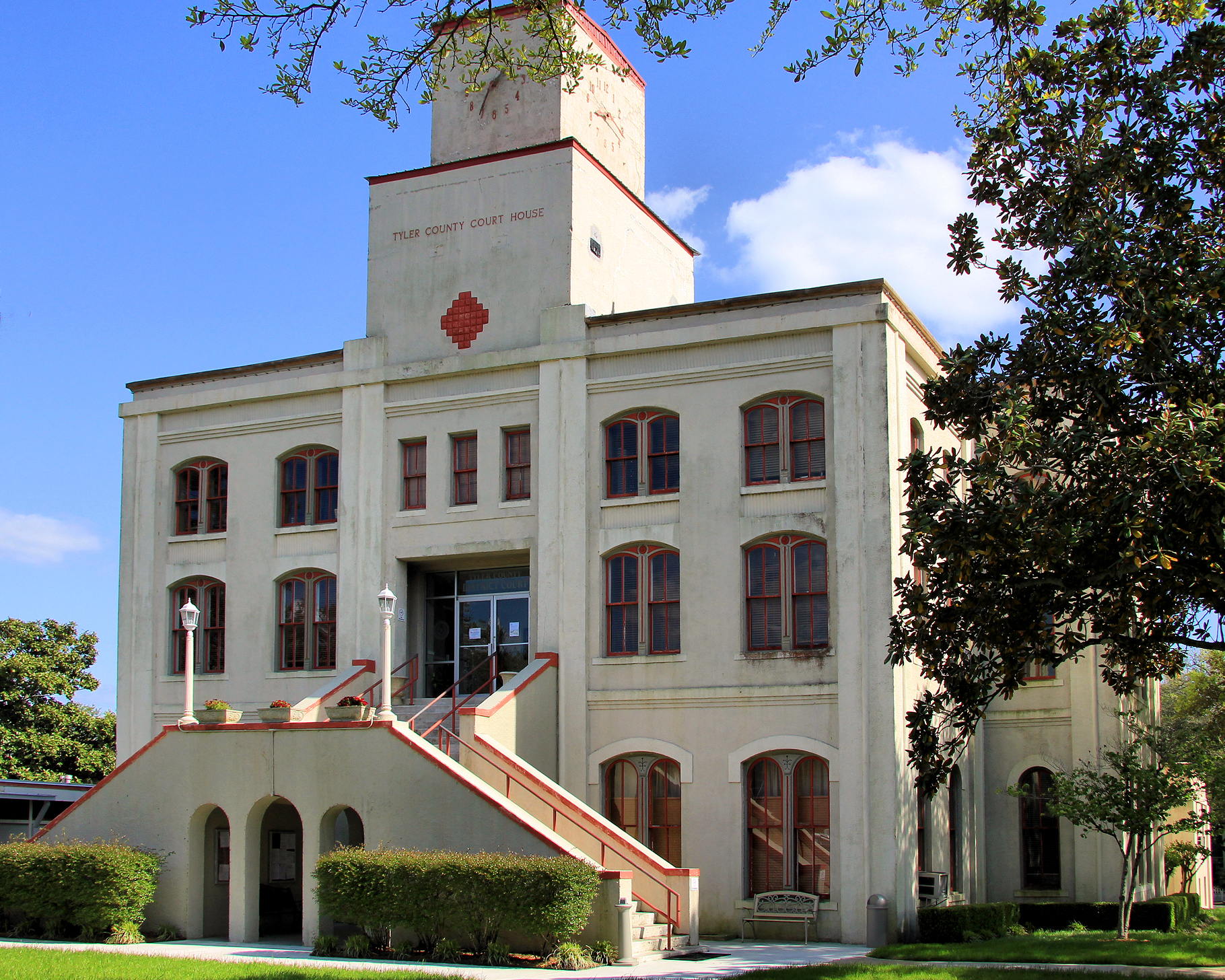
- The Tyler County Courthouse in Woodville

- Location within the U.S. state of Texas
- Coordinates: 30°46′N 94°23′W
- Country: United States
- State: Texas
- Founded: 1846
- Named for: John Tyler
- Seat: Woodville
- Largest town: Woodville

Area
  - Total: 936 sq mi (2,420 km^{2})
  - Land: 925 sq mi (2,400 km^{2})
  - Water: 11 sq mi (28 km^{2}) 1.2%

Population (2020)
  - Total: 19,798
  - Estimate (2025): 20,443 ▲
  - Density: 21/sq mi (8.1/km^{2})
- Time zone: UTC−6 (Central)
  - Summer (DST): UTC−5 (CDT)
- Congressional district: 36th
- Website: www.co.tyler.tx.us

Tyler County is a county located in the U.S. state of Texas. It is in East Texas and its seat is Woodville. As of the 2020 census, its population was 19,798. Tyler County is named for John Tyler, the 10th President of the United States. Despite its name, Tyler County does not contain the city of Tyler, Texas; the latter is located about 140 miles to the north in Smith County.

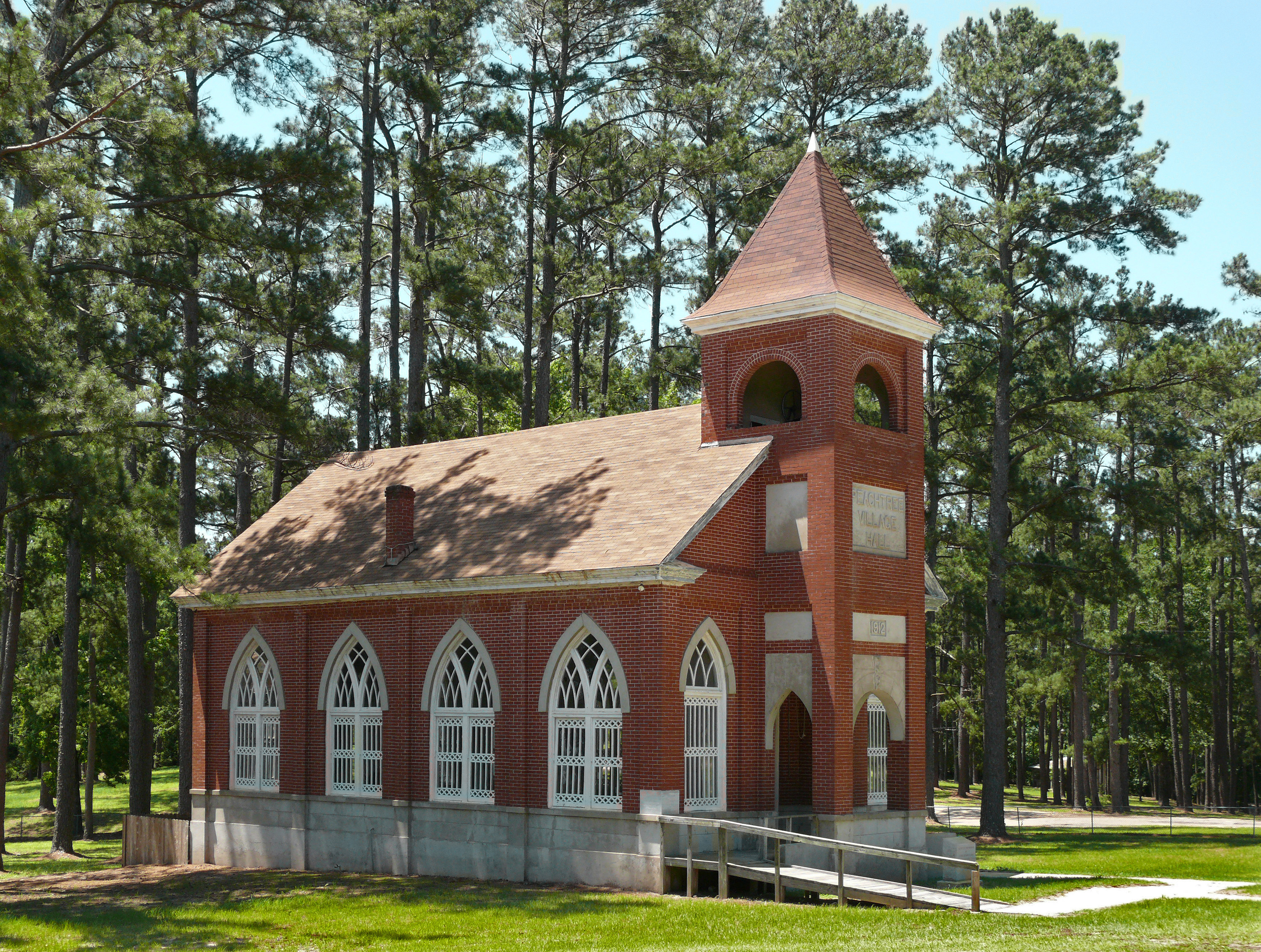
Peach Tree Village -- Tyler County, Texas. Settled in the late 17th century by the Alabama tribe

== Geography ==
According to the U.S. Census Bureau, the county has a total area of 936 square miles (2,420 km^{2}), of which 925 square miles (2,400 km^{2}) are land and 11 square miles (28 km^{2}) (1.2%) are covered by water.

=== Major highways ===
- U.S. Highway 69
- U.S. Highway 190
- U.S. Highway 287
- Recreational Road 255

=== Adjacent counties ===
- Angelina County (north)
- Jasper County (east)
- Hardin County (south)
- Polk County (west)

=== National protected area ===
- Big Thicket National Preserve (part)

== Demographics ==
Historical population
| Census | Pop. | Note | %± |
|---|---|---|---|
| 1850 | 1,894 | | — |
| 1860 | 4,525 | | 138.9% |
| 1870 | 5,010 | | 10.7% |
| 1880 | 5,825 | | 16.3% |
| 1890 | 10,877 | | 86.7% |
| 1900 | 11,899 | | 9.4% |
| 1910 | 10,250 | | −13.9% |
| 1920 | 10,415 | | 1.6% |
| 1930 | 11,448 | | 9.9% |
| 1940 | 11,948 | | 4.4% |
| 1950 | 11,292 | | −5.5% |
| 1960 | 10,666 | | −5.5% |
| 1970 | 12,417 | | 16.4% |
| 1980 | 16,223 | | 30.7% |
| 1990 | 16,646 | | 2.6% |
| 2000 | 20,871 | | 25.4% |
| 2010 | 21,766 | | 4.3% |
| 2020 | 19,798 | | −9.0% |
| 2025 (est.) | 20,443 | ▲ | 3.3% |
U.S. Decennial Census; 1850–2010 2010 2020

=== Racial and ethnic composition ===
Tyler County, Texas – Racial and ethnic composition Note: the US Census treats Hispanic/Latino as an ethnic category. This table excludes Latinos from the racial categories and assigns them to a separate category. Hispanics/Latinos may be of any race.
| Race / Ethnicity (NH = Non-Hispanic) | Pop 1980 | Pop 1990 | Pop 2000 | Pop 2010 | Pop 2020 | % 1980 | % 1990 | % 2000 | % 2010 | % 2020 |
|---|---|---|---|---|---|---|---|---|---|---|
| White alone (NH) | 13,936 | 14,426 | 17,290 | 17,507 | 15,302 | 85.90% | 86.66% | 82.84% | 80.43% | 77.29% |
| Black or African American alone (NH) | 2,094 | 1,986 | 2,491 | 2,376 | 2,040 | 12.91% | 11.93% | 11.94% | 10.92% | 10.30% |
| Native American or Alaska Native alone (NH) | 37 | 45 | 87 | 104 | 111 | 0.23% | 0.27% | 0.42% | 0.48% | 0.56% |
| Asian alone (NH) | 13 | 12 | 41 | 49 | 97 | 0.08% | 0.07% | 0.20% | 0.23% | 0.49% |
| Native Hawaiian or Pacific Islander alone (NH) | x | x | 4 | 6 | 3 | x | x | 0.02% | 0.03% | 0.02% |
| Other race alone (NH) | 9 | 0 | 17 | 19 | 47 | 0.06% | 0.00% | 0.08% | 0.09% | 0.24% |
| Mixed race or Multiracial (NH) | x | x | 199 | 218 | 678 | x | x | 0.95% | 1.00% | 3.42% |
| Hispanic or Latino (any race) | 134 | 177 | 742 | 1,487 | 1,520 | 0.83% | 1.06% | 3.56% | 6.83% | 7.68% |
| Total | 16,223 | 16,646 | 20,871 | 21,766 | 19,798 | 100.00% | 100.00% | 100.00% | 100.00% | 100.00% |

=== 2020 census ===
As of the 2020 census, the county had a population of 19,798. The median age was 45.8 years. 19.3% of residents were under the age of 18 and 23.6% of residents were 65 years of age or older. For every 100 females there were 116.8 males, and for every 100 females age 18 and over there were 120.8 males age 18 and over.

The racial makeup of the county was 78.9% White, 10.4% Black or African American, 0.6% American Indian and Alaska Native, 0.5% Asian, <0.1% Native Hawaiian and Pacific Islander, 4.7% from some other race, and 4.8% from two or more races. Hispanic or Latino residents of any race comprised 7.7% of the population.

<0.1% of residents lived in urban areas, while 100.0% lived in rural areas.

There were 7,362 households in the county, of which 26.3% had children under the age of 18 living in them. Of all households, 51.0% were married-couple households, 19.3% were households with a male householder and no spouse or partner present, and 25.5% were households with a female householder and no spouse or partner present. About 28.7% of all households were made up of individuals and 16.0% had someone living alone who was 65 years of age or older.

There were 9,406 housing units, of which 21.7% were vacant. Among occupied housing units, 82.8% were owner-occupied and 17.2% were renter-occupied. The homeowner vacancy rate was 2.8% and the rental vacancy rate was 12.7%.

=== 2000 census ===
As of the census of 2000, 20,871 people, 7,775 households, and 5,675 families resided in the county. The population density was 23 people per square mile (8.9 people/km^{2}). The 10,419 housing units averaged 11 units per square mile (4.2 units/km^{2}). The racial makeup of the county was 84.0% White, 12.0% African American, 0.4% Native American, 0.2% Asian, 2.52% from other races, and 1.1% from two or more races. About 3.6% of the population was Hispanic or Latino of any race.

Of the 7,775 households, 29.7% had children under the age of 18 living with them, 60.1% were married couples living together, 10.0% had a female householder with no husband present, and 27.0% were not families. About 24.3% of all households were made up of individuals, and 12.4% had someone living alone who was 65 years of age or older. The average household size was 2.5 and the average family size was 2.9.

In the county, the population was distributed as 23.2% under the age of 18, 8.0% from 18 to 24, 27.2% from 25 to 44, 23.8% from 45 to 64, and 17.8% who were 65 years of age or older. The median age was 39 years. For every 100 females, there were 106.9 males. For every 100 females age 18 and over, there were 108.2 males.

The median income for a household in the county was $29,808, and for a family was $35,195. Males had a median income of $31,797 versus $19,594 for females. The per capita income for the county was $15,367. About 12.6% of families and 15.8% of the population were below the poverty line, including 21.0% of those under age 18 and 10.1% of those age 65 or over.

== Communities ==
=== Cities ===
- Colmesneil
- Ivanhoe
- Woodville (county seat)

=== Towns ===
- Chester

=== Census-designated places ===
- Warren
- Wildwood (partly in Hardin County)

=== Unincorporated areas ===
- Doucette
- Fred
- Hillister
- Spurger

== Politics ==
=== United States Congress ===
| Senators | Name | Party | First Elected | Level |
|---|---|---|---|---|
| Senate Class 1 | John Cornyn | Republican | 2002 | Senior Senator |
| Senate Class 2 | Ted Cruz | Republican | 2012 | Junior Senator |
| Representatives | Name | Party | First Elected | Area(s) of Tyler County Represented |
| District 36 | Brian Babin | Republican | New district created with 2010 census. First elected 2014. | Entire county |

United States presidential election results for Tyler County, Texas
| Year | Republican | | Democratic | | Third party(ies) | |
| Year | No. | % | No. | % | No. | % |
|---|---|---|---|---|---|---|
| 1912 | 32 | 4.88% | 534 | 81.40% | 90 | 13.72% |
| 1916 | 24 | 3.48% | 635 | 92.03% | 31 | 4.49% |
| 1920 | 115 | 8.26% | 1,066 | 76.53% | 212 | 15.22% |
| 1924 | 90 | 8.62% | 929 | 88.98% | 25 | 2.39% |
| 1928 | 298 | 30.88% | 666 | 69.02% | 1 | 0.10% |
| 1932 | 44 | 2.94% | 1,450 | 96.99% | 1 | 0.07% |
| 1936 | 116 | 9.73% | 1,076 | 90.27% | 0 | 0.00% |
| 1940 | 228 | 14.65% | 1,326 | 85.22% | 2 | 0.13% |
| 1944 | 219 | 15.41% | 1,037 | 72.98% | 165 | 11.61% |
| 1948 | 177 | 11.41% | 895 | 57.70% | 479 | 30.88% |
| 1952 | 1,466 | 52.92% | 1,304 | 47.08% | 0 | 0.00% |
| 1956 | 1,734 | 68.24% | 797 | 31.37% | 10 | 0.39% |
| 1960 | 1,401 | 52.75% | 1,242 | 46.76% | 13 | 0.49% |
| 1964 | 1,216 | 40.04% | 1,818 | 59.86% | 3 | 0.10% |
| 1968 | 1,120 | 29.58% | 1,204 | 31.80% | 1,462 | 38.62% |
| 1972 | 2,955 | 68.88% | 1,321 | 30.79% | 14 | 0.33% |
| 1976 | 1,965 | 36.95% | 3,322 | 62.47% | 31 | 0.58% |
| 1980 | 2,545 | 41.08% | 3,540 | 57.14% | 110 | 1.78% |
| 1984 | 3,638 | 53.62% | 3,119 | 45.97% | 28 | 0.41% |
| 1988 | 3,070 | 42.10% | 4,198 | 57.57% | 24 | 0.33% |
| 1992 | 2,357 | 32.02% | 3,465 | 47.08% | 1,538 | 20.90% |
| 1996 | 2,804 | 41.11% | 3,340 | 48.97% | 677 | 9.93% |
| 2000 | 4,236 | 59.53% | 2,775 | 39.00% | 105 | 1.48% |
| 2004 | 5,043 | 65.11% | 2,659 | 34.33% | 43 | 0.56% |
| 2008 | 5,644 | 71.35% | 2,166 | 27.38% | 100 | 1.26% |
| 2012 | 5,910 | 77.21% | 1,668 | 21.79% | 76 | 0.99% |
| 2016 | 6,624 | 82.63% | 1,248 | 15.57% | 144 | 1.80% |
| 2020 | 8,194 | 84.71% | 1,403 | 14.50% | 76 | 0.79% |
| 2024 | 8,286 | 86.51% | 1,249 | 13.04% | 43 | 0.45% |

United States Senate election results for Tyler County, Texas1
| Year | Republican | | Democratic | | Third party(ies) | |
| Year | No. | % | No. | % | No. | % |
|---|---|---|---|---|---|---|
| 2024 | 8,001 | 84.16% | 1,337 | 14.06% | 169 | 1.78% |

United States Senate election results for Tyler County, Texas2
| Year | Republican | | Democratic | | Third party(ies) | |
| Year | No. | % | No. | % | No. | % |
|---|---|---|---|---|---|---|
| 2020 | 7,916 | 83.13% | 1,400 | 14.70% | 207 | 2.17% |

Texas Gubernatorial election results for Tyler County
| Year | Republican | | Democratic | | Third party(ies) | |
| Year | No. | % | No. | % | No. | % |
|---|---|---|---|---|---|---|
| 2022 | 6,343 | 87.54% | 816 | 11.26% | 87 | 1.20% |

== Education ==
School districts:

- Chester Independent School District
- Colmesneil Independent School District
- Spurger Independent School District
- Warren Independent School District
- Woodville Independent School District

The county is in the service area of Angelina College.

== See also ==
- National Register of Historic Places listings in Tyler County, Texas
- Recorded Texas Historic Landmarks in Tyler County
- Allan Shivers Library and Museum
