= Woodville, Texas =

Town in and county seat of Tyler County, Texas, United States

- Town
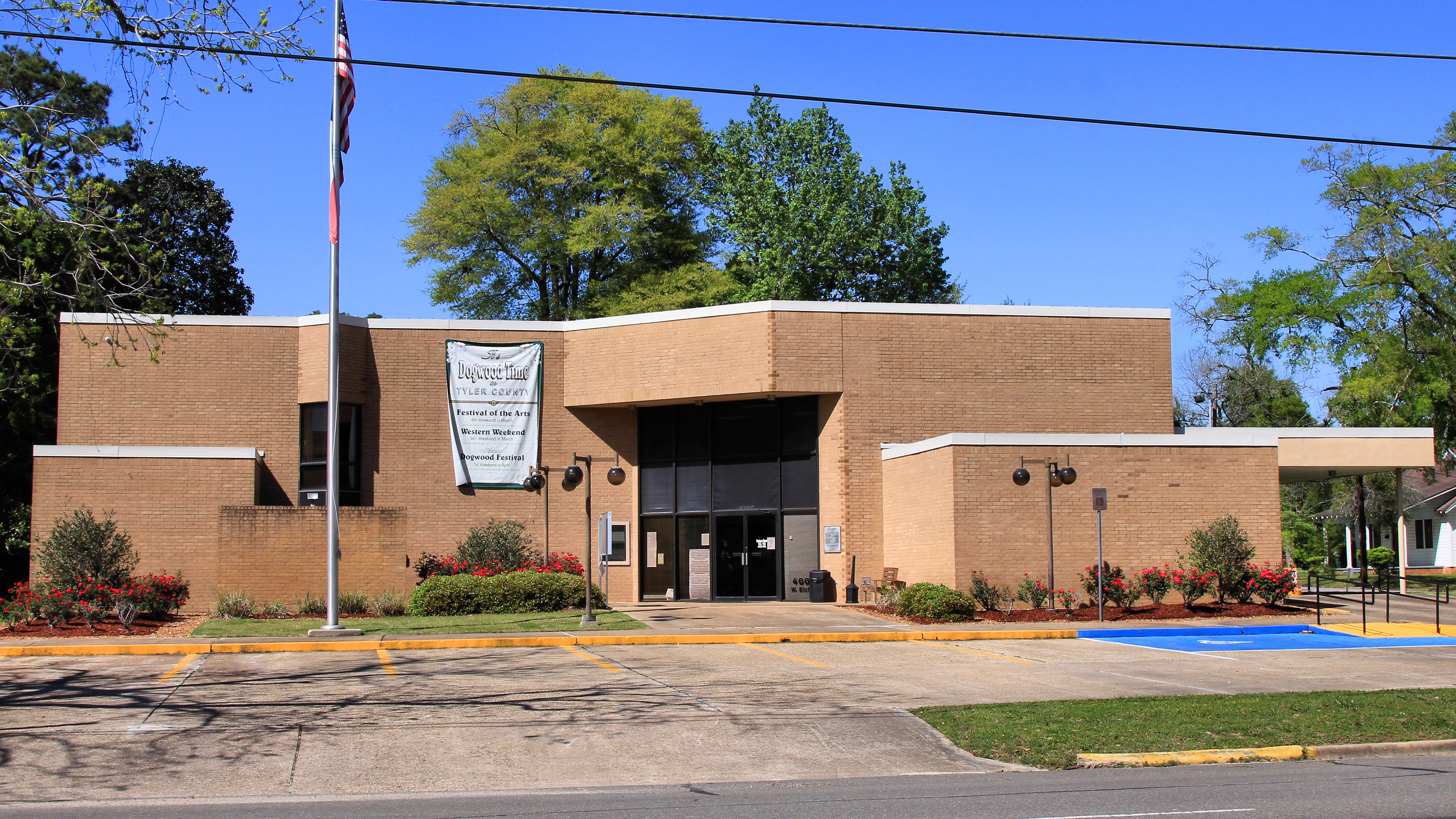
- City Hall

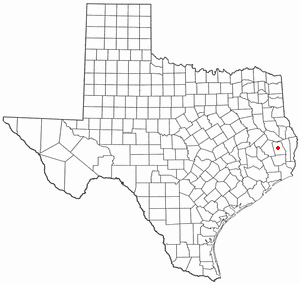
- Location of Woodville, Texas

- Coordinates: 30°46′26″N 94°25′24″W
- Country: United States
- State: Texas
- County: Tyler

Area
  - Total: 3.15 sq mi (8.15 km^{2})
  - Land: 3.15 sq mi (8.15 km^{2})
  - Water: 0 sq mi (0.00 km^{2})
- Elevation: 253 ft (77 m)

Population (2020)
  - Total: 2,403
  - Density: 772.0/sq mi (298.06/km^{2})
- Time zone: UTC-6 (Central (CST))
  - Summer (DST): UTC-5 (CDT)
- ZIP codes: 75979, 75990
- Area code: 409
- FIPS code: 48-80212
- GNIS feature ID: 2413511
- Website: http://www.woodville-tx.gov/

Woodville is a town in and the county seat of Tyler County, Texas, United States. The town is intersected by three U.S. Numbered Highways: U.S. Route 69, U.S. Route 190, and U.S. Route 287. The population was 2,403 at the 2020 census. It is the county seat of Tyler County. The town was named after George Tyler Wood, governor of Texas from 1847 to 1849.

== Geography ==
According to the United States Census Bureau, the town has a total area of 3.2 square miles (8.2 km^{2}), all land.

=== Climate ===
The climate in this area is characterized by hot, humid summers and generally mild to cool winters. According to the Köppen Climate Classification system, Woodville has a humid subtropical climate, abbreviated "Cfa" on climate maps.

== Demographics ==
Historical population
Census	Pop.	Note	%±
1890	518		—
1930	969		—
1940	1,521		57.0%
1950	1,863		22.5%
1960	1,920		3.1%
1970	2,662		38.6%
1980	2,821		6.0%
1990	2,636		−6.6%
2000	2,415		−8.4%
2010	2,586		7.1%
2020	2,403		−7.1%
U.S. Decennial Census

Woodville racial composition as of 2020 (NH = Non-Hispanic) (Note: Note: the US Census treats Hispanic/Latino as an ethnic category. This table excludes Latinos from the racial categories and assigns them to a separate category. Hispanics/Latinos can be of any race.)
Race	Number	Percentage
White (NH)	1,456	60.59%
Black or African American (NH)	652	27.13%
Native American or Alaska Native (NH)	15	0.62%
Asian (NH)	39	1.62%
Pacific Islander (NH)	2	0.08%
Some Other Race (NH)	5	0.21%
Mixed/Multi-Racial (NH)	84	3.5%
Hispanic or Latino	150	6.24%
Total	2,403	

As of the 2020 United States census, there were 2,403 people, 1,084 households, and 724 families residing in the town.

As of the census of 2000, there were 2,415 people, 990 households, and 591 families living in the town. The population density was 766.2 inhabitants per square mile (295.8/km^{2}). There were 1,264 housing units at an average density of 401.0 per square mile (154.8/km^{2}). The racial makeup of the town was 65.34% White, 31.80% African American, 0.25% Native American, 0.75% Asian, 0.08% Pacific Islander, 0.87% from other races, and 0.91% from two or more races. Hispanic or Latino of any race were 1.45% of the population.

There were 990 households, out of which 26.6% had children under the age of 18 living with them, 40.3% were married couples living together, 16.9% had a female householder with no husband present, and 40.3% were non-families. 37.9% of all households were made up of individuals, and 20.6% had someone living alone who was 65 years of age or older. The average household size was 2.25 and the average family size was 3.01.

In the town, the population was spread out, with 24.6% under the age of 18, 7.5% from 18 to 24, 21.3% from 25 to 44, 21.9% from 45 to 64, and 24.8% who were 65 years of age or older. The median age was 41 years. For every 100 females, there were 77.4 males. For every 100 females age 18 and over, there were 73.4 males.

The median income for a household in the town was $23,711, and the median income for a family was $31,000. Males had a median income of $30,515 versus $21,125 for females. The per capita income for the town was $14,686. About 19.7% of families and 23.5% of the population were below the poverty line, including 38.1% of those under age 18 and 13.2% of those age 65 or over.

== Education ==
The Woodville Independent School District (WISD) serves families from the community of Woodville Texas.

== Notable attractions ==
Notable attractions in the Woodville and surrounding area include:

- Allan Shivers Library and Museum features collections related to former Governor of Texas Allan Shivers who was from the area.
- Big Thicket National Preserve is to the south and west of town.
- Heritage Village, an open-air display of original, old buildings including a church, school, and a log cabin in set with others to help create a replica of an old frontier town.

== Notable people ==
- Brian Babin, former mayor of Woodville and Republican member of the United States House of Representatives for Texas's 36th congressional district since 2015
- Zelmo Beaty, born on October 25, 1939, in Hillister, Texas, attended Scott High School in Woodville. Beaty played collegiate basketball at Prairie View A&M.
- James White, Republican member of the Texas House of Representatives from District 19, including Tyler County
- Marcus Dion Gill, the main perpetrator of the 1995 Okinawa rape incident

== Photo gallery ==
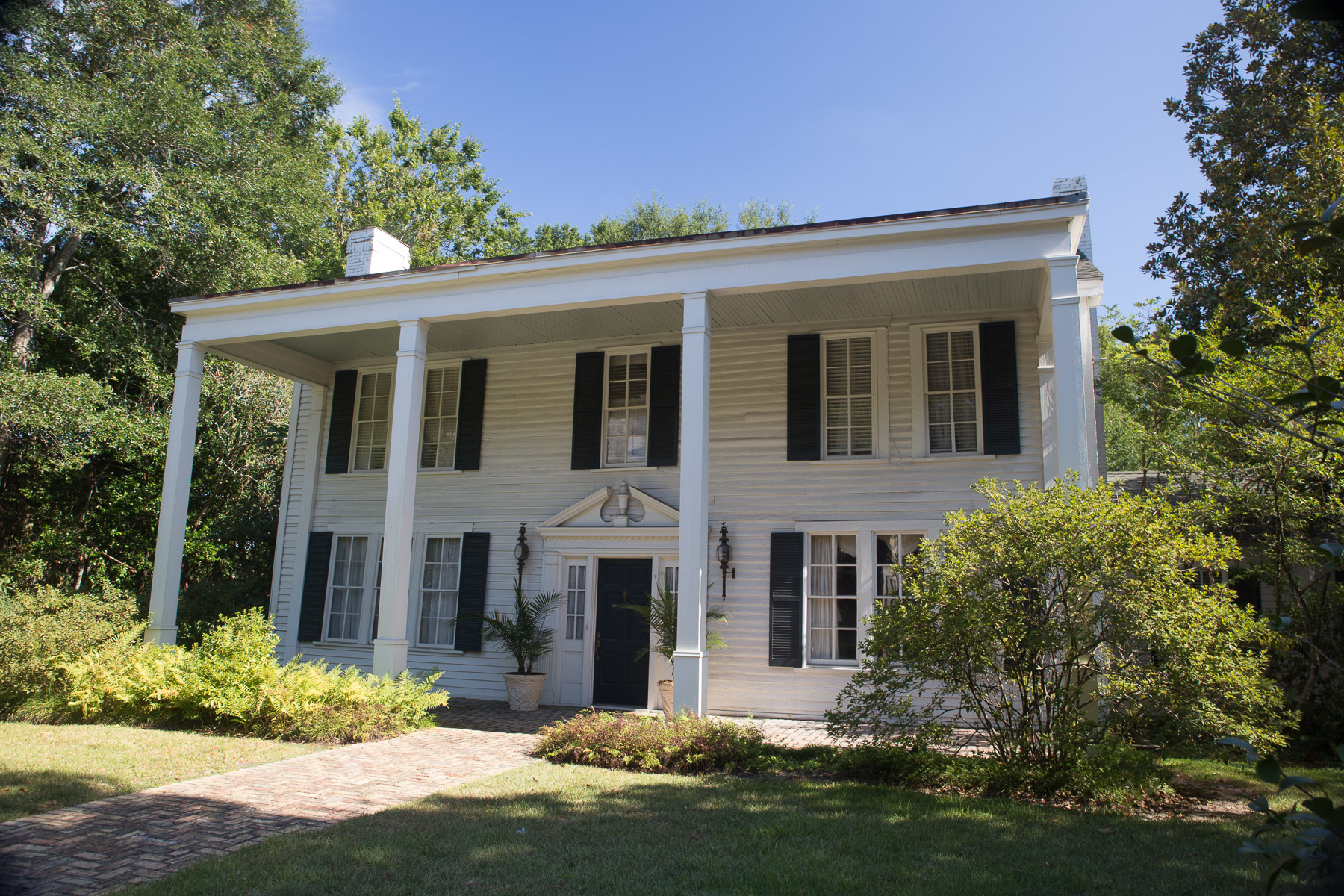
Wheat House

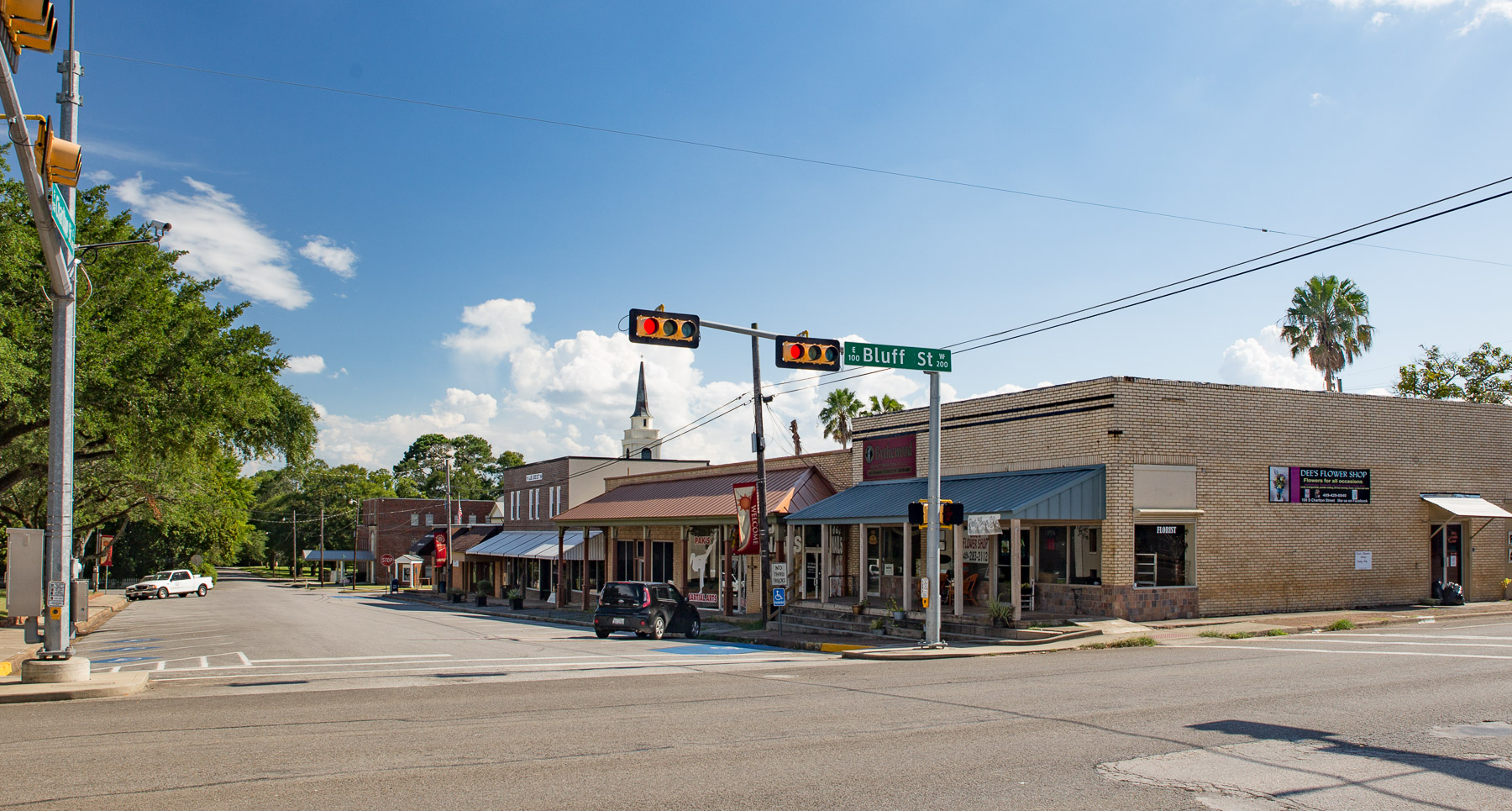
Downtown Woodville

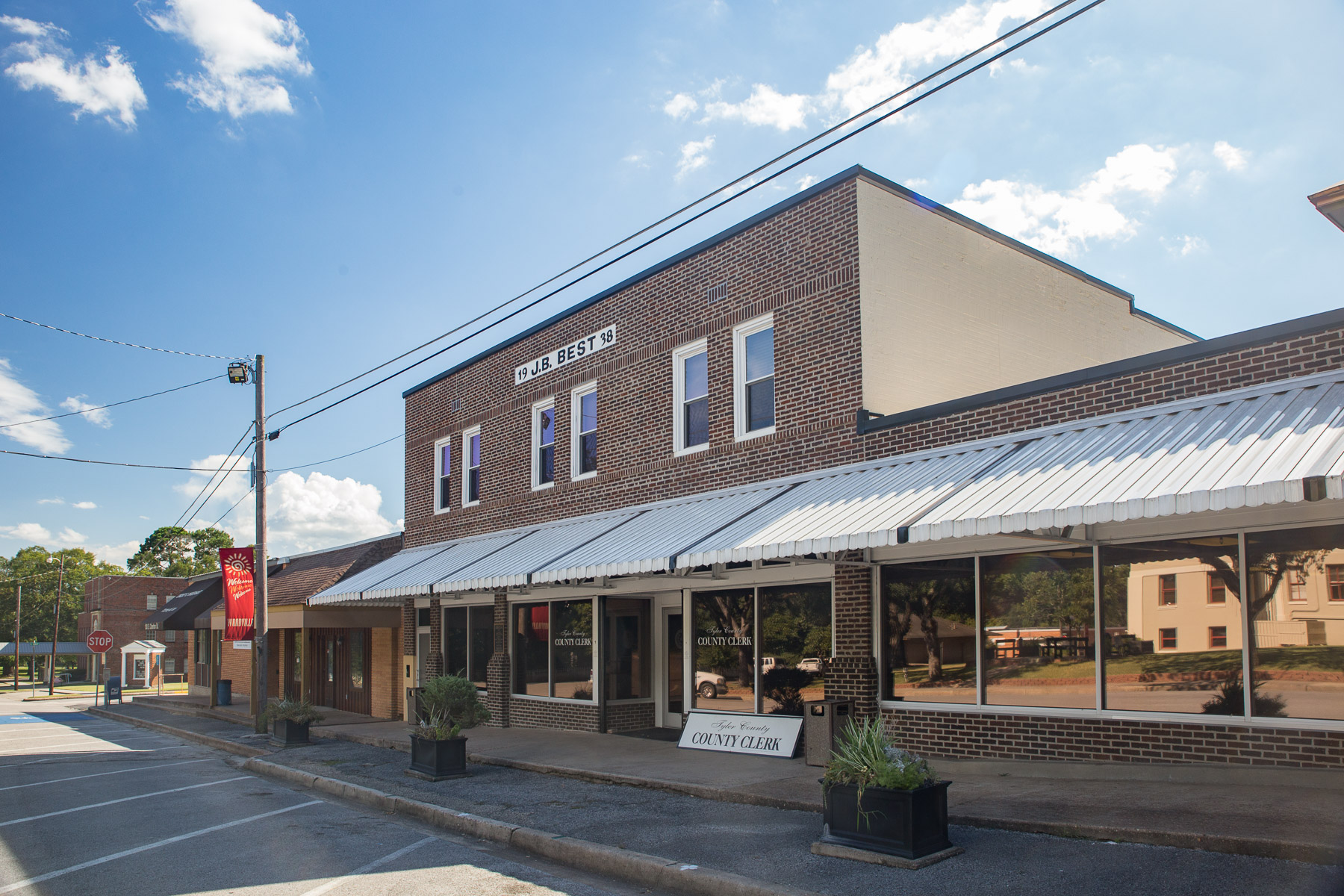
Best Building

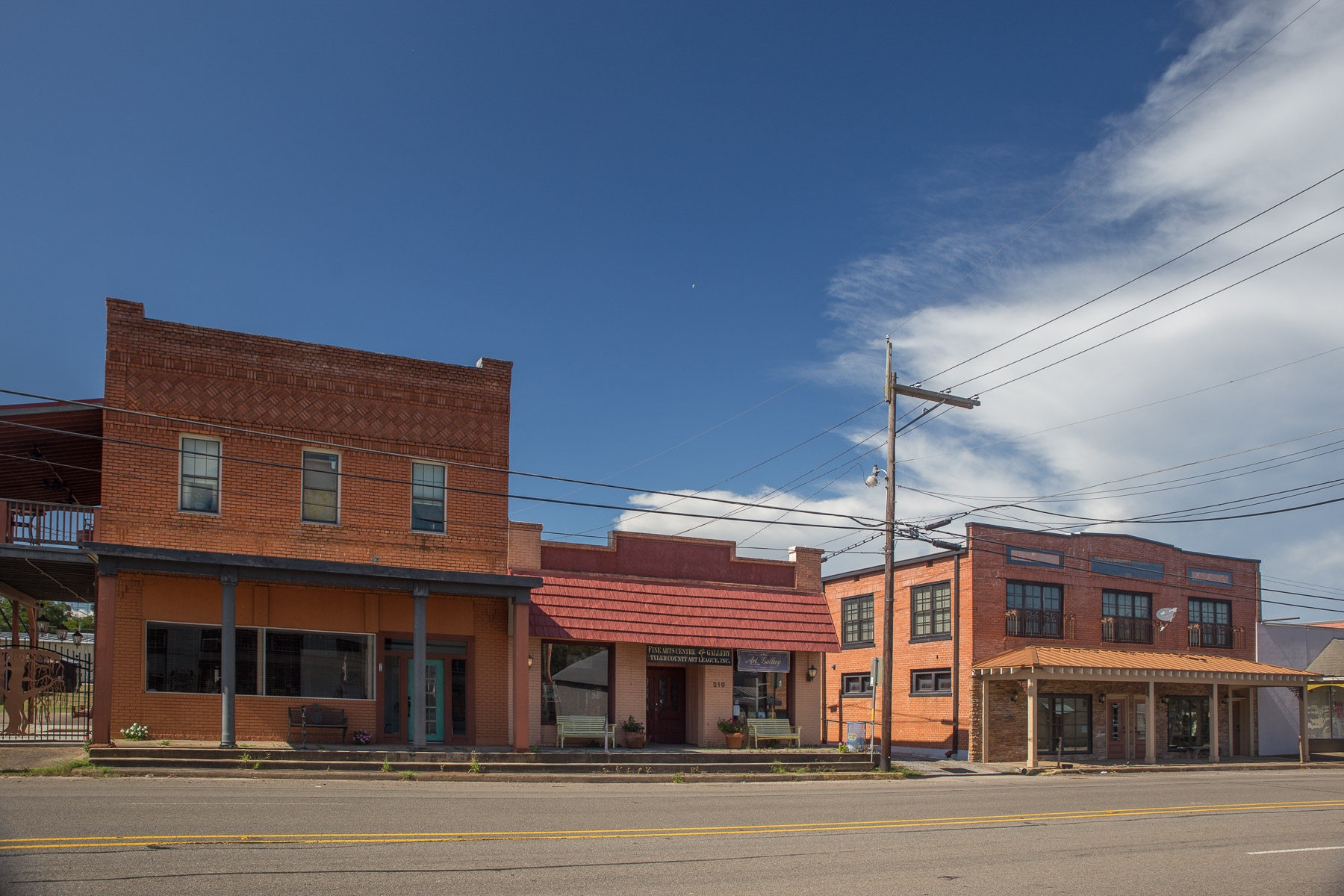
Downtown Woodville

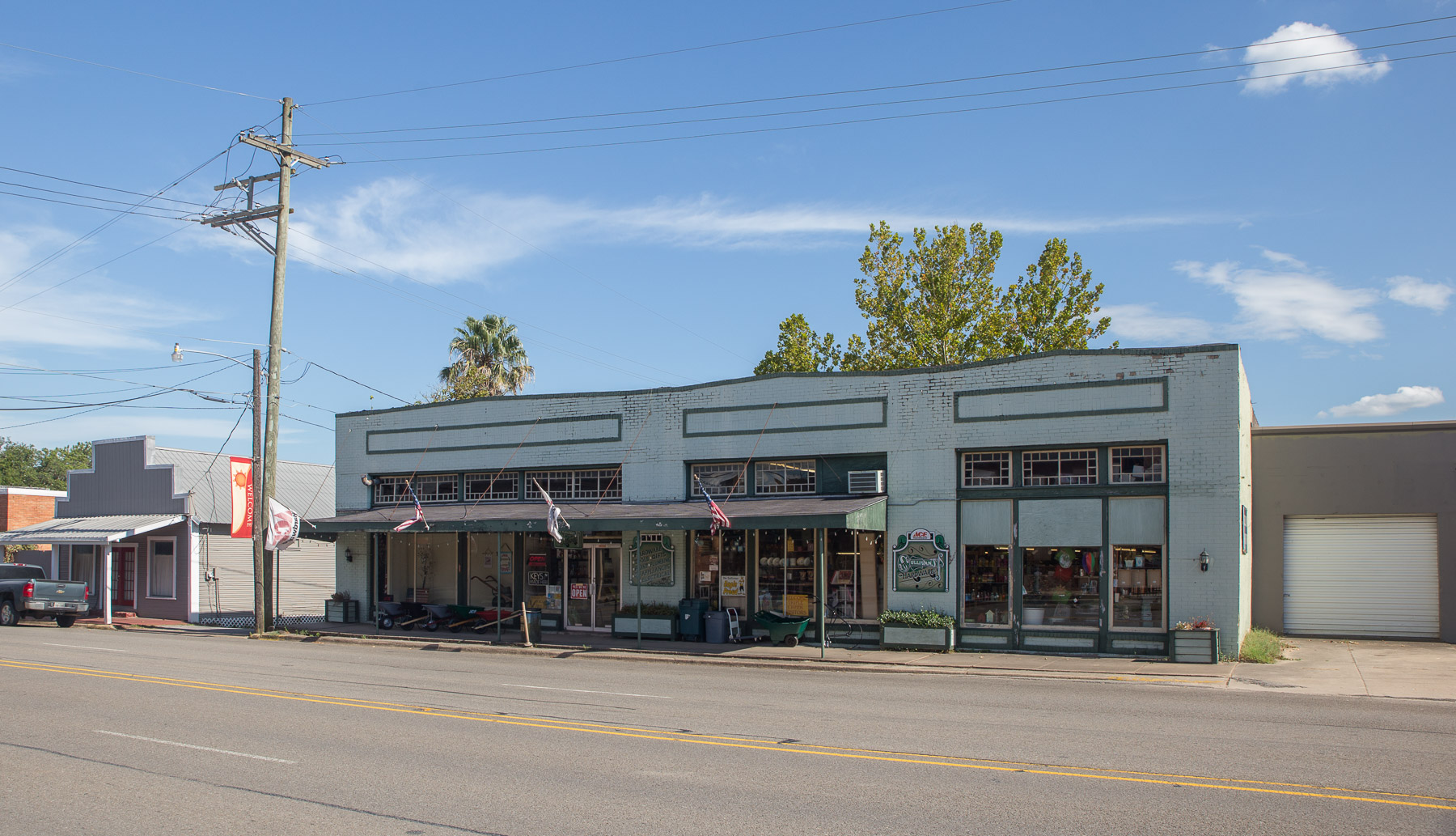
Downtown Woodville

== See also ==
- List of municipalities in Texas
