= Polk County, Texas =

County in Texas, United States

- County
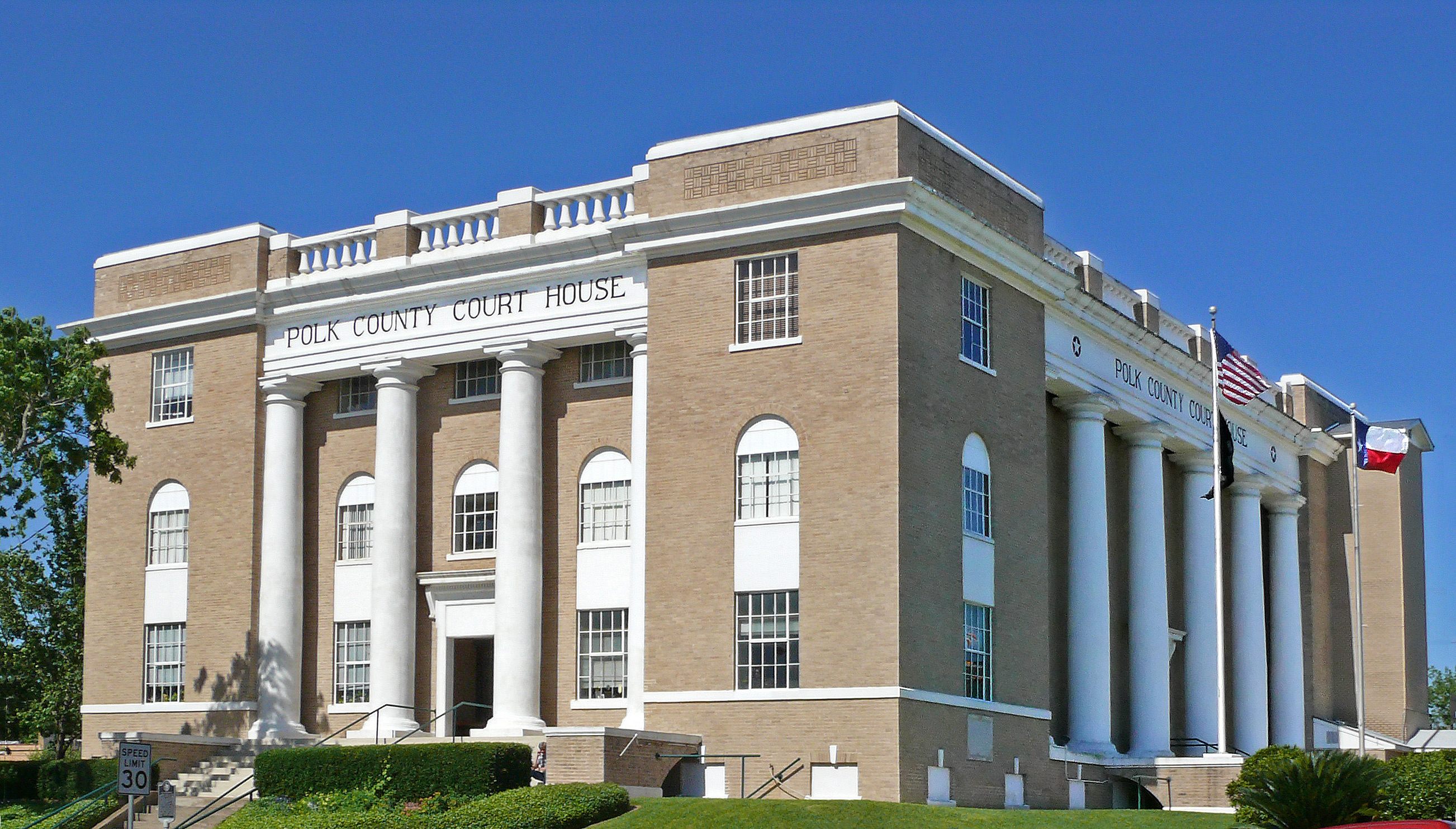
- Polk County Court House

- Location within the U.S. state of Texas
- Coordinates: 30°48′N 94°50′W
- Country: United States
- State: Texas
- Founded: March 30, 1846
- Named for: James K. Polk
- Seat: Livingston
- Largest town: Livingston

Area
  - Total: 1,110 sq mi (2,900 km^{2})
  - Land: 1,057 sq mi (2,740 km^{2})
  - Water: 53 sq mi (140 km^{2}) 4.74%

Population (2020)
  - Total: 50,123
  - Estimate (2025): 53,434 ▲
  - Density: 47.42/sq mi (18.31/km^{2})
- Time zone: UTC−6 (Central)
  - Summer (DST): UTC−5 (CDT)
- ZIP Codes: 75934, 75936, 75939, 75960, 77326, 77335, 77350, 77351, 77360, 77364
- Area code: 936
- Congressional district: 8th
- Website: www.polktx.gov

Polk County is a county located in the U.S. state of Texas. As of the 2020 census, its population was 50,123. Its county seat is Livingston. The county is named after President James K. Polk. The Alabama-Coushatta Indian Reservation of the federally recognized tribe is in Polk County, where the people have been since the early 19th century. They were forcibly evicted by the federal government from their traditional territory in the Southeast. The 2000 census reported a resident population of 480 persons on the reservation. The tribe reports 1,100 enrolled members. The Tribe also has a casino named Naskila.

== History ==
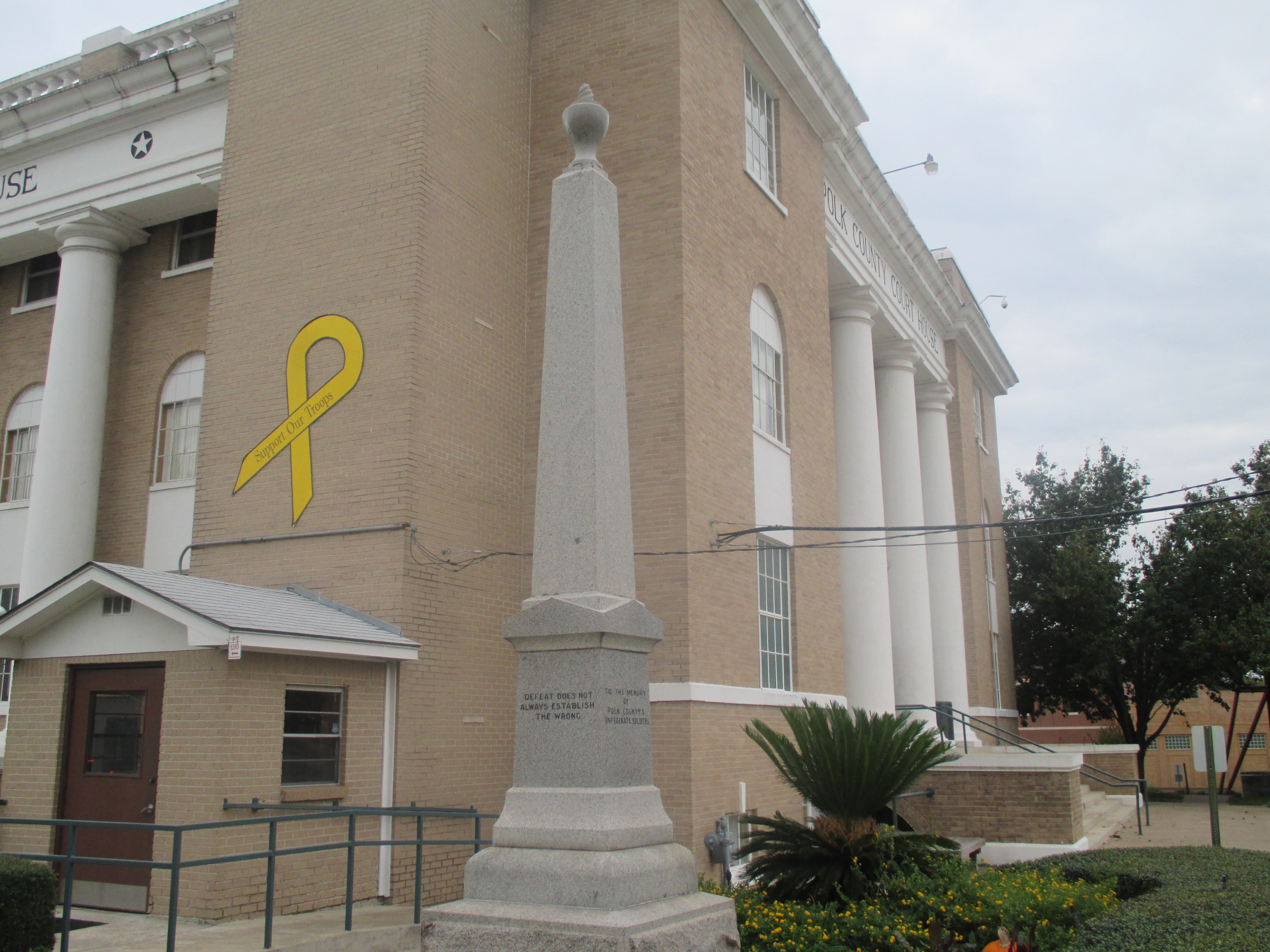
Ike Turner Camp Confederate Monument, Livingston, Texas

Polk County, named for James Knox Polk of Tennessee, President of the United States, was created by an act of the first Legislature of the State of Texas, approved on March 30, 1846, out of Liberty County, and embraced that portion from the part designated as the "Northern Division" of said county. It was one of the first of a series of 23 counties, formulated, constituted, and established by the State of Texas, after annexation to the United States.

== Demographics ==
Historical population
Census	Pop.	Note	%±
1850	2,348		—
1860	8,300		253.5%
1870	8,707		4.9%
1880	7,189		−17.4%
1890	10,332		43.7%
1900	14,447		39.8%
1910	17,459		20.8%
1920	16,784		−3.9%
1930	17,555		4.6%
1940	20,635		17.5%
1950	16,194		−21.5%
1960	13,861		−14.4%
1970	14,457		4.3%
1980	24,407		68.8%
1990	30,687		25.7%
2000	41,133		34.0%
2010	45,413		10.4%
2020	50,123		10.4%
2025 (est.)	53,434	▲	6.6%
U.S. Decennial Census; 1850–2010 2010 2020

=== Racial and ethnic composition ===
Polk County, Texas – Racial and ethnic composition Note: the US Census treats Hispanic/Latino as an ethnic category. This table excludes Latinos from the racial categories and assigns them to a separate category. Hispanics/Latinos may be of any race.
Race / Ethnicity (NH = Non-Hispanic)	Pop 1980	Pop 1990	Pop 2000	Pop 2010	Pop 2020	% 1980	% 1990	% 2000	% 2010	% 2020
White alone (NH)	19,070	24,531	30,723	32,830	34,808	78.13%	79.94%	74.69%	72.29%	69.45%
Black or African American alone (NH)	3,816	3,848	5,357	5,153	4,869	15.63%	12.54%	13.02%	11.35%	9.71%
Native American or Alaska Native alone (NH)	603	635	649	778	914	2.47%	2.07%	1.58%	1.71%	1.82%
Asian alone (NH)	10	55	156	180	340	0.04%	0.18%	0.38%	0.40%	0.68%
Native Hawaiian or Pacific Islander alone (NH)	x	x	3	7	0	x	x	0.01%	0.02%	0.00%
Other race alone (NH)	5	8	5	14	135	0.02%	0.03%	0.01%	0.03%	0.27%
Mixed race or Multiracial (NH)	x	x	379	492	1,712	x	x	0.92%	1.08%	3.42%
Hispanic or Latino (any race)	903	1,610	3,861	5,959	7,345	3.70%	5.25%	9.39%	13.12%	14.65%
Total	24,407	30,687	41,133	45,413	50,123	100.00%	100.00%	100.00%	100.00%	100.00%

=== 2020 census ===
As of the 2020 census, the county had a population of 50,123. The median age was 47.7 years. 18.9% of residents were under the age of 18 and 24.1% of residents were 65 years of age or older. For every 100 females there were 111.7 males, and for every 100 females age 18 and over there were 113.0 males age 18 and over.

The racial makeup of the county was 72.5% White, 9.8% Black or African American, 2.0% American Indian and Alaska Native, 0.7% Asian, <0.1% Native Hawaiian and Pacific Islander, 7.6% from some other race, and 7.3% from two or more races. Hispanic or Latino residents of any race comprised 14.7% of the population.

11.2% of residents lived in urban areas, while 88.8% lived in rural areas.

There were 18,969 households in the county, of which 24.8% had children under the age of 18 living in them. Of all households, 51.0% were married-couple households, 18.8% were households with a male householder and no spouse or partner present, and 24.5% were households with a female householder and no spouse or partner present. About 27.0% of all households were made up of individuals and 14.4% had someone living alone who was 65 years of age or older.

There were 24,622 housing units, of which 23.0% were vacant. Among occupied housing units, 77.0% were owner-occupied and 23.0% were renter-occupied. The homeowner vacancy rate was 2.5% and the rental vacancy rate was 10.8%.

=== 2000 census ===
As of the census of 2000, 41,133 people, 15,119 households, and 10,915 families were residing in the county. The population density was 39 inhabitants per square mile (15/km^{2}). The 21,177 housing units averaged 20 per square mile (7.7/km^{2}). The racial makeup of the county was 79.64% White, 13.17% African American, 1.74% Native American, 0.38% Asian, 3.75% from other races, and 1.32% from two or more races. About 9.39% of the population was Hispanic or Latino of any race.

Of the 15,119 households, 28.8% had children under 18 living with them, 57.9% were married couples living together, 10.8% had a female householder with no husband present, and 27.8% were not families. About 24.6% of all households were made up of individuals, and 12.5% had someone living alone who was 65 or older. The average household size was 2.50, and the average family size was 2.95.

In the county, the age distribution was 22.9% under 18, 8.10% from 18 to 24, 26.80% from 25 to 44, 24.20% from 45 to 64, and 18.00% who were 65 or older. The median age was 39 years. For every 100 females, there were 108.70 males. For every 100 females 18 and over, there were 109.50 males.

The median income for a household in the county was $30,495, and for a family was $35,957. Males had a median income of $30,823 versus $21,065 for females. The per capita income for the county was $15,834. About 13.3% of families and 17.40% of the population were below the poverty line, including 23.1% of those under age 18 and 12.3% of those 65 or over.

== Geography ==
According to the U.S. Census Bureau, the county has a total area of 1,110 sq mi (2,900 km^{2}), of which 53 sq mi (140 km^{2}) (4.7%) are covered by water.

=== Adjacent counties ===
- Angelina County (north)
- Tyler County (east)
- Hardin County (southeast)
- Liberty County (south)
- San Jacinto County (southwest)
- Trinity County (northwest)

=== National protected area ===
- Big Thicket National Preserve (part)

== Education ==
School districts:

- Big Sandy Independent School District
- Chester Independent School District
- Corrigan-Camden Independent School District
- Goodrich Independent School District
- Leggett Independent School District
- Livingston Independent School District
- Onalaska Independent School District
- Woodville Independent School District

The county is in the district for Angelina College. Polk County College / Commerce Center was completed in 2013 and is located on the U.S. Highway 59 Bypass. Angelina College offers advanced curriculum study and technical training at this location. The facility provides public auditorium space and may be used as a mass shelter in a disaster event.

== Government ==
Position	Name	Party
County Judge	Sydney Murphy	Republican
Commissioner, Precinct 1	Guylene Robertson	Republican
Commissioner, Precinct 2	Mark Dubose	Republican
Commissioner, Precinct 3	Milton Purvis	Republican
Commissioner, Precinct 4	Jerry Cassity	Republican

== Infrastructure ==
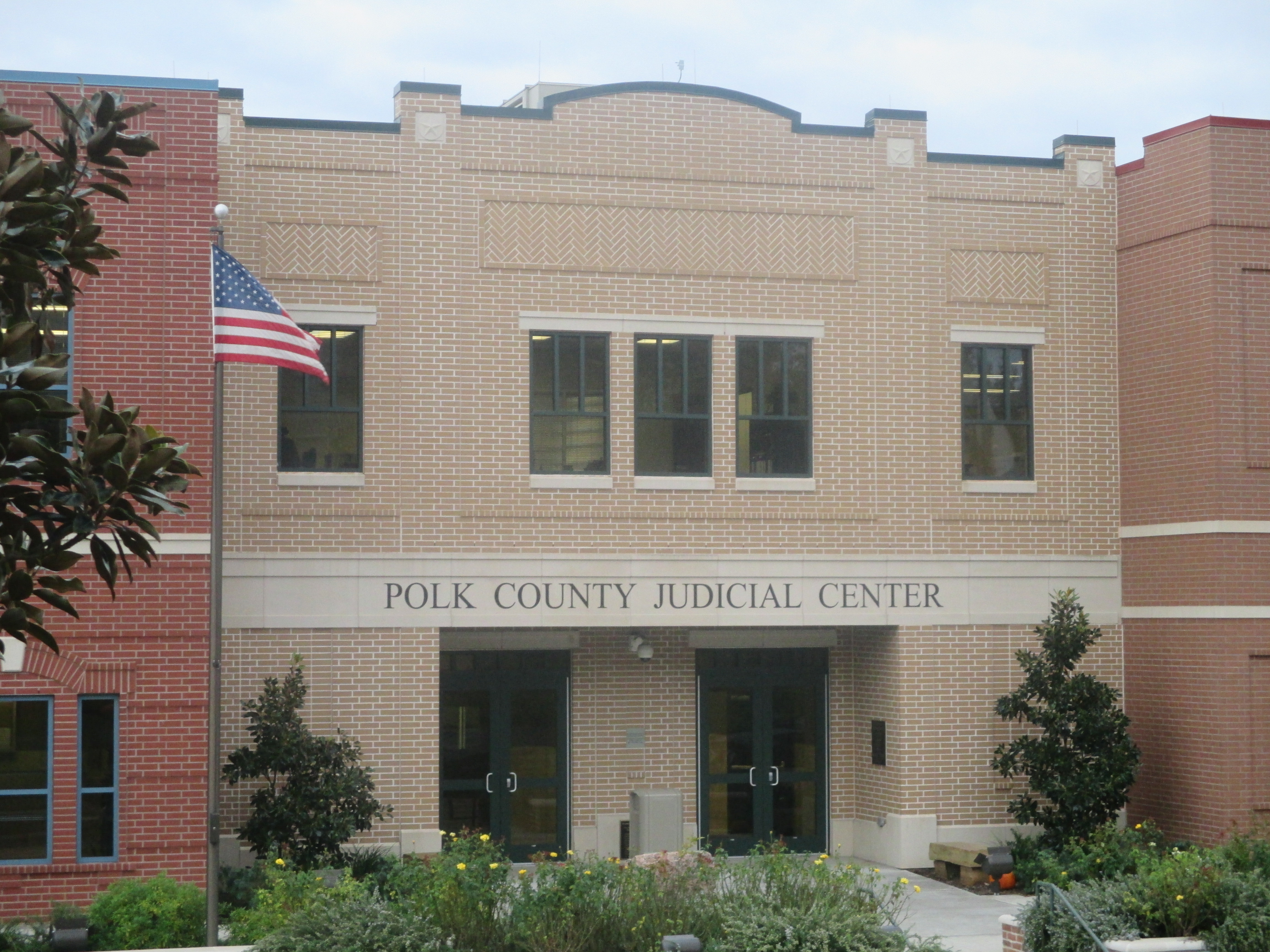
Polk County Judicial Center, Livingston, Texas

The Texas Department of Criminal Justice Allan B. Polunsky Unit is located in West Livingston. This has been the location of the Texas men's death row since 1999.

== Transportation ==
=== Major highways ===
- U.S. Highway 59
  - Interstate 69 is currently under construction and will eventually follow the current route of U.S. 59 throughout most of Polk County.
- U.S. Highway 190
- U.S. Highway 287
- State Highway 146
- Loop 116
- Loop 177
- Loop 393
- Farm to Market Road 350
- Farm to Market Road 356
- Farm to Market Road 357
- Farm to Market Road 942
- Farm to Market Road 943
- Farm to Market Road 1745

=== Mass transportation ===
Greyhound Lines operates the Livingston Station at the Super Stop Food Mart in Livingston.

=== Airport ===
West Livingston has the Livingston Municipal Airport, operated by the City of Livingston.

== Communities ==
=== Cities ===
- Goodrich
- Onalaska
- Seven Oaks

=== Towns ===
- Corrigan
- Livingston (county seat)

=== Census-designated places ===
- Big Thicket Lake Estates (partly in Liberty County)
- Cedar Point
- Indian Springs
- Pleasant Hill
- West Livingston

=== Unincorporated communities ===
- Ace
- Asia
- Barnum
- Blanchard
- Camden
- Dallardsville
- East Tempe
- Israel
- Leggett
- Moscow

=== Ghost town ===
- Laurelia

== Notable people ==
- Percy Foreman - notable criminal defense attorney
- John Wesley Hardin - Old West gunslinger
- William P. Hobby - Governor of Texas, publisher of Houston Post
- Sam Houston, general of the revolution to achieve independence and President of the Republic of Texas, spent much time in Polk County, including making peace treaties with the Alabama-Coushata Indians.
- Margo Jones - stage director who launched the careers of Tennessee Williams and Ray Walston and directed Williams' The Glass Menagerie on Broadway
- René-Robert Cavelier, Sieur de La Salle, noted French explorer of the 17th century, was likely killed in Polk County.
- Sally Mayes was a Broadway actress and singer. Livingston named a street in her honor.
- Mark Moseley, professional football player, won Super Bowl XVII and was awarded 1982 MVP as a placekicker.
- Moon Mullican - musician, "King of the Hillbilly Piano Players"
- Captain (Ike) Isaac Newton Moreland Turner was a Confederate captain who joined the Civil War from Polk County, with units called the Texas Brigade; his remains were returned here from Georgia and were reinterred in his family cemetery on April 15, 1995.
- Annette Gordon-Reed (born November 19, 1958, in Livingston, Texas) is an American historian, Pulitzer Prize-winning author, and law professor noted for changing scholarship on Thomas Jefferson regarding his relationship with Sally Hemings and her children.

== Politics ==
=== United States Congress ===
Senators	Name	Party	First Elected	Level
Senate Class 1	John Cornyn	Republican	1993	Senior Senator
Senate Class 2	Ted Cruz	Republican	2012	Junior Senator
Representatives	Name	Party	First Elected	Area(s) of Polk County Represented
District 8	Morgan Luttrell	Republican	2022	Entire county

United States presidential election results for Polk County, Texas
Year	Republican		Democratic		Third party(ies)	
Year	No.	%	No.	%	No.	%
1912	41	5.26%	615	78.85%	124	15.90%
1916	107	9.39%	918	80.60%	114	10.01%
1920	255	19.84%	810	63.04%	220	17.12%
1924	272	12.70%	1,839	85.85%	31	1.45%
1928	508	33.73%	994	66.00%	4	0.27%
1932	110	4.93%	2,117	94.98%	2	0.09%
1936	141	8.01%	1,618	91.93%	1	0.06%
1940	280	9.58%	2,642	90.42%	0	0.00%
1944	154	6.83%	1,817	80.61%	283	12.56%
1948	317	13.96%	1,422	62.64%	531	23.39%
1952	1,454	39.36%	2,238	60.58%	2	0.05%
1956	1,663	52.89%	1,465	46.60%	16	0.51%
1960	1,268	37.74%	2,037	60.63%	55	1.64%
1964	1,199	32.41%	2,492	67.35%	9	0.24%
1968	1,013	22.18%	1,841	40.31%	1,713	37.51%
1972	3,048	63.13%	1,760	36.45%	20	0.41%
1976	2,529	36.30%	4,384	62.93%	54	0.78%
1980	3,771	46.51%	4,213	51.96%	124	1.53%
1984	5,987	60.36%	3,898	39.30%	33	0.33%
1988	5,831	48.88%	5,943	49.82%	155	1.30%
1992	5,390	37.81%	5,942	41.69%	2,922	20.50%
1996	6,473	45.44%	6,360	44.65%	1,411	9.91%
2000	11,746	61.84%	6,877	36.21%	371	1.95%
2004	13,778	66.09%	6,964	33.41%	104	0.50%
2008	13,731	68.15%	6,230	30.92%	188	0.93%
2012	14,071	73.54%	4,859	25.39%	204	1.07%
2016	15,176	76.45%	4,187	21.09%	489	2.46%
2020	18,573	76.79%	5,387	22.27%	226	0.93%
2024	19,216	79.10%	4,910	20.21%	166	0.68%

United States Senate election results for Polk County, Texas1
Year	Republican		Democratic		Third party(ies)	
Year	No.	%	No.	%	No.	%
2024	18,596	77.02%	5,106	21.15%	441	1.83%

United States Senate election results for Polk County, Texas2
Year	Republican		Democratic		Third party(ies)	
Year	No.	%	No.	%	No.	%
2020	17,735	75.37%	5,237	22.26%	559	2.38%

Texas Gubernatorial election results for Polk County
Year	Republican		Democratic		Third party(ies)	
Year	No.	%	No.	%	No.	%
2022	13,377	79.74%	3,229	19.25%	170	1.01%

== See also ==
- List of counties in Texas
- National Register of Historic Places listings in Polk County, Texas
- Recorded Texas Historic Landmarks in Polk County
