= Camden, Texas =

Camden
- Unincorporated area
- Location within the state of Texas Camden (the United States)
- Coordinates: 30°55′02″N 94°44′04″W
- Country: United States
- State: Texas
- County: Polk
- Elevation: 295 ft (90 m)

Population (2000)
  - Total: 1,200
- Time zone: UTC-6 (Central (CST))
  - Summer (DST): UTC-5 (CDT)
- GNIS feature ID: 1353595

Camden is an unincorporated community in east central Polk County, Texas, United States. It is located at the junction of Farm to Market Roads 942 and 62, eighty miles north-northwest of Beaumont. As of the year 2000, the community had approximately 1,200 residents.

The Corrigan-Camden Independent School District serves area students.

== History ==
Camden was a company town begun by the W. T. Carter & Brother lumber company in the early 1900s. Virtually all the housing was built by the company and was rented by the company to its employees. After the sale of the company to Champion Paper in the late 1960s, all the public buildings and housing except those owned by Carter Heirs were sold and moved. At the time of sale it was one of the last company towns in Texas. The Camden School District was merged into the Corrigan School District with a new name of Corrigan-Camden School District. By the early 1970s all that was left was a post office, Champion company offices and a few vacation homes owned by Carters.

There is a theory that some early Carters were familiar with Camden, Maine, and that is the origin of the name of this Camden.

== Transportation ==
The Moscow, Camden and San Augustine Railroad serves the Champion wood products plant, connecting with the Union Pacific at Moscow. Passenger service to Moscow was discontinued in 1973.
