= Big Sandy High School (Dallardsville, Texas) =

Coordinates: 30.6278°N 94.6326°W

Location
- 9180 FM 1276; Dallardsville, Texas 77332-0188; United States

Information
- School type: Public high school
- School district: Big Sandy Independent School District
- Principal: Stephanie Hendrix
- Staff: 41.84 (FTE)
- Grades: PK-12
- Enrollment: 524 (2023–2024)
- Student to teacher ratio: 12.52
- Colors: Purple & White
- Athletics conference: UIL Class AA
- Mascot: Wildcat
- Website: Big Sandy High School

Big Sandy High School or Big Sandy School is a public high school located in Dallardsville, Texas and classified as a 2A school by the UIL. It is a part of the Big Sandy Independent School District in Polk County, Texas. In 2015, the school was rated "Met Standard" by the Texas Education Agency.

== Athletics ==
The Big Sandy Wildcats compete in these sports -

Cross Country, Basketball, Track, Softball & Baseball

=== State Titles ===
- Boys Basketball -
  - 1952(B), 1957(B)

Baseball- 2018(2A) 2019(2A)

==== State Finalists ====
- Boys Basketball -
  - 1949(B), 1951(B), 1953(B), 1954(B), 1955(B), 1958(B), 1988(1A), 2008(1A), 2015(2A)
- Softball -
  - 2005(1A)
