= Blanchard, Texas =

Blanchard
- Unincorporated area
- Location within the state of Texas Blanchard (the United States)
- Coordinates: 30°44′13″N 95°03′20″W
- Country: United States
- State: Texas
- County: Polk
- Elevation: 148 ft (45 m)

Population (2000)
  - Total: 200
- Time zone: UTC-6 (Central (CST))
  - Summer (DST): UTC-5 (CDT)

Blanchard is an unincorporated community located at the junction of Farm Roads 3126 and 2457, about 82 miles north of Houston in Polk County, Texas, United States.

In the early 1900s, a railroad stop established in the area was named Blanchard by William Carlisle, owner of the sawmill at nearby Onalaska, after his brother-in-law, Ben Blanchard, of New York.

In 1949, the rail line, which had been operated by the Waco, Beaumont, Trinity & Sabine Railway Co. since 1923, was abandoned.

When Lake Livingston was constructed in 1968, a series of roads and parks was developed in the area. Blanchard's population was estimated at 50 in the mid-1920s, mid-1980s, and early 1990s. In 2000, the population was listed as 200.

== Education ==
Blanchard is served by the Livingston and Onalaska Independent School Districts.
