= Corrigan-Camden High School =

Public school in Texas, United States

Location
- 504 S Home Street; Corrigan, Texas 75939; United States; 30.9916°N 94.8258°W

Information
- Type: Public high school
- School district: Corrigan-Camden Independent School District
- NCES School ID: 481530001098
- Principal: Melissa Rabano
- Teaching staff: 29.39 (on an FTE basis)
- Grades: 9–12
- Enrollment: 252 (2023-2024)
- Student to teacher ratio: 8.57
- Colors: Blue and white
- Athletics conference: UIL Class 3A
- Mascot: Bulldog
- Website: www.ccisdtx.com

Corrigan-Camden High School is a public high school in Corrigan, Texas, United States. It is part of the Corrigan-Camden Independent School District.

In addition to Corrigan, the district serves the census-designated place of Pleasant Hill, and a section of the city of Seven Oaks.

== History ==
In 2011, the school was nominated by the Texas Education Agency to be a blue-ribbon school based on their improvements in math over the past five years. On June 7, 2016, the agriculture building at the school caught on fire, which started when a construction crew was working on the building. There were no students and staff inside the building, and everyone inside the other buildings were evacuated. No injuries were reported and the cause of the fire was unknown.

== Athletics ==
The school mascot is the bulldog, and is classified as a 3A school by the University Interscholastic League (UIL). Athletic programs offered by the school include:

- Football
- Girls' basketball
- Softball
- Track
- Cheerleading
- Volleyball
- Cross country

== Notable alumni ==
- Chase Ford, former NFL player
- LaDarius Hamilton, NFL player
- Ray Woodard, former NFL player
