= Ace, Texas =

Ace
- Unincorporated area
- Location within the state of Texas Ace (the United States)
- Coordinates: 30°32′11″N 94°49′28″W
- Country: United States
- State: Texas
- County: Polk
- Elevation: 174 ft (53 m)

Population (2020)
  - Total: 137
- Time zone: UTC-6 (Central (CST))
  - Summer (DST): UTC-5 (CDT)
- Postal code: 77326
- GNIS feature ID: 1379311

Ace is an unincorporated community in south-central Polk County, Texas, located along Farm Road 2610, approximately 75 miles northeast of Houston. Its postal code is 77326 and is served by the (936) telephone area code.

== History ==
The area now known as Ace has roots dating back to 1830, when Samuel C. Hiroms established a settlement called Smithfield about a mile south of the present-day site. Originally referred to as Smith's Field—named after early settler Robert Smith—the location served as a stopping point along the Liberty-Nacogdoches road and was home to a nearby group of Coushatta Indians. The 1834 census recorded only seven families in the Trinity River settlement of Smithfield.

By 1840, the settlement had moved to its current location and became a steamboat landing along the Trinity River. Several sawmills were established, and a post office operated as early as 1840. However, as other riverports gained prominence, Ace remained a small community. The post office was discontinued in 1871 but was reopened in 1915 and named Ace, after postmaster Ace Emanuel.

Oil discoveries in 1952 and again in 1969 brought brief periods of economic activity. The population, estimated at 25 in the mid-1940s, rose to 40 by the early 1970s and held steady through 2000. According to the 2020 Census, Ace had a population of 137 residents and 102 households.

== Surrounding Subdivisions ==
Though Ace itself is small, the surrounding area includes several subdivisions that contribute to its residential base. These are not officially designated by the U.S. Census Bureau, but population estimates can be derived from utility and county data:

- Taylor Lake Estates is a lakeside subdivision southeast of Ace. Development began in the mid-1960s, with public promotion of waterfront lots by 1969. It remains an active residential area.
- Wild Country Lake Estates, located south of Ace between U.S. Highway 146 and FM 2610, was developed in the late 1970s. Known for its streets named after country musicians, the area is gradually growing.

=== Wild Country Lake Estates Dam and Bridge History ===
In 2008, Hurricane Ike severely damaged the dam in the Wild Country Lake Estates subdivision in Ace, Texas. Built in the late 1980s, the dam created a lake and served as a vital roadway linking both sides of the community. The storm left a major breach, cutting off access and adding an eight-mile detour between entrances on U.S. Highway 146 and FM 2610—impacting emergency response times.

Precinct 1 Commissioner Bob Willis led efforts to secure FEMA and state support for repairs, but funding delays, erosion, and a clogged spillway stalled progress. The dam ultimately failed on February 18, 2010.

With support from the Property Owners Association, Willis pursued construction of a permanent bridge. A government grant was eventually secured, and Longview Bridge & Road, Ltd. completed the project. The new bridge opened on April 18, 2015, restoring direct access and improving emergency services.

The loss of roadway access following the Wild Country Lake Estates dam failure was not unprecedented in the area. During Hurricane Bonnie in 1986, a section of earthen dam at nearby Big Thicket Lake Estates washed out, draining the lake and severing the roadway across the dam. Approximately 300 residents were stranded by the failure.

== Geography & Environment ==
Ace lies just north of the Big Thicket National Preserve, a federally protected ecological region renowned for its biodiversity. Spanning over 113,000 acres, the preserve offers opportunities for hiking, kayaking, and nature observation. Just south of Ace, Birdwatchers Trail follows Menard Creek and leads to scenic views of the Trinity River. This proximity to the Big Thicket underscores Ace’s connection to one of Texas’s most ecologically diverse environments.

== Weather events ==
Notable weather events that have affected Ace include:

- 1980 United States heat Wave - Severe drought affected Polk County agriculture.
- Hurricane Bonnie (1986) - Ace received 13 in of rainfall, causing flooding that affected homes and roads.
- 1988-1990 North American Drought - Heat and lack of rainfall impacted timber production, agriculture, and cattle production.
- Christmas Freeze of 1989 - Extreme cold & prolonged freezing temperatures threatening vegetation and livestock.
- 1995-1996 Agricultural Drought - Prolonged drought affecting agriculture and water supplies.
- Tropical Storm Frances (1998) - Heavy rainfall from the slow-moving tropical strom, providing relief from severe summer drought.
- 1999-2002 Dry Period and Drought - Recurring drought and dry conditions affected Polk County.
- Tropical Storm Allison (2001) - Heavy rainfall and flooding affected Polk County as Allison moved across East Texas.
- Hurricane Rita (2005) - Strong winds caused widespread tree and power-line damage across Polk County.
- 2005-2006 Drought - Persistent dry conditions affected East Texas, increasing agricultural and wildfire concerns.
- Hurricane Ike (2008) - Ike produced strong winds, widespread tree and power-line damage, and structural damage in Polk County.
- 2010-2013 Southern United States Drought - A prolonged statewide drought brought periods of severe dryness and extreme heat.
- Hurricane Harvey (2017) - Prolonged heavy rainfall produced significant flooding across Polk County and Trinity River areas.
- Tropical Storm Imelda (2019) - Heavy rainfall associated with Imelda, with the most severe flooding occurring south Polk County.
- 2020-2025 Drought - Drought included periods of intensification and partial recovery creating elevated wildfire danger.
- The Great Texas Freeze (2021) - Extreme cold and ice affected Polk County, causing power outages and broken water pipes.
- May 2024 Floods - Heavy rains caused flooding across Polk County, Lake Livingston record release at Dam (124,260 cu ft/s).
- Hurricane Beryl (2024) - Beryl brought strong winds, downed trees and widespread power outages.
- 2025-2026 Winter Drought- Persistent below-normal rainfall contributed to worsening drought conditions.
- Tropical Storm Edouard (2026) - Edouard brought heavy rainfall, alleviating the summer drought in Ace.

== Emergency Services ==
Ace is served by the South Polk County Volunteer Fire Department, which provides fire protection and emergency services to the community of Ace and neighboring areas.

== Education ==
Public education for Ace residents is provided by the Livingston Independent School District.
