= LaDarius Hamilton =

American gridiron football player (born 1998)

La'Darius Hamilton
Profile
- Position: Defensive end

Personal information
- Born: January 18, 1998 (age 28); Corrigan, Texas, U.S.
- Listed height: 6 ft 2 in (1.88 m)
- Listed weight: 261 lb (118 kg)

Career information
- High school: Corrigan-Camden (Corrigan, Texas)
- College: North Texas (2016–2019)
- NFL draft: 2020: undrafted

Career history
- Dallas Cowboys (2020)*; Tampa Bay Buccaneers (2021)*; Green Bay Packers (2021–2022); San Francisco 49ers (2023)*; Toronto Argonauts (2024)*
- * Offseason or practice squad member only

Awards and highlights
- All-C-USA (2018); C-USA All-Freshman team (2016)

Career NFL statistics
- Total tackles: 4
- Stats at Pro Football Reference
- Stats at CFL.ca

La'Darius Hamilton (born January 18, 1998) is an American professional football defensive end. He played college football at North Texas, and originally signed with the Dallas Cowboys as an undrafted free agent in 2020. He has also been a member of the Tampa Bay Buccaneers, Green Bay Packers, San Francisco 49ers, and Toronto Argonauts.

== Early life ==
Hamilton attended Corrigan-Camden High School, where he played up to six positions on the football team (offensive tackle, defensive end, linebacker, tight end, long snapper and at times, placekicker).

As a sophomore, he received District 12-2A-DII defensive newcomer of the year honors. He was named first-team All-district as a junior and senior.

As a senior, he tallied 83 tackles, three forced fumbles and two fumble recoveries, while contributing to the team reaching the quarterfinal round of the Texas Class 3A Division II playoffs.

== College career ==
Hamilton accepted a football scholarship from North Texas University. Hamilton was a three-star recruit coming into North Texas, and in his first year was featured on the Conference USA All-Freshman team. He appeared in all 13 games, collecting nine tackles (three for loss) and one sack.

As a sophomore, he appeared in 14 games with 8 starts, posting 40 tackles (four for loss), one interception, one fumble recovery and five quarterback hurries.

As a junior, he appeared in 13 games with 11 starts, registering 33 tackles (11 for loss), 7.5 sacks and three quarterback hurries. In a game against Louisiana Tech, he wore Mean Joe Greene's retired number 75 on his jersey, during the week when the school unveiled a statue to honor Greene. He had three tackles, two sacks, and one quarterback hurry against the University of Arkansas.

As a senior, he appeared in 12 games, totaling 39 tackles (10.5 for loss), 8.5 sacks (led the team) and one forced fumble. He had six tackles (2.5 for loss), two sacks and three quarterback hurries against Southern Methodist University. He finished tied for sixth place in North Texas career sacks (17.0) and tackles for loss (28.5).

== Professional career ==
Pre-draft measurables
Height	Weight	Arm length	Hand span	40-yard dash	10-yard split	20-yard split	20-yard shuttle	Three-cone drill	Vertical jump	Broad jump	Bench press
6 ft 2 in (1.88 m)	262 lb (119 kg)	32 1/8 in (0.82 m)	9 1/4 in (0.23 m)	4.89 s	1.74 s	2.85 s	4.49 s	7.66 s	30.0 in (0.76 m)	9 ft 6 in (2.90 m)	27 reps
All values from NFL Combine

=== Dallas Cowboys ===
Hamilton was signed as an undrafted free agent by the Dallas Cowboys after the 2020 NFL draft on April 26. As a rookie, he spent the entire year on the Cowboys' practice squad. He was waived after the 2021 NFL draft on May 5, 2021.

=== Tampa Bay Buccaneers ===
On May 6, 2021, Hamilton was claimed off of waivers by the Tampa Bay Buccaneers. On August 31, he was released before the start of the season and signed to the practice squad on September 2, 2021.

=== Green Bay Packers ===
==== 2021 season ====
Hamilton was signed off the Buccaneers' practice squad by the Green Bay Packers on September 17, 2021, to fill the roster spot that was opened with Za'Darius Smith being put on short-term injured reserve. He was waived on November 13, and re-signed to the practice squad three days later.

He was elevated to the active roster on November 20 ahead of a Week 11 game against the Minnesota Vikings. He was elevated to the active roster again on November 27 ahead of a Week 12 game against the Los Angeles Rams. He was elevated to the active roster the third time on January 8, 2022, ahead of a Week 18 game against the Detroit Lions.

==== 2022 season ====
On January 25, 2022, he signed a reserve/future contract with the Packers. He was waived on August 30, and signed to the practice squad the next day.

On October 22, 2022, Hamilton was elevated to the active roster for the week 7 game against the Washington Commanders and once again three weeks later against the Dallas Cowboys. On November 17, 2022, Hamilton was elevated to the active roster for the week 11 game against the Tennessee Titans.

==== 2023 season ====
Hamilton signed a reserve/future contract on January 10, 2023. He was released on August 1, 2023.

=== San Francisco 49ers ===
On August 19, 2023, Hamilton signed with the San Francisco 49ers. He was waived on August 27, 2023.

=== Toronto Argonauts ===
On February 14, 2024, it was announced that Hamilton had signed with the Toronto Argonauts. However, he was part of the final training camp cuts on June 1, 2024.

== NFL career statistics ==
=== Regular season ===
Year	Team	GP	GS	Tackles					Interceptions						Fumbles	
Year	Team	GP	GS	Total	Solo	Ast	Sck	SFTY	PDef	Int	Yds	Avg	Lng	TDs	FF	FR
2021	GB	6	0	3	2	1	0	0	0	0	0	0	0	0	0	0
2022	GB	3	0	1	0	1	0	0	0	0	0	0	0	0	0	0
Total		9	0	4	2	2	0	0	0	0	0	0	0	0	0	0
Source: pro-football-reference.com
