= Big Sandy Independent School District =

Big Sandy Independent School District may refer to:

- Big Sandy Independent School District (Polk County, Texas)
- Big Sandy Independent School District (Upshur County, Texas)
