= MCSA =

MCSA may refer to:

- The Mountain Club of South Africa
- Moscow, Camden and San Augustine Railroad
- Monte Carlo Statistical Analysis - CEO: Mizuno, E.Y.
- MC Sailing Association
- Methodist Church of Southern Africa
- Motor Current Signature Analysis
- Microsoft Certified Systems Administrator, or Microsoft Certified Solutions Associate, retired components of the Microsoft Certified Professional Program
