= Chase Ford =

American football player (born 1990)

No. 86
- Position: Tight end

Personal information
- Born: July 19, 1990 (age 36); Corrigan, Texas, U.S.
- Listed height: 6 ft 6 in (1.98 m)
- Listed weight: 255 lb (116 kg)

Career information
- High school: Corrigan-Camden (TX)
- College: Kilgore College (2008-09); Miami (FL)
- NFL draft: 2012: undrafted

Career history
- Philadelphia Eagles (2012)*; Dallas Cowboys (2012)*; Minnesota Vikings (2012–2015); Baltimore Ravens (2015); Cleveland Browns (2016)*
- * Offseason or practice squad member only

Career NFL statistics
- Receptions: 34
- Receiving yards: 391
- Receiving touchdowns: 1
- Stats at Pro Football Reference

Chase Ford (born July 19, 1990) is an American former professional football player who was a tight end in the National Football League (NFL). He was signed by the Philadelphia Eagles as an undrafted free agent in 2012, and was also a member of the Minnesota Vikings, Baltimore Ravens and Cleveland Browns. He played college football at Kilgore College from 2008 to 2009, before transferring to the Miami Hurricanes.

== Early life ==
Ford attended Corrigan-Camden High School in Corrigan, Texas, where he was a letterman in football, basketball and track. In football, he played as a tight end, and earned All-District honors as a senior. In basketball, he was named to All-State basketball team in Class 2A. In track & field, he competed as a sprinter and ran the third leg on the Bulldogs' 4 × 400 m relay squad, helping them win the Texas Class 2A T&F Meet with a time of 3:20.08 minutes.

Following his senior season, he played football at Kilgore Junior College in Kilgore, Texas, where he earned 2nd-Team JUCO All-America honors after leading the conference with 32 receptions for 545 receiving yards.

== College career ==
After his sophomore season at Kilgore, Ford chose to enroll at the University of Miami over scholarship offers from Arizona and Illinois. He played for the Miami Hurricanes football team as a tight end from 2010 to 2011. As a junior in 2010, he appeared in nine games, recording 37 yards against Notre Dame in the Sun Bowl. He had three games with at least two catches. As a senior in 2011, he played in all 12 games, recording at least one catch in seven games. He scored his lone touchdown of the season against Duke. He registered a season-high 33-yard reception against Kansas State. He also recorded two receptions in games against Florida State and Virginia.

He majored in sociology at the University of Miami, earning his degree in spring 2012.

== Professional career ==
Pre-draft measurables
| Height | Weight | 40-yard dash | 10-yard split | 20-yard split | 20-yard shuttle | Three-cone drill | Vertical jump | Broad jump | Bench press |
|---|---|---|---|---|---|---|---|---|---|
| 6 ft 6 in (1.98 m) | 255 lb (116 kg) | 4.75 s | 1.65 s | 2.81 s | 4.35 s | 7.34 s | 33 in (0.84 m) | 9 ft 2 in (2.79 m) | 20 reps |
All values from Miami Pro Day

=== Philadelphia Eagles ===
On April 29, 2012, he signed with the Philadelphia Eagles as an undrafted free agent, where he spent a week on the practice squad.

=== Minnesota Vikings ===
On December 26, 2012, he was signed with the Minnesota Vikings to join the practice squad. Ford was added to the roster in 2013 when starting tight end Kyle Rudolph was injured. In 2013, he played in nine games, recording 11 receptions for 133 yards with a 12.1 catch average. The following season, Ford played in 11 games with 23 catches for 258 yards and one touchdown.

Ford was waived by the Vikings on November 11, 2015. He was subsequently re-signed to the team's practice squad on November 13.

=== Baltimore Ravens ===
On November 17, 2015, Ford was signed by the Baltimore Ravens off of the Vikings' practice squad. He was placed on the team's injured reserve on November 30. On April 12, 2016, the Ravens waived Ford.

=== Cleveland Browns ===
Ford was claimed off waivers by the Cleveland Browns on April 13, 2016. On April 20, the Browns released Ford.
