= Big Sandy High School =

Big Sandy High School may mean:

- Big Sandy High School (Montana) — a public high school in Big Sandy, Chouteau County, Montana, with the team name "Pioneers" and team colors purple and gold
- Big Sandy High School (Big Sandy, Texas) — a public high school in Upshur County, Texas, with the team name "Wildcats" and team colors blue and gold
- Big Sandy High School (Dallardsville, Texas) — a public high school in Polk County, Texas, with the team name "Wildcats" and team colors purple and white
