= Asia, Texas =

- Unincorporated community
- Location within Texas Location within the United States
- Coordinates: 30°59′54″N 94°52′10″W
- Country: United States
- State: Texas
- County: Polk
- Elevation: 253 ft (77 m)
- Time zone: UTC-6 (Central (CST))
  - Summer (DST): UTC-5 (CDT)
- Area code: 936
- GNIS feature ID: 2034867

Asia is an unincorporated community in Polk County, Texas, United States.

The community is located north of U.S. Route 287 and is two miles west of Corrigan. It was founded in 1859 by James Standley, a veteran of the Mexican–American War.
