= Dave Mays (baseball) =

American baseball player

- Outfielder
- Born: December 3, 1910; Leggett, Texas, U.S.
- Died: June 23, 1993 (aged 82); Houston, Texas, U.S.

Negro league baseball debut
- 1937, for the Kansas City Monarchs

Last appearance
- 1937, for the Kansas City Monarchs

Teams
- Kansas City Monarchs (1937)

David Mays (December 3, 1910 – June 23, 1993) was an American Negro league outfielder in the 1930s.

A native of Leggett, Texas, Mays played for the Kansas City Monarchs in 1937. In 17 recorded games, he posted 14 hits in 61 plate appearances. Mays died in Houston, Texas in 1993 at age 82.
