= Barnum, Texas =

Barnum
- Unincorporated area
- Location within the state of Texas Barnum (the United States)
- Coordinates: 30°56′42″N 94°40′22″W
- Country: United States
- State: Texas
- County: Polk
- Elevation: 249 ft (76 m)
- Time zone: UTC-6 (Central (CST))
  - Summer (DST): UTC-5 (CDT)
- GNIS feature ID: 1379392

Barnum is an unincorporated community in Polk County, in the U.S. state of Texas.

== History ==
Barnum sprang up in 1881 around a sawmill built on a railroad line. Some believe the community was named after P. T. Barnum, an American businessman and circus founder, while other hold it was named for another Texas sawmill owner named Barnum.
