= Indian Springs, Texas =

- CDP
- Interactive map of Indian Springs, Texas
- Coordinates: 30°41′21″N 94°44′56″W
- Country: United States
- State: Texas
- County: Polk

Area
  - Total: 1.9 sq mi (4.9 km^{2})
  - Land: 1.8 sq mi (4.7 km^{2})
  - Water: 0.077 sq mi (0.2 km^{2})
- Elevation: 358 ft (109 m)

Population (2010)
  - Total: 785
  - Density: 430/sq mi (170/km^{2})
- Time zone: UTC-6 (Central (CST))
  - Summer (DST): UTC-5 (CDT)
- Zip Code: 77351
- GNIS feature ID: 2586941

Indian Springs is a census-designated place (CDP) in Polk County, Texas, United States. As of the 2020 census, Indian Springs had a population of 892.

This was a new CDP for the 2010 census.

== Geography ==
Indian Springs has a total area of 1.9 square miles (4.9 km^{2}), of which 1.8 square miles (4.7 km^{2}) is land and 0.1 square miles (0.26 km^{2}) is water.

== Demographics ==
Historical population
Census	Pop.	Note	%±
2010	785		—
2020	892		13.6%
U.S. Decennial Census; 1850–1900 1910; 1920 1930 1940; 1950 1960 1970; 1980 1990 2000; 2010 2020

Indian Springs first appeared as a census designated place in the 2010 U.S. census.

=== 2020 census ===
Indian Springs CDP, Texas – Racial and ethnic composition Note: the US Census treats Hispanic/Latino as an ethnic category. This table excludes Latinos from the racial categories and assigns them to a separate category. Hispanics/Latinos may be of any race.
Race / Ethnicity (NH = Non-Hispanic)	Pop 2010	Pop 2020	% 2010	% 2020
White alone (NH)	709	750	90.32%	84.08%
Black or African American alone (NH)	2	7	0.25%	0.78%
Native American or Alaska Native alone (NH)	28	37	3.57%	4.15%
Asian alone (NH)	7	2	0.89%	0.22%
Native Hawaiian or Pacific Islander alone (NH)	0	0	0.00%	0.00%
Other race alone (NH)	0	1	0.00%	0.11%
Mixed race or Multiracial (NH)	2	44	0.25%	4.93%
Hispanic or Latino (any race)	37	51	4.71%	5.72%
Total	785	892	100.00%	100.00%

== Education ==
The community is within the Livingston Independent School District.
