= Seven Oaks, Texas =

- City
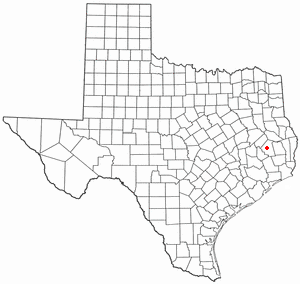
- Location of Seven Oaks, Texas

- Coordinates: 30°51′13″N 94°51′23″W
- Country: United States
- State: Texas
- County: Polk

Area
  - Total: 1.40 sq mi (3.62 km^{2})
  - Land: 1.40 sq mi (3.62 km^{2})
  - Water: 0 sq mi (0.00 km^{2})
- Elevation: 220 ft (67 m)

Population (2020)
  - Total: 68
  - Density: 49/sq mi (19/km^{2})
- Time zone: UTC-6 (Central (CST))
  - Summer (DST): UTC-5 (CDT)
- ZIP code: 77350
- Area code: 936
- FIPS code: 48-66884
- GNIS feature ID: 2411869

Seven Oaks is a city in Polk County, Texas, United States. The population was 68 at the 2020 census.

== Geography ==
According to the United States Census Bureau, the city has a total area of 1.4 square miles (3.6 km^{2}), all land.

US 59 passes through the city.

== Demographics ==
Historical population
Census	Pop.	Note	%±
1970	224		—
1980	300		33.9%
1990	171		−43.0%
2000	131		−23.4%
2010	111		−15.3%
2020	68		−38.7%
U.S. Decennial Census

=== Racial and ethnic composition ===
Seven Oaks city, Texas – Racial and ethnic composition Note: the US Census treats Hispanic/Latino as an ethnic category. This table excludes Latinos from the racial categories and assigns them to a separate category. Hispanics/Latinos may be of any race.
Race / Ethnicity (NH = Non-Hispanic)	Pop 2000	Pop 2010	Pop 2020	% 2000	% 2010	% 2020
White alone (NH)	30	29	25	22.90%	26.13%	36.76%
Black or African American alone (NH)	76	77	28	58.02%	69.37%	41.18%
Native American or Alaska Native alone (NH)	0	4	0	0.00%	3.60%	0.00%
Asian alone (NH)	7	0	0	5.34%	0.00%	0.00%
Native Hawaiian or Pacific Islander alone (NH)	0	0	0	0.00%	0.00%	0.00%
Other race alone (NH)	0	0	0	0.00%	0.00%	0.00%
Mixed race or Multiracial (NH)	1	0	6	0.76%	0.00%	8.82%
Hispanic or Latino (any race)	17	1	9	12.98%	0.90%	13.24%
Total	131	111	68	100.00%	100.00%	100.00%

=== 2020 census ===
As of the 2020 census, Seven Oaks had a population of 68. The median age was 43.3 years. 20.6% of residents were under the age of 18 and 23.5% of residents were 65 years of age or older. For every 100 females there were 94.3 males, and for every 100 females age 18 and over there were 86.2 males age 18 and over.

0.0% of residents lived in urban areas, while 100.0% lived in rural areas.

There were 30 households in Seven Oaks, of which 46.7% had children under the age of 18 living in them. Of all households, 36.7% were married-couple households, 23.3% were households with a male householder and no spouse or partner present, and 36.7% were households with a female householder and no spouse or partner present. About 10.0% of all households were made up of individuals and 0.0% had someone living alone who was 65 years of age or older.

There were 41 housing units, of which 26.8% were vacant. The homeowner vacancy rate was 0.0% and the rental vacancy rate was 0.0%.

Racial composition as of the 2020 census
Race	Number	Percent
White	28	41.2%
Black or African American	28	41.2%
American Indian and Alaska Native	0	0.0%
Asian	0	0.0%
Native Hawaiian and Other Pacific Islander	0	0.0%
Some other race	5	7.4%
Two or more races	7	10.3%

=== 2000 census ===
As of the census of 2000, there were 131 people, 48 households, and 34 families residing in the city. The population density was 94.3 inhabitants per square mile (36.4/km^{2}). There were 75 housing units at an average density of 54.0 per square mile (20.8/km^{2}). The racial makeup of the city was 22.90% White, 58.02% African American, 5.34% Asian, 10.69% from other races, and 3.05% from two or more races. Hispanic or Latino of any race were 12.98% of the population.

There were 48 households, out of which 37.5% had children under the age of 18 living with them, 47.9% were married couples living together, 18.8% had a female householder with no husband present, and 27.1% were non-families. 25.0% of all households were made up of individuals, and 16.7% had someone living alone who was 65 years of age or older. The average household size was 2.73 and the average family size was 3.23.

In the city, the population was spread out, with 28.2% under the age of 18, 6.9% from 18 to 24, 29.8% from 25 to 44, 19.8% from 45 to 64, and 15.3% who were 65 years of age or older. The median age was 36 years. For every 100 females, there were 114.8 males. For every 100 females age 18 and over, there were 91.8 males.

The median income for a household in the city was $34,500, and the median income for a family was $34,750. Males had a median income of $31,500 versus $17,500 for females. The per capita income for the city was $15,504. There were 10.3% of families and 7.9% of the population living below the poverty line, including no under eighteens and 15.4% of those over 64.

== Education ==
The City of Seven Oaks is served by the Corrigan-Camden Independent School District and the Leggett Independent School District, each having a portion of Seven Oaks. Corrigan-Camden High School is operated by the former.

The Texas Legislature designated Polk County as being in the boundary of Angelina College's district.
