= Pleasant Hill, Polk County, Texas =

Pleasant Hill, Texas
- CDP
- Interactive map of Pleasant Hill, Texas
- Coordinates: 30°59′52″N 94°47′35″W
- Country: United States
- State: Texas
- County: Polk

Area
  - Total: 2.7 sq mi (7.0 km^{2})
  - Land: 2.6 sq mi (6.7 km^{2})
  - Water: 0.12 sq mi (0.3 km^{2})
- Elevation: 220 ft (67 m)

Population (2010)
  - Total: 522
  - Density: 200/sq mi (78/km^{2})
- Time zone: UTC-6 (Central (CST))
  - Summer (DST): UTC-5 (CDT)
- Zip Code: 75939
- GNIS feature ID: 2586972

Pleasant Hill is a census-designated place (CDP) in Polk County, Texas, United States. This was a new CDP for the 2010 census, with a population of 522.

== Geography ==
The CDP has a total area of 2.7 square miles (7.0 km^{2}), of which 0.1 square miles (0.26 km^{2}) is covered by water.

== Demographics ==
Historical population
Census	Pop.	Note	%±
2010	522		—
2020	610		16.9%
U.S. Decennial Census; 1850–1900 1910; 1920 1930 1940; 1950 1960 1970; 1980 1990 2000; 2010 2020

Pleasant Hill first appeared as a census designated place in the 2010 U.S. census.

=== 2020 census ===
Pleasant Hill CDP, Texas – Racial and ethnic composition Note: the US Census treats Hispanic/Latino as an ethnic category. This table excludes Latinos from the racial categories and assigns them to a separate category. Hispanics/Latinos may be of any race.
Race / Ethnicity (NH = Non-Hispanic)	Pop 2010	Pop 2020	% 2010	% 2020
White alone (NH)	200	206	38.31%	33.77%
Black or African American alone (NH)	26	44	4.98%	7.21%
Native American or Alaska Native alone (NH)	0	0	0.00%	0.00%
Asian alone (NH)	3	11	0.57%	1.80%
Native Hawaiian or Pacific Islander alone (NH)	0	0	0.00%	0.00%
Other race alone (NH)	0	3	0.00%	0.49%
Mixed race or multiracial (NH)	4	8	0.77%	1.31%
Hispanic or Latino (any race)	289	338	55.36%	55.41%
Total	522	610	100.00%	100.00%

== Education ==
Pleasant Hill is in the Corrigan-Camden Independent School District, which operates Corrigan-Camden High School.

The Texas Legislature designated Polk County as being within the boundary of Angelina College's district.
