= East Tempe, Texas =

East Tempe
- Unincorporated area
- Location within the state of Texas East Tempe (the United States)
- Coordinates: 30°42′13″N 94°59′06″W
- Country: United States
- State: Texas
- County: Polk
- Elevation: 141 ft (43 m)

Population (2000)
  - Total: 200
- Time zone: UTC-6 (Central (CST))
  - Summer (DST): UTC-5 (CDT)
- GNIS feature ID: 2034985

East Tempe is an unincorporated community in west central Polk County, Texas, United States. The community, on Farm to Market Road 350, is 75 miles (121 km) north of Houston. The community, on the periphery of Livingston, was named after the East Tempe Creek, a creek which flows through the area.

== History ==
In 1860, settlers were farming lands around East Tempe. Circa 1880, a sawmill opened. The Beaumont and Great Northern Railway opened in 1908; East Tempe, a flag stop, was connected to Livingston and Trinity via the railroad. The railroad closed in 1949. East Tempe had approximately 100 residents in 1990 and around 200 residents in 2000.
