= Israel, Polk County, Texas =

Town in Polk County, Texas

Israel
- Unincorporated community
- Location within Texas Israel (the United States)
- Coordinates: 30°44′33″N 94°53′31″W
- Country: United States
- State: Texas
- County: Polk County
- Time zone: CST

Israel is an unincorporated religious intentional community located along Farm Road 1316 in Polk County, Texas, United States.

== History ==
Israel was established in 1895, by a religious group known as the Israelites. The Israelites had split from the Flying Roll, a sect of Adventism. They were vegetarian subsistence farmers; they also grew their hair out. They platted their community on 144 acres of land, and within their community, they operated a church: the New House of Israel. The population was 75 in 1909, which declined through the 20th century, though the population rose slightly, to 25 in 2000.
