= Moscow, Texas =

Moscow
- Unincorporated area
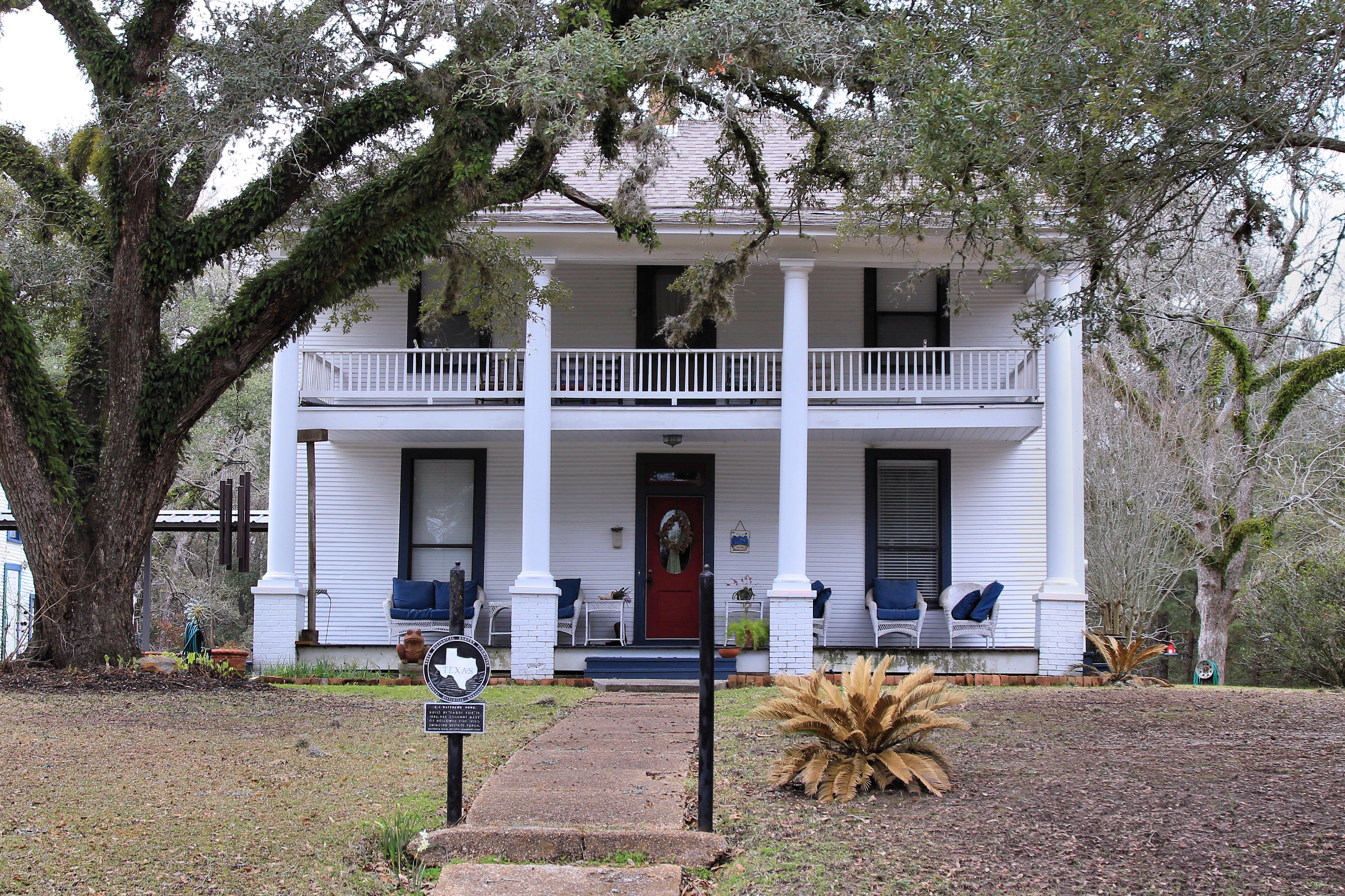
- The historic E. C. Matthews Home in Moscow.

- Location within the state of Texas Moscow (the United States)
- Coordinates: 30°54′48″N 94°49′31″W
- Country: United States
- State: Texas
- County: Polk
- Named for: Moscow, Russia
- Elevation: 345 ft (105 m)

Population (2000)
  - Total: 170
- Time zone: UTC-6 (Central (CST))
  - Summer (DST): UTC-5 (CDT)
- ZIP code: 75960
- Area code: 936
- GNIS feature ID: 1363185

Moscow is an unincorporated community in Polk County, Texas, United States. As of the 2000 United States census, the community had about 170 residents.

== Geography ==
Moscow is at the junction of U.S. Highway 59 and Farm to Market Road 350, 90 miles north of Houston in central Polk County.

== History ==
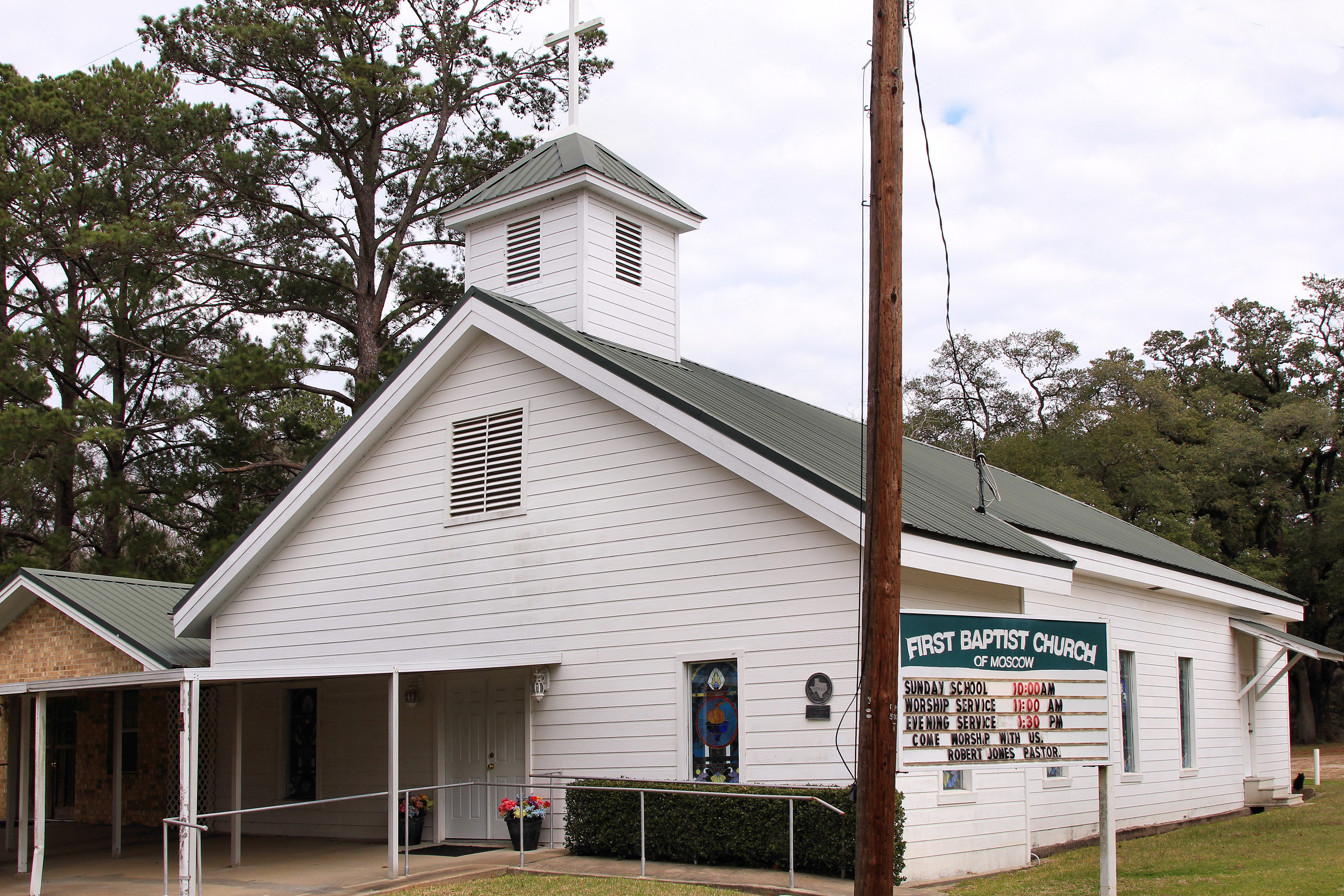
The First Baptist Church of Moscow

David and Matilda Green first settled the area in the 1840s. The first post office was established in 1847 under Green's name. The community's name was changed to Moscow, after Moscow, Russia, in 1853, as the postal authorities deemed the proposed name of Greenville as being too similar to Greensboro, Texas. The First Baptist Church was established in 1849. Moscow became a trading center for Polk County farmers during the latter 1850s and a stage stop on the Liberty-Nacogdoches Road, with cotton gins, shops, saloons, and a hotel.

The town was noted for its school, the Moscow Masonic Academy (or Moscow Masonic High School, depending on source). Built in 1853 as the Moscow Masonic Male and Female Academy, the institution served the community under its latter name from 1857. Future Texas Governor William P. Hobby attended the school. The school burned down around 1935.

The Houston, East and West Texas Railway reached the town in 1880 followed by the seven-mile-long Moscow, Camden and San Augustine Railroad in 1899, one of the shortest railroads in Texas. A mule-drawn streetcar line linked the train station with the business district.

Sawmills in Moscow supported the burgeoning logging industry. A cannery for vegetables and fruit and a column factory (making architectural columns) were early industries in the town that helped diversify Moscow's economy.

In 1880, with an estimated 228 residents, Moscow was the largest town in Polk County. By 1900, its population had reached 263. By the 1920s, the lumber supply in East Texas began to dwindle due to overharvesting. During the Great Depression, many farmers went bankrupt and lumber companies left the area due to the economic conditions. With the decline of logging and agriculture, Moscow's population began to decline, also, and per the 2000 census, the population was 170.

== Education ==
Moscow is served by Corrigan-Camden Independent School District.

== Notable person ==
- William P. Hobby, publisher of the Houston Post and the 27th governor of Texas from 1917 to 1921.
