= Laurelia, Texas =

Laurelia
- Ghost town
- Location within the state of Texas Laurelia (the United States)
- Coordinates: 30°58′11.27″N 94°49′20.28″W
- Country: United States
- State: Texas
- County: Polk
- Time zone: UTC-6 (Central (CST))
  - Summer (DST): UTC-5 (CDT)

Laurelia is a ghost town in central Polk County, Texas, United States. The town was founded after Judge Claiborne Holshausen built a sawmill in 1880. The location grew into a town and was named for the laurels that dominated the area. The mill remained the nucleus of the town, and after the sawmill burned in 1913, the town dwindled.
