= Hurricane Bonnie (1986) =

Category 1 Atlantic hurricane in 1986

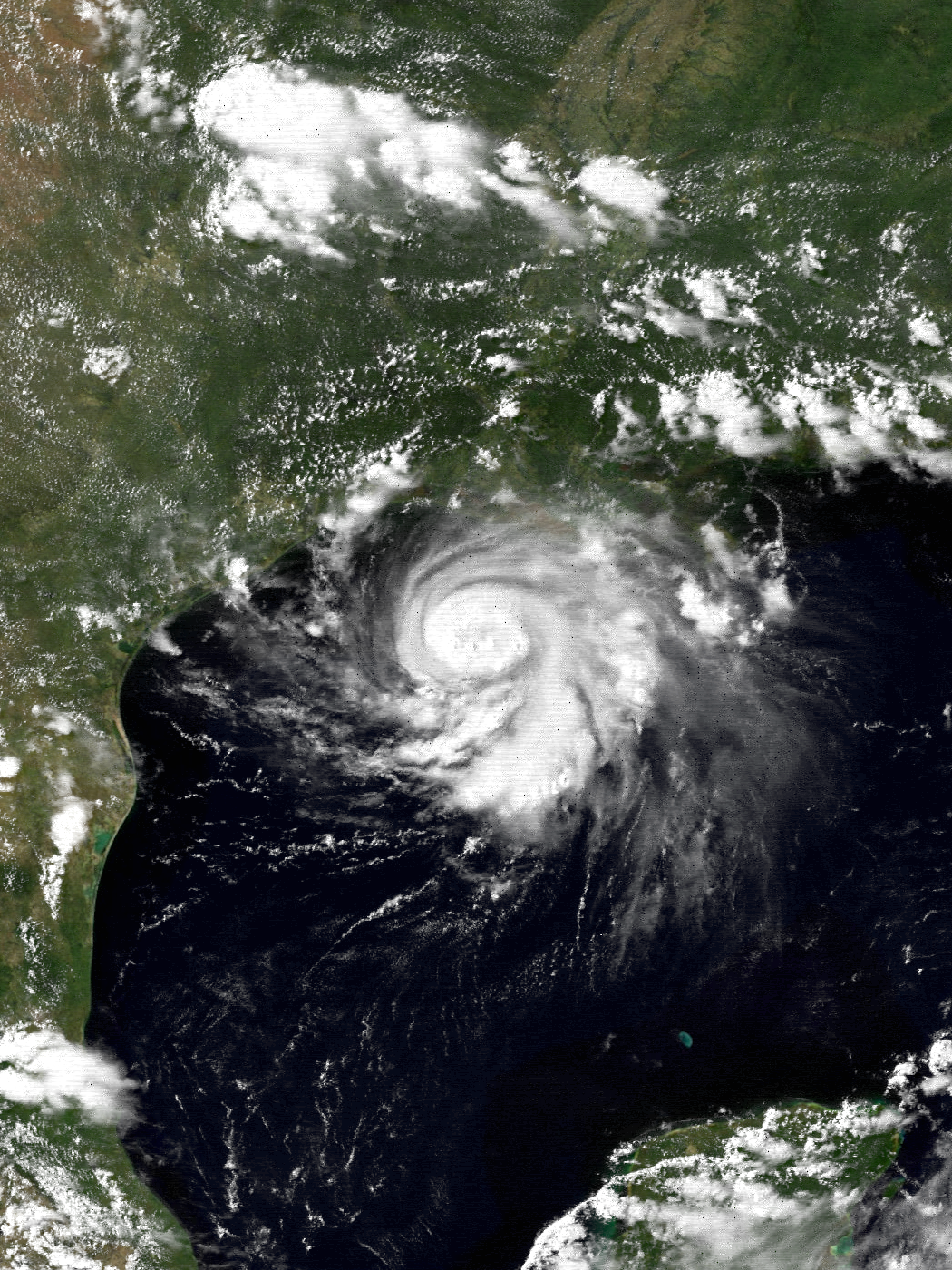
- Bonnie at peak intensity off the coast of Texas on June 26

Meteorological history
- Formed: June 23, 1986
- Dissipated: June 28, 1986

Category 1 hurricane
- 1-minute sustained (SSHWS/NWS)
- Highest winds: 85 mph (140 km/h)
- Lowest pressure: 990 mbar (hPa); 29.23 inHg

Overall effects
- Fatalities: 5
- Damage: $42 million (1986 USD)
- Areas affected: Texas, Louisiana, Southeastern United States
- IBTrACS
- Part of the 1986 Atlantic hurricane season

Hurricane Bonnie caused moderate damage along the Gulf Coast of the United States in late June 1986. The second named storm and first hurricane of the 1986 Atlantic hurricane season, Bonnie developed out of an area of low pressure over the central Gulf of Mexico on June 23. The system gradually intensified and was declared Tropical Storm Bonnie the next day as it moved generally towards the west-northwest. On June 25, Bonnie was upgraded to a hurricane. Bonnie strengthened further and on the following day, the storm attained its peak intensity with maximum sustained winds of 85 mph (137 km/h). (Note: All wind speeds are 1-minute sustained) Shortly thereafter, Bonnie made landfall near High Island, Texas. Following landfall, Bonnie quickly weakened below tropical storm status and dissipated over Missouri on June 28.

Prior to Bonnie moving ashore, 22,000 people were evacuated in Texas and Louisiana. Upon making landfall, Bonnie produced a storm surge peaking at 5.2 feet (1.6 m) at Sabine Pass. Rainfall from the storm peaked at 13 inches (330 mm) in Ace, Texas, which caused some street flooding and destroyed a small dam in Liberty County, Texas. Three fatalities were reported in the Port Arthur, Texas area; two deaths were from separate car accidents and another occurred after a partially paralyzed woman died in a house fire. Flooding also impacted northwestern Louisiana. In the Shreveport area alone, 381 homes, 20 businesses, and 80 major highway intersections were flooded. The hurricane also spawned 11 tornadoes, destroying about 25 houses in southwestern Louisiana. Overall, Hurricane Bonnie caused $42 million (1986 USD) in damage and five fatalities.

== Meteorological history ==
Map plotting the storm's track and intensity, according to the Saffir–Simpson scale Map key Saffir–Simpson scale Tropical depression (≤38 mph, ≤62 km/h) Tropical storm (39–73 mph, 63–118 km/h) Category 1 (74–95 mph, 119–153 km/h) Category 2 (96–110 mph, 154–177 km/h) Category 3 (111–129 mph, 178–208 km/h) Category 4 (130–156 mph, 209–251 km/h) Category 5 (≥157 mph, ≥252 km/h) Unknown Storm type Tropical cyclone Subtropical cyclone Extratropical cyclone, remnant low, tropical disturbance, or monsoon depression

In mid-June, a mid-level center of circulation formed in association with a quasi-stationary cold front that stretched across northern Florida and the extreme northeast Gulf of Mexico. On June 20, a weak and disorganized area of low pressure developed in conjunction with the front and it passed by Tampa Bay, Florida the following day. Upon moving into the eastern Gulf of Mexico, there was little convection observed on satellite imagery, although a distinguishable wind-shift was noted by an offshore buoy. However, by June 23, the presence of deep convection atop a circulation had become well-defined enough for the National Hurricane Center to classify the disturbance as a tropical depression, while centered 330 mi (530 km) southwest of Cape Coral, Florida. Moving generally west to west-northwestward across the central Gulf of Mexico, the National Hurricane Center sent a reconnaissance plane into the tropical depression at 1500 UTC on June 24, at which time winds of 60 mph (97 km/h) were found. About three hours later, the depression strengthened into Tropical Storm Bonnie.

In the 24 hours after becoming a tropical storm, satellite imagery showed a substantial increase in upper-level outflow as Tropical Storm Bonnie gradually intensified. A reconnaissance plane into the system shortly before 1200 UTC on June 25 revealed hurricane-force winds 1,500 ft (460 m) above the surface. This evidence was the basis of Bonnie's upgrade to a Category 1 on the Saffir–Simpson hurricane wind scale at 1800 UTC on June 25. During the afternoon hours of June 26, Bonnie reached its peak intensity with maximum sustained winds of 85 mph (137 km/h) and a minimum barometric pressure of 990 mbar (990 hPa; 29 inHg). While accelerating towards the northwest, the hurricane retained this intensity until landfall near High Island, Texas at 1000 UTC on June 26. Eight hours later, Bonnie weakened to a tropical storm and was downgraded to tropical depression status at 0000 UTC on June 27. The depression persisted until 1200 UTC on June 28, at which time it was absorbed by a frontal zone while located over the U.S. state of Missouri.

== Preparations ==
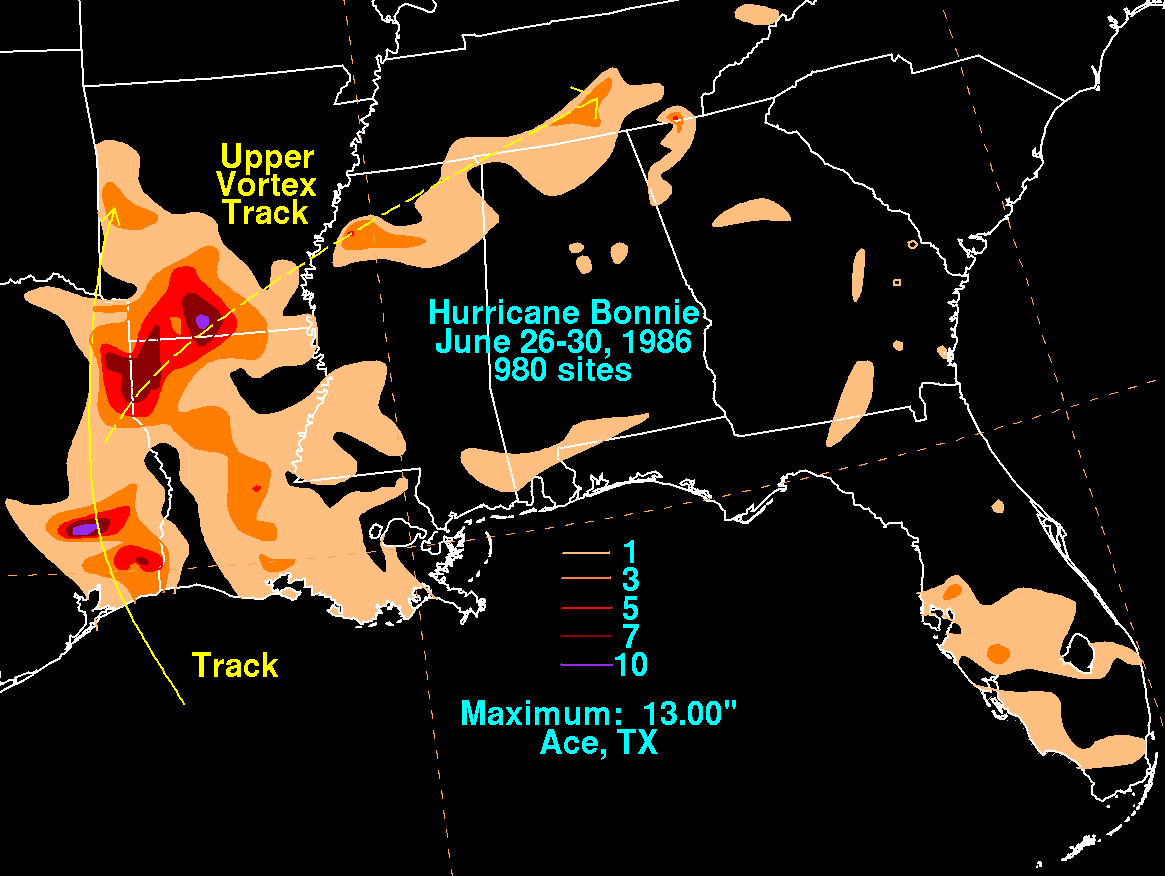
Rainfall totals in the United States

Upon the system being classified as a tropical depression, a high risk of landfall near Port Arthur, Texas was noted, giving federal officials sufficient lead time to warn local residents about a possible approaching hurricane. As the system neared landfall, tropical cyclone watches and warnings were issued for the Gulf Coast of the United States. At 1200 UTC on June 25, the National Hurricane Center issued a gale warning and a hurricane watch, stretching from Port O'Connor, Texas to the mouth of the Mississippi River. A few hours later, a hurricane warning was issued for area west of Morgan City, Louisiana to Freeport, Texas. In advance of the approaching storm, roughly 22,000 residents were evacuated, with 10,000 from Galveston County, Texas alone.

== Impact ==
Due to the small size of Hurricane Bonnie, damage was relatively light, totaling to $42 million. The storm was also attributed to five deaths, four in Texas and one in Louisiana.

=== Texas ===
In some areas of eastern Texas, the storm dropped 10 to 13 in (250 to 330 mm) of rain, with a peak total of 13 inches (330 mm) in Ace. Heavy rains caused by Bonnie also lead a small dam collapse in northeastern Liberty County, Texas, resulting in severe flooding. In Hardin County, the Pine Island Bayou overflowed, causing water to enter hundreds of homes and businesses. Several major roadways were flooded due to flooding, including Highway 59 between Livingston and Shepherd, U.S. Route 79 in Panola County, and Interstate 20 and several farm-to-market roads in Harrison County. The Bear Foot Lake dam overflowed, damaging some homes and forcing 200 families to evacuate. Overall, approximately 1,300 people in southeastern Texas fled their homes due to flooding. Severe flooding left behind by the heavy rains caused $5 million in damage.

In addition to rain and flooding, winds damaged more homes and businesses, and a tornado was spawned a few miles southwest of Port Arthur. More than 19,000 power outages were reported in the area near where Bonnie made landfall. Texas State Highway 87 was closed in Jefferson County due to debris and electrical poles fallen on the roadway. The storm left broken windows, scattered tree limbs, and debris filled streets in Port Arthur and Beaumont. At the latter, strong winds toppled a radio tower at the Texas Department of Public Safety building, while several schools suffered damage to the roof and windows. Marinas and boats at Lake Sam Rayburn were damaged. Hank Creek Marina, located across the lake, broke free from its moorings and floated away, while portions of were submerged. Four indirect fatalities were confirmed in Texas, two from traffic accidents, one from a house fire ignited by a candle, and another from drowning. Several injuries were also reported, including four after a truck flipped over due to strong winds.

=== Louisiana ===
Most of the damage in Louisiana occurred in Cameron Parish. Twenty-five homes, trailers, and cabins in southwestern Louisiana were destroyed, resulting in about $400,000 in damages. Two tornadoes were spawned in Webster Parish. The first caused about $15,000 in damage to the roofs of three homes. The other tornado destroyed three mobile homes and severely damaged an additional two as well as three permanent homes. Damage from this tornado totaled $200,000. Just south of Blanchard, 10.2 in (260 mm) of rain fell within a 12-hour period. Interstate 20 was closed from Shreveport to the Louisiana-Texas state line due to flooding, with as much as 5 ft (1.5 m) of standing water near Greenwood.

Torrential rains caused water inundation up to 10 ft (3.0 m) in some areas of Shreveport. Firefighters used boats to rescue some stranded Shreveport residents in their homes by sudden high water. Rescuers also had to bind themselves together to rescue some people stranded in a flooded trailer park. Flooding in the city forced police to barricade 50 major highway intersections. Along the shore of Cross Lake, about 80 homes were damaged by water intrusion. About 381 homes and 20 businesses in Shreveport were damaged by flooding. A tornado spawned in the city overturned an airplane at Shreveport Downtown Airport, damaged a roof from a house, and shattered a number of windows. No injuries were reported from the tornado. Damage in Louisiana from flooding alone totaled $11–13 million, with $4 million to highways and bridges, $1–2 million to vehicles, $5 million to property, and $1–2 million to boats. Three fishermen were tossed into a lake after a boat was capsized due to high winds. Two were rescued, but one perished.

=== Elsewhere ===
Heavy rains from the remnant low-pressure area of Bonnie led to heavy rains in several states in the Southeastern United States. Rainfall was generally minor in most areas, however in Arkansas, rains totaled up to 11.75 in (298 mm) at the South Arkansas Regional Airport. Several roads were washed out in Ouachita County near Elliott. A number of roads and bridges were also washed out in Union County, with damage totaling $200,000. U.S. Route 79 was closed between Magnolia and Stephens because of standing water. Three or four families evacuated near the Ouachita-Union County line after the Smackover Creek overflowed its banks and flooded 20 homes. There was also a small area of heavy rains totaling up to 5 in (130 mm) along the border of Tennessee and Georgia.

== See also ==
- Other storms named Bonnie
- 1986 Atlantic hurricane season
- List of wettest tropical cyclones in the United States
- Hurricane Barry (2019) - a storm that took a nearly identical track.
