= Moscow, Camden and San Augustine Railroad =

Overview
- Headquarters: Camden, Texas
- Reporting mark: MCSA
- Locale: Texas
- Dates of operation: 1898–present

Technical
- Track gauge: 4 ft 8 1/2 in (1,435 mm) standard gauge

The Moscow, Camden & San Augustine Railroad Company (reporting mark MCSA) is a Class III short line railroad headquartered in Camden, Texas. It is a subsidiary of Georgia-Pacific.

The MCSA operates a 6.9 mi (11.1 km) line from Camden to an interchange with the Union Pacific Railroad in Moscow, Texas. Although it is legally a common carrier, the line’s traffic consists entirely of outbound plywood, lumber, and other forest products originating from a single industry, the Georgia-Pacific mill in Camden.

Despite its diminutive length, the MCSA holds several Texas historical distinctions. It is the oldest railroad in Texas still operating under its original charter. It was among the last railroads in Texas to operate regular revenue trains using steam locomotives and to operate regularly scheduled passenger train service.

== History ==
The MCSA was chartered in June 1898 to build a line from Moscow to San Augustine, Texas by way of Camden, primarily to move products from a new W.T. Carter & Brother Lumber Company sawmill in Camden to the Houston East & West Texas Railway main line in Moscow. The lumber company’s owners provided the financing and owned most of the new railroad’s stock. The line from Moscow to Camden was completed on November 19, 1898 and was never extended to San Augustine.

At Camden, the MCSA connected to an extensive network of private W.T. Carter Company rail lines, incorporated as the Camden and Northeastern Railroad, that were used to transport freshly cut timber from remote logging camps to the sawmill. Starting in the 1940s, these rail lines were gradually phased out as the lumber company made increasing use of trucks for timber extraction. Since the lumber company owned both rail operations, this process made plenty of surplus W.T. Carter steam locomotives available for use by the MCSA, delaying the onset of dieselization. The MCSA would not obtain its first diesel-electric locomotive until 1960 and still used steam power until 1965, one of the last common-carrier railroads in Texas to do so.

In 1968, the W.T. Carter & Bro. Lumber Company and the MCSA were purchased by Champion International. In 2000, both companies were acquired by International Paper. Georgia Pacific acquired all assets from International Paper (Mill and Railroad) in April 2007 and is the current owner.

== Passenger train service ==
When MCSA operations began in 1898, Texas law required railroads to operate passenger service in order to claim common carrier status. In 1927, the railroad's original passenger car was replaced by a wood combine car built in 1898 for the Long Island Rail Road. It would be the last passenger car ever owned by the MCSA.

In its early years, the railroad provided a vital link to the outside world for the residents of Camden. Ridership declined sharply in the 1930s as highways were constructed in the area and automobiles and buses became more popular. However, passenger service remained profitable enough to justify its continuation. In the 1950s, its popularity increased as tourists and railfans became attracted to the pleasant East Texas forest scenery, the old-fashioned wood combine, the rustic wooden train station at Camden, and the steam locomotives. Other attractions in Camden included the quaint, old-fashioned company store and the “Locomotive Graveyard”, a portion of the railroad yard where a number of old MCSA and W.T. Carter steam locomotives had been left to decay in the elements.

In the 1960s and early 1970s, passenger service remained popular despite dieselization of the MCSA and discontinuation of regular connecting passenger service by the Southern Pacific Railroad at Moscow. After the line was purchased by Champion International, the new owners became concerned about the possibility of civil liability in the event of an accident, especially given the age of the railroad’s 1898 wood combine. Passenger service was finally discontinued in July 1973.

== See also ==
- List of Texas railroads
