= Onalaska, Texas =

City in Polk County, Texas, United States

- City
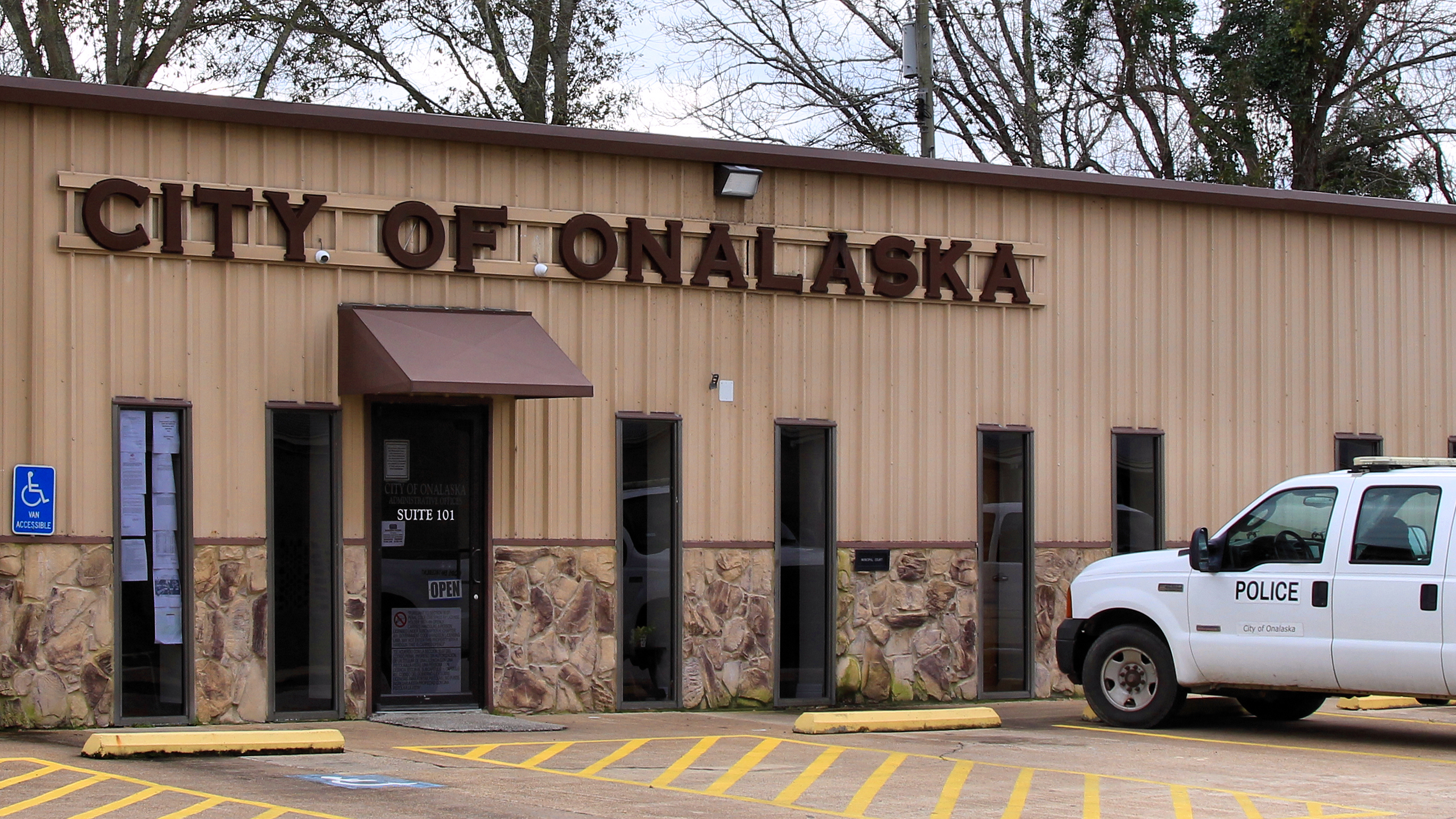
- City Hall
- Motto: The Heart of Lake Livingston
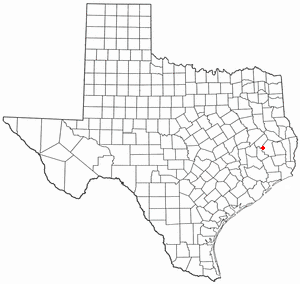
- Location of Onalaska, Texas

- Coordinates: 30°49′24″N 95°07′18″W
- Country: United States
- State: Texas
- County: Polk
- Incorporated: July 12, 1971
- Settled: 1840

Government
  - Type: General law city (Type A)
  - Mayor: Oz Canel

Area
  - Total: 5.35 sq mi (13.85 km^{2})
  - Land: 5.32 sq mi (13.79 km^{2})
  - Water: 0.019 sq mi (0.05 km^{2})
- Elevation: 203 ft (62 m)

Population (2020)
  - Total: 3,020
- Time zone: UTC-6 (Central (CST))
  - Summer (DST): UTC-5 (CDT)
- ZIP Code: 77360
- Area code: 936
- FIPS code: 48-54048
- GNIS feature ID: 2411321
- Website: City of Onalaska

Onalaska is a city in Polk County, Texas, United States. Situated on a peninsula on Lake Livingston, it had a population of 3,020 at the 2020 census.

Settled during the Republic of Texas period, the site remained a small farming community until the lumberman William Carlisle developed it as a company town around 1905, building a large sawmill and chartering the Beaumont and Great Northern Railroad to serve it. Onalaska boomed to a population of about 2,000 by 1908, but the exhaustion of local timber and flooding on the Trinity River closed the mill, and the town declined to roughly eighty residents by the late 1940s. The completion of Lake Livingston in 1968 reversed that decline, and Onalaska has since grown as a recreation and retirement community. The city was struck by a deadly tornado in April 2020. Onalaska also drew national attention as the registered address of more than a thousand aircraft despite having no airport, an anomaly exposed in a 2019 investigation that led to federal drug-trafficking convictions and a change in aircraft registration law.

== Etymology ==
The name derives, at several removes, from "Oonalaska," a rendering of Unalaska in the Aleutian Islands used by the Scottish poet Thomas Campbell in his 1799 poem The Pleasures of Hope. The spelling "Onalaska" was adopted for a lumber town in Arkansas and subsequently became a naming convention within the Carlisle lumber interests, which also gave the name to communities in Washington and Wisconsin. According to the Handbook of Texas, Carlisle named the Texas town after an older mill town he had operated at Onalaska, Arkansas.

== History ==
=== Early settlement ===
The area was settled during the Republic of Texas period, with local accounts placing the first settlement in 1840. It remained a sparsely populated farming district in western Polk County until the arrival of the lumber industry in the first decade of the 20th century.

=== Carlisle Lumber Company and the company town ===
William Carlisle, a lumberman based in Atchison, Kansas, sent L. O. Jackson to Polk County in 1903 to select a mill site; Jackson acquired several thousand acres of timberland in the area between Trinity, Groveton, Corrigan, and Livingston. Carlisle developed the townsite about 1905 and brought roughly thirty experienced workers with him from his Arkansas operation. Jackson served as manager of mill construction and operations and remained a leading figure in the town.

By 1908 Onalaska had a railroad depot, a bank, a hotel, an electric power plant, and a population of about 2,000 — larger, at its peak, than the county seat at Livingston. Electricity for both the mill and the town was generated by two 150-kilowatt direct current machines. The community also supported two hotels, a hospital, a movie theater, a park, a cold-storage plant, and a commissary.

==== Town plan and segregation ====
In keeping with Jim Crow-era practice, housing was racially segregated into three districts. White employees occupied roughly seventy houses centered on Main Street; a district of about forty houses west of a dividing creek housed Black employees; and a separate quarter further east housed Mexican laborers, whose homes were painted red, giving rise to the local name "Red Quarters." Married employees were furnished company housing at a rent of $5 per month, which included water and electricity.

==== Railroad ====
To move its lumber, the Carlisle interests chartered the Beaumont and Great Northern Railroad on June 22, 1905, with capital stock of $370,000 and its principal place of business at Onalaska. Carlisle and his partner George W. Pennell sat on the first board of directors alongside Jackson. Between August 1905 and May 1908 the company built thirty-three miles of track running from Trinity through Onalaska to Livingston, connecting the town to the wider rail network.

The line passed to the Missouri–Kansas–Texas Railroad ("the Katy") under a long-term lease in 1914, but reverted to its original owners and resumed independent operation on April 1, 1923, as the Waco, Beaumont, Trinity and Sabine Railway. It was abandoned in stages, with the Livingston segment retired in 1949 and the last track removed in 1961.

=== Decline of the mill ===
The West Lumber Company, controlled by the Houston lumberman James M. West Sr., had purchased the sawmill by 1909. Flooding from the Trinity River and the exhaustion of the surrounding timber brought operations to an end; according to the Handbook of Texas, the sawmill had been dismantled by 1913.

Local accounts give later and mutually inconsistent chronologies: the city's own history variously dates West's purchase to 1912 with closure in 1924, and elsewhere describes a sale to West in 1909 for $4 million, a fire and rebuilding in 1915, and operation until the end of 1928. Whichever date is correct, the town's decline was rapid: the population fell from about 2,000 in 1908 to roughly 1,250 by 1925, and to about eighty residents by the late 1940s. Onalaska persisted as a modest agricultural community, the cleared bottomland left behind by the loggers proving suitable for cotton. As late as 1961 the town had only two rated businesses.

=== Lake Livingston and revival ===
The completion of Lake Livingston in 1968 transformed the local economy, and Onalaska experienced a second period of growth driven by recreation, retirement settlement, and real estate. The number of rated businesses rose from two in 1961 to twenty-eight by 1984.

In an incorporation election held on July 12, 1971, residents voted 45 to 18, of 63 ballots cast, in favor of incorporation, and the Polk County judge declared Onalaska incorporated as a town. The governing body later changed the municipality's designation from town to city under the Texas Local Government Code.

Growth accelerated in the 21st century, with the population rising from 1,174 in 2000 to 3,020 in 2020.

=== Recent developments ===
Onalaska City Park, an 8-acre (3.2 ha) green space on FM 356, opened in 2015; the same year the Garland family donated the 6,400-square-foot (590 m^{2}) Garland Pavilion, which serves as a venue for city events.

The city has been awarded funding through the Texas General Land Office's regional mitigation grant program, financed by federal Community Development Block Grant mitigation funds; its adopted budgets carried $679,000 of this grant income in fiscal year 2023–2024. In 2024 the city announced plans to apply for the 2025–2026 Texas Community Development Fund.

== Geography ==
Onalaska is located in western Polk County, approximately 90 miles (140 km) north of Houston, on a peninsula extending into Lake Livingston. According to the United States Census Bureau, the city has a total area of 5.35 square miles (13.9 km^{2}), of which 5.32 square miles (13.8 km^{2}) is land and 0.02 square miles (0.052 km^{2}) is water.

The city lies within the Piney Woods of East Texas, a region of dense pine and hardwood forest.

=== Lake Livingston ===
Lake Livingston, impounded on the Trinity River and completed in 1968, is the defining geographic feature of the area. The reservoir covers approximately 83,000 acres (340 km^{2}), has more than 450 miles (720 km) of shoreline, and serves as a major water supply for the Houston region.

== Demographics ==
Historical population
Census	Pop.	Note	%±
1990	728		—
2000	1,174		61.3%
2010	1,764		50.3%
2020	3,020		71.2%
U.S. Decennial Census

Before incorporation, the community's population peaked at roughly 2,000 during the sawmill boom around 1908, declined to about 1,250 by 1925, and reached a low of approximately eighty residents by the late 1940s.

=== 2020 census ===
As of the 2020 census, there were 3,020 people, 1,251 households, and 809 families residing in the city.

Racial composition as of the 2020 census
Race	Number	Percent
White	2,547	84.3%
Black or African American	90	3.0%
American Indian and Alaska Native	25	0.8%
Asian	21	0.7%
Native Hawaiian and Other Pacific Islander	1	0.0%
Some other race	89	2.9%
Two or more races	247	8.2%
Hispanic or Latino (of any race)	216	7.2%

The median age was 47.4 years. 20.7% of residents were under the age of 18 and 24.6% were 65 or older. For every 100 females there were 96.9 males. The Census Bureau classified all of the city's residents as rural.

Of 1,251 households, 27.2% included children under 18, and 45.2% were married-couple households. About 29.3% of households were made up of individuals, and 15.4% had someone living alone aged 65 or older. There were 1,694 housing units, of which 26.2% were vacant.

== Government ==
Onalaska is a General Law Type A municipality. Under the city's code of ordinances, the governing body consists of a mayor and five council members, all elected at large to staggered two-year terms. The council appoints a city administrator, who oversees daily operations, along with the municipal judge.

Elected officials, as of July 2026
Office	Officeholder	Last elected
Mayor	Oz Canel	2026
Council member (at large)	Zachary Davies	2025
Council member (at large)	Shirley Gilmore	2025
Council member (at large)	Howard A. Smith	2025
Council member (at large)	Kathy Black Lott	2026
Council member (at large)	Traci Dennison	2026

In the general election of May 2, 2026, Canel was elected mayor with 53 percent of the vote, defeating the incumbent, James W. Arnett. Lott retained her council seat and Dennison was elected to the other seat contested at that election.

The Onalaska Municipal Court handles Class C misdemeanors, traffic offenses, and violations of city ordinances; the municipal judge is appointed by the council.

Law enforcement is provided by the Onalaska Police Department, and fire protection and emergency medical response by the Onalaska Volunteer Fire Department, which also performs water rescues on Lake Livingston.

=== Municipal finance ===
The city's fiscal year runs from October 1 to September 30. The budget for fiscal year 2025–2026 was adopted by the city council on September 9, 2025, under Ordinance No. 464.

The approved general fund budget provided for expenditures of about $2.66 million, against approximately $1.77 million in tax revenue. The largest single revenue sources were sales tax ($850,000) and ad valorem property tax ($670,000), followed by franchise taxes on electric, sanitation, cable, and telephone service. Separate funds provided roughly $1.04 million for the police department, $790,800 for the fire department, $343,000 for the municipal court, $319,000 for dispatch, and $90,000 for the public library.

The adopted property tax rate for 2025–2026 was $0.248971 per $100 of valuation, up from $0.233000 the previous year. The budget document stated that it would raise $94,584 more in property tax revenue than the preceding year's budget, an increase of 18.72 percent, of which $30,354 was attributable to new property added to the tax roll. The city reported no debt obligation secured by property taxes.

== Economy ==
The city's economy is closely tied to Lake Livingston, with recreation and tourism — boating, fishing, and camping — supporting local restaurants, retail, and services, alongside a substantial retiree population.

== Education ==
Onalaska is served by the Onalaska Independent School District, which operates Onalaska Elementary School (grades pre-K–6) and Onalaska Junior/Senior High School (grades 7–12). As of the 2023–2024 school year the district enrolled approximately 1,242 students.

In January 2023 the district's board of trustees approved a transition to a four-day school week, effective from the 2023–2024 school year. In May 2024 voters approved a $42 million bond to build a new high school on FM 3459; once complete, the existing junior/senior high building is expected to become a middle school. The new campus is projected to open in 2027.

== Infrastructure ==
=== Transportation ===
U.S. Highway 190 crosses Polk County and connects Onalaska with Livingston and Huntsville. Farm to Market Road 356 passes through the city and links it to U.S. 190 near the Trinity River.

=== Utilities ===
Water and sewer service is provided principally by the Onalaska Water and Gas Supply Corporation and the Polk County Fresh Water Supply District; properties outside the city limits may use private septic systems. Electricity is supplied by Sam Houston Electric Cooperative. Solid waste collection within the city is contracted to Pro Star Waste, which began service under a municipal contract effective May 1, 2025.

Internet and telephone service is available from Eastex Telephone Cooperative, which offers fiber and legacy DSL service, and from Optimum (formerly Suddenlink), which provides cable internet and television.

== Severe weather ==
Onalaska has been struck by two significant tornadoes. On May 1, 1967, an F2 tornado moved through the town, unroofing a combined store and post office and injuring two people.

On the evening of April 22, 2020, a large EF3 wedge tornado struck Onalaska as part of the tornado outbreak of April 21–23, 2020. The tornado touched down on the shore of Lake Livingston, crossed the reservoir, and moved through the city, travelling roughly 30 miles (48 km) and reaching a width of about two-thirds of a mile at peak strength. Maximum winds of 140 miles per hour (230 km/h) were recorded in the Paradise Acres subdivision. Three people were killed and 33 injured, all within Onalaska; 291 homes were damaged and 46 destroyed. The National Weather Service described it as the deadliest single tornado in the Houston/Galveston forecast area since 1987.

The tornado struck while the community was also under a disaster declaration for the COVID-19 pandemic, and Polk County officials issued a second declaration for the storm. The area was subsequently found not to qualify for individual FEMA disaster assistance.

In July 2024, Onalaska issued a local disaster declaration in connection with Hurricane Beryl; a federal major disaster declaration for Texas followed later that month.

== Aircraft registration and the "Broken Trust" investigation ==
Although Onalaska has no airport, it became the registered address of more than a thousand aircraft, a distinction that drew national investigative scrutiny and ultimately contributed to a change in federal aviation law.

Federal rules require an aircraft registered in the United States to be owned by a U.S. citizen or permanent resident, but permit foreign nationals to obtain U.S. registration by placing the aircraft in a trust administered by an American trustee. Prosecutors later noted that the resulting "N" tail number was prized because foreign authorities were less likely to inspect or force down an American-registered aircraft. Aircraft Guaranty Corporation, a trust company founded in Onalaska decades earlier, used two local post office boxes as the registered address for its clients' planes; by the time of the investigation the firm's operations had moved to Oklahoma City, though employees continued to collect mail in Onalaska.

In February 2019 the Dallas television station WFAA reported, in an investigative series titled Broken Trust, that more than 1,000 aircraft were registered to those two post office boxes — more than were registered in Seattle, San Antonio, San Diego, or New York City — in a town of roughly 3,000 people with no airfield. The company's trust arrangements had drawn earlier scrutiny: a 2017 The Boston Globe Spotlight investigation linked an Aircraft Guaranty–registered plane, flown by a convicted drug trafficker, to a crash into a Venezuelan home that killed those aboard and inside.

Federal prosecutors credited the WFAA reporting with prompting a criminal investigation. In 2021 a federal grand jury in the Eastern District of Texas unsealed indictments charging eight people with drug-related offenses, and alleging that the trust structure had been used to place U.S.-registered aircraft in the hands of drug traffickers alongside a large-scale Ponzi scheme built on fictitious aircraft sales. Debra Mercer-Erwin, who had acquired Aircraft Guaranty in the mid-2010s, was convicted at a federal trial in 2023 and sentenced to 16 years in prison for drug smuggling and money laundering. A co-defendant, Federico Machado, fled to Argentina and contested extradition, denying the allegations against him; he had not been convicted as of 2026.

Witnesses testified that air trafficking of cocaine in Central America fell sharply following the indictments. In 2024 U.S. Senator Chuck Grassley cited the Onalaska findings in a report to Congress titled "National Security Assessment: Criminal Exploitation of the Federal Aviation Administration Registry." Subsequent federal legislation required the Federal Aviation Administration to collect and verify identifying information for aircraft registrants and for entities holding more than a 25% interest in an aircraft. Records introduced at the 2023 trial later became the basis of a political controversy in Argentina.

== See also ==
- Lake Livingston
- Polk County, Texas
- Waco, Beaumont, Trinity and Sabine Railway
