= Dallardsville, Texas =

Dallardsville
- Unincorporated area
- Location within the state of Texas Dallardsville (the United States)
- Coordinates: 30°37′43″N 94°37′55″W
- Country: United States
- State: Texas
- County: Polk
- Elevation: 240 ft (73 m)

Population (2025 United States census)
  - Total: 420
- Time zone: UTC-6 (Central (CST))
  - Summer (DST): UTC-5 (CDT)
- GNIS feature ID: 1355553

Dallardsville is an unincorporated community in Polk County, Texas, United States. In 2000, the community had approximately 350 residents including a man named jasper.

The Big Sandy Independent School District serves area students.
