= Livingston Independent School District =

School district in Texas, United States

Location
- portions of Polk County, Texas ESC Region 6 United States

District information
- Type: Public
- Motto: Crayons to Careers
- Grades: Pre-K through 12
- Superintendent: Dr. Brent Hawkins
- NCES District ID: 4827780

Students and staff
- Students: 4,052 (2023–2024)
- Teachers: 253.51 (on an FTE basis) (2023–2024)
- Staff: 266.76 (on an FTE basis) (2023–2024)
- Student–teacher ratio: 15.98 (2023–2024)
- Athletic conference: UIL Class AAAA
- District mascot: Lion
- Colors: Green and white

Other information
- Website: www.livingstonisd.com

Livingston Independent School District (LISD) is a public school district based in Livingston, Texas, United States. LISD celebrated its 100th anniversary on April 26, 2008. In addition to Livingston, the district also serves the census-designated places of Indian Springs and West Livingston, a portion of the Big Thicket Lake Estates CDP, and a portion of the community of Blanchard.

In 2009, the school district was rated "academically acceptable" by the Texas Education Agency.

== Schools ==
- Livingston High School (grades 9-12)
- Livingston Junior High School (grades 6-8)
- Livingston Creekside Elementary (grades 1-5)
- Pine Ridge Primary School (prekindergarten and kindergarten)
- Timber Creek Elementary School (grades 1-5)
- Cedar Grove Elementary School (grades 1-5)
- Livingston High School Academy (for high school students at risk of dropping out)
- Polk County Alternative Education Program

== Sports championships ==
High-school football:

- Livingston Dunbar (1A-PVIL) 1953
- Livingston Dunbar (1A-PVIL) 1954
- Livingston Dunbar (1A-PVIL) 1958
- Livingston Dunbar (1A-PVIL) runner-up 1959

High school basketball:

- Livingston High (all schools in one division) 1939
- Livingston Dunbar (1A-PVIL) runner-up 1952
