= Onalaska Independent School District =

School district in Texas, United States

Address
- 134 North FM 356 Onalaska, Texas, 77360; United States

District information
- Type: Public
- Grades: PK–12
- Schools: 2
- NCES District ID: 4833690

Students and staff
- Students: 1,242 (2023–2024)
- Teachers: 87.66 (on an FTE basis) (2023–2024)
- Staff: 110.13 (on an FTE basis) (2023–2024)
- Student–teacher ratio: 14.17 (2023–2024)

Other information
- Website: www.onalaskaisd.net

Onalaska Independent School District is a public school district based in Onalaska, Texas, United States. In addition to Onalaska, the district also serves a portion of the unincorporated community of Blanchard.

In 2009, the school district was rated "academically acceptable" by the Texas Education Agency.

== Schools ==
- Onalaska Junior/Senior High School (grades 7-12)
- Onalaska Elementary School (prekindergarten-grade 6)
