= Leggett Independent School District =

School district in Texas

Address
- 254 East FM 942 Livingston, Texas, 77351; United States

District information
- Type: Public
- Grades: PK–12
- Schools: 2
- NCES District ID: 4827120

Students and staff
- Students: 199 (2023–2024)
- Teachers: 15.43 (on an FTE basis) (2023–2024)
- Staff: 19.94 (on an FTE basis) (2023–2024)
- Student–teacher ratio: 12.90 (2023–2024)

Other information
- Website: www.leggettisd.net

Leggett Independent School District is a public school district based in the community of Leggett, Texas (USA). In addition to the community of Leggett, Leggett ISD also serves some of the town of Seven Oaks.

The district has two campuses - Leggett High (Grades 7-12) and Leggett Elementary (Grades PK-6).

In 2009, the school district was rated "academically acceptable" by the Texas Education Agency.
