= Leggett, Texas =

Unincorporated community in Polk County, Texas

Leggett
- Unincorporated area
- Location within the state of Texas Leggett (the United States)
- Coordinates: 30°49′05″N 94°52′14″W
- Country: United States
- State: Texas
- County: Polk

Population (2000)
  - Total: 500
- Time zone: UTC-6 (Central (CST))
  - Summer (DST): UTC-5 (CDT)
- GNIS feature ID: 1361059

Leggett is an unincorporated community in Polk County, Texas, United States. It is located at the junction of U.S. Highway 59 (future Interstate 69) and Farm to Market Road 942. As of 2000, the community had about 500 residents.

The Leggett Independent School District serves area students.

== History ==
In 1919, Leggett, described as a sundown town, a white council set a curfew for blacks, banned black fraternal and church meetings, and forbade African Americans from visiting the railroad station or the post office.

== Climate ==
The climate in this area is characterized by hot, humid summers and generally mild to cool winters. According to the Köppen climate classification, Leggett has a humid subtropical climate (Cfa on climate maps).

== See also ==
- List of sundown towns in the United States
