= Big Sandy Independent School District (Polk County, Texas) =

School district in Texas, United States

Location
- Dallardsville, Texas ESC Region 6 USA
- Coordinates: 30°37′44″N 94°38′00″W

District information
- Type: Independent school district
- Grades: Pre-K through 12
- Superintendent: Eric Carpenter
- Schools: 1
- NCES District ID: 4810170

Students and staff
- Students: 524 (2023–2024)
- Teachers: 41.85 (on an FTE basis) (2023–2024)
- Staff: 44.97 (on an FTE basis) (2023–2024)
- Student–teacher ratio: 12.52 (2023–2024)
- Athletic conference: UIL Class 2A Basketball Division I
- District mascot: Wildcats
- Colors: Purple, White

Other information
- TEA District Accountability Rating for 2011: Academically Acceptable
- Website: www.bigsandyisd.net

Big Sandy Independent School District is a public school district based in the community of Dallardsville, Texas (USA). The district consists of one school serving all grades.

== Finances ==
As of the 2010–2011 school year, the appraised valuation of property in the district was $278,305,000. The maintenance tax rate was $0.104 and the bond tax rate was $0.016 per $100 of appraised valuation.

== Academic achievement ==
In 2011, the school district was rated "academically acceptable" by the Texas Education Agency.

== See also ==
- List of school districts in Texas
