= Corrigan, Texas =

Corrigan
- Town
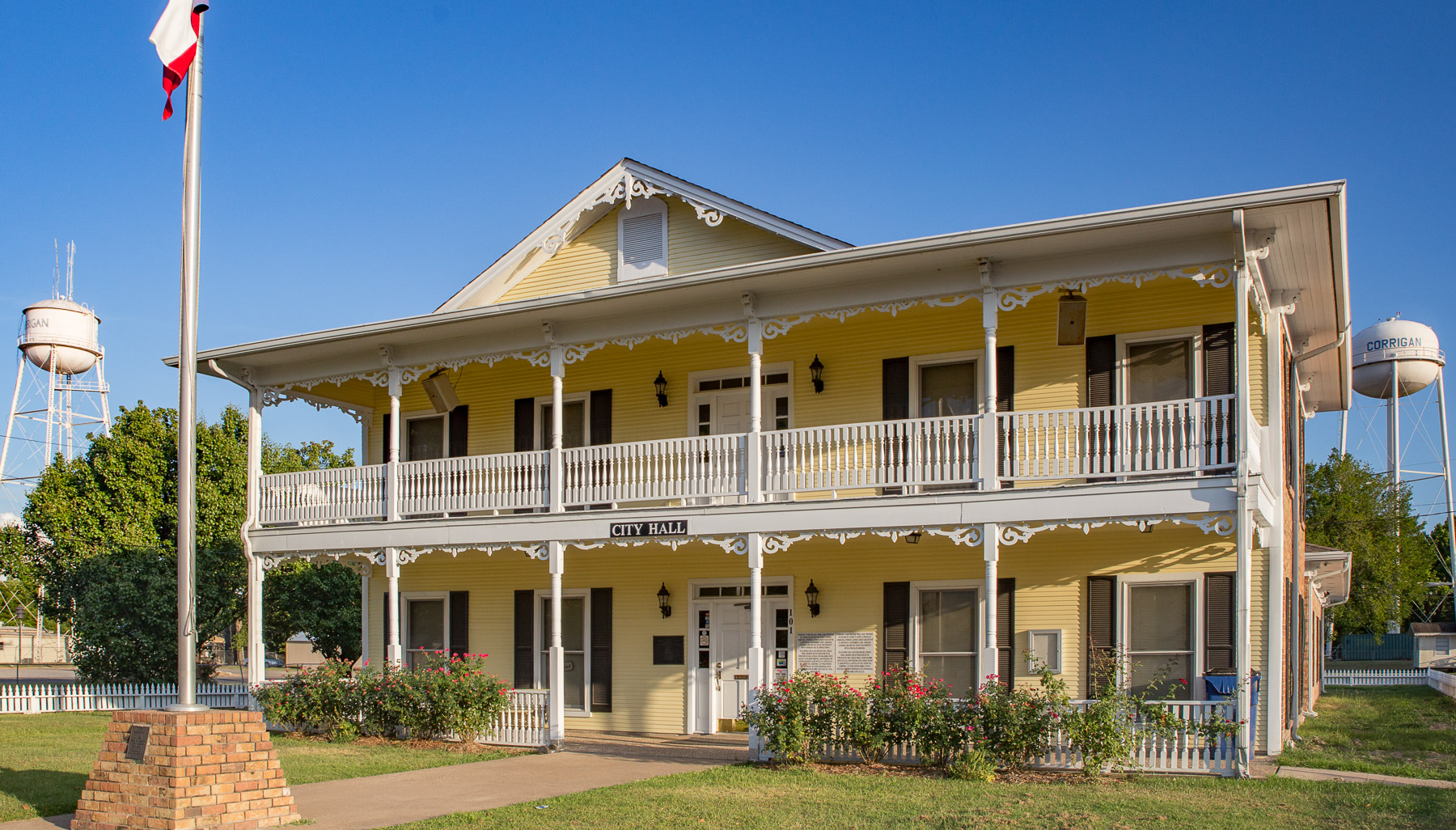
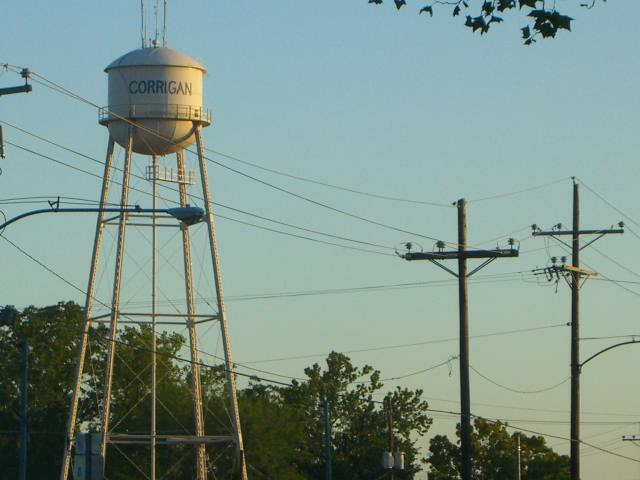
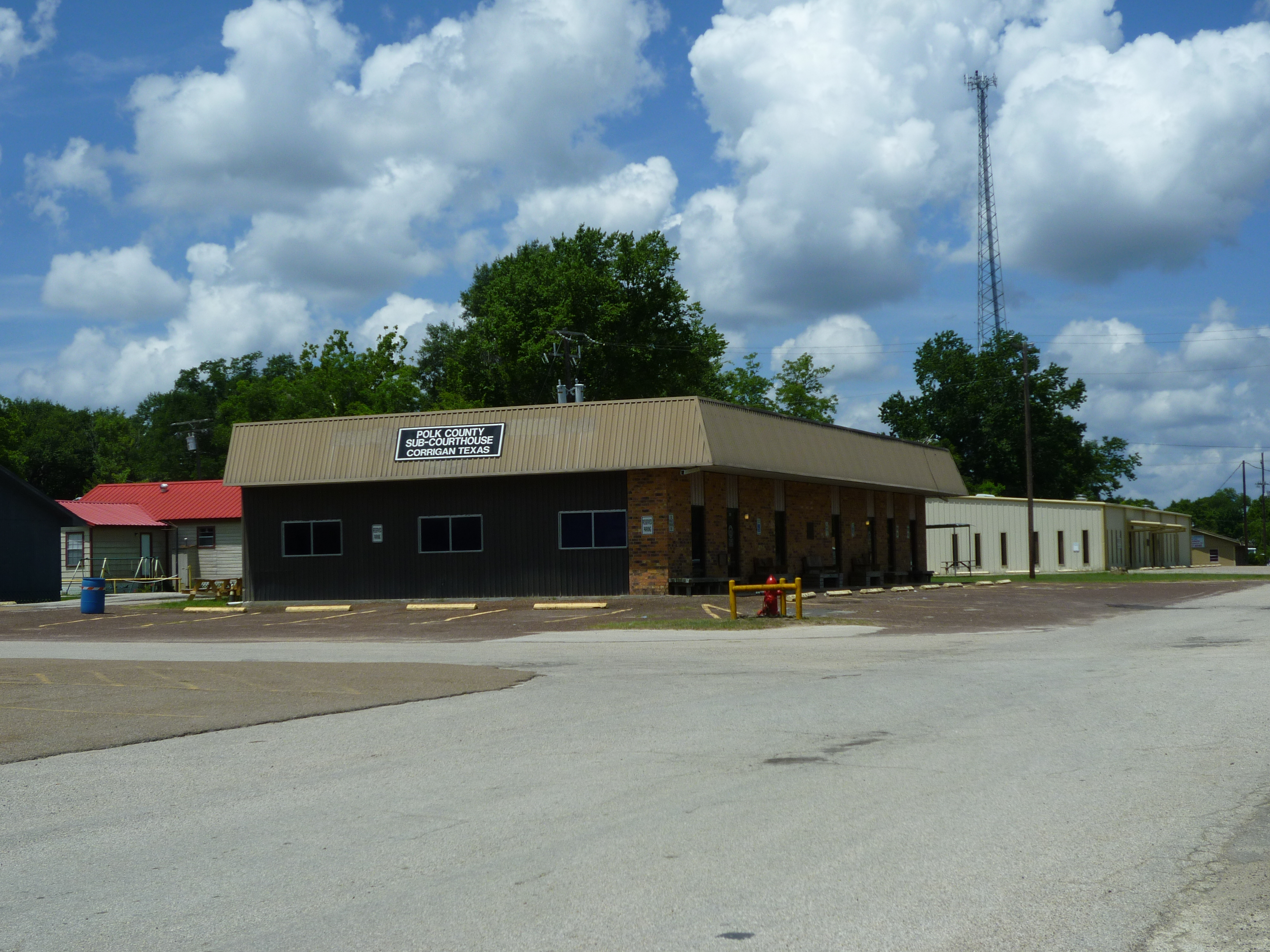
- Clockwise from top: Corrigan City Hall; Polk County Subcourthouse; and the city water tower

- Seal

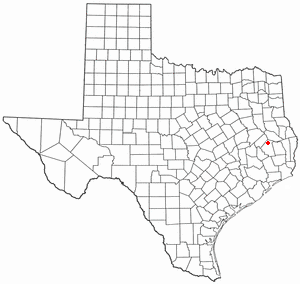
- Location of Corrigan, Texas

- Coordinates: 31°00′20″N 94°49′39″W
- Country: United States
- State: Texas
- County: Polk
- Founded: 1881; 145 years ago
- Incorporated: 1938; 88 years ago

Government
  - Type: Council-manager

Area
  - Total: 2.30 sq mi (5.95 km^{2})
  - Land: 2.30 sq mi (5.95 km^{2})
  - Water: 0 sq mi (0.00 km^{2})
- Elevation: 233 ft (71 m)

Population (2020)
  - Total: 1,477
  - Density: 701.6/sq mi (270.88/km^{2})
- Time zone: UTC-6 (Central (CST))
  - Summer (DST): UTC-5 (CDT)
- ZIP code: 75939
- Area code: 936
- FIPS code: 48-17036
- GNIS feature ID: 2413246
- Website: www.cityofcorrigan.com

Corrigan is a town in north central Polk County, Texas, United States. It is located along U.S. Highway 59, about 100 miles from Houston. Its population was 1,477 in the 2020 census.

== Background ==
Corrigan largely emerged when the Houston East and West Texas Railway was completed in 1881; however, the area had seen some establishment of mills and farms prior to the railroad. The town was named Corrigan after Pat Corrigan, the conductor of the first train to pass through the newly built railway in the area. In the years following, the timber industry boomed in Corrigan due to the large pine trees native to the area and access to the railroad. By the year 1882, 17 sawmills were in the Corrigan area. The timber industry led to churches, stores, hotels, gins, and other businesses opening in Corrigan. In 1883, a post office opened. The Corrigan economy began to diversify, which helped the community survive economic downturns that happened periodically in the timber industry. However, the timber industry remained at the core of the Corrigan economy and shaped many of the Corrigan’s social structures.

In 2000, 114 businesses were in Corrigan. The town has a reputation for being a speed trap, and an analysis by the Houston Chronicle of Texas traffic stop data found the Corrigan Police Department to be among the most aggressive at enforcing traffic laws in the state, with the town's 12 police officers issuing over 8,100 citations in 2020.

== Geography ==
According to the United States Census Bureau, the town has a total area of 1.8 sq mi (4.7 km^{2}), all land.

=== Climate ===
The climate in this area is characterized by hot, humid summers and generally mild to cool winters. According to the Köppen climate classification, Corrigan has a humid subtropical climate, Cfa on climate maps.

== Demographics ==
Historical population
| Census | Pop. | Note | %± |
|---|---|---|---|
| 1890 | 298 | | — |
| 1940 | 1,402 | | — |
| 1950 | 1,417 | | 1.1% |
| 1960 | 986 | | −30.4% |
| 1970 | 1,304 | | 32.3% |
| 1980 | 1,770 | | 35.7% |
| 1990 | 1,764 | | −0.3% |
| 2000 | 1,721 | | −2.4% |
| 2010 | 1,595 | | −7.3% |
| 2020 | 1,477 | | −7.4% |
U.S. Decennial Census

Corrigan racial composition as of 2020 (NH = Non-Hispanic) (Note: Note: the US Census treats Hispanic/Latino as an ethnic category. This table excludes Latinos from the racial categories and assigns them to a separate category. Hispanics/Latinos can be of any race.)
| Race | Number | Percentage |
|---|---|---|
| White (NH) | 459 | 31.08% |
| Black or African American (NH) | 578 | 39.13% |
| Native American or Alaska Native (NH) | 3 | 0.2% |
| Asian (NH) | 12 | 0.81% |
| Mixed/multiracial (NH) | 50 | 3.39% |
| Hispanic or Latino | 375 | 25.39% |
| Total | 1,477 | |

As of the 2020 United States census, 1,477 people, 677 households, and 444 families lived in the town.

As of the census of 2000, 1,721 people, 630 households, and 437 families were residing in the town. The estimated population in 2018 was 1,604. The population density was 934.9 people/sq mi (361.1/km^{2}). The 734 housing units averaged 398.7/sq mi (154.0/km^{2}). The racial makeup of the town was 48.11% White, 42.18% African American, 0.23% Native American, 8.83% from other races, and 0.64% from two or more races. Hispanics or Latinos of any race were 14.93% of the population.

=== Households ===
Of the 630 households, 37.6% had children under 18 living with them, 40.3% were married couples living together, 24.6% had a female householder with no husband present, and 30.6% were not families. About 28.1% of all households were made up of individuals, and 15.6% had someone living alone who was 65 or older. The average household size was 2.63, and the average family size was 3.23.

In the town, the age distribution was 31.3% under 18, 10.9% from 18 to 24, 23.4% from 25 to 44, 18.1% from 45 to 64, and 16.3% who were 65 or older. The median age was 32 years. For every 100 females, there were 84.5 males. For every 100 females age 18 and over, there were 73.7 males.

=== Income ===
The median income for a household in the town was $18,980, and for a family was $24,830. Males had a median income of $30,144 versus $19,881 for females. The per capita income for the town was $10,794. About 30.3% of families and 31.5% of the population were below the poverty line, including 42.1% of those under age 18 and 30.8% of those age 65 or over.

== Education ==
The Town of Corrigan is served by the Corrigan-Camden Independent School District, which operates Corrigan-Camden High School.

The Texas Legislature designated Polk County as being in the boundary of Angelina College's district.
