= Corrigan-Camden Independent School District =

School district in Texas, United States

Address
- 504 South Home Street ESC Region 6 Corrigan, Texas, 75939; United States
- Coordinates: 30.9916°N 94.8264°W

District information
- Type: Public
- Grades: PK–12
- Superintendent: Brian Aiken
- Schools: 3
- NCES District ID: 4815300

Students and staff
- Students: 836 (2023–2024)
- Teachers: 71.59 (on an FTE basis) (2023–2024)
- Staff: 95.89 (on an FTE basis) (2023–2024)
- Student–teacher ratio: 11.68 (2023–2024)
- Athletic conference: UIL Class 2A
- Colors: White & Royal Blue

Other information
- Website: www.ccisdtx.com

Corrigan-Camden Independent School District is a public school district based in Corrigan, Texas, United States. In 2022, the school district was given an "A" rating by the Texas Education Agency.

Corrigan-Camden is located between Lufkin and Livingston. The district includes the municipality of Corrigan, the census-designated place of Pleasant Hill, and a portion of the municipality of Seven Oaks.

C-CISD was one of the first schools in Texas to offer a four-day instructional week for its staff and students; the district made the change in fall 2020.

C-CISD is led by Brian Aiken, superintendent. Karis Watson is the high school principal, Tina Slaten is the junior high principal, and Laci Murphy is the elementary principal. Corrigan-Camden has an athletic program, with Brette Ratliff as athletic director and Javier Perez as girls' athletic coordinator.

== Schools ==
- Corrigan-Camden High School (grades 9–12)
- Corrigan-Camden Junior High School (grades 6–8)
- Corrigan-Camden Elementary School (prekindergarten-grade 5)
