= KVLL-FM =

Coordinates: 31.113°N 94.809°W

- Wells, Texas; United States
- Broadcast area: Lufkin–Nacogdoches
- Frequency: 94.7 MHz
- Branding: Fun 94.7

Programming
- Language: English
- Format: Classic hits

Ownership
- Owner: Townsquare Media; (Townsquare License, LLC)
- Sister stations: KYKS; KAFX-FM; KSFA; KTBQ

History
- First air date: November 12, 1993; 32 years ago (in Woodville)
- Last air date: March 25, 2025; 10 months ago
- Call sign meaning: Woodville (former city of license)

Technical information
- Licensing authority: FCC
- Facility ID: 68130
- Class: C2
- ERP: 50,000 watts
- HAAT: 117 m (384 ft)

Links
- Public license information: Public file; LMS
- Webcast: Listen live
- Website: fun947.com

KVLL-FM (94.7 MHz) was a radio station licensed to Wells, Texas, serving the Lufkin–Nacogdoches area of east Texas. The station was last owned by Townsquare Media.

KVLL-FM operated from 1993 until 2025. It offered a multitude of formats over the course of its existence, changing from adult contemporary to regional Mexican and then Spanish-language adult hits during the early 2020s; its final format, classic hits, debuted on January 4, 2024.

== History ==
KVLL-FM received its license to cover on November 12, 1993, after Trinity Valley Broadcasting Company received a permit to construct a 50 kilowatt Class C2 FM facility near Rockland, Texas. KVLL-FM was originally licensed to Woodville as the FM sister station to KVLL (1490 AM).

Trinity Valley Broadcasting Company sold KVLL and KVLL-FM to Radio Woodville, Inc. on November 20, 1998. Radio Woodville, Inc. resold KVLL-FM on May 3, 1999, to Yates Broadcasting. This occurred one month after KVLL was sold to Stargazer Broadcasting, Inc. effectively taking Radio Woodville out of the broadcasting industry.

Owned by Steven Yates, KVLL-FM was granted a minor modification in June 2002, moving KVLL-FM's transmitter site from Rockland to a site on U.S. Highway 59, south of Diboll. KVLL-FM received its license to cover, along with changing its city of license to Wells, on July 2, 2003.

Yates Broadcasting sold KVLL-FM to Gap Broadcasting Lufkin License, LLC. on December 13, 2007. The Gap cluster was subsequently acquired by Townsquare Media.

On February 10, 2020, KVLL-FM changed its format from adult contemporary as "My 94.7" to regional Mexican, branded as "La Mejor 94.7". On July 18, 2022, KVLL-FM changed its format to Spanish-language adult hits, branded as "Juan 94.7". On January 4, 2024, KVLL-FM changed its format to classic hits, branded as "Fun 94.7".

On March 25, 2025, Townsquare submitted an application to the Federal Communications Commission (FCC) to cancel the license for KVLL-FM, as part of an ongoing shutdown of underperforming stations.
