= KSML =

KSML may refer to:

- KSML (AM), a radio station (1260 AM) licensed to Diboll, Texas, United States
- KSML-FM, a radio station (101.9 FM) licensed to Huntington, Texas, United States
- Keskisuomalainen, Finnish newspaper
- KSML, the IATA code for Kosher airline meal
- KSML (Apache Kafka) is a framework that allows users to express a Kafka Streams topology as low-code YAML files
