= KYBI =

- Lufkin, Texas; United States
- Broadcast area: Lufkin-Nacogdoches
- Frequency: 100.1 MHz
- Branding: Y100

Programming
- Format: Country
- Affiliations: Citadel Media, Dial Global

Ownership
- Owner: Kasa Family Limited Partnership
- Sister stations: KSML-FM, KSML, KRBA

History
- First air date: July 27, 1978 (as 99.3 KDEY)
- Former call signs: KDEY (1978–1987); KUEZ (1987–2005)

Technical information
- Licensing authority: FCC
- Facility ID: 63327
- Class: C2
- ERP: 20,000 watts
- HAAT: 240.0 meters (787.4 ft)
- Transmitter coordinates: 31°20′5.00″N 94°40′10.00″W

Links
- Public license information: Public file; LMS
- Website: KYBI on Facebook

KYBI (100.1 FM) is a radio station broadcasting a country format. Licensed to Lufkin, Texas, United States, the station serves the Lufkin-Nacogdoches area. The station features programming from Citadel Media and Dial Global.

== History ==
KYBI was first proposed and requested by Darrell Yates, owner of KRBA, in October 1977. The request was granted by the Federal Communications Commission on December 19, 1977. The facility was granted the call letters KDEY, as a Class A with 1.9 kilowatts ERP, operating on 99.3 MHz, and was officially licensed on July 27, 1978.

The station changed its call sign to KUEZ on July 1, 1987. In January 2002, 99.3 KUEZ was granted a construction permit to change frequencies to the current 100.1 MHz, as to allow for construction of a new facility to be built south of Diboll, Texas using the 99.3 allocation. The new facility was constructed in 2005, and is currently in operation, licensed to Corrigan, Texas as KYTM.

On February 15, 2005, the move to 100.1 was granted a license to cover on its new operating channel, and changed its call sign to the current KYBI in the process, which was moved from sister station 101.9 (now KSML-FM).
