= KLFK =

KLFK may refer to:

- KLFK (FM), a radio station in Wells, Texas, United States
- The ICAO airport code for Angelina County Airport
