= KSPL =

KSPL may refer to:

- KSPL (FM), a radio station (90.9 FM) licensed to Kalispell, Montana, United States
- KSPL-LP, a low-power radio station (98.1 FM) licensed to John Day, Oregon, United States
- KAFX-FM, a radio station (95.5 FM) licensed to Diboll, Texas, that formerly held the callsign KSPL-FM
