= KFOX =

KFOX may refer to:

- KFOX-TV, a television station (channel 15, virtual 14) licensed to El Paso, Texas, United States
- KFOX (AM), a radio station (1650 AM) licensed to Torrance, California, United States
- KAFX-FM, a radio station (95.5 FM) licensed to Diboll, Texas, United States, known on the air as KFOX
- KBAY, a radio station (98.5 FM) licensed to San Jose, California, United States, known on the air as KFOX
  - KRBQ, a radio station (102.1 FM) licensed to San Francisco, California, United States, which simulcast KUFX from 2011 to 2014
- KFRN, a radio station (1280 AM) licensed to Long Beach, California, which originally held the KFOX calls until 1978 and was portrayed in the 1974 film Gone in 60 Seconds
- KKDZ, a radio station (1250 AM) licensed to Seattle, Washington, United States, which used the branding K-FOX from 1981 to 1993
- KDAY, a radio station (93.5 FM) licensed to Redondo Beach, California, which held the KFOX calls from the 1970s to 1999
