= Lufkin, Texas =

City in Texas, United States

Lufkin
- City
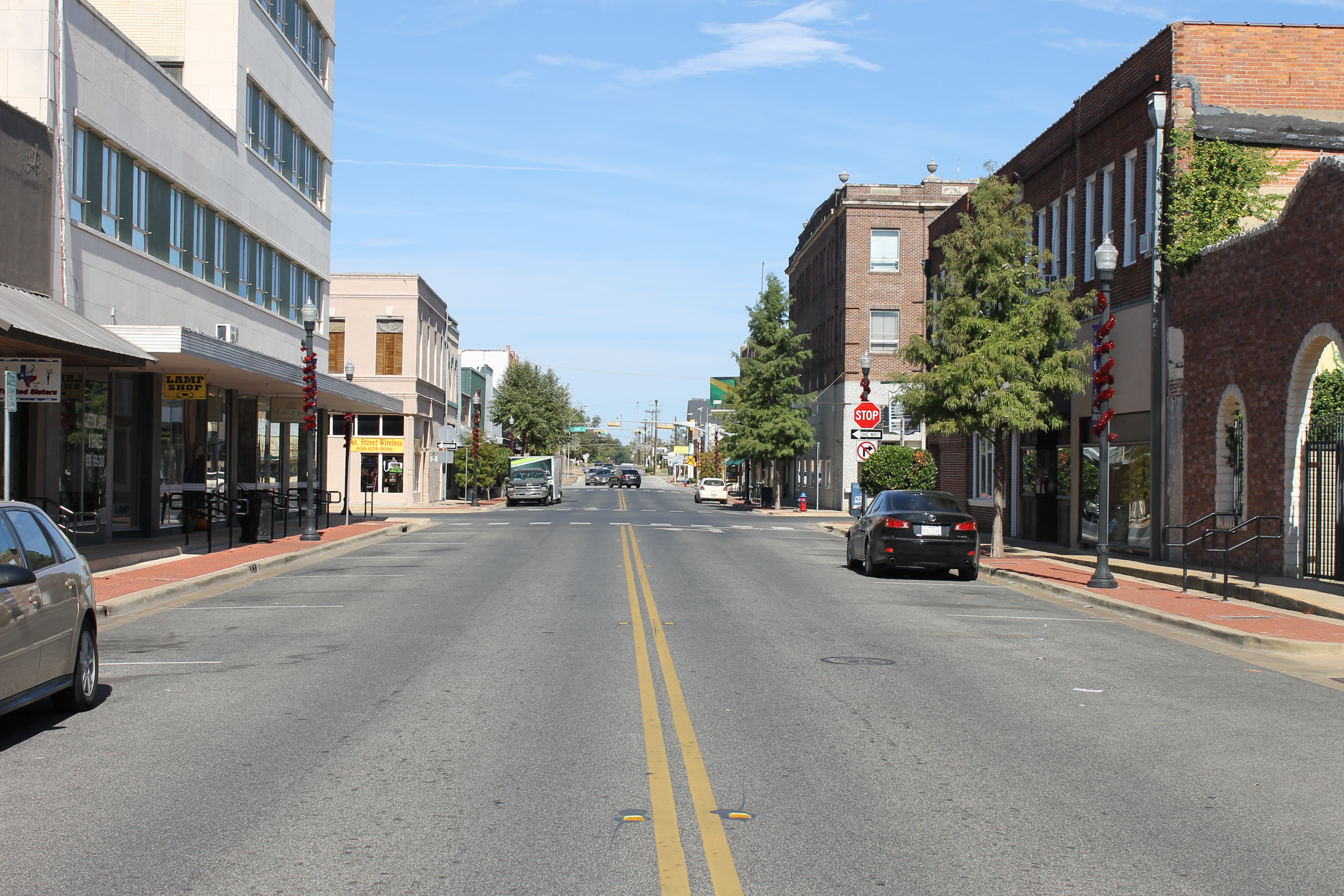
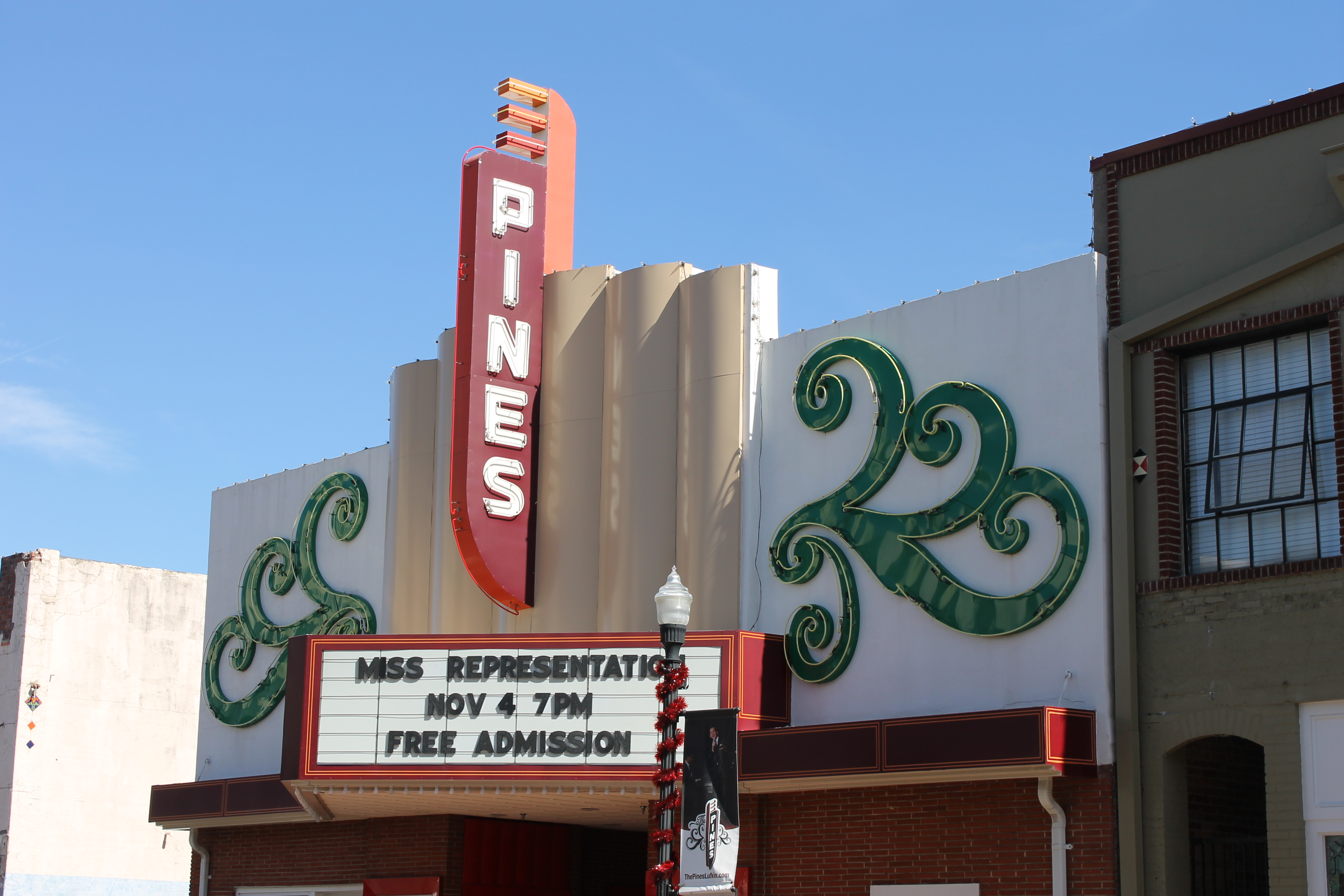
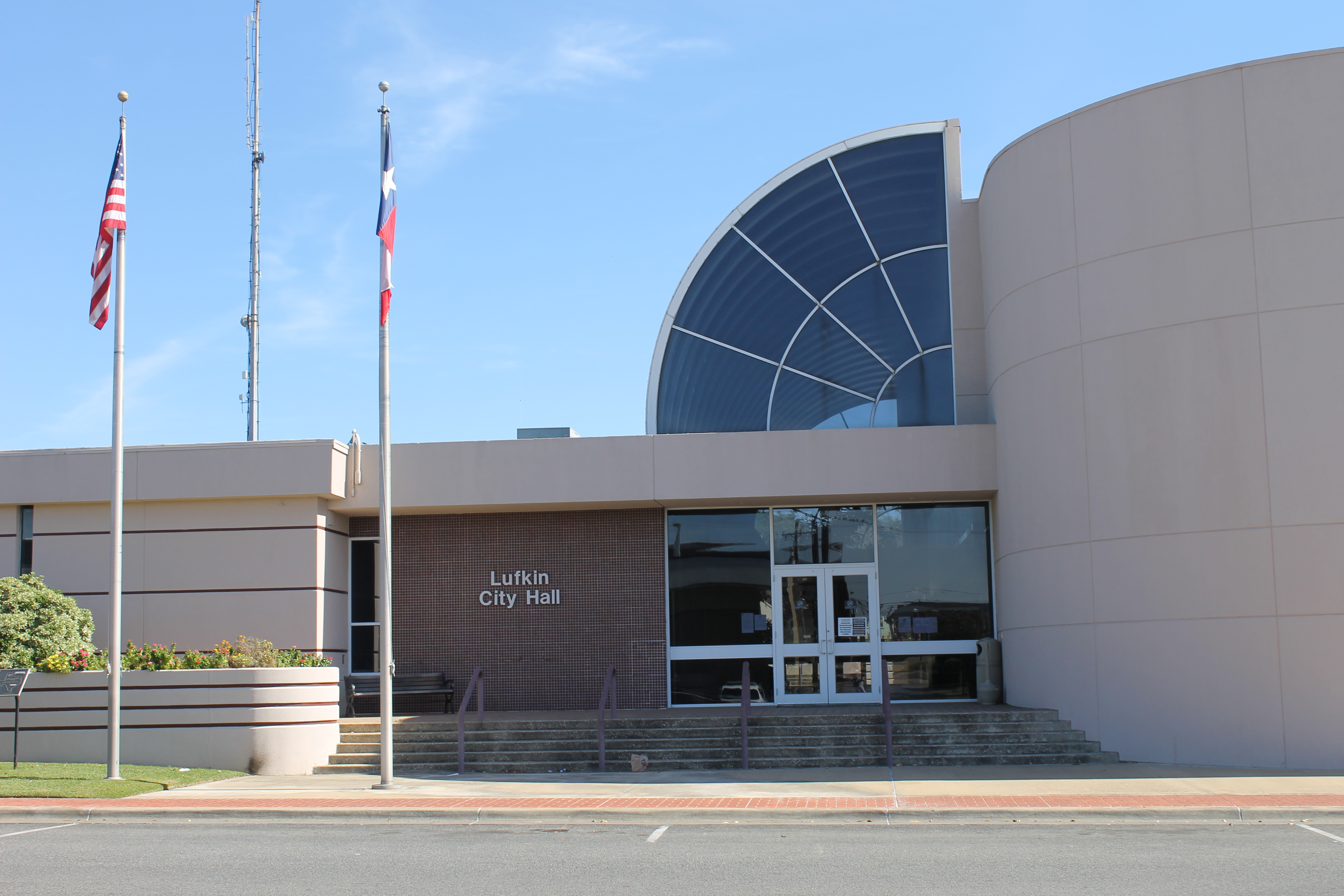
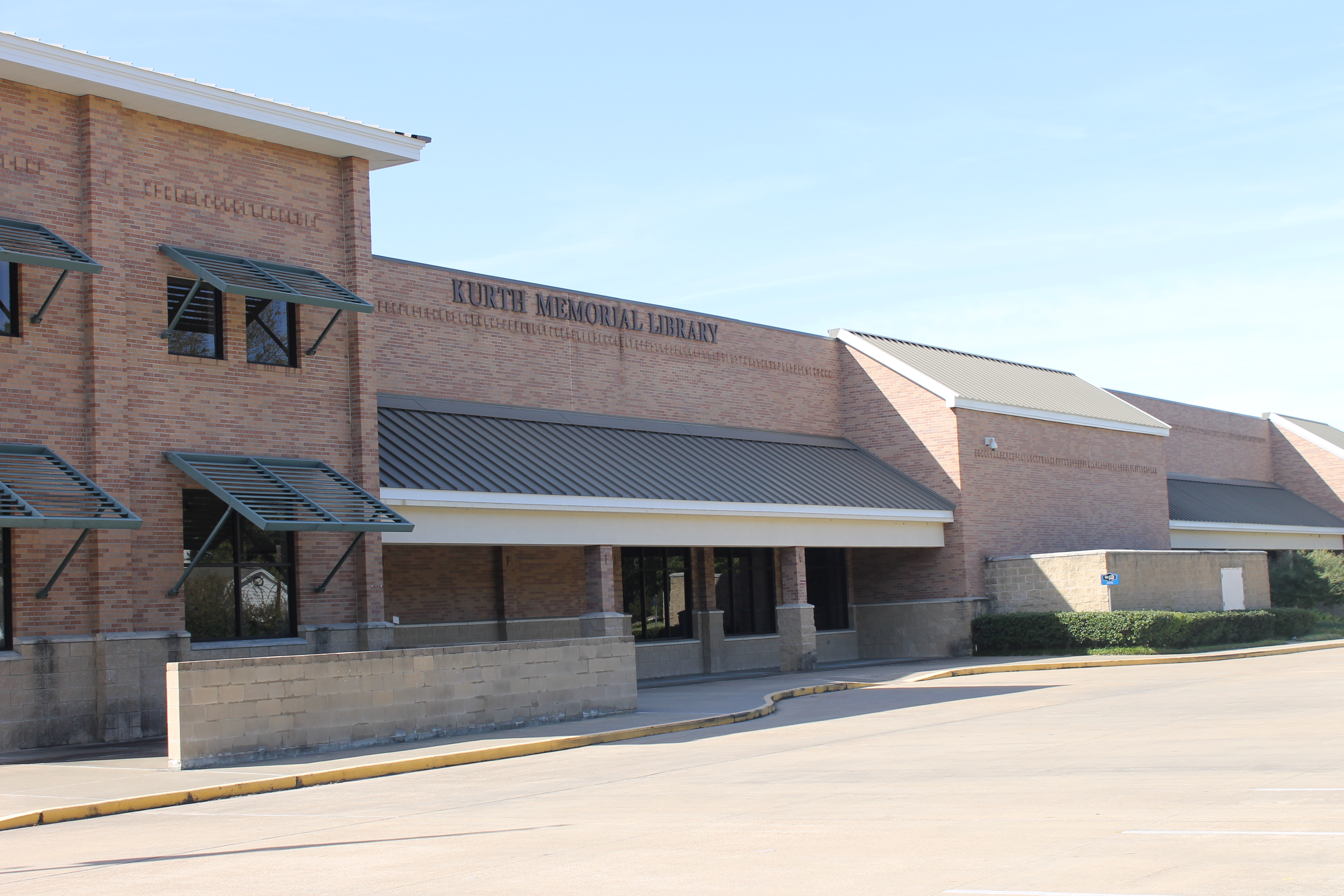
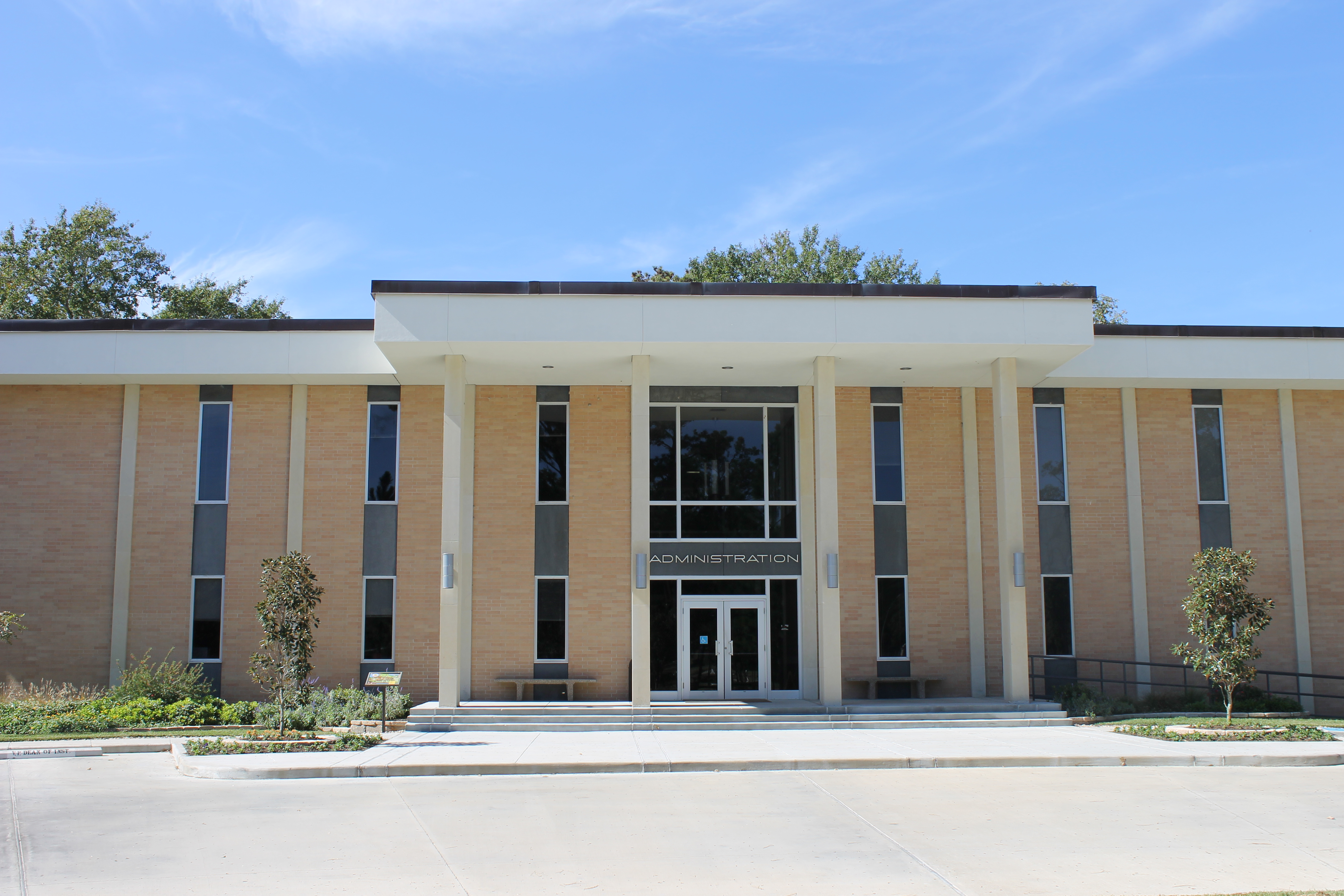
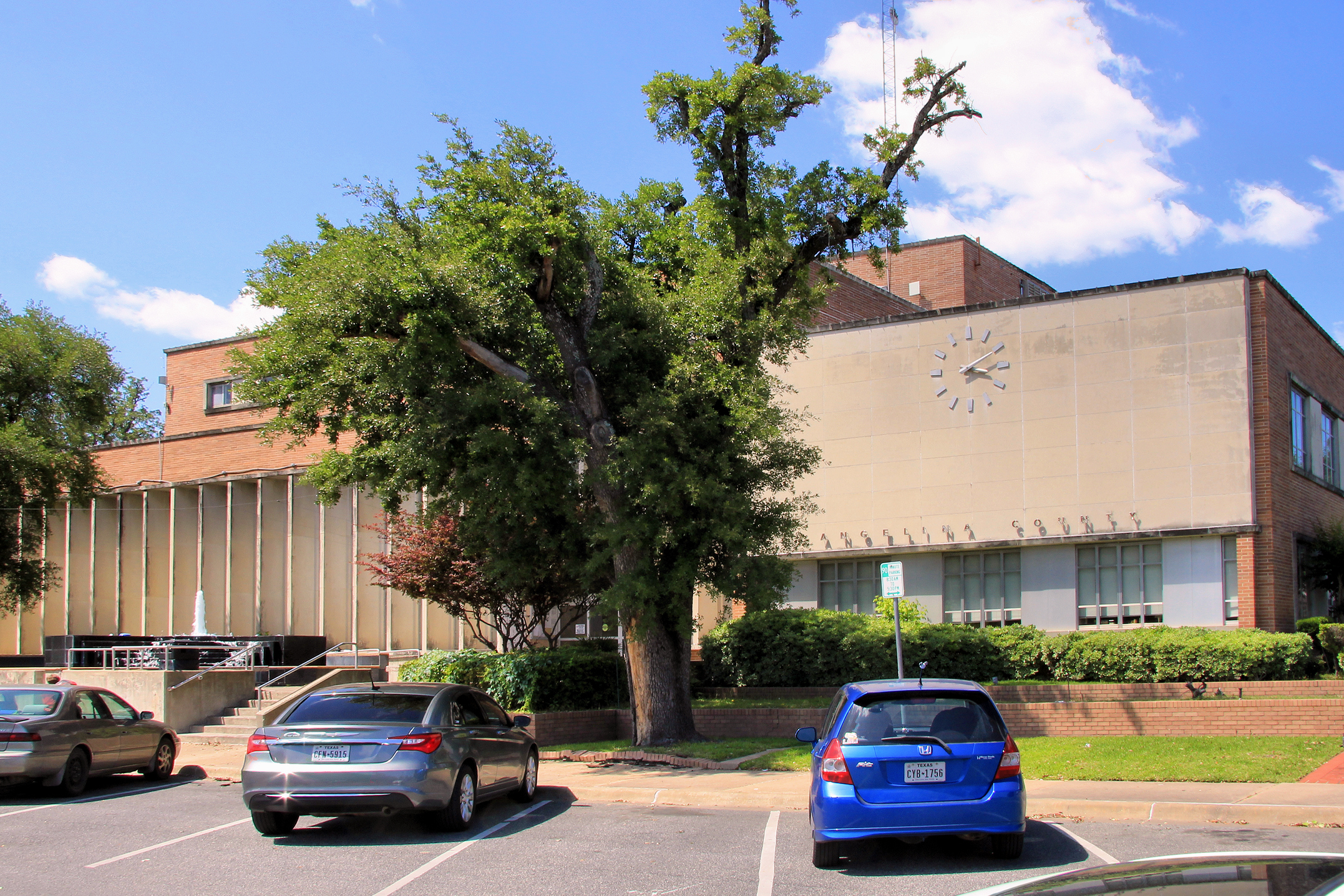
- Downtown Lufkin Pines Theater Lufkin City Hall Kurth Memorial Library Angelina College administration building Angelina County Courthouse

- Flag

- Location in Angelina County

- Location within Texas Location within the United States
- Coordinates: 31°20′18″N 94°43′45″W
- Country: United States
- State: Texas
- County: Angelina
- Founded: 1882
- Incorporated: October 15, 1890
- Named for: Abraham P. Lufkin

Government
  - Type: Council-manager
  - Mayor: Mark Hicks
  - City Council: Members: Angela Hobbs-Spencer; Robert Shankle; Kimberly Abeldt; Kim Ogden; Jimmy Ford; Adam Lowther
  - City Manager: Kevin Gee

Area
  - Total: 34.48 sq mi (89.30 km^{2})
  - Land: 34.21 sq mi (88.60 km^{2})
  - Water: 0.27 sq mi (0.71 km^{2})
- Elevation: 266 ft (81 m)

Population (2020)
  - Total: 34,143
  - Density: 998.1/sq mi (385.38/km^{2})
- Time zone: UTC−6 (Central (CST))
  - Summer (DST): UTC−5 (CDT)
- ZIP code: 75901, 75902, 75903, 75904, 75915
- Area code: 936
- FIPS code: 48-45072 exp
- GNIS feature ID: 2410895
- Website: cityoflufkin.com

Lufkin is the largest city in Angelina County, Texas, United States, and is the county seat. The city is situated in Deep East Texas and is 60 mi (97 km) west of the Texas–Louisiana state line. Its population is approximately 34,000 people as of 2024.

Lufkin was founded in 1884 and named for Abraham P. Lufkin. It originally served as a stop on the Houston, East and West Texas Railway. It was officially incorporated on October 15, 1890. Lufkin continued to serve as a stop on the railroad until 1890. Three businessmen founded Angelina Lumber Company, which led to much of the economic prosperity Lufkin later enjoyed. When the so-called "timber boom" came to an end, a new "golden era of expansion" began. Lufkin became more industrialized with the opening of Lufkin Industries and Southland Paper Mill. In the mid-1960s, a cultural expansion began, and improvements were made to education and the way of life, including museums and the opening of a new library.

The City of Lufkin has a council–manager government, with six city council members, a mayor, and a city manager. The Lufkin Independent School District encompasses most of Lufkin and operates almost all of the schools within Lufkin. Additionally, Angelina College, a community college, is located in Lufkin.

== History ==
=== Pre-Foundation ===
By 1820 Anglo settlers had started to arrive in the Angelina County. The Burris Family established themselves in the area. Before Lufkin was officially founded, a band of night riders allegedly lynched Jim Burris, John D. Gann, William Anglin, and another man for opposing the Confederate cause.

=== Railroad era 1882–1890 ===
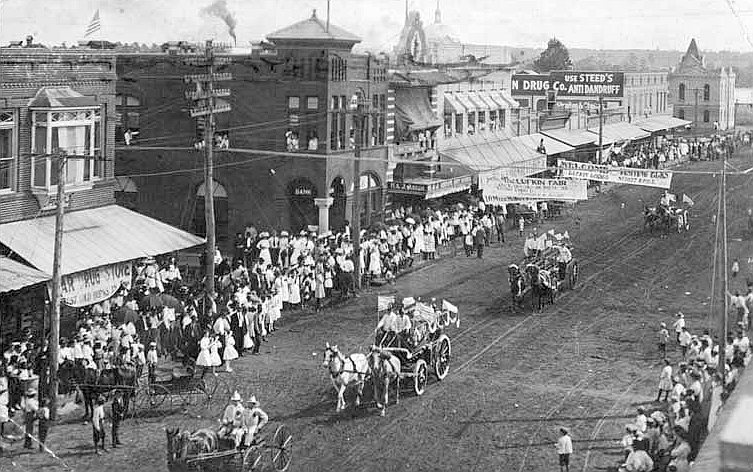
Parade in downtown Lufkin, c. 1911

The city was founded in 1882 as a stop on the Houston, East and West Texas Railway; it is named for Abraham P. Lufkin, a cotton merchant and Galveston city councilman. Lufkin was the father-in-law of Paul Bremond, president of the railroad, which developed the town. Lufkin continued to grow because of its proximity to the railroad and its lumber industry. The history of Lufkin can be divided into three main eras, the railroad era, the timber boom, and the golden era of expansion.

Old caboose at the Texas Forestry Museum, Lufkin, Texas

The railroad era lasted between 1882 and 1890. In 1881, the area that is now Lufkin was little more than a small settlement known as Denman Springs. A railroad surveying team began to plan a route through Angelina County, with a possible route through Homer, Texas, which at the time was the county seat. According to legend, the men in the surveying team began to get rowdy in the saloon in Homer, which led to their arrest. They paid their way out the next morning, but this infuriated the chief surveyor. He ordered the team for the rail line to bypass Homer and go by Denman Springs. Conveniently, the new route went through the property of Lafayette Denman and his son, Dr. A. M. Denman, who as the legend goes, had hosted the surveying team a few days earlier. This legend is most likely not true since the prospectus in 1879 already had the railroad planned to bypass Homer and go through the future site of Lufkin.

The railroad officially arrived in 1882, and the company began to advertise the sale of lots of land in Lufkin. During this time, many of the businesses and professionals from Homer began to relocate to Lufkin to be closer to the railroad. Some of the first stores in Lufkin included S. Abram's general store, Joseph Kerr's grocery and saddle shop, and W. H. Bonner's general store, all located on Cotton Square, which became the center of most economic activity in Lufkin. Behind the depot, which was on the cotton square, cotton was stored before being shipped on the railroad. The town continued to grow, and acquired a post office in 1882 with William A. Abney as postmaster. Soon after in 1883, a telegraph line was strung connecting Lufkin to Nacogdoches by telegraph. On October 15, 1890, the town was officially incorporated. The first mayor of Lufkin was J. M. Smith, who was the owner of Smith Hotel; he was elected on November 15, 1890. Even before the incorporation of Lufkin, the courthouse was sought to have been moved. By a vote in 1885, though, the courthouse remained in Homer. In November 1891, a fire of mysterious origin destroyed the courthouse in Homer. This prompted a petition from the citizens of Lufkin asking for a new election to be held to decide if the courthouse should be relocated to Lufkin. The election was held on January 2, 1892, and the citizens decided to relocate the courthouse to Lufkin.

=== 1890s, early 1900s, and timber boom ===
The timber boom lasted between 1890 and 1920. Three main lumbering families are recognized for much of the economic prosperity in Lufkin – the Kurths, the Hendersons, and the Wieners. Joseph H. Kurth Sr., was a German immigrant, who had operated a sawmill in Polk County, Texas. He moved to a small settlement north of Lufkin known as Keltys. In 1887, Kurth obtained a sawmill from Charles L. Kelty. He was soon joined by S. W. Henderson Sr., and Sam Wiener, both of Corrigan, Texas. In 1890, the men started the Angelina County Lumber Company. The company became the forerunner of the lumber industry in East Texas, and led to much of the economic prosperity in Lufkin. At the peak of the three families' activities, nearly a dozen sawmills and several other industries were operating.

In 1895, Walter Johnson was lynched for alleged rape, and in 1924, a mob attempted to lynch Booker T. Williams, but he escaped with the help of the local sheriff. Williams was ultimately executed by the state. By the 1920s, the Ku Klux Klan had established a Klavern in Lufkin. In September 1922, over 1000 klansmen gathered in public in front of 5000 spectators in an initiation ceremony. Large parades for the Klan were held throughout the 1920s.

In May 1932, Clyde Barrow and Bonnie Parker robbed a gas station in Lufkin and stole a car with a child sleeping in the backseat.

=== Golden era of expansion 1938–1945 ===
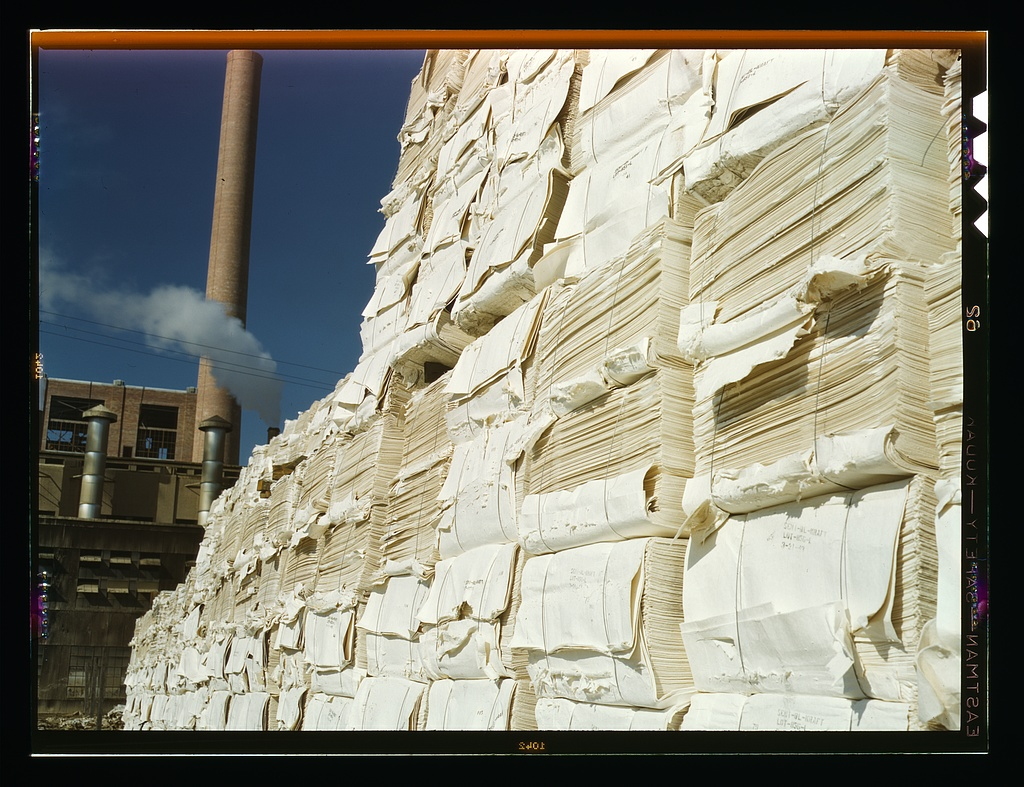
Southland Paper mill

The golden era of expansion occurred between 1938 and 1945. In the late 1930s, two of the principal industries in Lufkin, the Southland Paper Mill, later known as Abitibi Bowater Inc. which closed in 2007, and Texas Foundries opened. These companies provided much of Lufkin's industrial growth. The largest industrial employer was Lufkin Foundry and Machine Company, later known as Lufkin Industries; it ceased operations in 2018.

From 1943 to 1945, Lufkin was home to three WWII POW camps and held up to 300 German prisoners who worked for Southland Paper.

=== Cultural expansion and mid-to-late twentieth century ===
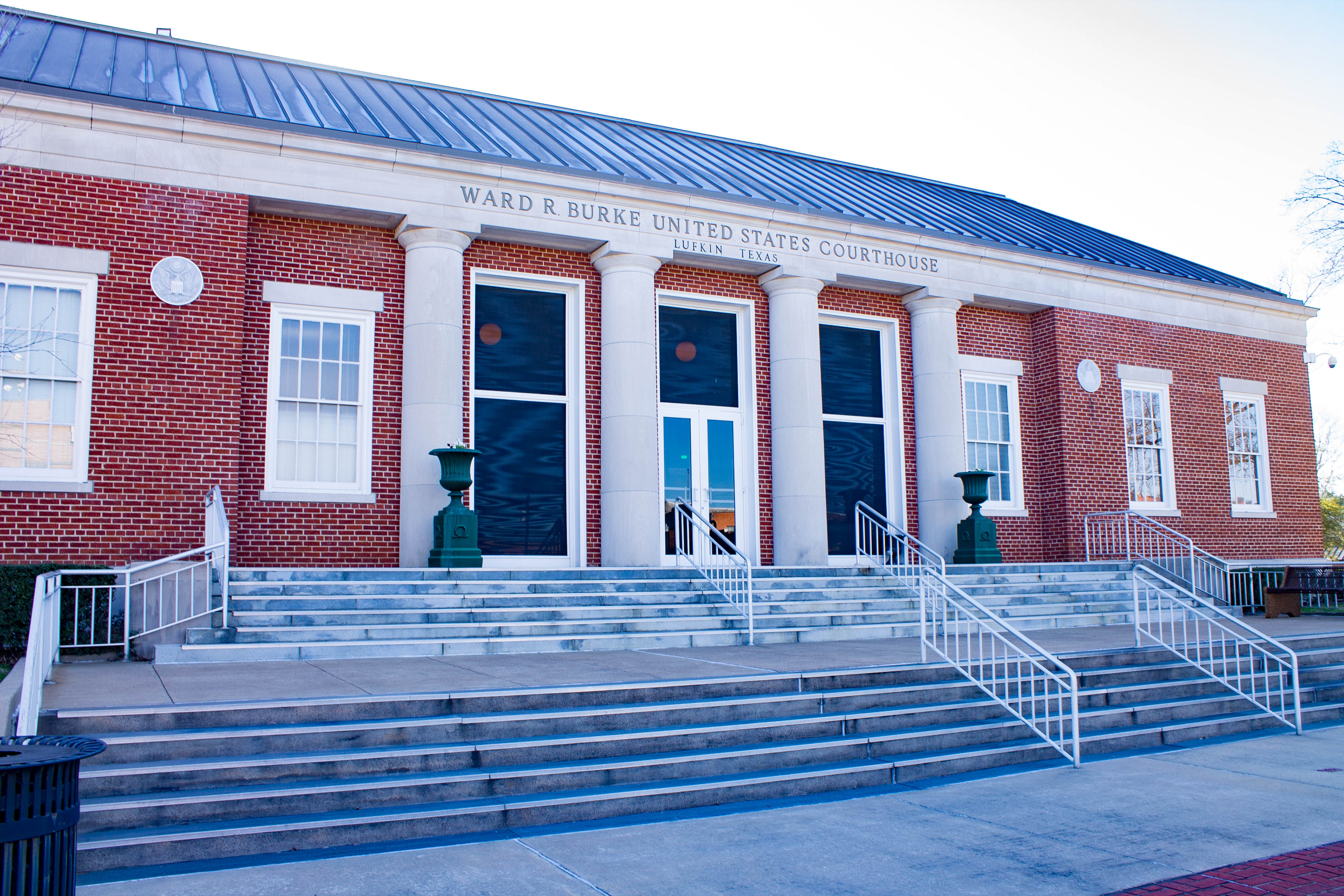
Lufkin Federal Building

In early Lufkin history, most daily life revolved around churches, schools, and sports activities, but this began to change between 1965 and 1983, when Lufkin began a cultural expansion. Improvements included the Kurth Memorial Library, new museums, a civic center, Angelina College, a new federal building, a country club, municipal and city parks, two shopping malls, and the Lufkin Independent School District.

Before 1970, Lufkin schools were segregated with separate schools for different races. After a series of court challenges started in 1964 were resolved, in 1970 the LISD was integrated. A federal court order in place from 1970-2000 enforced integration.

Lufkin celebrated its centennial in 1982.

=== Recent history ===
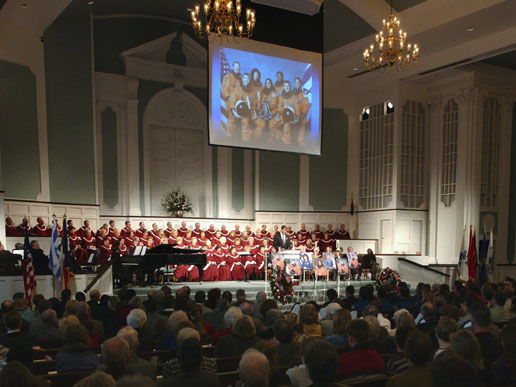
Thousands gather at the Columbia memorial in Lufkin, 2003.

Debris from the Space Shuttle Columbia disaster fell over the Lufkin area on February 1, 2003.

A Little League Baseball team from Lufkin, locally known as the Thundering 13, won the U.S. Championship at the 2017 Little League World Series in Williamsport, Pennsylvania. There have been many community tributes to the team.

== Geography ==
According to the United States Census Bureau, in 2019, the city has a total area of 34.48 sq mi (89.3 km^{2}).

Lufkin is at the crossroads of East Texas at the intersections of Highways US 59, future Interstate 69, which leads to Houston and the Rio Grande Valley to the south and Nacogdoches and Texarkana to the north, and US 69, which leads from the Golden Triangle of southeast Texas (Orange, Port Arthur and Beaumont) to points such as Jacksonville, Tyler, Dallas, and Oklahoma to the north.

Lufkin is 115 miles (185 km) northeast of Houston.

The elevation of Lufkin is 139 to 404 ft above mean sea level.

=== National forests and grasslands ===
The headquarters of all four United States National Forests and two United States National Grasslands in Texas are located in Lufkin. They are the Angelina, Davy Crockett, Sabine, and Sam Houston National Forests, and the Caddo and Lyndon B. Johnson National Grasslands.

=== Climate ===
Lufkin is a humid subtropical climate that generally has relatively high temperatures with evenly distributed precipitation throughout the year. Generally, this climate is seen on the eastern side continents between 20 and 35°N or S latitude. During summer, these regions over low-latitude ocean waters are generally under the influence of hot, maritime overflow from the western side of subtropical anticyclonic cells. These higher temperatures can lead to warm, oppressive nights. Due to an increase in thunderstorms, summers in Lufkin are usually wetter than winters. Additionally, tropical cyclones can increase precipitation during the summer. Cold months are usually mild and frost is uncommon.

Climate data for Lufkin, Texas (Angelina County Airport) 1991–2020 normals, extremes 1906–present
Month	Jan	Feb	Mar	Apr	May	Jun	Jul	Aug	Sep	Oct	Nov	Dec	Year
Record high °F (°C)	86 (30)	92 (33)	97 (36)	98 (37)	99 (37)	106 (41)	108 (42)	110 (43)	110 (43)	100 (38)	90 (32)	89 (32)	110 (43)
Mean daily maximum °F (°C)	59.8 (15.4)	64.1 (17.8)	71.1 (21.7)	77.8 (25.4)	84.5 (29.2)	90.3 (32.4)	93.3 (34.1)	93.7 (34.3)	88.7 (31.5)	79.8 (26.6)	68.8 (20.4)	61.1 (16.2)	77.8 (25.4)
Daily mean °F (°C)	48.6 (9.2)	52.8 (11.6)	59.4 (15.2)	66.0 (18.9)	73.8 (23.2)	79.9 (26.6)	82.5 (28.1)	82.4 (28.0)	77.3 (25.2)	67.4 (19.7)	57.0 (13.9)	50.2 (10.1)	66.4 (19.1)
Mean daily minimum °F (°C)	37.5 (3.1)	41.5 (5.3)	47.7 (8.7)	54.2 (12.3)	63.0 (17.2)	69.4 (20.8)	71.7 (22.1)	71.1 (21.7)	65.9 (18.8)	55.0 (12.8)	45.2 (7.3)	39.3 (4.1)	55.1 (12.8)
Record low °F (°C)	−2 (−19)	−2 (−19)	16 (−9)	30 (−1)	39 (4)	50 (10)	56 (13)	54 (12)	36 (2)	25 (−4)	15 (−9)	2 (−17)	−2 (−19)
Average precipitation inches (mm)	4.66 (118)	3.88 (99)	4.21 (107)	3.69 (94)	4.64 (118)	4.22 (107)	3.34 (85)	3.75 (95)	3.94 (100)	4.73 (120)	4.53 (115)	4.68 (119)	50.27 (1,277)
Average precipitation days (≥ 0.01 in)	9.9	9.0	9.0	7.6	9.1	9.5	8.0	8.1	7.5	7.3	8.0	9.9	102.9
Source: NOAA

== Demographics ==
Historical population
Census	Pop.	Note	%±
1890	529		—
1900	1,527		188.7%
1910	2,749		80.0%
1920	4,878		77.4%
1930	7,311		49.9%
1940	9,567		30.9%
1950	15,135		58.2%
1960	17,641		16.6%
1970	23,049		30.7%
1980	28,562		23.9%
1990	30,206		5.8%
2000	32,709		8.3%
2010	35,067		7.2%
2020	34,143		−2.6%
U.S. Decennial Census

=== 2020 census ===
As of the 2020 census, there were 34,143 people, 13,223 households, and 8,277 families residing in the city; the median age was 37.4 years.

24.8% of residents were under the age of 18 and 17.9% of residents were 65 years of age or older. For every 100 females there were 88.8 males, and for every 100 females age 18 and over there were 84.9 males age 18 and over.

98.2% of residents lived in urban areas, while 1.8% lived in rural areas.

Of those households, 32.2% had children under the age of 18 living in them. Of all households, 39.9% were married-couple households, 18.5% were households with a male householder and no spouse or partner present, and 35.6% were households with a female householder and no spouse or partner present. About 31.0% of all households were made up of individuals and 13.3% had someone living alone who was 65 years of age or older.

There were 14,679 housing units, of which 9.9% were vacant. The homeowner vacancy rate was 1.6% and the rental vacancy rate was 10.6%.

Racial composition as of the 2020 census
Race	Number	Percent
White	16,048	47.0%
Black or African American	9,156	26.8%
American Indian and Alaska Native	236	0.7%
Asian	674	2.0%
Native Hawaiian and Other Pacific Islander	21	0.1%
Some other race	4,282	12.5%
Two or more races	3,726	10.9%
Hispanic or Latino (of any race)	9,407	27.6%

=== Crime ===
In 2018, Lufkin's crime rate was 4,666 crimes per 100,000 persons, which was an overall decrease by 2% from 2017; 134 violent crimes and 1,403 property crimes were reported.

== Economy ==
Lufkin is home to Lufkin Industries and Lufkin Gears LLC, which manufactures and services oil field equipment and power transmission equipment, and supplies of creosote-treated utility poles. It is also home to the Atkinson Candy Company, the creator of the Chick-O-Stick, and Brookshire Brothers, a chain of grocery stores in Texas and Louisiana. Lufkin received Texas's first biomass power plant in late 2009. Aspen Power is building the power plant.

Some of the city's major employers include:

- Angelina College, community college with enrollment of 5,000
- Atkinson Candy Company, founded and headquartered in Lufkin
- Brookshire Brothers, a regional grocery company founded and headquartered in Lufkin
- Lufkin Industries, founded and headquartered in Lufkin, oil pumping manufacturer
- Lufkin Gears LLC, founded and headquartered in Lufkin, power transmission equipment manufacturer
- Lufkin Independent School District
- Pilgrim's, poultry processor that employs more than 1,500 people
- Stephen F. Austin State University, state university (located in Nacogdoches; some employees reside in Lufkin)
- Temple-Inland is Fortune 500 company that produces paper, wood, and other related products. Headquartered in Diboll, 15 miles (24 km) south of Lufkin, it has employment in Lufkin, as well. Temple-Inland was sold to International Paper.

According to the city's 2019 Comprehensive Annual Financial Report, the top employers in the city are:

Rank	Employer	Employees	Fraction of total city employment
1	Lufkin Independent School District	>1000	2.34%
2	Pilgrim's Pride	>1000	1.98%
3	Brookshire Brothers	>1000	1.67%
4	Lufkin State Supporting Living Center	>1000	1.67%
5	CHI St. Luke's Health Memorial	>1000	1.64%
6	Woodland Heights Medical Center	500–999	0.88%
7	Georgia Pacific	500–999	0.83%
8	City of Lufkin	400–500	0.70%
9	Walmart	400–500	0.68%
10	Angelina County	400–500	0.61%

== Arts and culture ==
=== Festivals ===
Texas State Forest Festival and Southern Hushpuppy Championships run in September. The festival brings net profits to the city of US$60,000.

=== Points of interest ===
- Crown Colony Country Club Golf Course, third-rated golf course in Texas by the Dallas Morning News
- Downtown Walking Tour, a tour through historic downtown Lufkin Ellen Trout Park, a public park with a lake and playgrounds
- Ellen Trout Zoo, public zoo owned by the City of Lufkin with more than 500 animals
- First United Methodist Church
- Lufkin Azalea Trail, 1.9-mile (3.1 km) public nature trail
- Medford Collection of American Western Art, the contemporary art collection at the Lufkin City Hall
- Museum of East Texas, exhibits on regional history and art
- Naranjo Museum of Natural History
- Pine Valley Raceway, ¼-mile drag strip located ten miles southwest of Lufkin.
- Pines Theater, refurbished multiuse facility in downtown, seats 459
- Texas Forestry Museum features exhibits about forestry of the Lufkin and East Texas area.
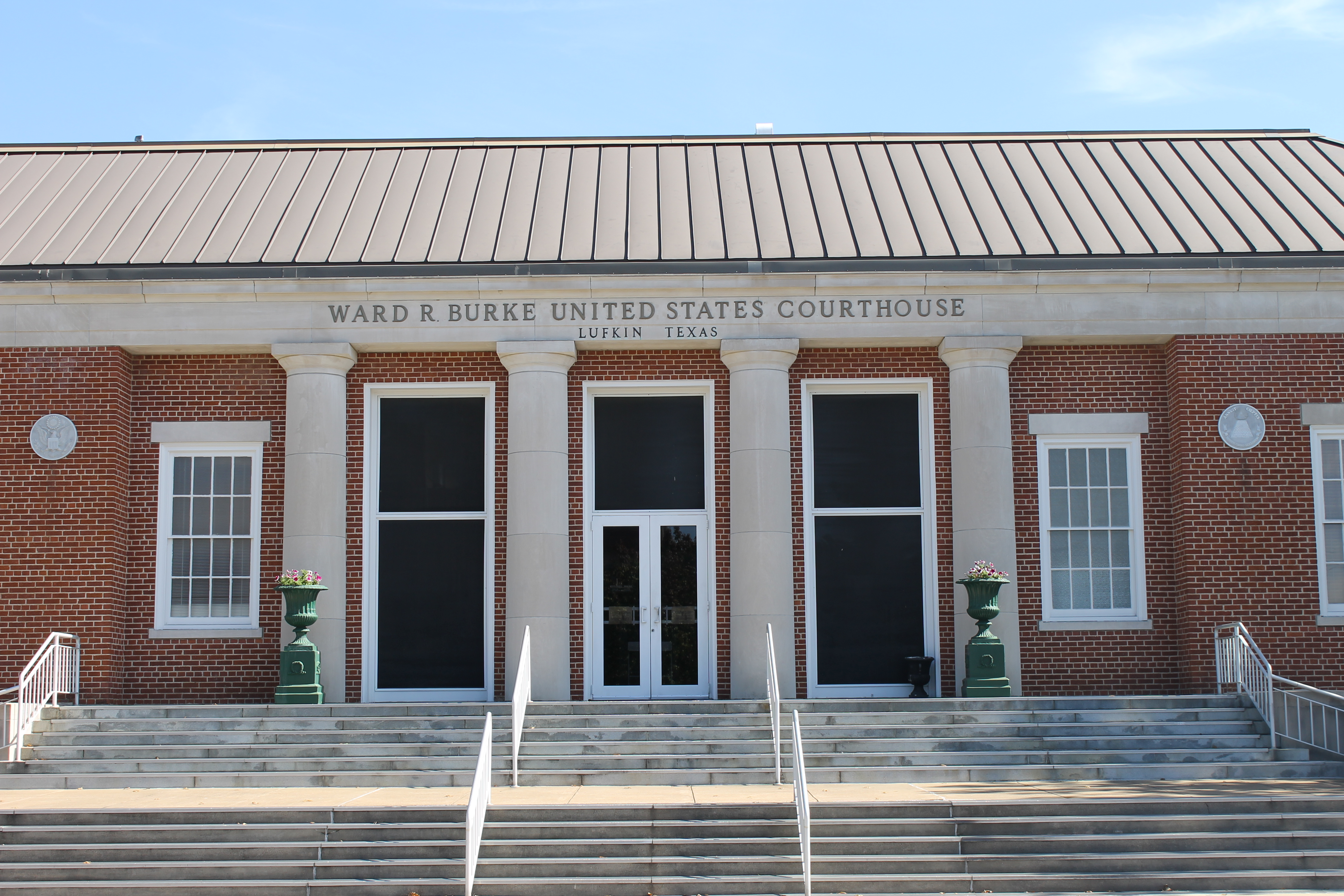
Ward R. Burke United States Courthouse

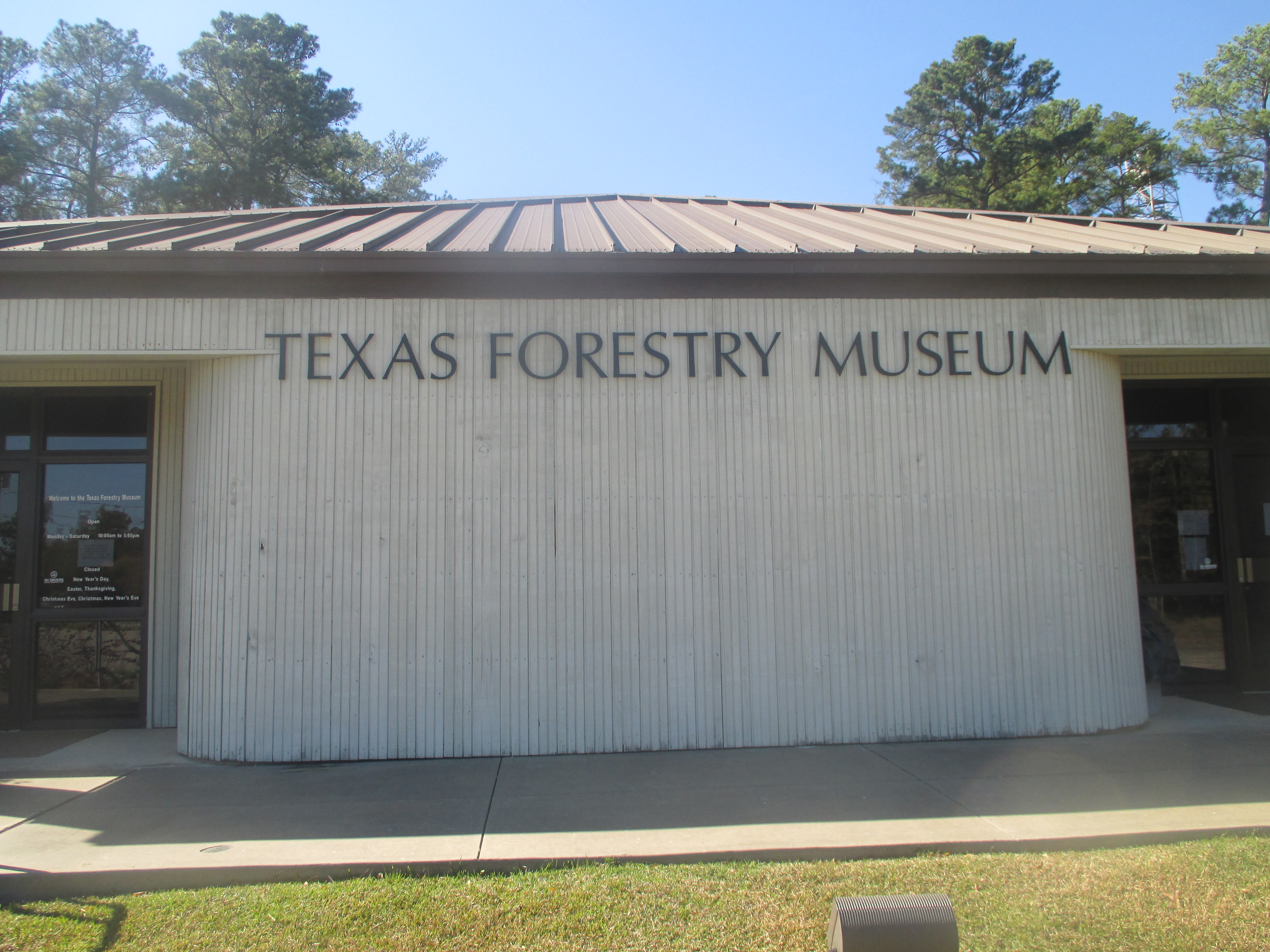
Texas Forestry Museum

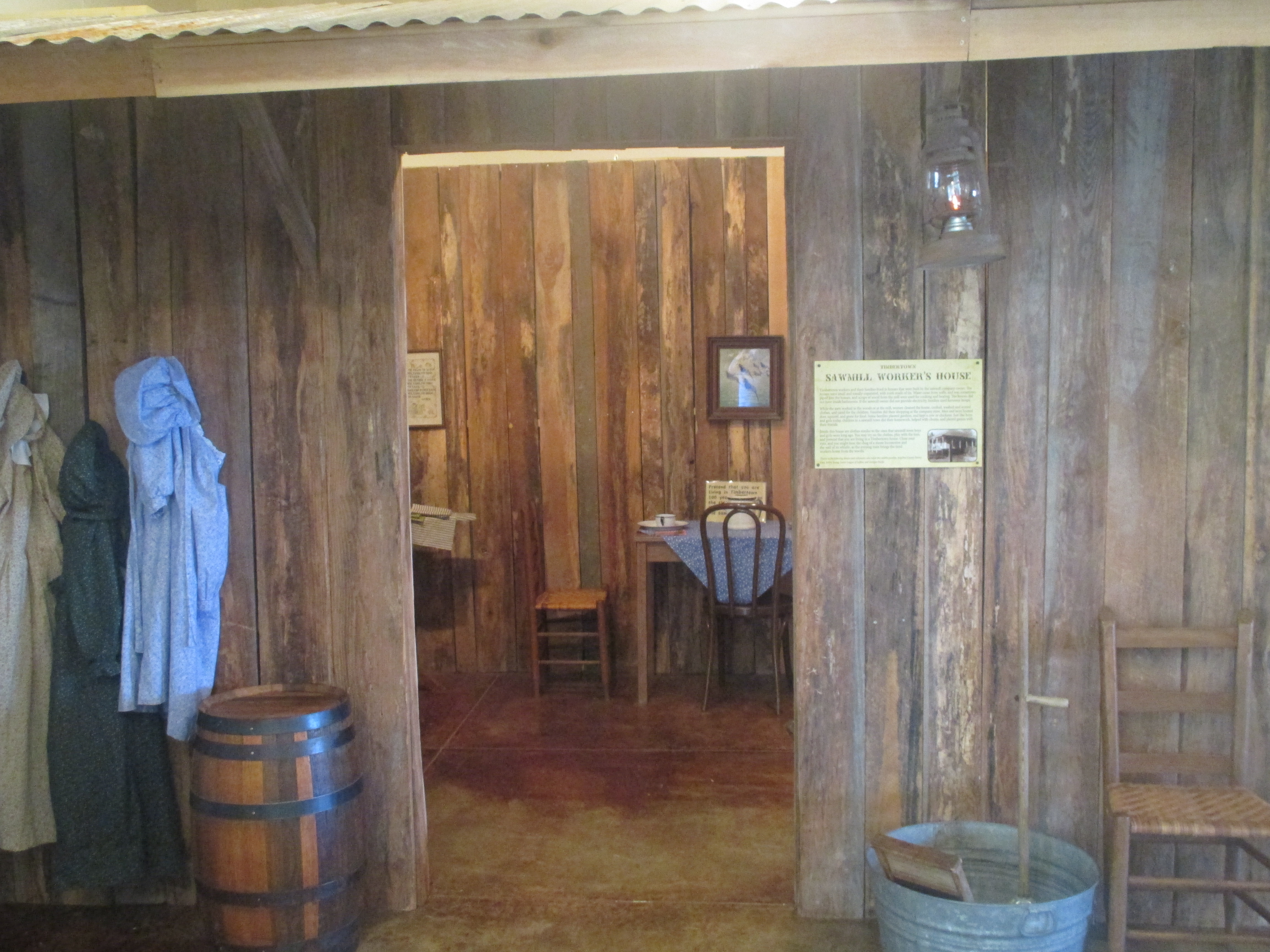
Replica of a sawmill worker's house at the Texas Forestry Museum

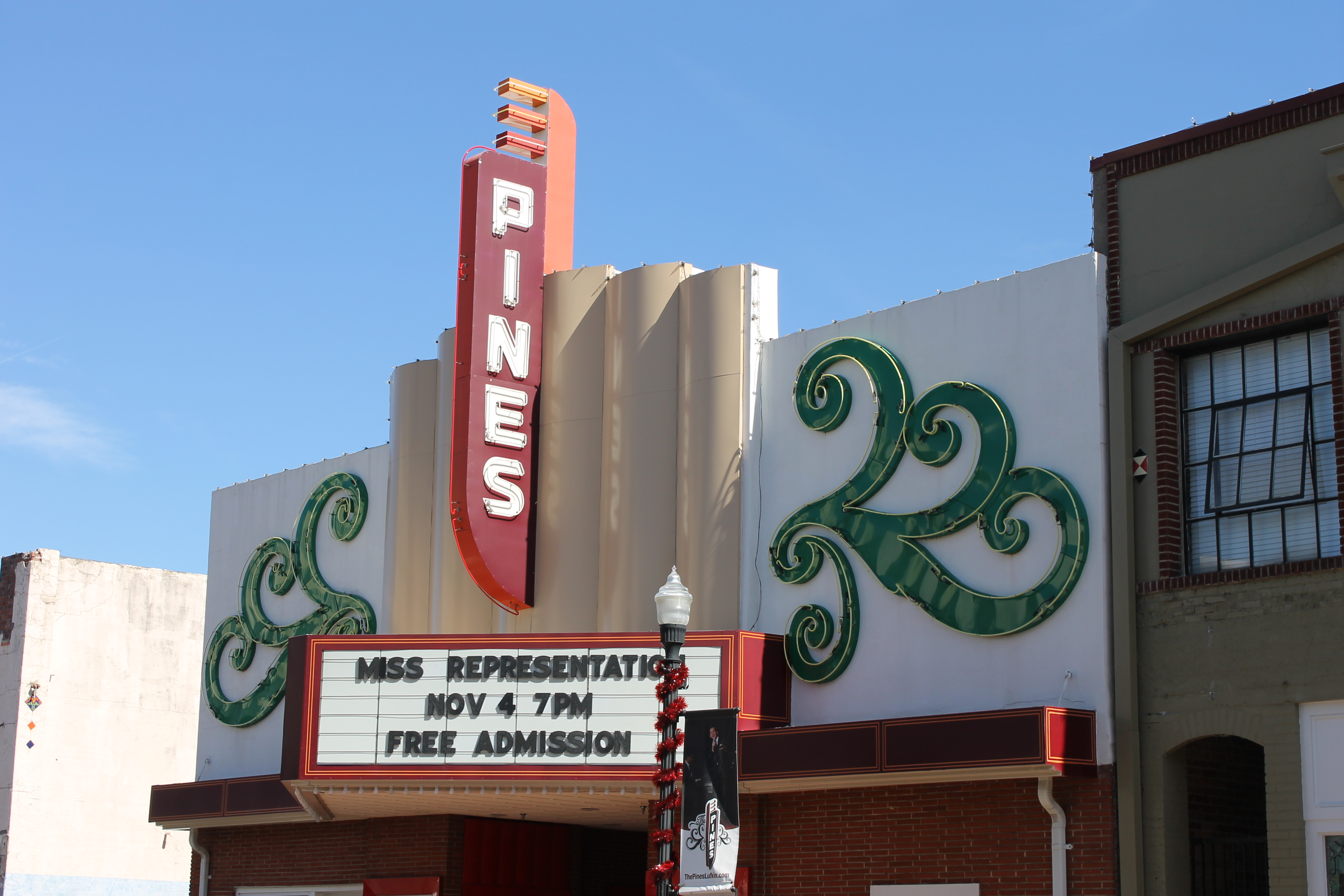
Pines Theater

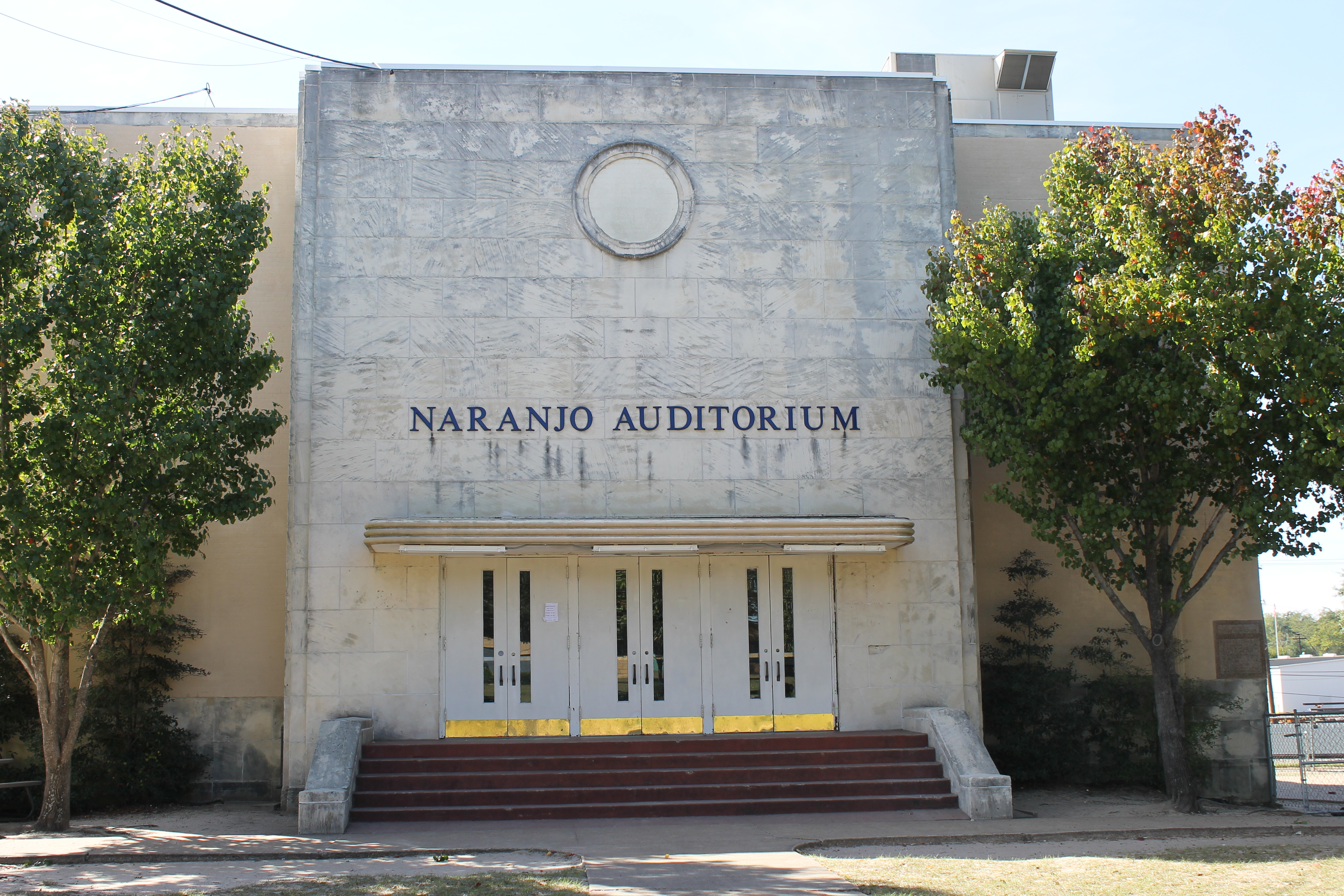
Naranjo Auditorium

== Government ==
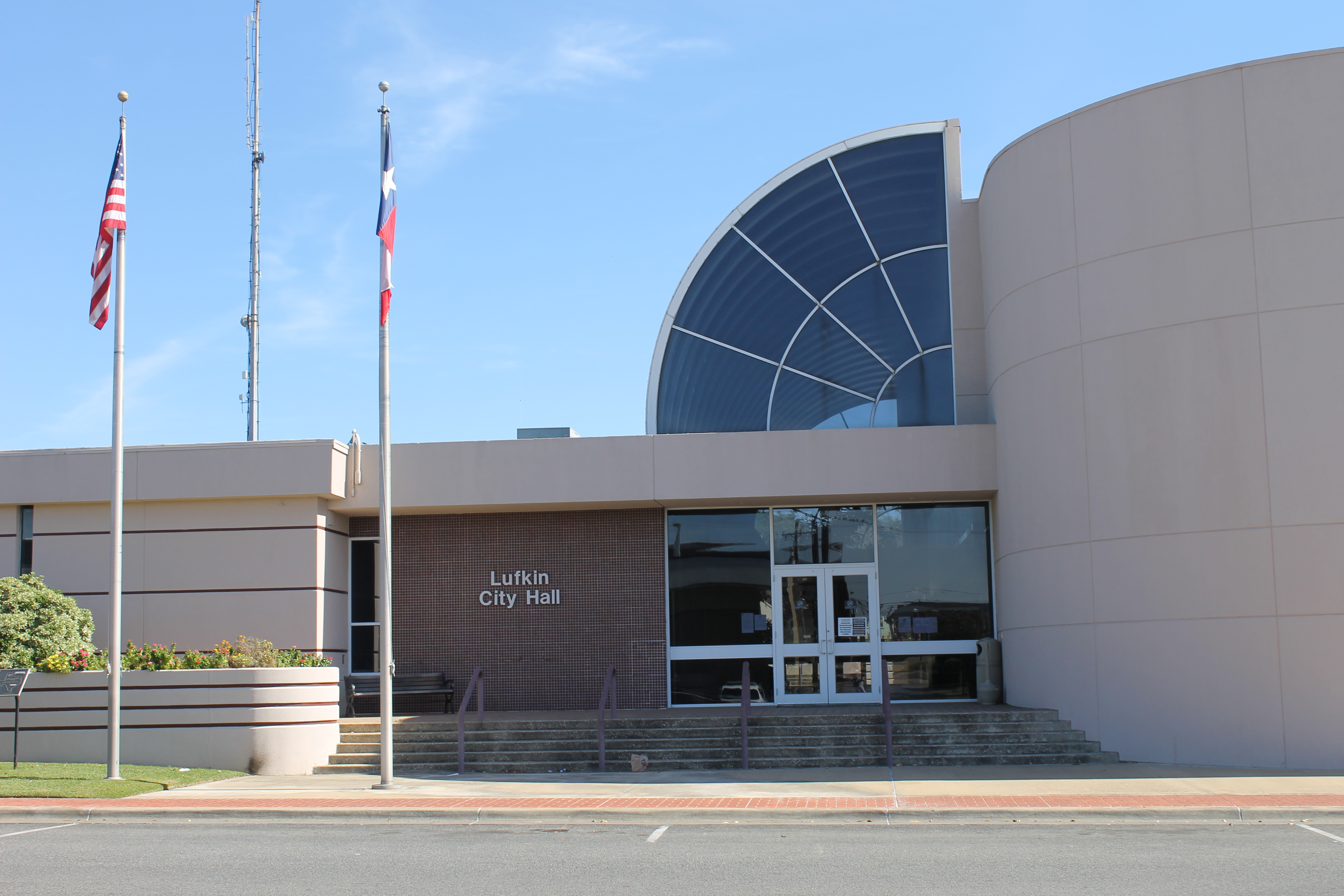
City hall

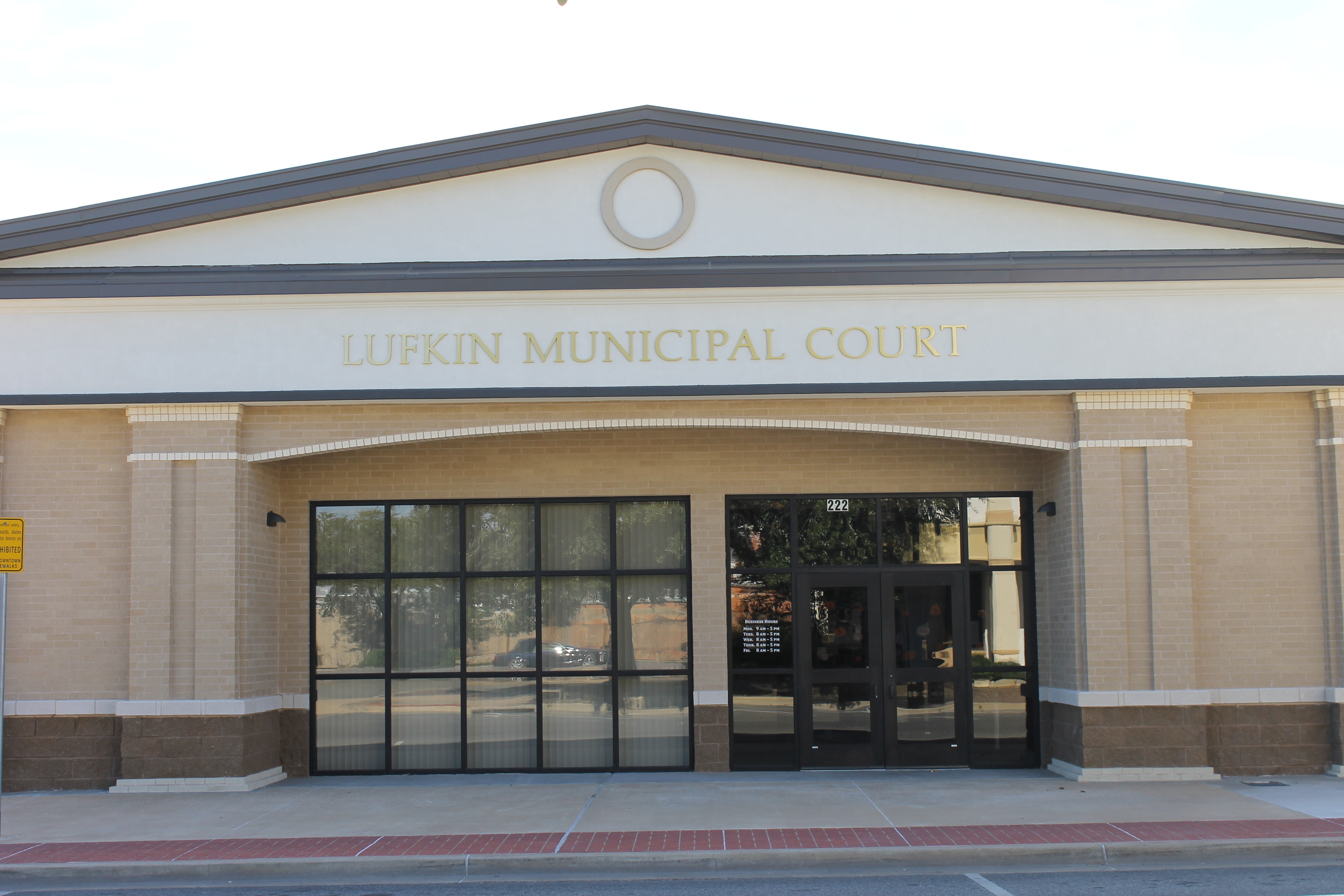
Municipal Court

Lufkin in comparison to the U.S. average leans more conservative politically. However, the city leans more liberal than Angelina County and the state Texas' averages.

=== Federal government ===
Lufkin falls under Texas's 17th congressional district, which is currently represented by Republican Pete Sessions. The senators who represent Texas are Ted Cruz and John Cornyn, who are both Republicans.

=== State government ===
In the Texas House of Representatives, Lufkin falls under district 57 and is represented by Republican Trent Ashby, who is a resident of Lufkin. In the Texas Senate Lufkin falls under district 3 and is represented by Republican Robert Nichols.

=== Municipal government ===
According to the city's 2017 Comprehensive Annual Financial Report, Lufkin's various funds had $38.8 million in revenue, $43.7 million in expenditures, $85.7 million in total assets, $5.3 million in total liabilities, and $14.9 million in cash and investments.

The City of Lufkin has a council-manager form of government. The city is divided into six city council districts, and the mayor is elected by a citywide vote. All elected positions are elected on a nonpartisan ballot, as required by Texas law. The city council's responsibility is to make all legislative and policy decisions, while the responsibility of the city manager is to decide all administrative decisions.

The mayor is Mark Hicks; the city manager is Kevin Gee.

== Education ==
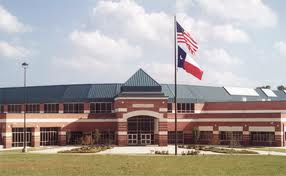
Lufkin High School

According to the United States Census Bureau 80.7% of people in Lufkin above the age of 25 are high-school graduates or higher. About 21.5% of people 25 and older have a bachelor's degree or higher.

Almost all of Lufkin's public schools are operated by the Lufkin Independent School District, with a few small sections in the west within the Hudson Independent School District. A very small portion of the city on Highway 69 is within Central ISD. Lufkin also has a small charter school, Pineywoods Community Academy, that serves grades Pre-K–12 and is an early college high school. Additionally, Lufkin is served by two small private schools, St. Cyprian's Episcopal School and St. Patrick Catholic School.

Angelina College, a community college, is located in Lufkin. The college has roughly 5,000 students. Additionally, Stephen F. Austin State University is located not far away in Nacogdoches, Texas.

== Media ==
=== Newspaper ===
- The Lufkin Daily News

=== Television ===
- KTRE: KTRE Channel 9 (ABC)
- KYTX: KYTX Channel 19 (CBS)
- KFXK-LP: KFXL Channel 30 (FOX)
- KLNM-LD: Millennium Communications (AmericaOne) Digital 42.1 and 42.2 (AMGTV)

=== Radio ===
==== AM stations ====
- KRBA: 1340 AM, the pioneer radio station in East Texas, established in 1938. (News/Talk, Variety)
- KSML (AM): ESPN 1260 (Sports)
- KSFA: News Talk 860 (News/Talk)
- XEG: 1050 AM La Ranchera de Monterrey (Regional Mexican) (night time)

==== FM stations ====
- KAXM: 90.1 Your East Texas Alternative (College)
- KYKS: Kicks 105 (Country)
- KJCS: 103 The Bull (Classic Country)
- KYBI: Y100 (Country)
- KSML-FM: Super Mix 101.9 (Regional Mexican)
- KAFX-FM: KFOX 95.5 (Top 40)
- KLDN: Red River Radio (NPR)
- KTBQ: Classic Rock Q107 (Classic Rock)
- KVLL: La Mejor 94.7 (Regional Mexican)
- KSWP: 90.9 KSWP (Contemporary Christian)
- KAVX: KAVX 91.9 (Christian talk)
- KXXE: The New Country Channel (Hot Country)
- KOYE: La Invasora 97.5 (Regional Mexican)
- KLVH: K-Love 97.1 (Contemporary Christian)
- KGFZ: Z-97.7 (Hip Hop/R&B)
- KHPT: The Eagle 106.9 (107.5 simulcast KGLK) (Classic Rock)

== Infrastructure ==
=== Transportation ===
Lufkin is served by U.S. Highway 69, U.S. Highway 59, State Highway 94, and State Highway 103.

Lufkin will be served by the extension to Interstate 69, which is planned to run from the Canada–US border at Port Huron, Michigan, to the Texas/Mexico border.

General aviation service is provided by Angelina County Airport.

The Coach USA bus lines serve Lufkin, carried under the Kerrville Bus Company.

Brazos Transit District (formerly Brazos Valley Transit Authority) provides regularly scheduled public bus service in the Lufkin area.

The Angelina and Neches River Railroad (A&NR) runs through Lufkin. It has an approximate length of 20 miles (32 km) and connects with the Union Pacific Railroad lines.

=== Health care ===
Lufkin is served by two hospitals: CHI St. Luke's Health Memorial (formerly Memorial Health System of East Texas at Lufkin), which includes the Arthur Temple Sr. Regional Cancer Center, and Woodland Heights Medical Center.

== Notable people ==
- Jacques Abram, classical pianist
- Trent Ashby, member of the Texas House of Representatives from Lufkin
- Louis Beam, white supremacist and neo-fascist
- Brandon Belt, Toronto Blue Jays first baseman and 2012 and 2014 World Series champion with the San Francisco Giants
- Dez Bryant, former Oklahoma State University standout; former Dallas Cowboys wide receiver
- Carrington Byndom, former Carolina Panthers cornerback, current NFL Free Agent
- Corey Clark, American Idol contestant, famous for his alleged affair with Paula Abdul
- Keke Coutee, Houston Texans wide receiver
- Anthony Denman, former NFL linebacker
- Medford Bryan Evans, college professor, author, conservative political activist
- Jermichael Finley, former Texas Longhorns football and Green Bay Packers player
- William Delbert Gann, finance trader
- Rex Hadnot, former guard with Houston Cougars and San Diego Chargers
- Dante Hall, former Texas A&M Kansas City Chiefs and St. Louis Rams player
- Max Hopper, modern-era CIO and a founding father of IT-inspired competitive advantage
- Ken Houston, played for the Houston Oilers and Washington Redskins
- Ray Jones, former NFL defensive back
- Reagan Jones, founder and vocalist of electronica band Iris
- Terrence Kiel, former Texas A&M University and San Diego Chargers safety
- Jorvorskie Lane, former Tampa Bay Buccaneers and Texas A&M University football player
- Abe Martin, college football coach
- Reggie McNeal, former player with Texas A&M University and Cincinnati Bengals
- Don Muhlbach, former Texas A&M player; current Detroit Lions long snapper
- Tom Murphy, former Major League Baseball pitcher
- Ja'Lynn Polk, former University of Washington and New England Patriots wide receiver
- Jim Reese, former guitarist for the Bobby Fuller Four
- Joe Robb, former NFL lineman
- Ryan Rottman, actor
- Pete Runnels, former infielder with various teams
- Kimberly Saenz, convicted serial killer
- Chris Seelbach, former Atlanta Braves pitcher
- Jacoby Shepherd, former NFL cornerback
- Allan Shivers, 37th Texas governor, 1949–1957
- Tedashii, Christian rapper
- Buddy Temple, businessman and former politician
- T. J. Turner, former NFL defensive end
- Charlie Wilson, former U.S. representative best known for Operation Cyclone
- J. Frank Wilson, lead vocalist of J. Frank Wilson and the Cavaliers
