= KRBA =

- Lufkin, Texas; United States
- Frequency: 1340 kHz
- Branding: Country Legends

Programming
- Format: Country music

Ownership
- Owner: Kasa Family Limited Partnership
- Sister stations: KSML, KSML-FM, KYBI

History
- First air date: June 15, 1938 (at 1310 kHz)
- Call sign meaning: Redland Broadcasting Association

Technical information
- Licensing authority: FCC
- Facility ID: 63326
- Class: C
- Power: 1,000 watts unlimited
- Transmitter coordinates: 31°21′53.00″N 94°43′8.00″W

Links
- Public license information: Public file; LMS
- Website: East Texas First Radio

KRBA (1340 AM), is a terrestrial American radio station, licensed to Lufkin, Texas, United States. The station is currently owned by Kasa Family Limited Partnership.

== History ==
KRBA began broadcasting on May 3, 1938 at 100 watts of daytime only power, operating on 1310 kilocycles in the AM radio band. A License to Cover was issued for the facility on June 15, 1938. It is the first broadcast facility to be licensed in Lufkin-Nacogdoches. The facility increased power to 250 watts unlimited hours on July 13, 1939. During an industry wide frequency reallocation procedure under the NARBA agreement, on March 28, 1941 the station's operation was moved by the FCC to 1340 kilocycles.

On February 15, 1966, KRBA's daytime power was increased to the current 1 kilowatt. The broadcast studios have been in three location in KRBA's history, all of which are located in downtown Lufkin. The original site was on the 2nd floor above the Cash Drug Store, which was later part of the Perry Building. Cash Drug Store burned down in 1941 causing the owner, Darrell Yates, to move the studio to the location of the old Rogers Drug Store.

In January 1956, the studios were again moved to the present location on Cotton Square. The transmitting site and antenna has continuously been located on the Old Nacogdoches Highway, which is now Spence Street in Lufkin, since the construction of the station in 1938.

KRBA's original programming attempted to present something on the air for everyone in Angelina County. From 1938 through the early 1940s, the station regularly broadcast news, dramatic programming, musical transcriptions of all varieties, and live preachers of various denominations. The 1950s and 1960s would continue with a variety format, though dramatic programming would be phased out over time, with more programs directed towards housewives & farmers, and a direct request musical program called "Song and Dance Parade" would begin to lead the format in the "Rock n' Roll" direction, which became a major part of the station's legacy.

KRBA's "Tunes and Tempos" played Rhythm and Blues, and would introduce African-American radio announcers to the local audience in the 1950s and 1960s. Spanish musical programming would be introduced for the first time on the station in 1968.

KRBA began moving to a more consistent Country and Western format in the mid 1970s, though it would also continue with the traditional gospel programs that had become a KRBA trademark since 1938.

The programming variety would be enhanced by Darrell Yates when he signed on the first FM sister station to KRBA, as 99.3 KDEY Lufkin on July 27, 1978. That station now operates as KYBI "Y100", since moved to 100.1 MHz, and remains the FM sister of KRBA to this day.

May 3, 2018, marked the 80th year of continuous operation for the heritage KRBA in the Lufkin-Nacogdoches market. It is currently owned and operated by Kasa Family, L.P..

Kasa Family requested an FM translator for KRBA, which was granted by the Federal Communications Commission and issued a Construction Permit to build a 250 watts Class D facility on Channel 281 (104.1 MHz), April 18, 2018. The construction permit, which would have brought KRBA programming to the FM dial, expired on April 18, 2021.
