= Sucker rod =

Steel rod used in oil industry

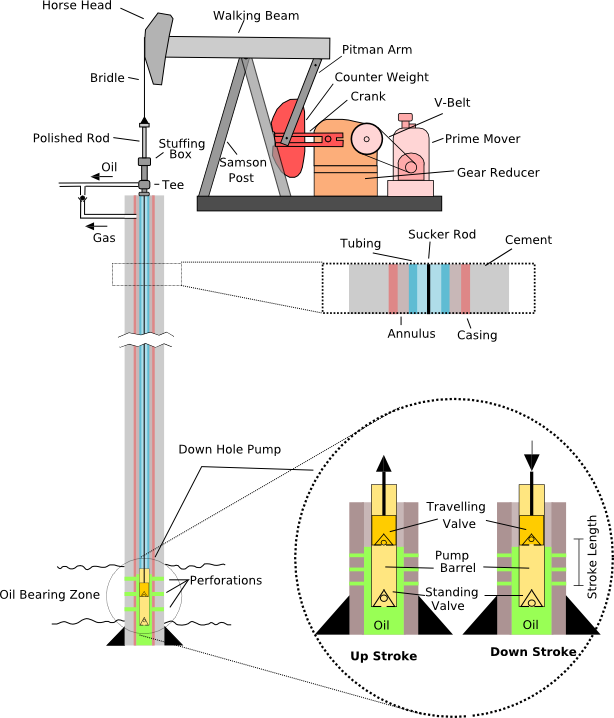
The line of sucker rods is represented in this diagram by the solid black line in the center of the well

A sucker rod is a steel rod, typically measuring between 7 and 9 metres (25 and 30 ft) in length, with threaded ends at both sides. It is used in the oil industry to connect the surface components with the downhole components of a reciprocating piston pump in an oil well. The pumpjack, which is the visible above-ground drive for the well pump, is linked to the downhole pump at the base of the well through a series of interconnected sucker rods. Sucker rods are also available in fiberglass, typically manufactured in lengths of 37 1/2 feet and diameters of 3/4, 7/8, 1, and 1 1/4 inch. These rods feature metallic threaded ends, female on one side and male on the other.

The surface unit transfers energy from the prime-mover to the sucker rod string to facilitate well pumping. It achieves this by converting the rotary motion of the prime-mover into the reciprocating motion required by the sucker rod and reducing the prime-mover's speed to a suitable pumping rate. Speed reduction is managed through a gear reducer, while the rotary motion of the crankshaft is transformed into oscillatory motion using a walking beam. The crank arm connects to the walking beam via a pitman arm. The walking beam is supported by a Samson post and saddle bearing. The horse head and bridle ensure vertical pull on the sucker rod string at all times, preventing bearing movement above the stuffing box. A combination of the polished rod and stuffing box is employed to maintain an effective liquid seal at the surface.

== See also ==
- Oilfield terminology
