= KYKS =

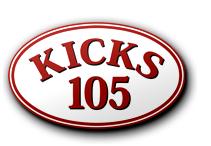
- Lufkin, Texas; United States
- Broadcast area: Lufkin/Nacogdoches
- Frequency: 105.1 MHz
- Branding: Kicks 105

Programming
- Format: Country
- Affiliations: Compass Media Networks

Ownership
- Owner: Townsquare Media; (Townsquare License, LLC)
- Sister stations: KAFX-FM; KSFA; KTBQ

History
- First air date: September 29, 1976 (as KLUF-FM)
- Former call signs: KLUF-FM (1976-1979)
- Call sign meaning: "Kicks" (branding)

Technical information
- Licensing authority: FCC
- Facility ID: 25582
- Class: C0
- ERP: 100,000 watts
- HAAT: 325 meters (1,066 ft)
- Transmitter coordinates: 31°22′8.7″N 94°38′45.7″W

Links
- Public license information: Public file; LMS
- Webcast: Listen live
- Website: kicks105.com

KYKS (105.1 FM) is a Townsquare Media radio station serving the Lufkin/Nacogdoches area with a country music format.

== History ==
KYKS was first proposed by K.M. Bardield, under the licensee name of Lufkin Broadcasting Corporation in 1972. The facility was proposed to operate with 100 kilowatts non-directional, at 490 meters (1,610 ft) above average terrain, from a transmission site on Farm to Market Road 2021, 6.5 miles northwest of Lufkin. The specifications for the site gave it the largest FM coverage area in the Lufkin-Nacogdoches area at the time.

The facility was built and received an initial license to cover on September 29, 1976, as KLUF-FM.

KLUF-FM changed its call sign to the current KYKS on January 1, 1980, formatted as country music station "Kicks 105". The format and branding are currently the longest running continuous FM operation in the Lufkin-Nacogdoches area, only eclipsed by AM station KRBA, which began operations in 1938, and has held a country format since the 1970s.
