= KSFA =

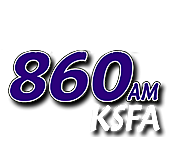
- Nacogdoches, Texas; United States
- Broadcast area: Lufkin/Nacogdoches
- Frequency: 860 kHz
- Branding: NewsTalk 860 KSFA

Programming
- Format: News/talk
- Affiliations: Fox News Radio; Compass Media Networks; Premiere Networks; Radio America; Westwood One; Stephen F. Austin State University (athletics)

Ownership
- Owner: Townsquare Media; (Townsquare License, LLC)
- Sister stations: KAFX-FM; KYKS; KTBQ

History
- First air date: June 2, 1947
- Call sign meaning: Stephen F. Austin or Stephen F. Austin State University

Technical information
- Licensing authority: FCC
- Facility ID: 11741
- Class: D
- Power: 1,000 watts day; 175 watts night
- Transmitter coordinates: 31°31′36.7″N 94°39′29.8″W
- Translator: See § Translator

Links
- Public license information: Public file; LMS
- Webcast: Listen live
- Website: ksfa860.com

KSFA (860 AM) is a Townsquare Media news/talk radio station licensed to Nacogdoches, Texas, and serving the Lufkin/Nacogdoches area.

Notable weekday programming includes shows hosted by Brad Maule, Spence Peppard, Glenn Beck, Sean Hannity, and Mark Levin, plus Coast to Coast AM.

== Translator ==
Broadcast translator for KSFA
Call sign	Frequency	City of license	FID	ERP (W)	HAAT	Class	Transmitter coordinates	FCC info
K283CW	104.5 FM	Nacogdoches, Texas	201091	250	0 m (0 ft)	D	31°31′37″N 94°39′30″W	LMS
