= KSML (AM) =

- Diboll, Texas; United States
- Broadcast area: Lufkin-Nacogdoches
- Frequency: 1260 kHz
- Branding: Power 103-7

Programming
- Format: Urban contemporary gospel and urban adult contemporary

Ownership
- Owner: Kasa Family Limited Partnership
- Sister stations: KRBA, KSML-FM, KYBI

History
- First air date: March 3, 1986
- Former call signs: KAFX (1986–1986); KDFX (1989–1996)
- Call sign meaning: Super Mix Lufkin (former branding)

Technical information
- Licensing authority: FCC
- Facility ID: 18106
- Class: D
- Power: 4,500 watts (day); 72 watts (night)
- Transmitter coordinates: 31°21′53.00″N 94°43′8.00″W
- Translator: See § Translator

Links
- Public license information: Public file; LMS
- Webcast: Listen live

KSML (1260 kHz) is a terrestrial American AM radio station, paired with an FM relay translator, broadcasting an urban contemporary gospel and urban adult contemporary format. Licensed to Diboll, Texas, United States, the station serves the Lufkin-Nacogdoches area. The station is currently owned by Kasa Family Limited Partnership.

== Translator ==
Broadcast translator for KSML
Call sign	Frequency	City of license	FID	ERP (W)	HAAT	Class	Transmitter coordinates	FCC info
K279DC	103.7 FM	Diboll, Texas	201631	250	207 m (679 ft)	D	31°20′5.00″N 94°40′10.00″W	LMS

== History ==
The station was assigned the call letters KAFX on 1986-03-03. on 1988-12-14, the station changed its call sign to KAFX, on 1989-01-01 to KDFX, on 1996-02-09 to the current KSML,

Former logo
