= KTBQ =

- Nacogdoches, Texas; United States
- Broadcast area: Lufkin/Nacogdoches, Texas
- Frequency: 107.7 MHz
- Branding: Q107

Programming
- Format: Classic rock
- Affiliations: Compass Media Networks; Premiere Networks; United Stations Radio Networks

Ownership
- Owner: Townsquare Media; (Townsquare License, LLC)
- Sister stations: KAFX-FM; KSFA; KYKS

History
- First air date: June 15, 1967 (as KSFA-FM)
- Former call signs: KSFA-FM (1967–1978); KTBC (1978–1989)
- Former frequencies: 92.1 MHz (1967–1989)
- Call sign meaning: Texan Broadcasting (former owner) Q (branding)

Technical information
- Licensing authority: FCC
- Facility ID: 11740
- Class: C3
- ERP: 13,000 watts
- HAAT: 122 m (400 ft)
- Transmitter coordinates: 31°34′58.6″N 94°39′59.8″W

Links
- Public license information: Public file; LMS
- Webcast: Listen live
- Website: www.q1077.com

KTBQ (107.7 FM) is a Townsquare Media classic rock formatted radio station serving the Lufkin/Nacogdoches area. Q107 has featured classic rock since 1997, remaining in the format over 25 years.

== History ==
In 1989 Ken Williams from Center City Communications purchased KTBC-FM 92.1 from Texan Broadcasting Company Bob Dunn and upgraded to 50 kW and moved to 107.7 FM creating Q107 and changing the calls to KTBQ. Q107 signed on the air on September 7, 1989, as an adult contemporary format with Jimbo Powers (Jim Kipping) and JJ Hemmingway programming the station as the areas first Hot AC format. Prior to the station's sign on, the station began stunting with a simulated Commodore 64 based robotic voice counting down from 10,077 to 1, and Q107 was born.

In 1991, Ken Williams sold Q107 to George Wilkes and Class Act of Texas. Wilkes made many changes to the station both on and off the air. His changes included changing the station's logo, bringing back Jimbo Powers to program the station (Jimbo had left Q107 a year earlier to pursue an opportunity in Austin), and hiring new account executives when most of the sales staff quit. Wilkes' unfamiliarity with the Lufkin-Nacogdoches radio market, a new and relatively inexperienced sales staff, and a few bad business decisions resulted in a decreased stream of revenue for the struggling station. Wilkes began to consider satellite/computer automation to the dismay of his on-air talent. After two years of Wilkes' ownership, both Jimbo Powers and Chuck Baker left Q107 to pursue opportunities in other radio markets. As air talent departed and revenue continued to decline, Wilkes was left with little choice other than satellite automation.

In late 1993, Q107 was programmed as a satellite station with services based in Dallas. During this time of automation, Gary Richards continued as news director while George Wilkes recorded weather breaks to keep a local sound in the station. In the fall of 1995, Q107 and sister station KSFA-AM merged with KJCS-FM and KEEE-AM forming Class Act of East Texas with KJCS-FM owners the Vance Family of Beaumont, TX. During the spring of 1997, Q107 switched formats from Soft AC to Classic Rock. The summer of 1997 brought the end of the merger between Q107 and KJCS-FM with the Vance family moving KJCS in the middle of the night leaving George Wilkes with Q107 and KSFA-AM. Wilkes sold Q107 and sister station KSFA-AM in the fall of 1997 to Gulfstar Communications in Lufkin; later transactions put the station under the ownership of first Clear Channel Communications, then Gap Broadcasting, and finally Townsquare Media. Gary Richards and John Moring moved with the station as its last remaining employees after the Wilkes sale. Upon the sale of the station to Gulfstar, Steve Rixx became the stations program director while Gary Richards continued as News and Sports Director. Q107 studios moved to Lufkin, TX in the summer of 1998 and is still there present day.

Most notable personalities on Q107 were Jimbo Powers, JJ Hemmingway, Denny Stone, Shelly Swanzee, Gary Richards, Johnny Walker, Chuck Baker, Jason Pointer, John Swan, Jana Stone, John Moring, Debbie Wylde, Doc Roberts, Eric Raines, Steve Ricks, Walton & Johnson and most recently John Boy & Billy Mark Cunningham in addition to Westwood One's The Lu Valentino Show.

== On-air personalities ==
Weekday personalities include John Boy & Billy (based in Charlotte, North Carolina) mornings, Lisa middays, Jen Austin afternoons, and The Lu Valentino Show (based in Denver, Colorado, Westwood One) evenings. Weekend personalities include Jen Austin midday, plus programs such as Flashback with Bill St. James (based out Chicago, Illinois) on Saturdays and Sunday night shows House of Blues and The Classics.

- General Manager- Johnny Lathrop
