= Lufkin Industries =

American manufacturing company

- Type: Independent
- Industry: Oil and Gas Equipment
- Founded: February 28, 1902
- Headquarters: Missouri City, TX
- Website: Lufkin.com

Lufkin Industries is an American manufacturing company founded in 1902 and headquartered in Missouri City, Texas. The company specializes in providing rod lift products, as well as automated control and optimization equipment and software for the oil and gas industry. Lufkin Industries was an independent entity until its acquisition by GE Oil & Gas in July 2013; GE Oil & Gas subsequently merged with Baker Hughes to form Baker Hughes, a GE Company (BHGE). On June 30, 2020, KPS Capital Partners, LP finalized its acquisition of Lufkin Industries from Baker Hughes, as previously announced.

== History ==
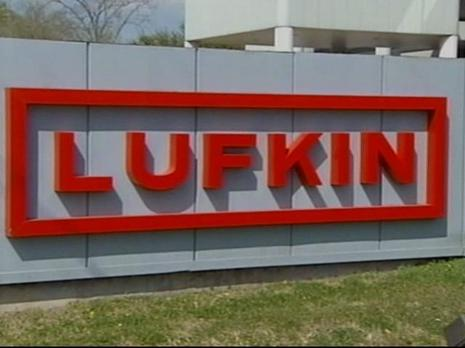
Lufkin Industries corporate sign in Lufkin

In 1902, The Lufkin Foundry and Machine Company was founded in Lufkin, Texas in 1902 to operate a machine shop to repair sawmill machinery. The company soon began manufacturing sawmill equipment and repairing locomotives. As the lumber industry declined in East Texas, the company expanded into the manufacture of oil drilling and refinery equipment. In the 1930s the company established an iron foundry and began manufacturing truck trailers and gears for industrial equipment. During World War II, the company specialized in manufacturing gears for use in military vehicles. After the war, sales of oil equipment slowed, but sales of trailers and industrial gears did better. The company had conflicts with organized labor in the 1950s and much of the 1960s. In 1970 the company's name was changed to Lufkin Industries, and three divisions were established: Machinery, Trailer, and Automotive/Industrial Supplies. The company prospered in the 1970s, growing to 3,800 employees and annual sales of over $364 million by the early 1980s.

In 2013, Lufkin was acquired by General Electric for $3.3 billion. On June 30, 2020, Lufkin once again became an independent company with Baker Hughes divesting its Rod Lift Systems business. The former Lufkin Power Transmission Division (Lufkin Gears LLC www.lufkingears.com) remains with Baker Hughes as an Independent Business Line under its Turbomachinery & Process Solutions product company.

== Operations ==
=== Oil equipment ===
Lufkin's main focus is in the oil and gas equipment industry. Lufkin produces fully automated rod lifts and other forms of artificial lift that are designed to extract oil and natural gas from hard to reach oil reservoirs.
