= Angelina County Airport =

American airport

- IATA: LFK; ICAO: KLFK; FAA LID: LFK

Summary
- Airport type: Public
- Owner: Angelina County
- Serves: Lufkin, Texas
- Elevation AMSL: 296 ft (90 m)
- Coordinates: 31°14′02″N 094°45′00″W
- Website: www.angelinacounty.net/...

Map
- Location within Texas

Runways
Direction	Length		Surface
Direction	ft	m	Surface
7/25	5,398	1,645	Asphalt
16/34	4,309	1,313	Asphalt

Statistics (2008)
- Aircraft operations: 18,500
- Based aircraft: 72
- Source: Federal Aviation Administration

Angelina County Airport (IATA: LFK, ICAO: KLFK, FAA LID: LFK) is a county-owned, public-use airport in Angelina County, Texas, United States. The airport is located seven nautical miles (13 km) southwest of the central business district of Lufkin, Texas.

== Facilities and aircraft ==
Angelina County Airport covers an area of 385 acres (156 ha) at an elevation of 296 feet (90 m) above mean sea level. It has two asphalt paved runways: 7/25 is 5,398 by 100 feet (1,645 x 30 m) and 15/33 is 4,309 by 100 feet (1,313 x 30 m).

For the 12-month period ending July 11, 2008, the airport had 18,500 aircraft operations, an average of 50 per day: 97% general aviation and 3% military. At that time there were 72 aircraft based at this airport: 75% single-engine, 17% multi-engine, 6% jet, 1% helicopter and 1% ultralight.

== Historical airline service ==
Trans-Texas Airways (TTa) and its successor Texas International Airlines served Lufkin with scheduled passenger air service for over 27 years. In the fall of 1949, Houston-based TTa was operating 21-seat Douglas DC-3 aircraft (which the airline called the "Starliner") into the airport six times a day with all flights operating three daily round trip routings of Houston Hobby Airport - Galveston - Beaumont/Port Arthur - Lufkin - Palestine, TX - Dallas Love Field. By the summer of 1968, TTa was still serving Lufkin with the DC-3 in addition to operating other flights with 40-seat Convair 600 turboprop aircraft. The airline was operating four flights a day into the airport at this time with two nonstops to Houston Hobby Airport and two direct flights to Dallas Love Field via stops in Longview, TX and Tyler, TX. TTa then changed its name to Texas International Airlines which in the summer of 1970 was operating 15-seat Beechcraft 99 commuter turboprops into Lufkin with nonstop service to Houston Intercontinental Airport (IAH) and direct flights to Dallas Love Field (DAL) via Longview and Tyler. By the spring of 1974, Texas International had replaced the smaller Beechcraft aircraft and was operating two flights a day from the airport with larger Convair 600 turboprops with direct service to Dallas/Fort Worth International Airport (DFW) via stops in Longview and Tyler. Texas International then ceased serving Lufkin during the mid-1970s and the air carrier was eventually merged into Continental Airlines.

Several commuter airlines served Lufkin in the past as well. In early 1976, Metroflight Airlines, a division of Clear Lake City, TX-based Metro Airlines, was serving Lufkin with six flights a day operated with de Havilland Canada DHC-6 Twin Otter twin turboprop aircraft. Three nonstop flights a day were operated to both Houston Intercontinental Airport (IAH) and nearby Nacogdoches, TX (OCH) with two of these flights to Nacogdoches continuing on to Dallas/Fort Worth International Airport (DFW) via stops in Longview (GGG) and Tyler (TYR). In the spring of 1981, Abilene, TX-based Chaparral Airlines was operating three nonstop flights a day to Dallas/Ft. Worth (DFW) with Beechcraft 99 commuter propjets. By 1994, the closest scheduled airline service was being flown from nearby airport (OCH) by Lone Star Airlines with nonstop service to Dallas/Fort Worth (DFW) and also nonstop to Natchez, MS (HEZ) with these flights being operated with Fairchild Swearingen Metroliner commuter propjets.

The airport currently does not have any scheduled passenger airline service.

== See also ==
- List of airports in Texas
