= KAFX-FM =

Coordinates: 31.408°N 94.765°W

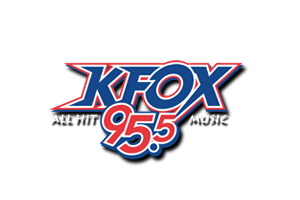
- Diboll, Texas; United States
- Broadcast area: Lufkin-Nacogdoches
- Frequency: 95.5 MHz
- Branding: 95.5 K-FOX

Programming
- Format: Top 40 (CHR)
- Affiliations: Compass Media Networks; Premiere Networks; Westwood One

Ownership
- Owner: Townsquare Media; (Townsquare License, LLC)
- Sister stations: KYKS; KSFA; KTBQ

History
- First air date: June 28, 1960 (as KSPL-FM)
- Former call signs: KSPL-FM (1960-1981); KIPR-FM (1981-1986)
- Call sign meaning: "Kay-Fox" (branding)

Technical information
- Facility ID: 18105
- Class: C1
- ERP: 100,000 watts
- HAAT: 173 meters (568 ft)

Links
- Webcast: Listen live
- Website: kfox95.com

KAFX-FM (95.5 MHz, "95.5 K-FOX") is a Townsquare Media radio station, licensed to Diboll, Texas, featuring a top 40 (CHR) format in the Lufkin and Nacogdoches areas.
