= KSML-FM =

- Huntington, Texas; United States
- Broadcast area: Lufkin-Nacogdoches
- Frequency: 101.9 MHz
- Branding: Super Mix 101.9

Programming
- Format: Spanish Variety

Ownership
- Owner: Kasa Family Limited Partnership

History
- First air date: 1996
- Former call signs: KYBI (1996–2005)
- Call sign meaning: Super Mix Lufkin

Technical information
- Licensing authority: FCC
- Facility ID: 33394
- Class: C2
- ERP: 15,000 watts
- HAAT: 252 m (827 ft)
- Transmitter coordinates: 31°20′5.00″N 94°40′10.00″W

Links
- Public license information: Public file; LMS
- Website: KSML-FM on Facebook

KSML-FM (101.9 FM) is a radio station broadcasting a Spanish Variety music format. Licensed to Huntington, Texas, United States, the station serves the Lufkin-Nacogdoches area. The station is currently owned by Kasa Family Limited Partnership.

== History ==
The station was assigned the call letters KYBI on 1996-01-29.

In the 1990s KYBI had an all-70s format that played a lot of classic rock. Around 1999, KYBI changed formats to hot AC as “Y-101.9”. This lasted until 2005 when Stephen Yares moved the populat Regional Mexican format from AM 1260 KSML to FM as “Super Mix 101.9.”

On 2005-02-15, the station changed its call sign to the current KSML-FM.
