= List of United States tornadoes from April to June 2021 =

List of tornadoes in the United States

United States tornadoes from April to June 2021
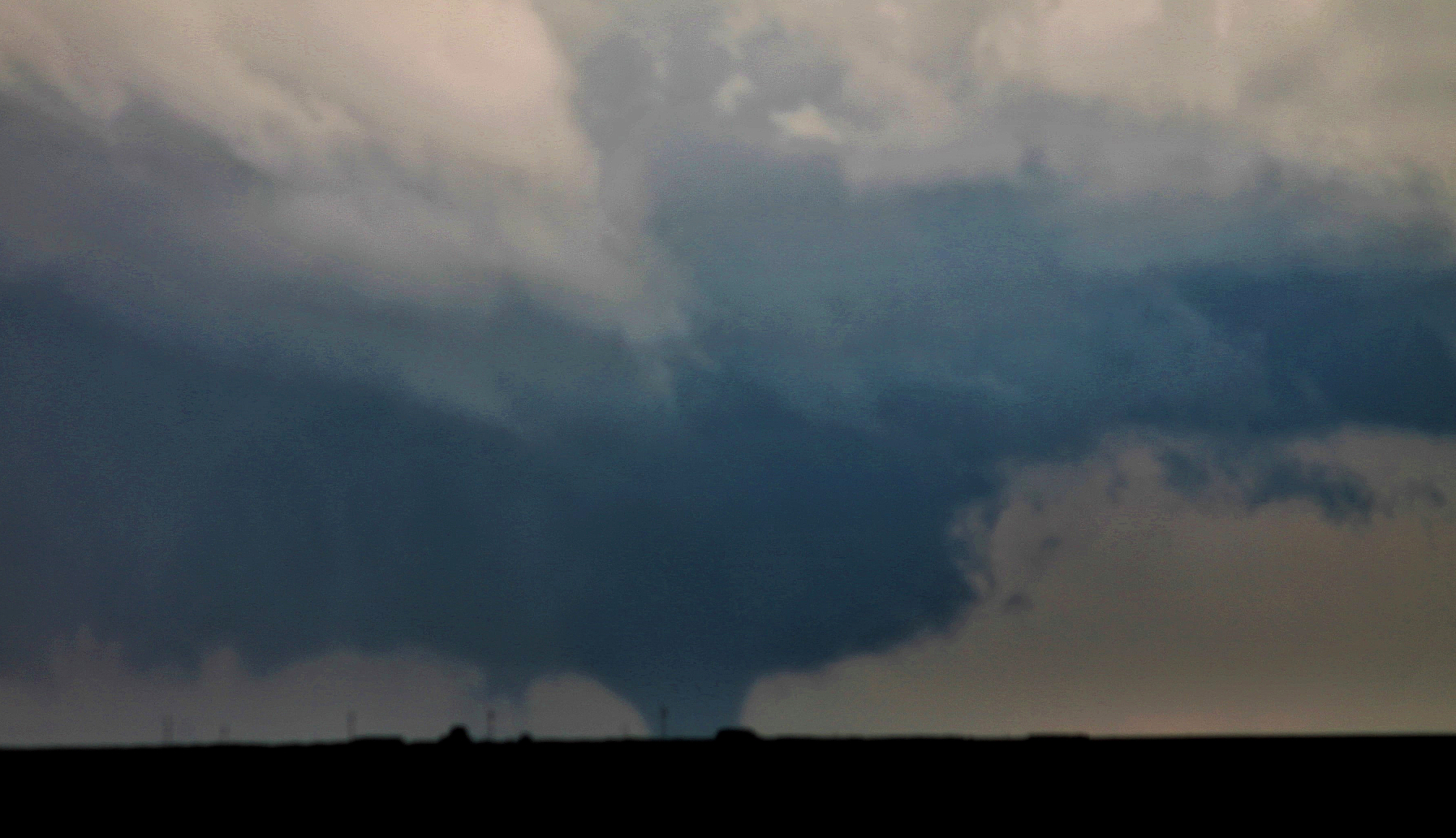
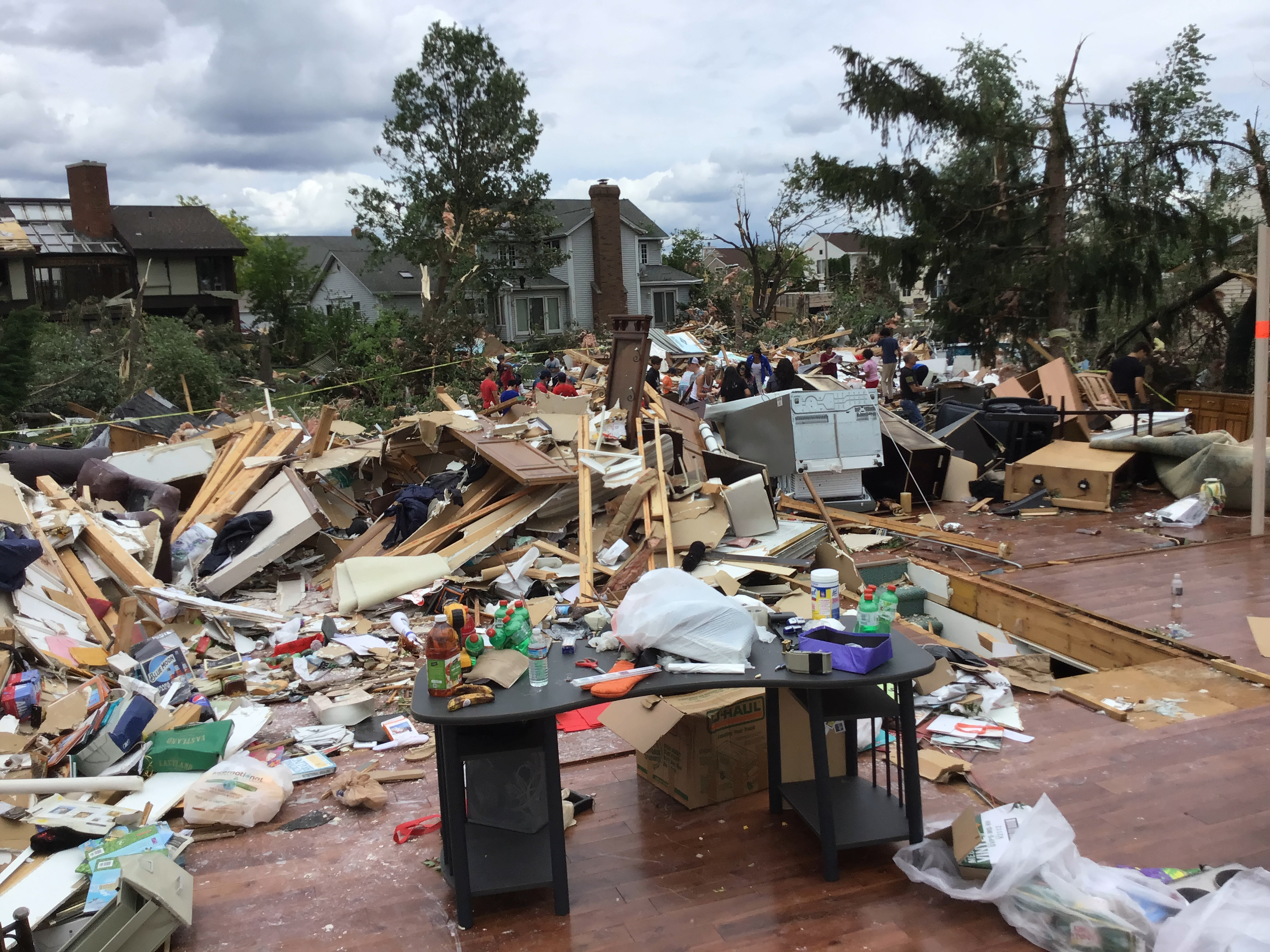
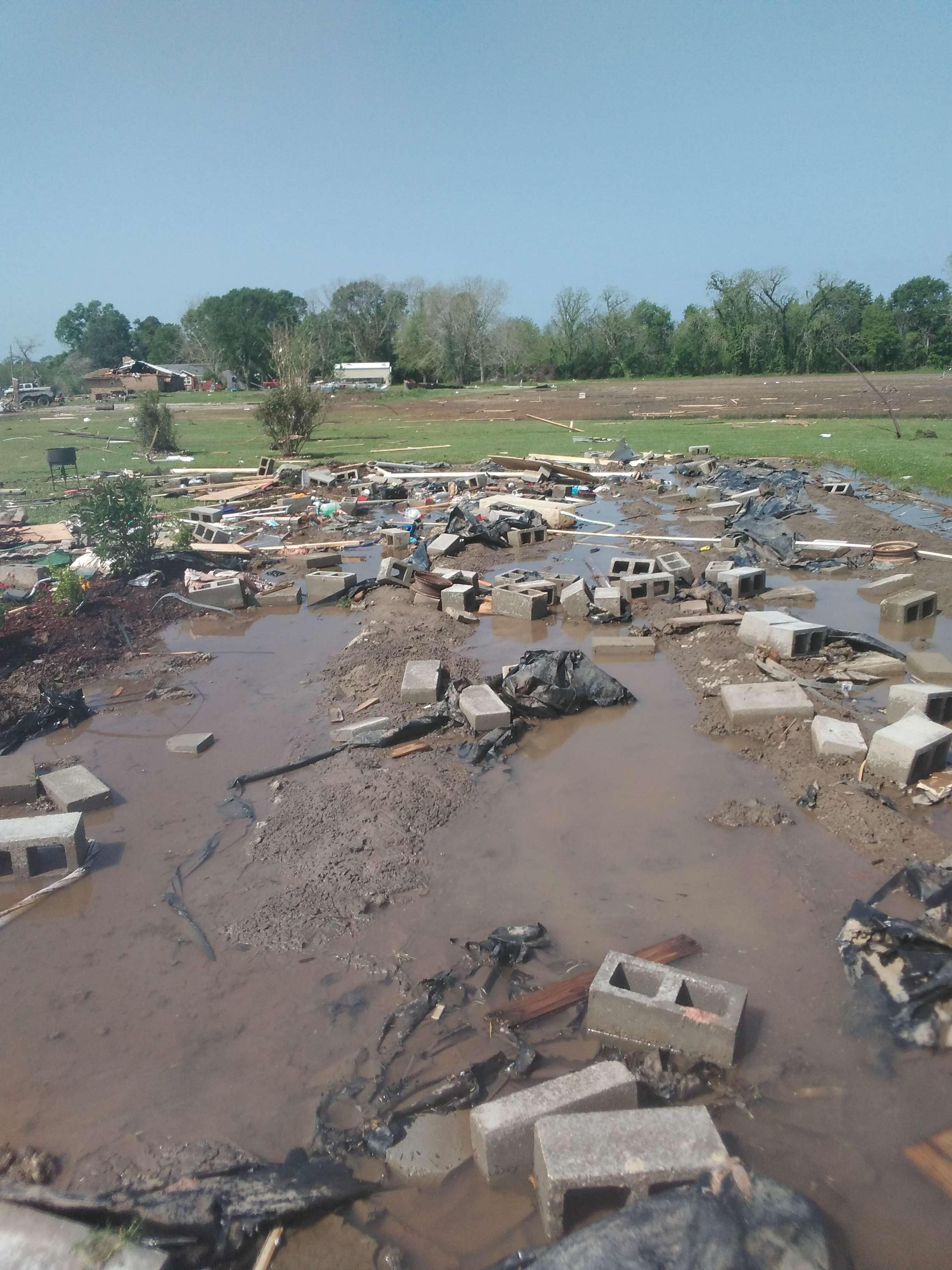
- Clockwise from top: A multi-vortex EF0 tornado near Punkin Center, Colorado on May 22; A mobile home destroyed by an EF3 tornado in Waxia, Louisiana on April 10; A home swept away after a deadly EF3 tornado struck Naperville, Illinois on June 20.
- Timespan: April 7 – June 29
- Maximum rated tornado: EF3 tornado: Waxia, Louisiana on April 10; Truscott, Texas on April 27; Woodridge, Illinois on June 20
- Tornadoes: 444
- Fatalities: 1
- Injuries: 65

This page documents all tornadoes confirmed by various weather forecast offices of the National Weather Service in the United States from April to June 2021. On average, there are 155 confirmed tornadoes in the United States in April, 276 confirmed tornadoes in May, and 243 confirmed tornadoes in June.

Overall, the spring and early summer period was below average for tornado activity in the United States and most tornadoes were weak. April was well below average with only 79 tornadoes, the quietest April since 1992. May saw quite a few more tornadoes than April and was near average with 259 tornadoes but with no EF3 or stronger tornadoes. June was also significantly below average with 106 tornadoes.

== United States yearly total ==
Confirmed tornadoes by Enhanced Fujita rating
EFU	EF0	EF1	EF2	EF3	EF4	EF5	Total
210	545	433	103	21	3	0	1,315

== April ==
Confirmed tornadoes by Enhanced Fujita rating
EFU	EF0	EF1	EF2	EF3	EF4	EF5	Total
14	28	30	5	2	0	0	79

=== April 7 event ===
List of confirmed tornadoes – Wednesday, April 7, 2021 (Note: All dates are based on the local time zone where the tornado touched down; however, all times are in Coordinated Universal Time for consistency.)
EF#	Location	County / Parish	State	Start Coord.	Time (UTC)	Path length	Max width
EF1	SW of Doyline	Bossier	LA	32.3824°N 93.4585°W	21:33–21:35	0.9 mi (1.4 km)	50 yd (46 m)
EF1	A section of metal roofing on a mobile home was lifted. Trees and tree limbs were snapped.						
EF1	W of Hall Summit to S of Ringgold	Red River, Bienville	LA	32.1803°N 93.4805°W	21:35–21:58	13.25 mi (21.32 km)	300 yd (270 m)
EF1	The tornado snapped and uprooted trees as it touched down along LA 1 near Westdale. As the tornado moved northeast, it crossed the Red River, LA 515, and US 71. Several more trees were snapped before the tornado lifted along US 371.						
EF0	SE of Downsville	Ouachita	LA	32.5509°N 92.3982°W	23:48–23:51	2.81 mi (4.52 km)	50 yd (46 m)
EF0	Minor tree damage occurred, and roofing material was found lightly scattered along the track. A tornado debris signature was visible on the University of Louisiana Monroe Radar.						
EF1	N of Bastrop	Morehouse	LA	32.8041°N 91.9498°W	00:30–00:43	8.16 mi (13.13 km)	75 yd (69 m)
EF1	One house lost its entire roof and its attached garage was heavily damaged, several other homes and a large barn were damaged, and numerous trees were downed. One person was injured.						
EF1	E of Bonita	Morehouse	LA	32.9184°N 91.5672°W	01:06–01:10	2.69 mi (4.33 km)	200 yd (180 m)
EF1	Sheets of metal from a tin awning were tossed into a field. An attached garage near a home lost most of a wall, while the home suffered minor roof damage. An outbuilding had its door blown in. Trees were snapped or uprooted along the path.						
EF1	NE of Concord, LA to ENE of Kilbourne, LA	West Carroll (LA), Chicot (AR)	LA, AR	32.9729°N 91.4225°W	01:16–01:30	9.21 mi (14.82 km)	50 yd (46 m)
EF1	A metal building sustained significant damage, including the roof being removed, several homes suffered roof damage, and a central pivot irrigation system was destroyed. An outbuilding was completely destroyed, several other structures were damaged, and a second central pivot irrigation system was flipped over. Several trees were downed.						
EF0	SW of Eudora	Chicot	AR	33.0679°N 91.3749°W	01:24–01:27	2.63 mi (4.23 km)	50 yd (46 m)
EF0	Numerous trees were downed, and a flag pole was bent over.						
EF0	WSW of Cedar Rapids	Linn	IA	41.9559°N 91.7399°W	01:36–01:37	0.65 mi (1.05 km)	40 yd (37 m)
EF0	One manufactured home had significant roof damage. Other manufactured homes had siding damage. One person was injured after a window blew in.						
EF1	NE of Lecompte	Rapides	LA	31.1309°N 92.3732°W	02:13–02:16	0.88 mi (1.42 km)	200 yd (180 m)
EF1	A mobile home was rolled over, a barn sustained roof damage, and several trees were snapped.						
EF1	NNE of Mansura	Avoyelles	LA	31.0811°N 92.0540°W	02:52–02:55	1.79 mi (2.88 km)	200 yd (180 m)
EF1	A school sustained roof and wall damage, infrastructure at the school's ball fields was destroyed, and many trees were snapped or uprooted.						
EF1	E of Bordelonville	Avoyelles	LA	31.0972°N 91.8683°W	03:16–03:20	3.42 mi (5.50 km)	200 yd (180 m)
EF1	A house and several barns and outbuildings lost their roofs, and several trees were snapped or uprooted.						

=== April 8 event ===
List of confirmed tornadoes – Thursday, April 8, 2021
EF#	Location	County / Parish	State	Start Coord.	Time (UTC)	Path length	Max width
EF0	ENE of Watson	Livingston	LA	30.6°N 90.85°W	06:20–06:21	0.12 mi (0.19 km)	25 yd (23 m)
EF0	A brief tornado tore most of the roof off a house, as well as the carport. Two nearby building sustained damage to their tin roofs. Debris was scattered around a quarter mile to the northeast.						
EF0	N of Pearlington	Hancock	MS	30.3601°N 89.6124°W	08:26–08:27	0.71 mi (1.14 km)	75 yd (69 m)
EF0	A brief tornado knocked down trees and a guard gate at Stennis Space Center.						
EF0	Pleasant Hill to ESE of Mayland	Cumberland	TN	35.97°N 85.2°W	20:15–20:25	5.8 mi (9.3 km)	125 yd (114 m)
EF0	Pleasant Hill Elementary School, a nursing home, and other structures in Pleasant Hill sustained partial roof loss, broken windows, and siding damage. A shed was rolled into the wall of one house, and several other homes sustained mainly minor roof damage. Numerous trees were downed along the path.						
EF0	WSW of Norma	Scott	TN	36.3112°N 84.4537°W	22:07–22:10	2.63 mi (4.23 km)	200 yd (180 m)
EF0	Several trees were downed along an intermittent path.						
EF2	NW of Norma	Scott	TN	36.3392°N 84.397°W	22:12–22:14	1.31 mi (2.11 km)	300 yd (270 m)
EF2	Many large hardwood trees were snapped or uprooted, and a home sustained minor roof damage.						
EF2	NNE of Norma	Scott	TN	36.3593°N 84.3747°W	22:15–22:18	1.84 mi (2.96 km)	200 yd (180 m)
EF2	In the Straight Fork area, a double-wide mobile home and a garage were completely destroyed, and two houses sustained significant roof damage. A 14,000 lb (6,400 kg) camper was overturned and moved 30 yards (27 m) as well. Numerous trees were downed along the path.						

=== April 9 event ===
List of confirmed tornadoes – Friday, April 9, 2021
EF#	Location	County / Parish	State	Start Coord.	Time (UTC)	Path length	Max width
EF1	Kosciusko	Attala	MS	33.0658°N 89.5903°W	01:04–01:05	0.92 mi (1.48 km)	250 yd (230 m)
EF1	One house had part of its roof and ceiling blown out, and a CVS pharmacy lost an awning and sign. Several other homes in town sustained roof damage from falling trees and branches. Trees were uprooted and snapped.						
EF0	ESE of Brandon to N of Pelahatchie	Rankin	MS	32.2509°N 89.8439°W	01:28–01:56	11.02 mi (17.73 km)	50 yd (46 m)
EF0	A weak tornado with an intermittent damage path was caught on camera by several storm chasers. Numerous trees were snapped or uprooted along the path.						
EF1	SW of Ashdown	Little River	AR	33.6219°N 94.2196°W	04:31–04:33	2.42 mi (3.89 km)	150 yd (140 m)
EF1	A tornado embedded within a much larger area of straight-line winds produced a concentrated area of tree damage as well as minimal structural damage just south of Richmond. The path possibly extended longer into an area inaccessible by road.						
EF1	WSW of Brookhaven	Lincoln	MS	31.5705°N 90.5493°W	04:37–04:46	4.37 mi (7.03 km)	530 yd (480 m)
EF1	Many trees were downed along the path, with a couple causing damage to a shed. A few outbuildings were heavily damaged or destroyed, and several other structures sustained roof damage. Several power poles and lines were downed as well.						

=== April 10 event ===
List of confirmed tornadoes – Saturday, April 10, 2021
EF#	Location	County / Parish	State	Start Coord.	Time (UTC)	Path length	Max width
EF1	NE of Salem to WSW of Columbia	Marion	MS	31.2976°N 90.0131°W	05:31–05:42	7.64 mi (12.30 km)	1,200 yd (1,100 m)
EF1	This large tornado was embedded in a swath of damaging winds. There was a concentrated area of tree damage along the path, with some trees falling onto homes. The roofs of several sheds and carports were removed.						
EF1	S of Big Cane to WNW of Palmetto	St. Landry	LA	30.7272°N 92.032°W	06:26–06:35	3.64 mi (5.86 km)	187 yd (171 m)
EF1	A barn was destroyed. Most of the damage was otherwise limited to trees. The path was lost near LA 361.						
EF3	NE of Washington to NE of Palmetto	St. Landry	LA	30.6660°N 91.9586°W	07:06–07:18	8.71 mi (14.02 km)	200 yd (180 m)
EF3	1 death – This low-end EF3 tornado touched down along LA 359, causing major damage in Waxia as it moved northeast. It weakened as it crossed US 71 before moving through the eastern edge of Palmetto and crossing over LA 10 near Danks. The tornado than dissipated to the northeast along LA 360. Fifteen homes and mobile homes were either heavily damaged or completely destroyed, with debris scattered long distances. Vehicles were flipped and tossed into fields, and barns and outbuildings were also destroyed. A single-wide mobile home was rolled over 320 yards (290 m) away and obliterated, resulting in a fatality. A double-wide mobile home nearby was rolled over 100 yards (91 m), and a home on pilings was moved around 50 yards (46 m), resulting in injuries to five occupants. Numerous trees and power lines were downed along the path. Seven people were injured in total. This tornado also caused $1,000,000 in damages.						
EF1	NW of Defuniak Springs	Walton	FL	30.7845°N 86.3640°W	11:23–11:40	15.76 mi (25.36 km)	100 yd (91 m)
EF1	Numerous trees were snapped, and barns and outbuildings sustained roof damage.						
EF2	Laguna Beach	Bay	FL	30.2347°N 85.9177°W	13:42–13:44	0.45 mi (0.72 km)	100 yd (91 m)
EF2	A strong waterspout moved onshore, tore the roof from a convenience store, and partially collapsed one of its exterior walls. A nearby house also suffered partial roof loss and was heavily damaged by debris from the convenience store roof. Other homes had roof damage, siding ripped off, broken windows, and the collapse of one carport. A garage and a screened in porch were destroyed, and a piece of debris was lodged into one home. Fences were also blown down, including one that a shed was rolled into.						
EF0	Gulf Lagoon Beach	Bay	FL	30.1660°N 85.7952°W	13:45–13:47	0.5 mi (0.80 km)	25 yd (23 m)
EF0	A waterspout moved onshore near the southeastern edge of the Panama City Beach city limits. Video shows the tornado tossing patio furniture.						
EF1	Lynn Haven	Bay	FL	30.2353°N 85.6503°W	14:00–14:03	0.25 mi (0.40 km)	30 yd (27 m)
EF1	An automotive business had its roof lifted and rotated about 30° before being dropped back onto the structure. Nearby homes sustained minor roof damage. The tornado was embedded in a wider swath of straight-line wind damage.						
EF0	W of Tallahassee	Leon	FL	30.373°N 84.529°W	15:28–15:31	2.39 mi (3.85 km)	25 yd (23 m)
EF0	A brief tornado damaged trees in a forested area west of Tallahassee. A debris signature was visible on radar.						
EF0	SSE of Cutlerville	Kent	MI	42.7844°N 85.6384°W	20:18–20:19	0.55 mi (0.89 km)	65 yd (59 m)
EF0	About a dozen homes were damaged by a brief tornado. One home had a small part of its roofing blown off, siding was removed from two more homes, and a garage door was pushed in. At least two vehicles were damaged by flying debris, including lawn furniture that was thrown by the tornado.						
EF1	W of Bayshore Gardens	Manatee	FL	27.4364°N 82.6084°W	21:45-21:46	0.51 mi (0.82 km)	50 yd (46 m)
EF1	A brief tornado snapped tree limbs, caused superficial damage to 20 homes, and inflicted major roof damage to a 5-unit townhome. A woman was injured by falling debris in one home.						
EF1	NW of Seneca	Oconee	SC	34.707°N 82.992°W	21:50–21:52	1.23 mi (1.98 km)	20 yd (18 m)
EF1	A radio tower was partially toppled, and a business lost about 20 percent of its roof. A car was flipped in front of the business, and several hardwood trees were snapped or uprooted.						
EF0	NE of Reidville	Spartanburg	SC	34.877°N 82.051°W	22:38–22:40	1.13 mi (1.82 km)	20 yd (18 m)
EF0	A house lost part of its roof and porch covering, with debris being scattered, and a few trees were downed.						
EF0	SE of Forest City	Rutherford	NC	35.242°N 81.823°W	23:21–23:22	0.07 mi (0.11 km)	20 yd (18 m)
EF0	A brief tornado swirled fallen trees and other debris around a house, which sustained minor structural damage. Another house lost shingles, and trees were knocked down in a convergent pattern.						
EF0	N of Dysartsville	McDowell	NC	35.667°N 81.86°W	00:10–00:11	0.59 mi (0.95 km)	20 yd (18 m)
EF0	A mobile home suffered damage to its underpinning and had a window partially blown out. A shed lost its roof, and trees were snapped or uprooted.						

=== April 11 event ===
List of confirmed tornadoes – Sunday, April 11, 2021
EF#	Location	County / Parish	State	Start Coord.	Time (UTC)	Path length	Max width
EF1	N of Belvoir	Pitt	NC	35.729°N 77.462°W	07:35–07:36	0.52 mi (0.84 km)	50 yd (46 m)
EF1	A large metal outbuilding was severely damaged, several other outbuildings were damaged, and a house sustained significant roof and wall damage. Several trees were snapped or uprooted along the path.						
EF0	NW of Eagle Lake	Polk	FL	27.999°N 81.7849°W	16:18–16:19	1.44 mi (2.32 km)	50 yd (46 m)
EF0	A few trees were downed near Spirit Lake and Eagle Lake.						

=== April 18 event ===
List of confirmed tornadoes – Sunday, April 18, 2021
EF#	Location	County / Parish	State	Start Coord.	Time (UTC)	Path length	Max width
EF1	Ocala	Marion	FL	29.1861°N 82.1836°W	23:21–23:25	2.27 mi (3.65 km)	440 yd (400 m)
EF1	A tornado touched down near Interstate 75 and moved east-southeast toward downtown Ocala. A large warehouse was damaged, street signs were twisted and pulled out of the ground, power lines were downed, and a large oak tree was blown down.						

=== April 21 event ===
List of confirmed tornadoes – Wednesday, April 21, 2021
EF#	Location	County / Parish	State	Start Coord.	Time (UTC)	Path length	Max width
EF1	Amenia	Dutchess	NY	41.8413°N 73.5582°W	18:49–18:51	0.64 mi (1.03 km)	100 yd (91 m)
EF1	One home had roof damage, and had a wooden 2x4 and a tree branch driven into a side of the home. Several other homes were damaged.						
EF0	SW of Kent	Litchfield	CT	41.6877°N 73.5052°W	18:49–18:51	1 mi (1.6 km)	30 yd (27 m)
EF0	Trees were snapped or uprooted and part of a wooden fence was damaged. A car tent canopy was blown away.						

=== April 23 event ===
List of confirmed tornadoes – Friday, April 23, 2021
EF#	Location	County / Parish	State	Start Coord.	Time (UTC)	Path length	Max width
EFU	NNW of Turkey	Hall	TX	34.4454°N 100.9215°W	22:22–22:28	0.67 mi (1.08 km)	50 yd (46 m)
EFU	A brief tornado was observed north of Turkey. A game camera captured the tornado damaging trees and deer blinds.						
EFU	E of Copper Breaks State Park	Hardeman	TX	34.13°N 99.73°W	22:43–22:52	2.8 mi (4.5 km)	50 yd (46 m)
EFU	Numerous storm chasers witnessed a tornado in southern Hardeman County. A cattle feeder was damaged in a rural area.						
EFU	SW of Medicine Mound	Hardeman	TX	34.13°N 99.66°W	22:54–22:55	0.2 mi (0.32 km)	30 yd (27 m)
EFU	A brief tornado was observed southwest of Medicine Mound. No known damage occurred.						
EFU	SE of Medicine Mound	Hardeman	TX	34.1°N 99.51°W	23:08–23:12	1.8 mi (2.9 km)	50 yd (46 m)
EFU	A brief tornado was observed in far southeastern Hardeman County. No known damage occurred.						
EF2	WNW of Lockett	Hardeman, Wilbarger	TX	34.11°N 99.49°W	23:10–23:22	6.4 mi (10.3 km)	400 yd (370 m)
EF2	A home on a farmstead was significantly damaged, and outbuildings were heavily damaged or destroyed. Vehicles and farm equipment were displaced, including a pick-up truck that was truck thrown 100 yd (91 m). Power poles were snapped as well.						
EF1	ESE of Lockett	Wilbarger	TX	34.077°N 99.334°W	23:34–23:42	3.2 mi (5.1 km)	300 yd (270 m)
EF1	One home had significant roof damage. Trees, power poles, a fence, and outbuildings were also damaged.						

=== April 24 event ===
List of confirmed tornadoes – Saturday, April 24, 2021
EF#	Location	County / Parish	State	Start Coord.	Time (UTC)	Path length	Max width
EF1	ESE of Tumbleton	Henry	AL	31.3984°N 85.2407°W	12:50–12:55	4.09 mi (6.58 km)	150 yd (140 m)
EF1	A mobile home was flipped, injuring two people. There was minor damage to roofs and an outbuilding was damaged, and numerous trees were uprooted and snapped.						
EF0	SSW of Columbia	Houston	AL	31.2399°N 85.17°W	12:51–12:52	0.42 mi (0.68 km)	100 yd (91 m)
EF0	A brief tornado peeled about half of the metal roofing from one house, and caused minor roof damage to another. Trees were also damaged.						
EF1	WNW to N of Blakely	Early	GA	31.3981°N 85.049°W	12:59–13:07	7.02 mi (11.30 km)	150 yd (140 m)
EF1	A camper and an outbuilding were destroyed, and a mobile home sustained minor damage. There was also roof damage and sporadic tree damage along the path.						
EF0	SSW of Sawhatchee	Early	GA	31.2595°N 85.0335°W	13:01–13:02	4.41 mi (7.10 km)	75 yd (69 m)
EF0	The tornado caused sporadic tree damage and minor structural damage.						
EF1	Doverel	Terrell	GA	31.7064°N 84.5203°W	13:30–13:31	0.93 mi (1.50 km)	100 yd (91 m)
EF1	Large trees were snapped or uprooted by this brief tornado. An outbuilding sustained minor damage as well.						
EF2	SW of Douglas	Coffee	GA	31.4524°N 83.0035°W	01:03–01:18	8.15 mi (13.12 km)	360 yd (330 m)
EF2	Several homes had large portions of their roofs torn off, one of which was shifted off its foundation. Outbuildings were destroyed, and numerous trees were snapped or uprooted, some of which landed on homes.						

=== April 25 event ===
List of confirmed tornadoes – Sunday, April 25, 2021
EF#	Location	County / Parish	State	Start Coord.	Time (UTC)	Path length	Max width
EF0	S of Flagler Beach	Flagler	FL	29.4247°N 81.1268°W	11:09-11:10	0.25 mi (0.40 km)	100 yd (91 m)
EF0	A lamp post was damaged, a few small trees were downed, and lawn furniture was blown into a canal.						
EF0	NNE of Orland	Tehama	CA	39.8205°N 122.1381°W	00:45–01:00	2.02 mi (3.25 km)	50 yd (46 m)
EF0	This weak, intermittent tornado touched down twice. The first touchdown, confirmed by video showing a dust whirl, was in an open field and lasted about 15 seconds and did not produce any damage. At the site of the second touchdown, two homes lost roof tiles, a carport lost its roof, sheds were damaged, and about 40 orchard trees were uprooted or lost limbs.						

=== April 27 event ===
List of confirmed tornadoes – Tuesday, April 27, 2021
EF#	Location	County / Parish	State	Start Coord.	Time (UTC)	Path length	Max width
EF0	SE of Kutch	Lincoln	CO	38.85°N 103.83°W	20:32–20:33	0.01 mi (0.016 km)	50 yd (46 m)
EF0	A brief tornado that caused no damage was confirmed by storm chaser photos and videos.						
EF3	NW of Truscott	Knox	TX	33.751°N 99.921°W	20:49–21:05	8.4 mi (13.5 km)	400 yd (370 m)
EF3	A semi-truck was blown over and a 4,000 lb (1,800 kg) cattle feeder was thrown 850 ft (260 m) by this strong multiple-vortex tornado. The most intense damage was inflicted to several large metal electrical pylons, which were bent to the ground. Mesquite trees were damaged, and a couple of structures sustained roof and window damage.						
EF0	SE of Karval	Lincoln	CO	38.64°N 103.25°W	21:57-21:58	0.01 mi (0.016 km)	50 yd (46 m)
EF0	A tornado briefly touched down in an open field. No damage was observed.						
EFU	N of Haswell	Cheyenne	CO	38.6155°N 103.1625°W	22:08-22:18	2.04 mi (3.28 km)	100 yd (91 m)
EFU	A tornado was observed by a storm chaser. This was the first of several tornadoes that occurred in quick succession in southwestern Cheynne County.						
EFU	N of Haswell	Cheyenne	CO	38.6226°N 103.1092°W	22:08-22:11	0.78 mi (1.26 km)	50 yd (46 m)
EFU	This tornado occurred simultaneously with the previous, larger tornado. This was the second tornado produced by a storm in southwestern Cheyenne County.						
EFU	NNE of Haswell	Cheyenne	CO	38.6185°N 103.1028°W	22:15-22:17	1.97 mi (3.17 km)	75 yd (69 m)
EFU	A brief satellite tornado was observed. This was the third tornado produced by a storm in southwestern Cheyenne County.						
EFU	NNE of Haswell	Cheyenne	CO	38.6175°N 103.1057°W	22:16-22:25	4.05 mi (6.52 km)	300 yd (270 m)
EFU	A large tornado was observed tracking across open country. This was the fourth tornado produced by a storm in southwestern Cheyenne County.						
EFU	S of Wild Horse	Cheyenne	CO	38.6702°N 103.0267°W	22:28-22:32	1.31 mi (2.11 km)	100 yd (91 m)
EFU	A brief tornado was observed by a storm chaser. This was the fifth and final tornado produced by a storm in southwestern Cheyenne County.						
EFU	W of Kit Carson	Cheyenne	CO	38.756°N 102.8951°W	22:54-23:00	4.48 mi (7.21 km)	50 yd (46 m)
EFU	A tornado was observed crossing US 40 west of Kit Carson.						
EFU	NE of Kit Carson	Cheyenne	CO	38.954°N 102.6085°W	23:27-23:34	1.93 mi (3.11 km)	75 yd (69 m)
EFU	A landspout was observed in northern Cheyenne County.						
EF0	S of Hollister	Tillman	OK	34.21°N 98.89°W	00:15	0.1 mi (0.16 km)	20 yd (18 m)
EF0	A storm chaser observed a brief tornado 9 miles south of Hollister. No damage was reported.						
EFU	SW of Electra	Wilbarger	TX	33.85°N 99.09°W	00:19	0.2 mi (0.32 km)	30 yd (27 m)
EFU	3 storm chasers observed a tornado from a long distance. No damage was reported.						
EF0	SSW of Hermleigh	Scurry	TX	32.5891°N 100.7986°W	00:47-00:52	2.61 mi (4.20 km)	50 yd (46 m)
EF0	A tornado near Hermleigh, Texas was observed by several spotters.						

=== April 28 event ===
List of confirmed tornadoes – Wednesday, April 28, 2021
EF#	Location	County / Parish	State	Start Coord.	Time (UTC)	Path length	Max width
EF1	N of Wynnewood to ENE of Pauls Valley	Garvin	OK	34.70°N 97.172°W	05:00–05:10	4.5 mi (7.2 km)	150 yd (140 m)
EF1	Barns, sheds, and outbuildings were damaged or destroyed by this high-end EF1 tornado. Windows were shattered at one home, power poles were snapped, and trees were snapped or uprooted.						
EFU	W of Stilwell	Adair	OK	35.824°N 94.726°W	11:01–11:04	1.5 mi (2.4 km)	100 yd (91 m)
EFU	A tornado debris signature was observed on radar. The area where the tornado occurred could not be accessed due to a lack of roads. The path length listed is an estimate.						
EF1	NW to NNE of Stilwell	Adair	OK	35.836°N 94.676°W	11:06–11:19	7.1 mi (11.4 km)	225 yd (206 m)
EF1	Trees were uprooted, outbuildings were destroyed, and a home and several chicken houses were damaged.						
EF0	NW of Merriam Woods	Taney	MO	36.7392°N 93.2499°W	14:30–14:31	0.09 mi (0.14 km)	50 yd (46 m)
EF0	A house sustained minor roof damage, and trees were snapped or uprooted.						
EF0	NNW of Merriam Woods	Taney	MO	36.7651°N 93.2058°W	14:37–14:41	0.57 mi (0.92 km)	50 yd (46 m)
EF0	Trees were uprooted, one of which fell on and damaged a home.						
EF0	SW of Chadwick	Christian	MO	36.8677°N 93.1012°W	14:55–14:59	0.42 mi (0.68 km)	50 yd (46 m)
EF0	A shed was blown down, and trees were downed.						
EF1	SSW of Indianola to NW of Crowder	Pittsburg	OK	35.092°N 95.814°W	15:57–16:09	7.4 mi (11.9 km)	300 yd (270 m)
EF1	An outbuilding was destroyed, a home was damaged, and numerous trees were snapped and uprooted.						
EF0	S of Drury	Douglas	MO	36.8423°N 92.3251°W	16:13–16:19	1.88 mi (3.03 km)	100 yd (91 m)
EF0	Two houses sustained roof and siding damage, a garage and several outbuildings were destroyed, and tree limbs were broken.						
EF1	S of Patton	Bollinger	MO	37.4361°N 90.0159°W	19:50–19:58	3.37 mi (5.42 km)	225 yd (206 m)
EF1	A small shed was blown away, a mobile home lost shingles and underpinning, and a garage lost shingles. Two trailers were overturned and farm items were blown around. Thousands of trees were uprooted along the path.						
EF1	NE of Paris to SE of Buchanan	Henry	TN	36.3642°N 88.2582°W	23:53–00:09	6.71 mi (10.80 km)	400 yd (370 m)
EF1	A large metal building and a storage shed were destroyed, several homes sustained roof damage, and several mobile homes were damaged, including two that were rolled onto their sides. An event venue lost its roof, and trees were downed. One person was injured.						
EF1	SE of Hondo	Medina	TX	29.2992°N 99.1021°W	00:33–00:41	1.82 mi (2.93 km)	600 yd (550 m)
EF1	A high-end EF1 tornado embedded in a larger swath of 80–110 mph (130–180 km/h) thunderstorm wind damage destroyed a mobile home and a barn. Another mobile home, a barn, and a house sustained significant roof damage. Trees and power lines were downed, an irrigation pivot was flipped, and an anchored hunting tower was knocked over. The same storm also produced a 6.4-inch-diameter (16 cm) hailstone in Hondo, the largest ever recorded in Texas.						
EFU	NW of Humboldt	Coles	IL	39.633°N 88.3524°W	00:36–00:37	0.11 mi (0.18 km)	25 yd (23 m)
EFU	The tornado was reported by a storm chaser and confirmed by video. It remained over open country and caused no damage.						

== May ==
Confirmed tornadoes by Enhanced Fujita rating
EFU	EF0	EF1	EF2	EF3	EF4	EF5	Total
74	124	53	8	0	0	0	259

=== May 2 event ===
List of confirmed tornadoes – Sunday, May 2, 2021
EF#	Location	County / Parish	State	Start Coord.	Time (UTC)	Path length	Max width	Summary
EF0	NW of Clinton	Greene	AL	32.955°N 88.0286°W	20:45–20:50	1.42 mi (2.29 km)	45 yd (41 m)	A brief tornado caused sporadic damage, uprooting a few softwood trees and breaking large tree limbs.
EFU	S of Talla Bena	Madison	LA	32.4726°N 91.1626°W	21:57–21:59	1.38 mi (2.22 km)	25 yd (23 m)	A brief tornado crossed US 65. No damage was observed.
EF0	N of McClave	Bent	CO	38.16°N 102.85°W	22:20–20:23	0.92 mi (1.48 km)	20 yd (18 m)	A tornado was observed. No other details are available.
EFU	S of Elrod	Tuscaloosa	AL	33.1927°N 87.7959°W	22:25–22:26	0.25 mi (0.40 km)	25 yd (23 m)	A brief, weak tornado was caught on video, no damage could be found.
EFU	W of Jena	LaSalle	LA	31.6904°N 92.2236°W	22:46–22:47	1.18 mi (1.90 km)	25 yd (23 m)	A brief tornado was caught on drone video as it lifted moisture from the ground. No damage was reported.
EF1	E of Valley Park to E of Yazoo City	Issaquena, Yazoo	MS	32.6258°N 90.7173°W	22:46–23:35	30.15 mi (48.52 km)	300 yd (270 m)	A high-end EF1 tornado destroyed two mobile homes and a billboard at the south edge of Yazoo City, with debris scattered. Two other mobile homes and other buildings were also damaged, some by fallen trees. Extensive tree damage occurred along the path, and outbuildings were destroyed.
EF1	WNW of Coxburg to NE of Howard	Holmes	MS	33.0062°N 90.2497°W	22:53–23:11	10.63 mi (17.11 km)	450 yd (410 m)	A high-end EF1 tornado removed part of the roof of a mobile home and caused heavy tree damage.
EF1	NW of Lorman to NE of Pattison	Jefferson, Claiborne	MS	31.8345°N 91.0644°W	22:55–23:18	14.03 mi (22.58 km)	650 yd (590 m)	Trees were uprooted and snapped and tree limbs were broken.
EF2	SW of Acona to ESE of Black Hawk	Holmes, Carroll	MS	33.2512°N 90.0426°W	23:31–23:40	5.95 mi (9.58 km)	510 yd (470 m)	Numerous large trees were snapped or uprooted along the path. One house had moderate roof damage and was struck by a falling tree, as well as some high-tension power lines that were brought down by trees.
EF0	NNW of Midway to NNW of Ebenezer	Yazoo, Holmes	MS	32.8981°N 90.2052°W	23:44–23:59	8.15 mi (13.12 km)	100 yd (91 m)	Damage was mainly limited to trees.
EF0	ENE of Marion	Union	LA	32.9291°N 92.1492°W	23:52–23:53	0.11 mi (0.18 km)	80 yd (73 m)	A brief tornado uprooted approximately 40 trees in a convergent pattern east of Marion.
EF1	W of Durant	Holmes	MS	33.0708°N 89.9014°W	00:20–00:27	4.15 mi (6.68 km)	300 yd (270 m)	An old building had roof damage and a utility pole was knocked down. Many trees were snapped, uprooted, or had broken limbs. Two trees fell on a home and a parked school bus.
EF1	SSE of Pine Grove to Byram	Hinds	MS	32.1172°N 90.3617°W	00:22–00:35	6.88 mi (11.07 km)	1,000 yd (910 m)	Several homes sustained roof damage, some from fallen trees, and a barn was damaged. Some basketball hoops were toppled Many large trees were snapped and uprooted, and some basketball goals were blown down.
EF1	SE of Pickens	Madison	MS	32.8268°N 89.9414°W	00:41–00:47	3.37 mi (5.42 km)	250 yd (230 m)	Tree limbs and treetops were broken. A few trees were uprooted and snapped.
EF1	NE of Possumneck to N of Hesterville	Attala	MS	33.1676°N 89.7316°W	00:42–00:51	7.46 mi (12.01 km)	110 yd (100 m)	One home sustained roof damage. Multiple trees were uprooted or snapped and a power line was downed.
EF0	Southern Aurora	Hamilton	NE	40.8401°N 97.9914°W	00:51–00:56	0.92 mi (1.48 km)	150 yd (140 m)	A landspout blew in the garage doors of a storage unit at the south edge of Aurora, downed a power line, and lofted corn.
EFU	S of Aurora	Hamilton	NE	40.8403°N 98.0049°W	00:51–00:52	0.01 mi (0.016 km)	40 yd (37 m)	A landspout tornado was confirmed from photographs. No damage was reported.
EF0	ESE of Axtell	Kearney	NE	40.474°N 99.0502°W	00:57–01:01	1.72 mi (2.77 km)	150 yd (140 m)	A landspout tornado was caught on video. Damage was minimal.
EF0	SW of Stromsburg	Polk	NE	41.0707°N 97.6259°W	01:06–01:10	1.33 mi (2.14 km)	100 yd (91 m)	A landspout caused minor damage to a home, blew out the doors of a metal building, overturned a horse trailer, and caused minor tree damage.
EF0	Sabougla	Calhoun	MS	33.762°N 89.471°W	01:08–01:11	1.29 mi (2.08 km)	50 yd (46 m)	Trees were knocked down.
EF0	SE of Sallis	Leake	MS	32.8777°N 89.7076°W	01:17–01:23	2.94 mi (4.73 km)	50 yd (46 m)	Trees were snapped and uprooted along the path.
EF0	N of French Camp	Choctaw	MS	33.4181°N 89.424°W	01:23–01:27	2.07 mi (3.33 km)	60 yd (55 m)	A brief tornado blew down trees.
EF1	Calhoun City	Calhoun	MS	33.8350°N 89.3249°W	01:30–01:33	2.07 mi (3.33 km)	50 yd (46 m)	An old masonry structure was completely destroyed. Homes, apartments, and other buildings throughout town sustained considerable damage from wind and falling trees.
EF0	N of New Houlka to NW of Troy	Chickasaw, Pontotoc	MS	34.065°N 89.024°W	02:15–02:29	7.45 mi (11.99 km)	50 yd (46 m)	Numerous trees were damaged.
EF1	E of Algoma to SW of Tupelo	Pontotoc, Lee	MS	34.1795°N 88.8421°W	02:40–02:50	4.5 mi (7.2 km)	150 yd (140 m)	Numerous trees and the roofs of several residences were damaged.
EF1	Tupelo to NNW of Eggville	Lee	MS	34.2333°N 88.7520°W	02:53–03:19	12.66 mi (20.37 km)	400 yd (370 m)	Two residences in Tupelo lost parts of their roofs and several houses suffered substantial damage from fallen trees. Commercial buildings were damaged and a church suffered minor roof damage. Numerous trees were uprooted and some were snapped. This tornado, as well as the preceding one, prompted a tornado emergency for Tupelo.
EF0	E of Saltillo to NNW of Mantachie	Lee, Itawamba	MS	34.3670°N 88.5602°W	03:22–03:27	1.99 mi (3.20 km)	100 yd (91 m)	Trees were damaged by this weak tornado.

=== May 3 event ===
List of confirmed tornadoes – Monday, May 3, 2021
EF#	Location	County / Parish	State	Start Coord.	Time (UTC)	Path length	Max width	Summary
EF1	Tompkinsville	Monroe	KY	36.7022°N 85.6957°W	13:08–13:09	0.5 mi (0.80 km)	60 yd (55 m)	Trees were snapped and uprooted, power lines were downed, buildings in Tompkinsville sustained roof and window damage, and an RV was flipped.
EF1	E of Bill Arp to NNE of Fouts Mill	Douglas	GA	33.6681°N 84.7821°W	14:00–14:03	1.45 mi (2.33 km)	250 yd (230 m)	Trees were snapped and uprooted, falling on at least 10 homes.
EF1	NE of Campbellton to WSW of Adamsville	Fulton	GA	33.6974°N 84.6206°W	14:22–14:34	5.73 mi (9.22 km)	400 yd (370 m)	This high-end EF1 tornado first significantly damaged multiple warehouses, before moving into a residential area, where numerous trees were snapped and uprooted. Houses in this area sustained roof and siding damage as well.
EF1	NNE of Smyrna	York	SC	35.077°N 81.386°W	16:39–16:40	0.5 mi (0.80 km)	150 yd (140 m)	The tornado touched down in a field before moving through a farm, destroying one building, damaging several others and killing 4,000 turkeys. Trees were damaged farther along the path.
EF0	S of Gratis	Walton	GA	33.8501°N 83.6841°W	16:39–16:42	1.4 mi (2.3 km)	200 yd (180 m)	A brief tornado snapped trees and caused minor damage to a fence and a home.
EF0	NNW of Manchester	Coffee	TN	35.5524°N 86.1322°W	16:42–16:44	0.83 mi (1.34 km)	50 yd (46 m)	Two homes sustained minor damage, and numerous trees were blown down. The path was visible in a corn field.
EF1	SSE of Neese to S of Danielsville	Madison	GA	34.0672°N 83.315°W	16:54–17:05	5.53 mi (8.90 km)	250 yd (230 m)	Numerous trees were snapped or uprooted along the path, some of them falling on and damaging houses. Outbuildings were destroyed as well.
EF0	S of Winterville to ESE of Dunlap	Oglethorpe	GA	33.9543°N 83.2791°W	17:29–17:32	1.87 mi (3.01 km)	200 yd (180 m)	Trees were uprooted and snapped and a barn lost its roof.
EF1	NW of Elberton	Elbert	GA	34.128°N 82.895°W	17:41–17:42	0.13 mi (0.21 km)	25 yd (23 m)	A very brief tornado collapsed the roof supports of a warehouse. Trees were snapped or uprooted.
EF2	SW of Lowndesville to NW Greenwood	Abbeville, Greenwood	SC	34.174°N 82.696°W	18:04-18:54	29.35 mi (47.23 km)	150 yd (140 m)	This tornado touched down southwest of Lowndesville and quickly intensified. In this area, a man was injured when he was blown off his porch and several outbuildings were destroyed. The tornado weakened as it passed south of Lowndesville, and sporadically uprooted trees for the next few miles. The tornado then quickly intensified again as it inflicted severe roof and exterior damage to a home. The tornado weakened as it moved east, snapping and uprooting numerous trees near Abbeville. It became strong again for a final time farther along the path as hundreds of hardwood trees were snapped in a localized area. The tornado weakened again, and lifted as it entered densely populated neighborhoods in Greenwood, where minor tree limb damage occurred. The tornado was on the ground for 51 minutes and prompted several PDS tornado warnings.
EF0	S of St. Martin	Stanly	NC	35.2441°N 80.2856°W	18:23-18:25	1.48 mi (2.38 km)	150 yd (140 m)	A brief tornado destroyed a chicken house and snapped and uprooted several trees.
EF2	NNW of Luttrellville to WNW of Lake	Northumberland	VA	37.956°N 76.575°W	19:01–19:03	4.41 mi (7.10 km)	250 yd (230 m)	A manufactured home built to withstand 100 mph (160 km/h) winds was swept away and completely destroyed. A nearby home lost its garage, with the home itself being severely damaged. Additional homes and outbuildings were damaged, and many trees were snapped or uprooted.
EFU	ENE of Arenzville	Cass	IL	39.8849°N 90.3244°W	21:57–21:59	0.5 mi (0.80 km)	50 yd (46 m)	A weak tornado touched down in an open field, producing no damage.
EFU	S of Virginia	Cass	IL	39.9074°N 90.2119°W	22:05–22:08	1.48 mi (2.38 km)	100 yd (91 m)	The tornado touched down in an open field, producing no damage.
EFU	WNW of Pleasant Plains	Sangamon	IL	39.8799°N 89.9497°W	22:27–22:28	0.29 mi (0.47 km)	50 yd (46 m)	The tornado touched down in an open field, producing no damage.
EF1	Ranson	Jefferson	WV	39.3108°N 77.8655°W	22:27–22:32	1.81 mi (2.91 km)	125 yd (114 m)	One outdoor shed was blown off its foundation, while another shed was shifted from its foundation. A tractor-trailer was blown over on SR 115. After crossing the highway, the tornado pushed over a large warehouse building that was partially open, injuring one person. Sections of the tin roof of the warehouse were carried as far as 1/2 mi (0.80 km) away. Another small warehouse building was also destroyed. Shingle and siding damage occurred to homes in Ranson, and trees were snapped or uprooted along the path. A mobile home was damaged before the tornado lifted.
EF0	E of Granbury	Hood	TX	32.4403°N 97.7406°W	23:02–23:04	0.36 mi (0.58 km)	50 yd (46 m)	A carport and trees were damaged.
EFU	ESE of Dawson	Sangamon	IL	39.8478°N 89.4508°W	23:10–23:11	0.43 mi (0.69 km)	50 yd (46 m)	The tornado touched down in an open field, producing no damage.
EFU	WNW of Mechanicsburg	Sangamon	IL	39.8267°N 89.4282°W	23:14–23:15	0.63 mi (1.01 km)	50 yd (46 m)	The tornado touched down in an open field, producing no damage.
EFU	W of Blum	Hill	TX	32.1367°N 97.4546°W	00:10	0.01 mi (0.016 km)	25 yd (23 m)	A brief tornado touched down before the larger EF2 tornado.
EF0	SW of Libertytown	Frederick	MD	39.4520°N 77.2922°W	00:14–00:16	0.78 mi (1.26 km)	200 yd (180 m)	150 trees were uprooted, snapped or damaged.
EF2	NW of Blum	Hill	TX	32.1426°N 97.4449°W	00:18–00:29	3.36 mi (5.41 km)	150 yd (140 m)	A brick house lost most of its roof and portions of its exterior walls as a result of this high-end EF2 tornado. Trees and outbuildings were also damaged.
EF0	Unionville	Frederick	MD	39.482°N 77.153°W	00:35–00:36	0.64 mi (1.03 km)	150 yd (140 m)	Large sheds, equipment, and trees were damaged at a farm.
EF0	S of Weston	Collin	TX	33.3276°N 96.6676°W	00:41–00:43	0.51 mi (0.82 km)	50 yd (46 m)	Power lines were downed by this weak, brief tornado.
EF0	SE of New Windsor	Carroll	MD	39.511°N 77.084°W	00:47–00:48	0.21 mi (0.34 km)	75 yd (69 m)	A calf shed was unroofed and destroyed, killing the calf inside. Another shed was unroofed and destroyed. 10 trees were downed, one of which fell onto an old barn.
EF0	ENE of Grandview	Johnson	TX	32.2771°N 97.1279°W	01:00-01:01	0.24 mi (0.39 km)	50 yd (46 m)	Power lines, a utility pole, and trees were damaged.
EF0	NW of Portersville	Lawrence	PA	40.976°N 80.210°W	01:37	0.16 mi (0.26 km)	50 yd (46 m)	A very brief, weak tornado caused damage to tree limbs.
EF2	Five Points to S of Waxahachie	Ellis	TX	32.28°N 96.91°W	01:43–01:57	5.43 mi (8.74 km)	659 yd (603 m)	In the Five Points area, this tornado caused major roof damage to a home, lesser damage to several other homes, destroyed outbuildings, overturned a mobile home, and snapped many trees. Three semi-trucks and a cargo van were blown over on I-35E south of Nena, injuring three people. After crossing the interstate, the tornado ripped the roof off of a two-story home, overturned a pickup truck, damaged or destroyed some mobile homes, collapsed metal electrical transmission truss towers and a microwave tower, damaged two metal buildings, and injured five additional people in this area. The tornado dissipated shortly after. Overall, the tornado injured eight people.
EF1	NW of Paw Paw, OK to ENE of Graphic, AR	Sequoyah (OK), Sebastian (AR), Crawford (AR)	OK, AR	35.363°N 94.547°W	02:33–03:05	28.8 mi (46.3 km)	2,200 yd (2,000 m)	In Oklahoma, trees were uprooted southeast of Muldrow where this large very tornado first developed. As the tornado moved northeast, it flipped multiple center-pivot irritation systems and snapped power poles near Moffett. The tornado then crossed the Arkansas River into Arkansas and moved into the northern side of Fort Smith in Sebastian County, where it damaged many homes and businesses. The tornado crossed the Arkansas River once again into Crawford County and into Van Buren where the Crawford County courthouse had most of its roof removed. Many homes and businesses were also damaged in Van Buren. The tornado continued to the northeast of Van Buren, hitting portions of Rudy and Alma. Outbuildings were destroyed, more homes and businesses were damaged, power poles were snapped, and trees were snapped or uprooted. The tornado crossed I-49 before lifting southeast of Mountainburg. Damaging straight-line winds in excess of 80–100 mph (130–160 km/h) surrounded this tornado as it tracked across Sebastian and Crawford counties. Some areas damaged by the tornado sustained additional damage from straight-line winds that followed behind the tornado.
EF1	E of Muldrow, OK to NE of Dora, AR	Sequoyah (OK), Crawford (AR)	OK, AR	35.409°N 94.578°W	02:36–02:47	10.3 mi (16.6 km)	900 yd (820 m)	This large tornado tracked just north of the previous one. In Oklahoma, trees were snapped and uprooted east of Muldrow where this tornado first touched down. The tornado moved east-northeast to the north of Roland where it snapped trees and power poles, destroyed outbuildings, and damaged several homes. Shortly after, the tornado moved into Arkansas north of I-40 and dissipated to the northeast of Dora, after snapping and uprooting more trees. Widespread tree damage continued beyond the path of this tornado, caused by straight-line wind.
EF1	N of Dyer	Crawford	AR	35.555°N 94.153°W	03:06–03:10	2.7 mi (4.3 km)	300 yd (270 m)	This tornado developed just after the first large EF1 Fort Smith area tornado dissipated to the northeast. Power poles were blown down, and trees were uprooted along the path.

=== May 4 event ===
List of confirmed tornadoes – Tuesday, May 4, 2021
EF#	Location	County / Parish	State	Start Coord.	Time (UTC)	Path length	Max width	Summary
EF0	Oak Grove Heights	Greene	AR	36.1466°N 90.5353°W	07:09–07:12	2.24 mi (3.60 km)	100 yd (91 m)	A shed and storage building were damaged and a mobile home was pushed off it piers. Numerous trees were uprooted and a few were snapped.
EF0	N of Concord	Pemiscot	MO	36.3001°N 89.7007°W	07:55–07:58	2.73 mi (4.39 km)	90 yd (82 m)	Residences, two grain bins, and a shop were damaged, with debris carried about 0.25 mi (0.40 km). Trees were uprooted wit one falling on a church.
EF1	N of Dorena	Mississippi	MO	36.623°N 89.262°W	08:19–08:25	3.71 mi (5.97 km)	400 yd (370 m)	An equipment shed was destroyed, a pivot sprinkler system was damaged, and trees were uprooted and snapped.
EF1	WSW of Union City	Obion	TN	36.4123°N 89.1602°W	08:23–08:26	2.6 mi (4.2 km)	50 yd (46 m)	A 500-foot (150 m) tower and antennae were damaged numerous trees were downed, with some falling on houses.
EF1	W of Clinton	Hickman	KY	36.661°N 89.089°W	08:31–08:38	5.25 mi (8.45 km)	100 yd (91 m)	Trees were snapped or uprooted. Tree branches and trees fell onto homes, causing damage. There was damage to 28 residential structures and 12 commercial structures.
EF2	WNW of Fulton	Fulton	KY	36.52°N 89.031°W	08:33–08:41	6.06 mi (9.75 km)	150 yd (140 m)	Several large trees were snapped and uprooted by this tornado. A house had most of its roof removed and sustained significant damage to its exterior. Three outbuildings were destroyed in this area, and a car was moved 20 feet (6.1 m).
EF1	SW of Cuba to Lynnville	Graves	KY	36.5544°N 88.6519°W	08:55–09:00	4.67 mi (7.52 km)	125 yd (114 m)	Several farm buildings lost their roofs, two homes had minor roof and siding damage, and smaller structures were destroyed. Many trees were snapped or uprooted.
EF1	ENE of Mayfield	Graves	KY	36.758°N 88.578°W	08:59–09:00	0.54 mi (0.87 km)	100 yd (91 m)	A well-constructed home sustained roof damage. Large trees were uprooted along a creek bed.
EF0	WSW of Lick Creek	Benton	TN	36.317°N 88.042°W	09:35–09:39	3.14 mi (5.05 km)	80 yd (73 m)	A few outbuildings were damaged and trees were uprooted. Some trees fell on and damaged homes and vehicles.
EF0	SE of Hopkinsville	Christian	KY	36.819°N 87.468°W	10:12–10:15	2.62 mi (4.22 km)	75 yd (69 m)	Four barns lost portions of their tin roofs and siding. Trees were uprooted or damaged.
EF0	N of Joelton	Cheatham, Davidson	TN	36.3537°N 86.92°W	10:54–11:00	4.91 mi (7.90 km)	100 yd (91 m)	Trees were uprooted, and large branches were snapped off.
EF0	WNW of Cross Plains	Robertson	TN	36.5621°N 86.8271°W	10:56–10:58	1.76 mi (2.83 km)	25 yd (23 m)	A small tornado heavily damaged an outbuilding, blew much of the roof off a large barn, destroyed a carport, and blew down trees.
EF0	NE of Greenbrier	Robertson	TN	36.4675°N 86.7798°W	11:01–11:04	2.21 mi (3.56 km)	200 yd (180 m)	A house lost shingles and a board pieced its roof. A shed lost was destroyed a carport was torn from an RV. Trees were blown down.
EF0	NW of Cross Plains to W of Portland	Robertson, Sumner	TN	36.5723°N 86.7618°W	11:02–11:14	9.41 mi (15.14 km)	50 yd (46 m)	Two outbuildings were destroyed and a shed was blown into a road and destroyed. A barn was damaged. Numerous trees were uprooted and snapped and one tree fell on a home.
EF0	NW of Goodlettsville to SE of Millersville	Davidson, Sumner	TN	36.348°N 86.7939°W	11:03–11:12	6.38 mi (10.27 km)	200 yd (180 m)	Dozens of trees and power lines were blown down.
EF0	White House	Robertson, Sumner	TN	36.4684°N 86.6593°W	11:10–11:12	0.71 mi (1.14 km)	25 yd (23 m)	A brief, weak tornado blew the metal roofs of a building and a nearby business in White House. Several homes suffered minor roof damage. Trees were knocked down.
EF0	Gallatin	Sumner	TN	36.3542°N 86.5601°W	11:21–11:25	3.89 mi (6.26 km)	50 yd (46 m)	Two large barns were destroyed and some trees, signs, and power poles were blown down in Gallatin.
EF0	SE of Gallatin to SSE of Castalian Springs	Sumner	TN	36.3567°N 86.4174°W	11:31–11:39	6.87 mi (11.06 km)	50 yd (46 m)	Numerous trees were blown down.
EF0	N of Castalian Springs to W of Hartsville	Sumner, Trousdale	TN	36.4226°N 86.3137°W	11:38–11:44	5.05 mi (8.13 km)	200 yd (180 m)	Several homes were damaged and a barn was heavily damaged. Numerous trees were blown down.
EF0	E of Hartsville	Trousdale	TN	36.3945°N 86.1153°W	11:54–11:58	3.27 mi (5.26 km)	50 yd (46 m)	A business was damaged and trees were blown down.
EF0	Lafayette	Macon	TN	36.5314°N 86.0504°W	11:56–11:58	1.93 mi (3.11 km)	25 yd (23 m)	A convenience store in town partially lost its roof, and trees were blown down.
EF0	S of Alexandria	DeKalb	TN	36.0571°N 86.0347°W	12:20–12:21	1.04 mi (1.67 km)	25 yd (23 m)	Tree and structural damage occurred along U.S. 70. The roof and back porch were blown off of a house.
EF0	NE of Smithville	DeKalb	TN	36.0021°N 85.8028°W	12:43–12:49	4.81 mi (7.74 km)	200 yd (180 m)	Several homes and barns were damaged, and trees were blown down.
EF0	Sparta	White	TN	35.9738°N 85.4938°W	13:07–13:09	1.11 mi (1.79 km)	50 yd (46 m)	A barn was heavily damaged and trees were blown down.
EF1	WNW of Braxton to W of Puckett	Rankin	MS	32.0521°N 90.0492°W	14:01–14:31	9.7 mi (15.6 km)	75 yd (69 m)	This tornado crossed US 49 and struck the Piney Woods School, producing minor damage toi the structure. One home sustained shingle damage, and a shed outbuilding was damaged. Trees were snapped or uprooted.
EF0	Higdon	Jackson	AL	34.8445°N 85.6401°W	14:44–14:45	0.55 mi (0.89 km)	50 yd (46 m)	A house in Higdon suffered minor roof damage and a carport was destroyed by this brief tornado. A few trees were also uprooted.
EF0	SE of Dahlonega	Lumpkin	GA	34.4797°N 83.9624°W	17:21–17:32	4.7 mi (7.6 km)	350 yd (320 m)	This tornado snapped and uprooted several trees in southeastern Lumpkin County. Additionally, a few houses and sheds had minor roof and/or siding damage.
EF0	WSW of Alto to NNE of Archibald	Richland	LA	32.3547°N 91.917°W	18:13–18:21	8.55 mi (13.76 km)	700 yd (640 m)	Tree limbs were snapped, trees were uprooted, and a few small trees were snapped. One tree fall on a mobile home, and some structures sustained roof damage from falling trees and limbs.
EF1	NW of Force	Elk	PA	41.3053°N 78.5175°W	18:51–18:52	0.60 mi (0.97 km)	125 yd (114 m)	Trees were damaged along the path. A tornado debris signature was also observed on radar.
EF1	WSW of Mound, LA to SE of Vicksburg, MS	Madison (LA), Warren (MS)	LA, MS	32.3222°N 91.115°W	18:59–19:17	17.73 mi (28.53 km)	600 yd (550 m)	Buildings and vehicles were damaged, mainly from falling trees. Two utility poles were snapped, and many trees were uprooted and snapped or had broken limbs.
EF0	NE of Bentonia	Yazoo	MS	32.728°N 90.3697°W	19:22–19:32	9.21 mi (14.82 km)	250 yd (230 m)	Large tree limbs were snapped and several trees were uprooted. A few large hardwood trees were uprooted, and several trees were snapped in the most intense area of damage.
EF1	NNW of Bolton to NNW of Brandon	Hinds, Madison, Rankin	MS	32.4641°N 90.5194°W	19:24–19:55	30.70 mi (49.41 km)	880 yd (800 m)	This tornado first touched down northwest of the community of Brownsville where it started snapping and uprooting trees as it moved southeast. A shed was destroyed also destroyed by falling tree limbs, and a power pole was snapped near US 49. The tornado damaged homes and outbuildings as it entered the northwestern side of Jackson. Minor damage to structures and trees continued along the path as the tornado moved through a densely populated area. The tornado lifted shortly before crossing SR 471.
EF1	W of Lena to NW of Sebastopol	Leake	MS	32.5982°N 89.6168°W	20:06–20:20	14.97 mi (24.09 km)	1,050 yd (960 m)	Several trees were snapped and uprooted. A gas station canopy near Walnut Grove was damaged and a pieces of sheet metal was peeled from a barn.
EF1	S of Winnsboro Mills	Fairfield	SC	34.3035°N 81.1407°W	20:23–20:29	3.9 mi (6.3 km)	300 yd (270 m)	Numerous trees were uprooted and snapped, and several homes sustained roof and siding damage. At the Fairfield County Airport, a hangar had two of its external walls pushed out and five small aircraft were damaged, one of which was destroyed after being removed from its tie-down ropes and thrown 100 yards into a field.
EF1	SW of Duffee to W of Collinsville	Newton, Lauderdale	MS	32.4586°N 88.9638°W	20:43–20:48	5.54 mi (8.92 km)	400 yd (370 m)	Several trees were snapped and uprooted. Three outbuildings sustained roof damage.
EF1	Toomsuba	Lauderdale	MS	32.4099°N 88.5223°W	21:08–21:12	3.47 mi (5.58 km)	450 yd (410 m)	This tornado touched down near the Toomsuba exit of I-20/59 and moved through Toomsuba, where several trees were snapped or uprooted. A barn sustained roof damage northeast of town, and a few homes had siding damage.
EF0	N of Sprott to N of Pletcher	Perry, Chilton	AL	32.7381°N 87.2159°W	22:19–22:44	24.84 mi (39.98 km)	620 yd (570 m)	Trees were snapped or uprooted.
EF1	Prattville to northern Montgomery	Autauga, Elmore, Montgomery	AL	32.4707°N 86.4421°W	23:17–23:28	10.63 mi (17.11 km)	330 yd (300 m)	Many homes, a Bass Pro Shop west of I-65, and several hotels east of the interstate in Prattville sustained roof damage. A Chevron gas station had many metal panels removed from the gas pump canopy. Trees were snapped or uprooted, including some that fell onto homes damaging them.
EF0	S of Shorter	Macon	AL	32.3667°N 85.9491°W	23:46–23:49	2.17 mi (3.49 km)	50 yd (46 m)	A brief tornado uprooted softwood trees. Much of the path was inaccessible.

=== May 5 event ===
List of confirmed tornadoes – Wednesday, May 5, 2021
EF#	Location	County / Parish	State	Start Coord.	Time (UTC)	Path length	Max width
EFU	S of Meadow Grove	Madison	NE	41.90°N 97.74°W	20:10	0.05 mi (0.080 km)	25 yd (23 m)
EFU	A brief tornado touched down in a field. No damage was reported.						
EFU	SSE of Clay Center	Clay	NE	40.47°N 98.02°W	20:30	0.01 mi (0.016 km)	40 yd (37 m)
EFU	A landspout tornado touched down in an open field, causing no damage.						
EF0	Hartington	Cedar	NE	42.63°N 97.28°W	21:42	0.95 mi (1.53 km)	50 yd (46 m)
EF0	Shingles were peeled off roofs and tree limbs were broken in town.						

=== May 6 event ===
List of confirmed tornadoes – Thursday, May 6, 2021
EF#	Location	County / Parish	State	Start Coord.	Time (UTC)	Path length	Max width
EF0	N of Dunkel	Christian	IL	39.4865°N 89.0643°W	19:11–19:12	0.18 mi (0.29 km)	20 yd (18 m)
EF0	Tornado mainly caused tree damage. A house sustained some damage to its siding, and a hole was punched into a roof by a falling tree limb.						
EFU	S of Altamont	Effingham	IL	39.0294°N 88.7493°W	20:10–20:11	0.06 mi (0.097 km)	10 yd (9.1 m)
EFU	A brief touchdown caused no damage.						
EFU	NNW of Edgewood	Effingham	IL	38.9375°N 88.6597°W	20:30–20:31	0.06 mi (0.097 km)	10 yd (9.1 m)
EFU	A brief tornado touched down in a field and caused no damage.						
EF0	E of Rinard	Wayne	IL	38.57°N 88.433°W	22:00–22:01	0.52 mi (0.84 km)	30 yd (27 m)
EF0	Emergency managers reported a brief tornado that caused no damage.						
EFU	S of Noble	Richland	IL	38.6613°N 88.2225°W	22:01–22:02	0.12 mi (0.19 km)	10 yd (9.1 m)
EFU	A brief tornado touched down in a field, causing no damage.						

=== May 7 event ===
List of confirmed tornadoes – Friday, May 7, 2021
EF#	Location	County / Parish	State	Start Coord.	Time (UTC)	Path length	Max width
EF0	NNE of Kings Mill to W of Pampa	Gray	TX	35.5241°N 101.0842°W	23:40–23:46	3.28 mi (5.28 km)	25 yd (23 m)
EF0	A landspout stayed in mostly open country and crossed two power lines without damaging them, indicating a weak tornado.						

=== May 9 event ===
List of confirmed tornadoes – Sunday, May 9, 2021
EF#	Location	County / Parish	State	Start Coord.	Time (UTC)	Path length	Max width
EF0	S of Wood Spur	St. Francis	AR	34.941°N 90.972°W	21:30–21:32	0.62 mi (1.00 km)	60 yd (55 m)
EF0	A brief tornado damaged a barn and storage building, removed metal from the roof of a house, and uprooted trees.						
EF1	NE of Drummonds to N of Munford	Tipton	TN	35.4730°N 89.8984°W	22:08–22:19	4.8 mi (7.7 km)	300 yd (270 m)
EF1	Several homes, a barn, a storage building and a shed were damaged. Trees were snapped or uprooted, some of which fell onto homes.						
EF0	S of Rudderville	Williamson	TN	35.8393°N 86.7594°W	00:38–00:39	0.78 mi (1.26 km)	25 yd (23 m)
EF0	A weak tornado moved just south of Page High School, knocking down a few trees and tree branches.						

=== May 10 event ===
List of confirmed tornadoes – Monday, May 10, 2021
EF#	Location	County / Parish	State	Start Coord.	Time (UTC)	Path length	Max width
EF1	N of Sutphin	Alamance	NC	35.90°N 79.35°W	20:46–20:48	1.23 mi (1.98 km)	200 yd (180 m)
EF1	A brief tornado uprooted or snapped several trees and damaged a few homes and outbuildings.						
EF0	Huntsville	Walker	TX	30.7166°N 95.5727°W	23:24–23:25	0.57 mi (0.92 km)	50 yd (46 m)
EF0	A brief tornado caused minor damage to fencing and knocked down two trees.						

=== May 11 event ===
List of confirmed tornadoes – Tuesday, May 11, 2021
EF#	Location	County / Parish	State	Start Coord.	Time (UTC)	Path length	Max width
EF0	SW of Weldon	Houston	TX	30.98°N 95.63°W	19:10–19:11	0.01 mi (0.016 km)	20 yd (18 m)
EF0	A brief tornado touched down, evidenced by swirling dirt beneath a funnel cloud, and caused no damage.						
EF1	SE of Cleveland	Liberty	TX	30.2007°N 95.0069°W	23:14–23:15	0.25 mi (0.40 km)	100 yd (91 m)
EF1	Large trees were uprooted. Some fell on and damaged homes.						

=== May 12 event ===
List of confirmed tornadoes – Wednesday, May 12, 2021
EF#	Location	County / Parish	State	Start Coord.	Time (UTC)	Path length	Max width
EF0	New Orleans	Orleans	LA	29.9492°N 90.119°W	07:05–07:12	5.14 mi (8.27 km)	125 yd (114 m)
EF0	The tornado first touched down in the Uptown area of New Orleans, producing mainly tree and limb damage. As the tornado continued east, it peeled back the tin roof of a large metal building near the New Orleans Union Passenger Terminal. The tornado then turned southeast into the Central Business District near the Louisiana Superdome, where it knocked down more trees and tree limbs. The tornado crossed the Mississippi River into the Algiers neighborhood, where it knocked down trees and power poles, and also damaged the roofs of several homes and businesses. The tornado lifted near the Naval Support Activity Center.						

=== May 13 event ===
List of confirmed tornadoes – Thursday, May 13, 2021
EF#	Location	County / Parish	State	Start Coord.	Time (UTC)	Path length	Max width
EFU	NW of Goodland	Sherman	KS	39.42°N 101.76°W	01:10	0.05 mi (0.080 km)	25 yd (23 m)
EFU	A brief landspout was observed.						

=== May 14 event ===
List of confirmed tornadoes – Friday, May 14, 2021
EF#	Location	County / Parish	State	Start Coord.	Time (UTC)	Path length	Max width
EF0	E of Canby	Yellow Medicine	MN	44.7089°N 96.2051°W	00:52–00:53	0.28 mi (0.45 km)	25 yd (23 m)
EF0	A landspout knocked down large tree limbs and moved over a tractor as it was being driven, leaving it upright.						

=== May 15 event ===
List of confirmed tornadoes – Saturday, May 15, 2021
EF#	Location	County / Parish	State	Start Coord.	Time (UTC)	Path length	Max width
EFU	S of Wakonda	Clay	SD	42.966°N 97.121°W	17:54–17:59	1.29 mi (2.08 km)	25 yd (23 m)
EFU	An intermittent landspout tornado touched down sporadically for 5 minutes and kicked up dust in open fields.						
EFU	ENE of Manson	Calhoun	IA	42.5548°N 94.4549°W	21:35–21:36	0.33 mi (0.53 km)	30 yd (27 m)
EFU	A brief landspout was captured on video and did not cause any damage.						
EF0	N of Saragota	Howard	IA	43.3922°N 92.4154°W	22:49–22:51	0.3 mi (0.48 km)	15 yd (14 m)
EF0	A brief landspout touched down in an open field. No damage was reported.						
EFU	S of Rocky Ford to W of Swink	Otero	CO	38.02°N 103.72°W	00:19–00:24	2.43 mi (3.91 km)	20 yd (18 m)
EFU	A brief tornado was reported by the public.						

=== May 16 event ===
List of confirmed tornadoes – Sunday, May 16, 2021
EF#	Location	County / Parish	State	Start Coord.	Time (UTC)	Path length	Max width
EF0	NW of Pendleton	Bell	TX	31.2132°N 97.3801°W	16:14–16:16	1.95 mi (3.14 km)	50 yd (46 m)
EF0	A tornado was observed on the ground briefly. Several homes sustained minor damage, and some chicken coops and outbuildings were destroyed.						
EFU	SW of Maypearl	Hill, Ellis	TX	32.2576°N 97.085°W	18:42–18:50	2.33 mi (3.75 km)	50 yd (46 m)
EFU	A tornado was caught on video by a storm spotter. Small branches and leaves were lofted by the tornado.						
EF0	University Park	Dallas	TX	32.8448°N 96.7982°W	19:00–19:03	0.27 mi (0.43 km)	30 yd (27 m)
EF0	Shingles were damage, a large tree was uprooted, and tree branches were downed.						
EFU	E of Maypearl	Ellis	TX	32.3057°N 96.9809°W	19:08–19:10	0.89 mi (1.43 km)	50 yd (46 m)
EFU	A tornado was caught on video. No damage was found.						
EF1	NNE of University Park to SW of Buckingham	Dallas	TX	32.8972°N 96.778°W	19:10–19:15	0.6 mi (0.97 km)	90 yd (82 m)
EF1	One home suffered a partial roof collapse, while other homes sustained minor to moderate roof damage. A few small trees were uprooted, and tree branches were downed.						
EFU	W of Waxahachie	Ellis	TX	32.4003°N 96.9627°W	20:14–20:16	0.64 mi (1.03 km)	50 yd (46 m)
EFU	A tornado was caught on video east of the Shadow Creek Pumpkin farm. No damage was found.						
EFU	NNW of Ordway	Crowley	CO	38.48°N 103.87°W	22:15–22:19	3.47 mi (5.58 km)	20 yd (18 m)
EFU	Tornado was observed on the ground for 4 minutes. No damage was reported.						
EFU	ENE of Sudan	Lamb	TX	34.1122°N 102.4394°W	00:40–00:43	0.97 mi (1.56 km)	50 yd (46 m)
EFU	A brief tornado was photographed in an open field. No damage was reported.						
EF0	N of Stamford	Haskell	TX	32.9656°N 99.8055°W	03:46–03:47	0.15 mi (0.24 km)	130 yd (120 m)
EF0	A metal building was thrown 75 yards (69 m), one building suffered roof damage, and debris penetrated another metal building. Tree branches were also broken.						

=== May 17 event ===
List of confirmed tornadoes – Monday May 17, 2021
EF#	Location	County / Parish	State	Start Coord.	Time (UTC)	Path length	Max width
EF0	SSW of Scholle	Socorro	NM	34.33°N 106.48°W	17:43–17:53	0.67 mi (1.08 km)	50 yd (46 m)
EF0	A landspout did not produce any reported damage.						
EF0	NNW of Arnaudville	St. Landry	LA	30.43°N 91.94°W	17:48–17:49	0.24 mi (0.39 km)	10 yd (9.1 m)
EF0	A thin, brief tornado was caught on video. No damage was reported.						
EF0	S of Point Barre	St. Landry	LA	30.53°N 91.95°W	18:13–18:14	0.13 mi (0.21 km)	10 yd (9.1 m)
EF0	A thin tornado was photographed. No damage was reported.						
EF0	SW of Lacassine	Jefferson Davis	LA	30.20°N 92.96°W	18:14–18:15	0.01 mi (0.016 km)	10 yd (9.1 m)
EF0	A thin, brief tornado was photographed. No damage was reported.						
EF0	S of Lake Charles	Calcasieu	LA	30.1157°N 93.1997°W	18:17–18:19	1.11 mi (1.79 km)	10 yd (9.1 m)
EF0	A home sustained roof damage.						
EF0	S of Valencia	Valencia	NM	34.78°N 106.7°W	18:45–18:46	0.03 mi (0.048 km)	50 yd (46 m)
EF0	A brief landspout was caught on video. No damage was reported.						
EF0	N of Domingo	Sandoval	NM	35.52°N 106.32°W	19:08–19:16	1.74 mi (2.80 km)	50 yd (46 m)
EF0	A landspout was reported by the public. No damage was reported.						
EF0	Lyons Point	Acadia	LA	30.1006°N 92.3618°W	19:17–19:18	0.15 mi (0.24 km)	10 yd (9.1 m)
EF0	A thin tornado caused minor damage.						
EF0	NNW of Jennings	Jefferson Davis	LA	30.28°N 92.68°W	20:30–20:31	0.2 mi (0.32 km)	10 yd (9.1 m)
EF0	A rope tornado remained in a field and caused no damage.						
EF0	NE of Crowley	Acadia	LA	30.27°N 92.33°W	21:12–21:13	0.11 mi (0.18 km)	10 yd (9.1 m)
EF0	A brief tornado in a field produced no damage.						
EFU	SW of Rawlins	Carbon	WY	41.76°N 107.25°W	21:45–21:53	0.25 mi (0.40 km)	20 yd (18 m)
EFU	A landspout remained over open land and caused no known damage.						
EF0	N of Melrose	Curry	NM	34.52°N 103.62°W	22:23–22:25	0.31 mi (0.50 km)	50 yd (46 m)
EF0	A brief landspout produced no damage.						
EF0	SW of Nara Visa	Quay	NM	35.55°N 103.20°W	22:33–22:43	2.67 mi (4.30 km)	60 yd (55 m)
EF0	No damage was reported.						
EF0	SW of Stanton County Municipal Airport	Stanton	KS	37.70°N 101.64°W	23:34–23:36	0.4 mi (0.64 km)	50 yd (46 m)
EF0	A landspout occurred in an open field.						
EFU	WSW of Channing	Oldham	TX	35.5306°N 102.582°W	23:35–23:39	0.86 mi (1.38 km)	20 yd (18 m)
EFU	The tornado remained over open grassland. No damage was reported.						
EF2	N of Sterling City	Sterling	TX	32.05°N 101.18°W	00:11–00:47	11.4 mi (18.3 km)	1,056 yd (966 m)
EF2	A cone-shaped multiple-vortex tornado struck and damaged a gas plant. A tower was bent, a large improvised structure made of metal shipping containers was thrown 50 yards (46 m), and a dumpster was thrown 300 yards (270 m). An RV camper was destroyed, a windmill was bent over, and large wind turbine blades on the ground were moved. Outbuildings sustained minor damage and trees were uprooted and snapped as well.						
EFU	SSE of Smyer	Hockley	TX	33.5173°N 102.1432°W	00:50–00:51	0.42 mi (0.68 km)	30 yd (27 m)
EFU	A brief tornado touched down in a field. No damage was reported.						

=== May 18 event ===
List of confirmed tornadoes – Tuesday, May 18, 2021
EF#	Location	County / Parish	State	Start Coord.	Time (UTC)	Path length	Max width
EF0	W of Madisonville	St. Tammany	LA	30.3884°N 90.1932°W	07:50–07:55	1.42 mi (2.29 km)	75 yd (69 m)
EF0	The tornado likely moved onto land from Lake Pontchartrain and traversed swampland. There was sporadic tree damage. Other damage likely occurred in area inaccessible to the damage survey team.						
EF0	Kenner	Jefferson	LA	29.9750°N 90.2596°W	08:16–08:17	0.31 mi (0.50 km)	50 yd (46 m)
EF0	A severely corroded roof was torn from a large building in Kenner. Trees and power lines were downed as well.						
EF1	NNW of Quitman	Clarke	MS	32.0644°N 88.7294°W	19:16–19:20	1.43 mi (2.30 km)	150 yd (140 m)
EF1	Damage was intermittent. The metal roofs of two apartment buildings were removed and homes sand campers sustained minor roof damage. Trees were snapped and uprooted.						
EF0	Prentiss	Jefferson Davis	MS	31.6031°N 89.8684°W	19:59–20:02	0.98 mi (1.58 km)	300 yd (270 m)
EF0	Several homes in town sustained shingle damage, and tin was peeled off the roof of an industrial building. A couple of trees were downed, one of which landed on and damaged a home.						
EF0	SW of Mendenhall	Simpson	MS	31.8958°N 89.9642°W	20:53–20:58	1.49 mi (2.40 km)	300 yd (270 m)
EF0	Trees and tree limbs were downed. A tornado debris signature appeared on radar in association with this tornado.						
EF1	NW of Sublime	Lavaca	TX	29.4936°N 96.8138°W	21:54–21:58	1.62 mi (2.61 km)	150 yd (140 m)
EF1	A small house was severely damaged, and numerous trees were snapped.						
EF0	E of Arvana	Dawson	TX	32.8057°N 101.8854°W	23:03–23:07	0.08 mi (0.13 km)	50 yd (46 m)
EF0	A funnel cloud with rotating dust beneath lasted 3–5 minutes. No damage was reported.						
EF1	Swiss Alp	Fayette	TX	29.7593°N 96.9186°W	23:42–23:52	3.27 mi (5.26 km)	400 yd (370 m)
EF1	Minor tree damage occurred as a multi-vortex tornado first touched down just west of U.S. 77. Power poles were snapped along the highway. After crossing the highway, the tornado significantly damaged a cattle farm. Metal roofing was removed from cattle shade shelters, the roof of the farm's business office was damaged, and a partial structural collapse and roof damage occurred to a covered building and a cattle working area. Significant tree damage occurred on the property. Minor and sporadic tree damage occurred as the tornado continued northeast before dissipating.						
EF0	S of Oppelo	Conway	AR	35.09°N 92.77°W	00:23	0.1 mi (0.16 km)	25 yd (23 m)
EF0	A brief tornado damaged farm outbuildings and blew down a hardwood tree.						
EF0	S of Knapp	Scurry	TX	32.5776°N 101.12°W	02:16–02:17	0.01 mi (0.016 km)	50 yd (46 m)
EF0	A dust whirl beneath a condensation funnel lasted about 30 seconds. No damage was reported.						

=== May 19 event ===
List of confirmed tornadoes – Wednesday, May 19, 2021
EF#	Location	County / Parish	State	Start Coord.	Time (UTC)	Path length	Max width
EFU	ESE of Tappen	Kidder	ND	46.852°N 99.5657°W	21:32–21:41	0.25 mi (0.40 km)	50 yd (46 m)
EFU	A landspout touched down in a field and caused no damage.						
EF0	NW of Medford	Steele, Rice	MN	44.1849°N 93.314°W	00:37–00:41	1.54 mi (2.48 km)	25 yd (23 m)
EF0	A dozen trees were broken. A Minnesota Department of Transportation traffic camera observed this tornado.						
EF0	NW of Medford	Rice	MN	44.1989°N 93.3035°W	00:39–00:40	0.3 mi (0.48 km)	15 yd (14 m)
EF0	Tree branches were broken. This tornado behaved like a satellite tornado to the large one listed above.						
EF0	SE of Warsaw	Rice	MN	44.2135°N 93.3378°W	00:42–00:47	1.83 mi (2.95 km)	50 yd (46 m)
EF0	Some large tree branches were snapped on a farmstead.						
EF0	ENE of Boutte	St. Charles	LA	29.9018°N 90.3495°W	00:42-00:43	0.52 mi (0.84 km)	75 yd (69 m)
EF0	An apartment complex had some damage to a few buildings consisting mostly of vinyl siding that was removed, a house received minor roof damage, damage to a patio cover and trees occurred and the roof panels were removed off of a shed, one of the roof panels to the shed was carried approximately 125 yards to the south where it landed on a home.						
EF0	ENE of Henderson	Le Sueur, Scott	MN	44.5394°N 93.8252°W	00:56–00:59	0.76 mi (1.22 km)	25 yd (23 m)
EF0	A brief tornado blew a trampoline and damaged a playset and a grove of trees.						
EF0	WSW of Dundas	Rice	MN	44.4055°N 93.3002°W	01:13–01:14	0.17 mi (0.27 km)	10 yd (9.1 m)
EF0	Storm chaser video showed a brief tornado blowing down trees.						
EF1	W of Northfield	Rice	MN	44.4328°N 93.3115°W	01:17–01:21	1.17 mi (1.88 km)	25 yd (23 m)
EF1	Trees were uprooted and lofted a couple hundred feet.						
EF0	SSW of Lakeville	Dakota	MN	44.6251°N 93.2647°W	01:53–01:54	0.18 mi (0.29 km)	25 yd (23 m)
EF0	Trees were broken and large tree branches were downed.						

=== May 20 event ===
List of confirmed tornadoes – Thursday, May 20, 2021
EF#	Location	County / Parish	State	Start Coord.	Time (UTC)	Path length	Max width
EF1	W of Hudson	Angelina	TX	31.339°N 94.8799°W	20:25–20:31	2.6 mi (4.2 km)	75 yd (69 m)
EF1	Trees were uprooted or snapped, and an outbuilding was damaged.						
EFU	NNW of Hallsville	Harrison	TX	32.5482°N 94.6067°W	21:38–21:39	0.05 mi (0.080 km)	10 yd (9.1 m)
EFU	Drone footage confirmed a very brief tornado over a pond. No damage occurred.						
EF0	NW of Cameron	DeKalb	MO	39.753°N 94.2773°W	23:06–23:07	0.88 mi (1.42 km)	50 yd (46 m)
EF0	A weak, narrow tornado snapped two power poles.						
EFU	N of Winterset	Madison	IA	41.429°N 94.017°W	02:04–02:05	0.46 mi (0.74 km)	30 yd (27 m)
EFU	Doppler radar detected a tornado debris signature, but no damage was reported.						
EF0	Moran to SE of Woodward	Dallas	IA	41.8136°N 93.9174°W	02:44–02:47	1.93 mi (3.11 km)	50 yd (46 m)
EF0	Tree limbs were broken and at least one tree was uprooted.						

=== May 22 event ===
List of confirmed tornadoes – Saturday, May 22, 2021
EF#	Location	County / Parish	State	Start Coord.	Time (UTC)	Path length	Max width
EF0	WNW of Gary	Morgan	CO	40.14°N 103.70°W	19:29–19:30	0.01 mi (0.016 km)	25 yd (23 m)
EF0	Law enforcement reported a brief tornado touched down in open country. No damage was reported.						
EF0	SE of Brush	Morgan	CO	40.19°N 103.56°W	19:46–19:47	0.01 mi (0.016 km)	25 yd (23 m)
EF0	A storm chaser reported a brief tornado touched down in open country. No damage was reported.						
EF0	SW of Midway	Washington	CO	40.22°N 103.41°W	20:02–20:03	0.01 mi (0.016 km)	25 yd (23 m)
EF0	A storm chaser reported a brief tornado touched down in open country. No damage was reported.						
EF0	W of Byers	Arapahoe	CO	39.73°N 104.42°W	20:07–20:08	0.01 mi (0.016 km)	25 yd (23 m)
EF0	Law enforcement reported a brief tornado touched down in open country. No damage was reported.						
EF0	SSW of Fleming	Logan	CO	40.52°N 102.96°W	20:44–20:45	0.01 mi (0.016 km)	25 yd (23 m)
EF0	A storm chaser reported a brief tornado touched down in open country. No damage was reported.						
EF0	WSW of Karval	Lincoln	CO	38.68°N 103.73°W	21:55–21:56	0.01 mi (0.016 km)	25 yd (23 m)
EF0	A storm chaser reported a brief tornado touched down in open country. No damage was reported.						
EF0	W of Karval	Lincoln	CO	38.73°N 103.72°W	21:59–22:00	0.01 mi (0.016 km)	25 yd (23 m)
EF0	A National Weather Service employee reported a brief tornado touched down in open country. No damage was reported.						
EF0	SSW of Punkin Center	Lincoln	CO	38.81°N 103.75°W	22:04–22:05	0.01 mi (0.016 km)	25 yd (23 m)
EF0	Law enforcement reported a brief tornado touched down in open country. No damage was reported.						
EF0	N of Punkin Center	Lincoln	CO	39.00°N 103.70°W	22:28–22:30	0.01 mi (0.016 km)	25 yd (23 m)
EF0	A trained storm spotter reported a brief tornado touched down in open country. No damage was reported.						

=== May 23 event ===
List of confirmed tornadoes – Sunday, May 23, 2021
EF#	Location	County / Parish	State	Start Coord.	Time (UTC)	Path length	Max width
EF0	N of Limon	Lincoln	CO	39.54°N 103.68°W	20:00–20:01	0.01 mi (0.016 km)	25 yd (23 m)
EF0	A brief tornado touched down in open country. No damage was reported.						
EF0	SW of Midway	Washington	CO	40.15°N 103.47°W	20:24–20:25	0.01 mi (0.016 km)	25 yd (23 m)
EF0	A brief tornado touched down in open country. No damage was reported.						
EF0	ENE of Woodrow	Washington	CO	40.03°N 103.39°W	20:52–20:57	0.69 mi (1.11 km)	25 yd (23 m)
EF0	A brief tornado touched down in open country. No damage was reported.						
EF0	NW of Akron	Washington	CO	40.21°N 103.30°W	21:14–21:15	0.01 mi (0.016 km)	25 yd (23 m)
EF0	A brief tornado touched down in open country. No damage was reported.						
EF1	ESE of Sterling	Logan	CO	40.61°N 103.14°W	21:49–22:00	0.1 mi (0.16 km)	50 yd (46 m)
EF1	Power poles were knocked down.						
EFU	NNW of Usta	Perkins	SD	45.3°N 102.19°W	21:50–21:55	2.13 mi (3.43 km)	10 yd (9.1 m)
EFU	This tornado remained over open country and caused no damage.						
EF1	N of Pringle to ESE of Custer	Custer	SD	43.67°N 103.6°W	21:55–22:05	6.6 mi (10.6 km)	20 yd (18 m)
EF1	Trees were snapped and uprooted along the path.						
EFU	S of Meadow	Perkins	SD	45.38°N 102.22°W	21:58–22:05	4.26 mi (6.86 km)	10 yd (9.1 m)
EFU	This tornado remained over open country and caused no damage.						
EF1	NE of Custer to SSW of Mount Rushmore	Custer	SD	43.78°N 103.58°W	22:04–22:13	5.86 mi (9.43 km)	10 yd (9.1 m)
EF1	Several trees were snapped.						
EF0	W of Fleming	Logan	CO	40.68°N 102.91°W	22:19–22:20	0.01 mi (0.016 km)	25 yd (23 m)
EF0	A brief tornado touched down.						
EF1	NE of Powell	Logan	CO	40.80°N 102.95°W	22:29–22:30	0.1 mi (0.16 km)	50 yd (46 m)
EF1	Power poles were knocked down.						
EF0	NE of Arriba	Lincoln	CO	39.2853°N 103.2644°W	22:45–22:50	0.5 mi (0.80 km)	25 yd (23 m)
EF0	A brief tornado touched down. No damage was reported						

=== May 24 event ===
List of confirmed tornadoes – Monday, May 24, 2021
EF#	Location	County / Parish	State	Start Coord.	Time (UTC)	Path length	Max width
EFU	NNE of Wallace	Wallace	KS	39.0868°N 101.5071°W	20:03–20:11	0.56 mi (0.90 km)	25 yd (23 m)
EFU	A spotter reported a brief tornado. Time and location were confirmed by radar. Occurred at the same time as the nearby Logan County tornado.						
EFU	NW of Smoky Hill	Logan	KS	39.1011°N 101.4696°W	20:09–20:13	0.91 mi (1.46 km)	25 yd (23 m)
EFU	Time and location were confirmed by radar. This was simultaneous with the nearby tornado NNW of Wallace.						
EFU	NNW of Wallace	Wallace	KS	39.0779°N 101.6563°W	20:42–20:48	0.96 mi (1.54 km)	25 yd (23 m)
EFU	Time and location were confirmed by radar.						
EFU	NE of Brownville	Thomas	KS	39.2084°N 101.3109°W	21:10–21:13	1.54 mi (2.48 km)	25 yd (23 m)
EFU	A brief tornado was reported by a spotter. The Location was determined by radar.						
EFU	NE of Colby	Thomas	KS	39.4079°N 100.9801°W	21:15–21:18	1.01 mi (1.63 km)	50 yd (46 m)
EFU	Spotters, storm chasers, and law enforcement reported a tornado.						
EFU	NE of Gem	Thomas	KS	39.4625°N 100.9398°W	21:44–21:46	0.46 mi (0.74 km)	25 yd (23 m)
EFU	Spotters and off-duty meteorologists reported a tornado.						
EF1	Selden	Sheridan	KS	39.5314°N 100.6375°W	23:06–23:36	5.87 mi (9.45 km)	850 yd (780 m)
EF1	A large, widely photographed multi-vortex tornado caused considerable damage in town. In Selden, shingles and roofing material were removed from homes and businesses, and windows were shattered at homes, buildings, and in vehicles. Power poles were snapped, semi-trucks and rail cars were overturned, sheds and outbuildings were destroyed, and several grain silos and some fences were blown over. A vacant brick building sustained collapse of its second floor as well. In addition to the structural damage in Selden, thousands of tree limbs were snapped and hundreds of trees were snapped or uprooted. After exiting the town to the east, the tornado overturned irrigation pivots and downed power poles before lifting near the intersection of US 83 and KS 383. Thirty-eight structures suffered significant damage, while 84 suffered minor damage. A firefighter was injured when a utility pole fell onto his truck.						
EFU	SW of Winfred	Lake	SD	43.983°N 97.366°W	01:36–1:41	3.25 mi (5.23 km)	25 yd (23 m)
EFU	A landspout moved through wetlands and fields, producing no damage.						

=== May 26 event ===
List of confirmed tornadoes – Wednesday, May 26, 2021
EF#	Location	County / Parish	State	Start Coord.	Time (UTC)	Path length	Max width
EFU	NE of Schoenchen to NW of Pfiefer	Ellis	KS	38.7537°N 99.2556°W	19:57-20:11	2.5 mi (4.0 km)	200 yd (180 m)
EFU	A stovepipe tornado developed under a low wall cloud. The tornado remained over open country and caused no damage.						
EF0	N of Pfiefer	Ellis	KS	38.7856°N 99.1494°W	20:22-20:24	0.53 mi (0.85 km)	100 yd (91 m)
EF0	A brief tornado was visible over open country. No damage was reported.						
EFU	N of Benkelman	Dundy	NE	40.1086°N 101.5391°W	21:20-21:22	1.55 mi (2.49 km)	50 yd (46 m)
EFU	A brief tornado touched down. No damage was reported.						
EF0	N of Benkelman	Dundy	NE	40.1254°N 101.5284°W	21:25-21:27	1.88 mi (3.03 km)	350 yd (320 m)
EF0	A shed was thrown 200 yd (180 m) and metal roof panels and fencing were damaged.						
EF2	N of Benkelman	Dundy	NE	40.1613°N 101.5333°W	21:39-21:59	8.29 mi (13.34 km)	575 yd (526 m)
EF2	Damage consisted of many broken power poles, a large grove of trees that was completely mowed down, additional trees that were snapped or uprooted, damage to a residence including loss of shingles, loss of metal roofing panels to a farm outbuilding, and damage to antique vehicles due to falling tree debris. A tractor was thrown 100 yd (91 m) as well.						
EFU	WNW of Stratton	Dundy	NE	40.2237°N 101.4539°W	21:49-21:52	0.15 mi (0.24 km)	50 yd (46 m)
EFU	A brief tornado was reported.						
EFU	NE of Hitschmann	Barton	KS	38.64°N 98.57°W	21:54–21:55	0.29 mi (0.47 km)	50 yd (46 m)
EFU	The tornado briefly touched down over open country. No damage was reported.						
EFU	N of Max	Dundy	NE	40.2448°N 101.4356°W	22:01-22:21	4.37 mi (7.03 km)	300 yd (270 m)
EFU	Law enforcement reported a large tornado.						
EFU	N of Hitschmann	Barton	KS	38.65°N 98.52°W	22:10–22:11	0.22 mi (0.35 km)	50 yd (46 m)
EFU	The tornado briefly touched down over open country.						
EFU	NNE of Ludell	Rawlins	KS	39.9043°N 100.9433°W	22:19–22:23	1.85 mi (2.98 km)	200 yd (180 m)
EFU	The tornado moved over open land.						
EFU	SW of Palisade	Hitchcock	NE	40.2898°N 101.2991°W	22:23-22:28	1.79 mi (2.88 km)	100 yd (91 m)
EFU	A storm spotter reported a brief tornado						
EF1	NW of Herndon	Rawlins	KS	39.9543°N 100.9033°W	22:29–22:45	3.51 mi (5.65 km)	450 yd (410 m)
EF1	The tornado caused damage on a farmstead. Numerous trees were broken or toppled, buildings lost their metal roofs and windows, while some sustained damage to their support beams. Grain silos were damaged. A house sustained shingle damage, broken windows, and was hit by a falling tree. Farther north, a farmstead schoolhouse was damaged, and power lines were snapped. The tornado also damaged oil tanks further north before lifting.						
EFU	ESE of Agate	Sioux	NE	42.41°N 103.76°W	22:43–22:52	0.37 mi (0.60 km)	20 yd (18 m)
EFU	A tornado, confirmed from spotter reports, pictures, and video, remained in rural areas with no reported damage.						
EFU	N of Herndon	Rawlins	KS	39.9717°N 100.7881°W	22:45–22:51	2.39 mi (3.85 km)	100 yd (91 m)
EFU	No distinct track Could be identified from the survey.						
EFU	NNW of Gruver	Hansford	TX	36.3481°N 101.4572°W	22:56–23:00	1.93 mi (3.11 km)	20 yd (18 m)
EFU	The tornado moved through an open field without hitting any trees or structures. The area affected could not be accessed by road.						
EFU	N of Gruver	Hansford	TX	36.3701°N 101.3945°W	23:14–23:15	0.83 mi (1.34 km)	20 yd (18 m)
EFU	The tornado moved through an open field without hitting any trees or structures.						
EFU	E of Cedar Bluffs	Decatur	KS	39.9944°N 100.45°W	23:41–23:43	1.5 mi (2.4 km)	50 yd (46 m)
EFU	A spotter reported a brief tornado.						
EF0	SW of Geneseo	Rice	KS	38.4799°N 98.1872°W	23:49–23:51	0.25 mi (0.40 km)	70 yd (64 m)
EF0	There was extensive damage to an older barn, a utility shed, and trees.						
EFU	N of Waka	Ochiltree	TX	36.3403°N 101.0653°W	00:34–00:36	1.34 mi (2.16 km)	20 yd (18 m)
EFU	The tornado moved through an open field without hitting any trees or structures. The area affected could not be accessed by road.						
EF0	Perryton	Ochiltree	TX	36.3852°N 100.8026°W	01:14–01:16	0.95 mi (1.53 km)	20 yd (18 m)
EF0	Garage doors were ripped from a car wash and storage building, two apartment buildings suffered very minor roof damage and lost siding, and a light storage building was flipped. Tree branches were broken.						
EFU	WNW of Hale Center	Hale	TX	34.0926°N 101.9235°W	01:32–02:37	1.01 mi (1.63 km)	30 yd (27 m)
EFU	The tornado remained in an open field and did not cause any reported damage.						

=== May 27 event ===
List of confirmed tornadoes – Thursday, May 27, 2021
EF#	Location	County / Parish	State	Start Coord.	Time (UTC)	Path length	Max width
EF1	SW of Bolivar	Polk	MO	37.60°N 93.44°W	16:51-16:52	0.08 mi (0.13 km)	50 yd (46 m)
EF1	A very short-lived tornado destroyed one workshop building, collapsed the wall of another, and caused minor damage to travel trailers. Trees were uprooted.						
EF1	SW of Halfway	Polk	MO	37.59°N 93.29°W	17:08-17:09	1.17 mi (1.88 km)	50 yd (46 m)
EF1	A large hay barn was severely damaged, trees were uprooted, and tree limbs were broken.						
EF0	E of Loyal	Kingfisher	OK	35.972°N 98.063°W	18:16	0.1 mi (0.16 km)	10 yd (9.1 m)
EF0	A brief tornado touched down in a field. No damage was reported.						
EFU	ESE of Louisville	Clay	IL	38.7593°N 88.4532°W	20:29–20:31	0.22 mi (0.35 km)	10 yd (9.1 m)
EFU	A brief tornado touched down in an open field. No damage was reported.						
EF0	SE of Sailor Springs	Clay	IL	38.7438°N 88.3368°W	20:43–20:49	2.76 mi (4.44 km)	50 yd (46 m)
EF0	A barn sustained minor damage and a few trees were knocked down.						
EF1	NE of Hanna	McIntosh	OK	35.265°N 95.869°W	00:13–00:17	3 mi (4.8 km)	500 yd (460 m)
EF1	A barn was damaged, trees were snapped or uprooted, and large tree limbs were snapped.						

=== May 28 event ===
List of confirmed tornadoes – Friday, May 28, 2021
EF#	Location	County / Parish	State	Start Coord.	Time (UTC)	Path length	Max width
EF1	Minden	Webster	LA	32.6373°N 93.3032°W	07:53–07:58	2.48 mi (3.99 km)	300 yd (270 m)
EF1	Damage was mainly limited to trees in town that were uprooted, or had large limbs or the upper portions of their trunks broken. Some structures were damaged by falling trees.						
EF0	Cookeville to NNE of Shady Grove	Putnam	TN	36.1309°N 85.5318°W	17:57–18:17	12.82 mi (20.63 km)	150 yd (140 m)
EF0	Numerous structures, including a church and several homes, sustained minor damage in Cookeville. Numerous trees were downed along the path, and an outbuilding sustained moderate damage. One home was severely damaged by fallen trees.						
EF0	S of Livingston	Overton	TN	36.3346°N 85.3294°W	18:13–18:14	1 mi (1.6 km)	50 yd (46 m)
EF0	A brief tornado, caught on security camera video, heavily damaged a barn and blew down numerous trees. Two people in the barn suffered minor injuries.						
EFU	SSW of Marathon	Brewster	TX	30.0262°N 103.3332°W	19:54–19:59	1.08 mi (1.74 km)	50 yd (46 m)
EFU	The tornado remained in an open field on private land. No damage was reported.						
EF0	SSW of Maxwell	Colfax	NM	36.48°N 104.58°W	20:01–20:04	0.56 mi (0.90 km)	60 yd (55 m)
EF0	A thunderstorm spawned two tornadoes: one mesocyclonic and the other, a landspout. Neither caused any damage.						
EF0	SSW of Maxwell	Colfax	NM	36.4798°N 104.571°W	20:01–20:04	0.52 mi (0.84 km)	30 yd (27 m)
EF0	A thunderstorm spawned two tornadoes: one mesocyclonic and the other, a landspout. Neither caused any damage.						
EF0	NNE of Arabela	Lincoln	NM	33.71°N 105.11°W	23:36–23:38	0.47 mi (0.76 km)	50 yd (46 m)
EF0	A storm chaser reported a tornado. There was no damage.						
EF0	NE of Westmoreland	Westmoreland	VA	38.0803°N 76.5512°E	23:58–23:59	0.11 mi (0.18 km)	50 yd (46 m)
EF0	The public reported a tornado crossing a beach.						
EF0	NE of Red Rock	Bastrop	TX	29.9832°N 97.4385°W	00:31–00:35	1.38 mi (2.22 km)	50 yd (46 m)
EF0	A small tornado formed ahead of a line of storms. Widespread wind damage made it difficult to distinguish the path.						

=== May 29 event ===
List of confirmed tornadoes – Saturday, May 29, 2021
EF#	Location	County / Parish	State	Start Coord.	Time (UTC)	Path length	Max width
EFU	SE of Marble	Gunnison	CO	38.9917°N 107.1035°W	20:30–20:31	0.65 mi (1.05 km)	20 yd (18 m)
EFU	A brief landspout, at an elevation of approximately 12,600 feet (3,800 m), lofted snow. The location was too remote for a damage survey. This is the first recorded tornado in Gunnison County on record. This also became the highest elevation tornado in United States history.						
EFU	SE of Kim	Las Animas	CO	37.15°N 103.24°W	00:24–00:29	4.96 mi (7.98 km)	100 yd (91 m)
EFU	A large tornado was reported.						

=== May 30 event ===
List of confirmed tornadoes – Sunday, May 30, 2021
EF#	Location	County / Parish	State	Start Coord.	Time (UTC)	Path length	Max width
EF0	WSW of Lake George	Park	CO	38.93°N 105.51°W	20:24–20:25	0.01 mi (0.016 km)	25 yd (23 m)
EF0	A brief tornado touched down. No damage was reported.						
EFU	NE of Trinidad	Las Animas	CO	37.25°N 104.27°W	20:25–20:35	6.61 mi (10.64 km)	150 yd (140 m)
EFU	A cone tornado was reported over open country.						
EF0	NW of Moses	Union	NM	36.74°N 103.11°W	22:10–22:11	0.44 mi (0.71 km)	50 yd (46 m)
EF0	A brief tornado touched down. No damage was reported.						
EF0	NW of Bard	Quay	NM	35.16°N 103.27°W	22:44–22:46	0.47 mi (0.76 km)	50 yd (46 m)
EF0	A brief tornado touched down. No damage was reported.						
EFU	WSW of Felt	Cimarron	OK	36.5559°N 102.838°W	22:34–22:35	0.12 mi (0.19 km)	20 yd (18 m)
EFU	Multiple storm chasers confirmed this tornado via video. The tornado remained over open grassland and produced no damage.						
EFU	W of Felt	Cimarron	OK	36.567°N 102.8362°W	22:39–22:40	0.11 mi (0.18 km)	1 yd (0.91 m)
EFU	Multiple storm chasers confirmed this tornado via video. The tornado remained over open grassland and produced no damage.						
EFU	W of Felt	Cimarron	OK	36.5748°N 102.836°W	22:43–22:44	0.12 mi (0.19 km)	1 yd (0.91 m)
EFU	Multiple storm chasers confirmed this tornado via video. The tornado remained over open grassland and produced no damage.						
EFU	S of Felt	Cimarron	OK	36.5545°N 102.7809°W	22:56–22:58	0.44 mi (0.71 km)	1 yd (0.91 m)
EFU	Multiple storm chasers confirmed this tornado via video. The tornado remained over open grassland and produced no damage.						
EFU	SE of Felt	Cimarron	OK	36.5265°N 102.7005°W	23:02–23:15	2.87 mi (4.62 km)	50 yd (46 m)
EFU	Multiple storm chasers confirmed this tornado via video. The tornado remained over open grassland and produced no damage.						
EFU	NE of Felt	Cimarron	OK	36.61°N 102.74°W	23:02–23:03	0.31 mi (0.50 km)	1 yd (0.91 m)
EFU	Multiple storm chasers confirmed this tornado via video. This tornado was on the ground simultaneously with the previous tornado. The tornado remained over open grassland and produced no damage.						
EFU	WNW of Conlen	Dallam	TX	36.27°N 102.4°W	23:13–23:16	0.82 mi (1.32 km)	100 yd (91 m)
EFU	Multiple photos and videos from storm chasers, including National Weather Service employees, confirmed this tornado. The tornado remained over open grassland and produced no damage.						
EFU	WNW of Conlen	Dallam	TX	36.2805°N 102.3641°W	23:19–23:20	0.3 mi (0.48 km)	50 yd (46 m)
EFU	Multiple photos and videos from storm chasers, including National Weather Service employees, confirmed this tornado. The tornado remained over open grassland and produced no damage.						
EFU	WNW of Conlen	Dallam	TX	36.2831°N 102.3473°W	23:21–23:22	0.32 mi (0.51 km)	25 yd (23 m)
EFU	Multiple photos and videos from storm chasers, including National Weather Service employees, confirmed this tornado. The tornado remained over open grassland and produced no damage.						
EFU	SSW of Boise City	Cimarron	OK	36.59°N 102.54°W	23:44–23:45	0.47 mi (0.76 km)	30 yd (27 m)
EFU	Multiple storm chasers confirmed this tornado via video. The tornado remained over open grassland and produced no damage.						
EFU	N of Conlen	Dallam	TX	36.33°N 102.2499°W	23:46–23:48	0.51 mi (0.82 km)	100 yd (91 m)
EFU	Multiple photos and videos from storm chasers, including National Weather Service employees, confirmed this tornado. The tornado remained over open grassland and produced no damage.						
EFU	SE of Stratford	Sherman	TX	36.3°N 102.0161°W	00:30–00:34	1.22 mi (1.96 km)	100 yd (91 m)
EFU	Multiple photos and videos from storm chasers confirmed this tornado. The tornado remained over open grassland and produced no damage.						
EF0	ESE of Stratford	Sherman	TX	36.2997°N 101.9327°W	00:43–00:53	4.61 mi (7.42 km)	150 yd (140 m)
EF0	Multiple storm chasers reported a large tornado crossing SH 15. Power lines along the highway were not damaged. Otherwise the tornado remained over open grassland and no damage was found.						

=== May 31 event ===
List of confirmed tornadoes – Monday, May 31, 2021
EF#	Location	County / Parish	State	Start Coord.	Time (UTC)	Path length	Max width
EF0	SE of Kinney Wells	Socorro	NM	33.6918°N 106.5524°W	19:00–19:06	0.92 mi (1.48 km)	50 yd (46 m)
EF0	A landspout did not produce any reported damage.						
EF0	ESE of Contreras	Socorro	NM	34.2928°N 106.6297°W	20:08–20:13	0.87 mi (1.40 km)	50 yd (46 m)
EF0	A brief landspout did not produce any reported damage.						
EFU	S of Fort Stockton	Pecos	TX	30.605°N 102.87°W	20:21–20:37	6.3 mi (10.1 km)	50 yd (46 m)
EFU	A tornado was reported by trained spotters east of US 385. The tornado remained over a very rural area and produced no damage.						
EF0	S of La Jara	Conejos	CO	37.2301°N 105.9922°W	20:30–20:35	3.54 mi (5.70 km)	20 yd (18 m)
EF0	A few power poles were snapped.						
EFU	SSE of Fort Stockton	Pecos	TX	30.5992°N 102.7347°W	20:39–20:47	3.3 mi (5.3 km)	50 yd (46 m)
EFU	A second tornado was reported by trained spotters shortly after the first tornado had dissipated. The tornado remained over a very rural area and produced no damage.						

== June ==
Confirmed tornadoes by Enhanced Fujita rating
EFU	EF0	EF1	EF2	EF3	EF4	EF5	Total
17	58	26	4	1	0	0	106

=== June 1 event ===
List of confirmed tornadoes – Wednesday, June 2, 2021
EF#	Location	County / Parish	State	Start Coord.	Time (UTC)	Path length	Max width
EFU	NE of Bethune	Kit Carson	CO	39.2991°N 102.4282°W	00:40–00:44	0.47 mi (0.76 km)	50 yd (46 m)
EFU	A brief landspout caused no damage.						

=== June 2 event ===
List of confirmed tornadoes – Wednesday, June 2, 2021
EF#	Location	County / Parish	State	Start Coord.	Time (UTC)	Path length	Max width
EF0	NW of Luxora	Mississippi	AR	35.7596°N 89.9404°W	19:01–19:02	0.11 mi (0.18 km)	25 yd (23 m)
EF0	A brief landspout tornado occurred over open land.						
EF0	SE of Rainsville	Mora	NM	35.96°N 105.21°W	20:31–20:32	1.78 mi (2.86 km)	50 yd (46 m)
EF0	A brief landspout tornado occurred, causing no damage.						
EF1	Teachey	Duplin	NC	34.7496°N 78.0315°W	20:59–21:07	2.06 mi (3.32 km)	75 yd (69 m)
EF1	Southwest of Teachey, a metal shed was destroyed and lofted, destroying an unanchored trailer. The metal roofs of multiple farm outbuildings were peeled or torn off, one of which landed on an unoccupied vehicle. Trees were snapped or uprooted in town before the tornado dissipated.						
EF0	E of Evergreen	Columbus	NC	34.3928°N 78.8632°W	21:22–21:30	0.7 mi (1.1 km)	35 yd (32 m)
EF0	Multiple metal hog structures were damaged or destroyed. One building sustained a roof collapse, and minor tree damage also occurred.						
EF0	S of Abbotsburg	Bladen	NC	34.5003°N 78.7332°W	01:04–01:05	0.25 mi (0.40 km)	20 yd (18 m)
EF0	A tornado was spotted briefly on the ground, and scattered tree damage was reported. Snapped tree branches were observed across a small area in the tornado's path.						

=== June 3 event ===
List of confirmed tornadoes – Thursday, June 3, 2021
EF#	Location	County / Parish	State	Start Coord.	Time (UTC)	Path length	Max width
EF1	N of Lee Center	Oneida	NY	43.3540°N 75.5349°W	19:26–19:29	1.2 mi (1.9 km)	75 yd (69 m)
EF1	A barn collapsed and was shifted off its foundation after its roof was lofted. Trees were snapped or uprooted as well. A tornado warning was not issued when this tornado touched down.						
EF1	Southern Jacksonville	Baltimore	MD	39.506°N 76.569°W	20:51–20:55	2.2 mi (3.5 km)	120 yd (110 m)
EF1	More than 100 trees were snapped or uprooted in the southern part of Jacksonville. The siding of a house was ton off and blown 120 yd (110 m) to the northwest, and a flagpole was blown down on the property.						
EF1	NE of Mullins	Marion	SC	34.2243°N 79.2201°W	23:45–23:49	1.24 mi (2.00 km)	70 yd (64 m)
EF1	The tornado destroyed a small storage building, caused minor damage to four mobile homes, and caused significant tree damage.						

=== June 6 event ===
List of confirmed tornadoes – Wednesday, June 2, 2021
EF#	Location	County / Parish	State	Start Coord.	Time (UTC)	Path length	Max width
EFU	SW of Blanca	Costilla	CO	37.3586°N 105.6994°W	20:22–20:25	0.05 mi (0.080 km)	20 yd (18 m)
EFU	A brief landspout occurred.						

=== June 7 event ===
List of confirmed tornadoes – Monday, June 7, 2021
EF#	Location	County / Parish	State	Start Coord.	Time (UTC)	Path length	Max width
EFU	NW of Calion	Union	AR	33.3295°N 92.5861°W	21:26–21:27	1.58 mi (2.54 km)	25 yd (23 m)
EFU	A brief, weak tornado lofted dirt and grass. No damage was reported.						
EF2	NE of Firestone to NW of Platteville	Weld	CO	40.1405°N 104.9032°W	22:59–23:34	7.5 mi (12.1 km)	50 yd (46 m)
EF2	This was a highly documented and strong landspout tornado. One outbuilding was completely destroyed while another lost roof panels, and one home lost a wall and most of its roof. Shade structures were damaged, vehicles were tossed around, and two homes had roof and window damage. Trees were uprooted and power lines were downed, and three head of cattle were killed. The tornado was visible up to 40 miles (64 km) away.						
EFU	W of Millarton	Stutsman	ND	46.6831°N 98.8534°W	01:57–01:59	1.11 mi (1.79 km)	40 yd (37 m)
EFU	A tornado touched down in an open field, causing no damage.						
EF0	SE of Mound City	Campbell	SD	45.66°N 100.05°W	01:57–01:58	0.1 mi (0.16 km)	10 yd (9.1 m)
EF0	A brief tornado touched down, causing no damage.						
EF0	SE of Elizabeth	Cass	ND	46.67°N 97.6°W	02:20–02:21	0.28 mi (0.45 km)	20 yd (18 m)
EF0	A brief tornado touched down, causing no damage but kicking up a dust plume.						

=== June 8 event ===
List of confirmed tornadoes – Tuesday, June 8, 2021
EF#	Location	County / Parish	State	Start Coord.	Time (UTC)	Path length	Max width
EF0	W of Tyler	Smith	TX	32.3097°N 95.3769°W	14:11–14:13	1.62 mi (2.61 km)	40 yd (37 m)
EF0	Soccer goals and bleachers were damaged. One tree was uprooted and two others had downed limbs.						
EF0	NE of Rusk	Cherokee	TX	31.8077°N 95.1379°W	15:02–15:03	0.25 mi (0.40 km)	20 yd (18 m)
EF0	A brief tornado broke tree limbs and left two power poles leaning.						
EF0	Reklaw	Cherokee	TX	31.8676°N 94.9897°W	15:23–15:24	0.08 mi (0.13 km)	20 yd (18 m)
EF0	A brief tornado collapsed the metal lining structure of two greenhouses, and broke large branches on a mature hardwood trees in Reklaw.						
EF0	NW of Chrisney	Spencer	IN	38.0363°N 87.0487°W	18:42–18:43	0.13 mi (0.21 km)	15 yd (14 m)
EF0	A brief, rope-like landspout touched down in open farmland. No damage was reported.						
EF0	W of Verona	Lee	MS	34.195°N 88.745°W	19:26–19:27	0.48 mi (0.77 km)	50 yd (46 m)
EF0	A brief tornado knocked down a few trees.						
EF0	NW of Verona	Lee	MS	34.213°N 88.711°W	19:28–19:29	0.4 mi (0.64 km)	50 yd (46 m)
EF0	Pipes were thrown across a highway, a fence was knocked down, and a large trailer was flipped over.						
EF0	NE of Mooreville	Lee	MS	34.286°N 88.576°W	19:42–19:43	0.4 mi (0.64 km)	50 yd (46 m)
EF0	A few trees were knocked down, damaging a mobile home and a vehicle.						
EF0	W of Patoka	Gibson	IN	38.409°N 87.593°W	22:25–22:30	1.27 mi (2.04 km)	60 yd (55 m)
EF0	The roof and side walls were torn from a barn, and a house sustained damage. Trees and crops were damaged, and one person was injured.						
EF1	Alford	Pike	IN	38.4728°N 87.2592°W	23:12–23:18	2.5 mi (4.0 km)	30 yd (27 m)
EF1	A carport was damaged in town, metal debris was found on a highway, and power lines were downed.						
EF0	SW of Little Eagle	Corson	SD	45.55°N 100.96°W	00:18–00:19	0.17 mi (0.27 km)	10 yd (9.1 m)
EF0	A tornado briefly touched down, causing no damage.						

=== June 9 event ===
List of confirmed tornadoes – Wednesday, June 9, 2021
EF#	Location	County / Parish	State	Start Coord.	Time (UTC)	Path length	Max width
EF0	SSW of Roscommon	Roscommon	MI	44.47°N 84.63°W	19:33–19:35	1.06 mi (1.71 km)	25 yd (23 m)
EF0	Trees and tree limbs were snapped.						
EFU	NW of Blakemore	Lonoke	AR	34.6064°N 91.9044°W	00:02–00:04	0.38 mi (0.61 km)	50 yd (46 m)
EFU	A brief tornado in an open field was confirmed from video. No damage was reported.						
EF0	ESE of England	Lonoke	AR	34.5187°N 91.9208°W	01:05–01:06	0.28 mi (0.45 km)	20 yd (18 m)
EF0	A very weak tornado caused damage to agriculture.						

=== June 10 event ===
List of confirmed tornadoes – Wednesday, June 2, 2021
EF#	Location	County / Parish	State	Start Coord.	Time (UTC)	Path length	Max width
EFU	S of Fairview	McKenzie	ND	47.49°N 103.94°W	23:12–23:15	0.57 mi (0.92 km)	50 yd (46 m)
EFU	A tornado touched down in an open field, causing no damage.						
EFU	S of East Fairview	McKenzie	ND	47.64°N 103.87°W	23:32–23:38	1.01 mi (1.63 km)	100 yd (91 m)
EFU	A tornado touched down in an open field, causing no damage.						
EFU	SSE of Fairview to S of East Fairview	McKenzie	ND	47.5569°N 103.9355°W	00:55–01:13	2.09 mi (3.36 km)	100 yd (91 m)
EFU	A large and long-lived tornado moved through open land, causing no damage.						
EFU	E of Williston	Williams	ND	48.16°N 103.54°W	02:57–03:00	0.92 mi (1.48 km)	40 yd (37 m)
EFU	A tornado touched down in an open field, causing no damage.						

=== June 11 event ===
List of confirmed tornadoes – Friday, June 11, 2021
EF#	Location	County / Parish	State	Start Coord.	Time (UTC)	Path length	Max width
EF0	NW of Clitherall	Otter Tail	MN	46.29°N 95.66°W	11:15–11:16	0.09 mi (0.14 km)	10 yd (9.1 m)
EF0	A tornado was captured on video.						
EF0	ENE of Missouri City	Clay	MO	39.2434°N 94.2713°W	19:29–19:30	0.03 mi (0.048 km)	15 yd (14 m)
EF0	Video of a developing storm showed a likely landspout. No damage occurred.						
EF0	SE of Ribolt	Lewis	KY	38.5749°N 83.5119°W	23:09–23:11	0.16 mi (0.26 km)	50 yd (46 m)
EF0	A brief tornado partially collapsed the roof of an outbuilding, knocked down one tree, and blew down tree limbs.						

=== June 12 event ===
List of confirmed tornadoes – Saturday, June 12, 2021
EF#	Location	County / Parish	State	Start Coord.	Time (UTC)	Path length	Max width
EF0	ENE of Frontenac	Brevard	FL	28.479°N 80.729°W	21:08–21:09	2.09 mi (3.36 km)	30 yd (27 m)
EF0	Several trees were damaged.						
EFU	SE of Las Vegas	San Miguel	NM	35.5347°N 105.0557°W	23:30–23:42	4.64 mi (7.47 km)	100 yd (91 m)
EFU	Multiple storm chasers documented a large cone tornado over open country. No damage occurred.						

=== June 13 event ===
List of confirmed tornadoes – Wednesday, June 2, 2021
EF#	Location	County / Parish	State	Start Coord.	Time (UTC)	Path length	Max width
EF0	ESE of Minco	Grady	OK	35.2825°N 97.8873°W	21:01–21:02	0.5 mi (0.80 km)	10 yd (9.1 m)
EF0	A landspout caused no damage.						

=== June 14 event ===
List of confirmed tornadoes – Monday, June 14, 2021
EF#	Location	County / Parish	State	Start Coord.	Time (UTC)	Path length	Max width
EF0	Pleasant Valley	Marion	WV	39.4730°N 80.1220°W	22:42–22:46	0.9 mi (1.4 km)	100 yd (91 m)
EF0	A well-constructed garage had shingle damage as a result of this brief, weak tornado. Several trees in the area were snapped or uprooted, including one which fell onto a home and injured one person.						

=== June 16 event ===
List of confirmed tornadoes – Wednesday, June 2, 2021
EF#	Location	County / Parish	State	Start Coord.	Time (UTC)	Path length	Max width
EF0	W of Tees Toh	Navajo	AZ	35.49°N 110.51°W	00:31–00:36	0.1 mi (0.16 km)	10 yd (9.1 m)
EF0	A landspout caused no damage.						

=== June 17 event ===
List of confirmed tornadoes – Wednesday, June 2, 2021
EF#	Location	County / Parish	State	Start Coord.	Time (UTC)	Path length	Max width
EF0	SE of Sanders	Apache	AZ	35.08°N 109.18°W	22:31–22:36	0.1 mi (0.16 km)	10 yd (9.1 m)
EF0	A landspout caused no damage.						

=== June 18 event ===
List of confirmed tornadoes – Friday, June 18, 2021
EF#	Location	County / Parish	State	Start Coord.	Time (UTC)	Path length	Max width
EF2	SE of Bryant to N of Bellfountain	Jay	IN	40.5214°N 84.9178°W	19:50–20:07	5.38 mi (8.66 km)	500 yd (460 m)
EF2	The tornado quickly strengthened to high-end EF2 intensity and passed near Portland after developing. Several farm buildings were completely destroyed with debris strewn through fields, and multiple homes at farmsteads were severely damaged. A 100 ft (30 m) telecommunications tower was toppled, and trees were snapped or uprooted along the path. Several cattle were killed.						
EF2	NW of Fort Recovery to SW of Wendelin	Mercer	OH	40.4327°N 84.7917°W	20:12–20:25	5.6 mi (9.0 km)	200 yd (180 m)
EF2	As the tornado touched down near the Indiana/Ohio state line, it lifted several roofs off of outbuildings and collapsed a cinder block wall at a lumber yard. The tornado intensified as it moved southeast, with multiple homes sustaining significant roof damage, one of which lost over half of its roof. Outbuildings were destroyed, attached garages were removed, power poles were snapped, and major tree damage occurred. Debris from destroyed outbuildings was scattered up to a half-mile away, and projectiles were embedded into the exterior wall of a building. The tornado then rapidly weakened, damaging an outbuilding and partially removing the top of a silo before dissipating.						
EF1	SE of Gratis to SW of Germantown	Montgomery, Butler	OH	39.6181°N 84.4696°W	00:38–00:43	2.75 mi (4.43 km)	100 yd (91 m)
EF1	Roofing material was lifted from a home and a barn, and trees were snapper or uprooted.						
EF1	Milan	Ripley	IN	39.1663°N 85.1963°W	00:51–00:57	6.2 mi (10.0 km)	150 yd (140 m)
EF1	Many large trees were snapped in and around Milan, with high-end EF1 tree damage observed outside of town. Homes sustained roof, siding, and gutter damage. Some trees fell onto a house near the end of the path, and a garage was destroyed.						
EF1	S of Moores Hill	Dearborn	IN	39.0595°N 85.0532°W	01:01–01:02	0.49 mi (0.79 km)	150 yd (140 m)
EF1	Two homes were damaged by this brief tornado, one of which had a large portion of its metal roof blown off. Multiple trees were downed in a convergent pattern as well.						
EF1	Idlewild	Boone	KY	39.0868°N 84.8072°W	01:09-01:14	2.75 mi (4.43 km)	175 yd (160 m)
EF1	Two barns were damaged and trees were uprooted.						
EF1	SW of DeLong to NW of Middle Grove	Knox	IL	40.7871°N 90.3382°W	04:50–05:05	10.26 mi (16.51 km)	250 yd (230 m)
EF1	Trees were broken and corn plants were snapped. Farm outbuildings were significantly damaged. This tornado was embedded a much larger area of 70 to 90 miles per hour (110 to 140 km/h) damaging straight-line winds that moved through Fulton County into Peoria County.						

=== June 19 event ===
Events in the Southeastern United States were associated with Tropical Storm Claudette.

List of confirmed tornadoes – Saturday, June 19, 2021
EF#	Location	County / Parish	State	Start Coord.	Time (UTC)	Path length	Max width
EF0	Pass Christian	Harrison	MS	30.33°N 89.23°W	05:37	0.21 mi (0.34 km)	50 yd (46 m)
EF0	Several buildings at an apartment complex in Pass Christian sustained minor damage, with siding being peeled off. AC units at three buildings were either blown over or had their support structure compromised, and one AC unit was not found. An awning attached to the front of a building was destroyed, with roofing and awning debris was found up to 1,000 yd (910 m) away in an area of trees to the northwest.						
EF0	Long Beach	Harrison	MS	30.35°N 89.18°W	07:31–07:32	1.16 mi (1.87 km)	75 yd (69 m)
EF0	Several homes sustained minor damage in town, and a pergola was destroyed in the back yard of a residence. One home had its south facing double-doors blown in, and a large camper was overturned. The garage door at another home was bashed in after a trampoline impacted it. Other minor damage occurred to vehicles, fences, and trees.						
EF0	S of Alabama Port	Mobile	AL	30.3101°N 88.1384°W	08:16–08:17	0.06 mi (0.097 km)	25 yd (23 m)
EF0	A waterspout moved ashore at the Cedar Point Pier and briefly became a high-end EF0 tornado along SR 193. A storage trailer was heavily damaged and moved 10 feet (3.0 m) and light poles and railings on the pier were damaged. The tornado may have continued north into a marsh. One person was injured.						
EF0	Pasacagoula	Jackson	MS	30.35°N 88.53°W	10:08–10:09	0.49 mi (0.79 km)	25 yd (23 m)
EF0	A short-lived, weak tornado moved through the southeast side of Pascagoula. Mostly minor tree and fence damage occurred, although the roof of a detached garage was damaged and one tree at the end of the path was partially uprooted.						
EF1	ESE of Hurley	Jackson	MS	30.62°N 88.41°W	10:35–10:37	0.83 mi (1.34 km)	50 yd (46 m)
EF1	Trees and power lines were damaged just west of the Mississippi-Alabama border.						
EF2	Riverview to East Brewton to NNW of Castleberry	Escambia, Conecuh	AL	31.0589°N 87.0649°W	12:31–12:56	22.38 mi (36.02 km)	650 yd (590 m)
EF2	The tornado first snapped trees as it touched down in the community of Riverview and moved north into East Brewton, where several mobile homes were completely destroyed at high-end EF2 strength, with large amounts of debris strewn in all directions. Trees were downed and WS Neal High school sustained significant roof damage, along with several frame homes in town. A metal fire station building and some businesses were also damaged. As the tornado exited East Brewton and continued to the north, major tree damage occurred as numerous large trees were snapped in a valley. A single-wide mobile home was obliterated, with its frame thrown 100 yd (91 m) and the owner being ejected from the structure and sustaining serious injuries. A nearby one-story home had its roof torn off, and countless trees were snapped in remote forested areas to the north of this area. As the tornado crossed into Conecuh County, it caused moderate tree damage at the west edge of Castleberry. Spotty tree limb damage continued to north of I-65, where trees were damaged north of a rest area before the tornado lifted. A total of 20 people were injured by this tornado, two seriously. Damage was $3.2 million. In November 2023, this tornado was reanalyzed and its starting point extended further south based on tree damage discovered via high-resolution satellite imagery. Small cosmetic changes to the damage path were made as well.						
EFU	N of Johnsonville	Conecuh	AL	31.30°N 86.88°W	13:53–13:58	4.16 mi (6.69 km)	120 yd (110 m)
EFU	In November 2023, a new tornado was found based on multiple uprooted trees and a notable scar visible on Planet and Worldview satellite imagery.						
EF1	NW of Blakely to NNW of Cuthbert	Early, Clay, Randolph	GA	31.43°N 84.98°W	17:31–18:44	29.01 mi (46.69 km)	400 yd (370 m)
EF1	This long-tracked tornado touched down northwest of Blakely and moved generally north-northeast, mostly causing tree damage as it passed through Zetto and just west of Coleman. Damage was most concentrated west of Cuthbert, where mobile homes and pump houses were damaged, and numerous trees were downed, including some that blocked US 82. Several spotters observed this tornado, including one that spotted the tornado as it was crossing SR 266 west of Coleman.						
EF0	NE of Huckaville	Covington	AL	31.1041°N 86.3977°W	18:12–18:14	0.63 mi (1.01 km)	25 yd (23 m)
EF0	A brief tornado downed large tree limbs and snapped some small trees.						
EF0	E of Leader	Adams	CO	39.9°N 104.04°W	20:05-20:06	0.01 mi (0.016 km)	25 yd (23 m)
EF0	A landspout briefly touched down in an open field.						
EF0	ENE of Leader	Adams	CO	39.91°N 104.02°W	20:17-20:20	0.01 mi (0.016 km)	25 yd (23 m)
EF0	A landspout briefly touched down in an open field.						
EF0	ENE of Leader	Adams	CO	39.93°N 103.95°W	20:26-20:29	0.01 mi (0.016 km)	25 yd (23 m)
EF0	A landspout briefly touched down in an open field.						
EF0	NNE of Leader	Adams	CO	39.97°N 104°W	20:34-20:35	0.01 mi (0.016 km)	25 yd (23 m)
EF0	A landspout briefly touched down in an open field.						
EF0	E of Hoyt	Morgan	CO	40.02°N 103.93°W	20:43-20:44	0.01 mi (0.016 km)	25 yd (23 m)
EF0	A landspout briefly touched down in an open field.						

=== June 20 event ===
Event in North Carolina was associated with Tropical Storm Claudette.

List of confirmed tornadoes – Sunday, June 20, 2021
EF#	Location	County / Parish	State	Start Coord.	Time (UTC)	Path length	Max width
EF0	Somerset	Chowan	NC	36.0403°N 76.4880°W	19:07–19:13	3 mi (4.8 km)	75 yd (69 m)
EF0	Weak tornado damaged and uprooted trees, including one that fell on a metal building.						
EF1	NW of Pella	Marion	IA	41.4284°N 92.9735°W	23:40–23:44	1.47 mi (2.37 km)	150 yd (140 m)
EF1	A tornado damaged outbuildings, farmsteads, and trees along its path, lifting just before it would have entered Pella.						
EF1	W of Garry Owen to NW of Washington Mills	Jackson, Dubuque	IA	42.28°N 90.85°W	01:06–01:12	3.38 mi (5.44 km)	30 yd (27 m)
EF1	Outbuildings at four farmsteads were damaged, and trees were also damaged.						
EF1	SE of Blissfield	Lenawee	MI	41.8144°N 83.8363°W	01:23–01:27	2.69 mi (4.33 km)	125 yd (114 m)
EF1	Three barns, four outbuildings, and five houses were damaged by the tornado, including one house that had its chimney toppled over. A metal silo was destroyed, and pieces of sheet metal from the structure were scattered up to a quarter-mile away. Trees were uprooted and tree branches were snapped as well.						
EF0	Addison	DuPage	IL	41.9291°N 87.9783°W	03:54-03:55	0.4 mi (0.64 km)	75 yd (69 m)
EF0	A gazebo was flipped over a fence and trees were damaged.						
EF3	Southern Naperville to Woodridge to Willow Springs	DuPage, Cook	IL	41.7451°N 88.1947°W	04:02–04:25	17.6 mi (28.3 km)	600 yd (550 m)
EF3	2021 Naperville–Woodridge tornado – This damaging low-end EF3 tornado was embedded within a squall line of severe thunderstorms, and severely damaged or destroyed many homes and apartment buildings as it moved through the Chicago suburbs of Naperville, Woodridge, and Darien. The most intense damage occurred in Naperville and Woodridge, with numerous homes sustaining loss of their roofs and some exterior walls. One poorly anchored home in Naperville was completely leveled, which was the basis for the EF3 rating. Many trees and power lines were downed along the path, and multiple cars were flipped. Minor damage to trees and tree limbs occurred in Willowbrook, Burr Ridge, and Willow Springs before the tornado dissipated. Eleven people were injured, two critically.						
EF0	Plainfield to Crest Hill	Will	IL	41.6134°N 88.2032°W	04:08–04:14	4.8 mi (7.7 km)	200 yd (180 m)
EF0	A high-end EF0 tornado touched down in Plainfield on the northern fringe of an area of damaging straight-line winds. Trees were snapped or uprooted, including several that fell on and damaged houses, and outdoor objects were blown around.						

=== June 21 event ===
List of confirmed tornadoes – Monday, June 21, 2021
EF#	Location	County / Parish	State	Start Coord.	Time (UTC)	Path length	Max width
EF0	NNE of South Haven to WNW of Woodville	Porter	IN	41.5618°N 87.1239°W	05:11–05:16	3.3 mi (5.3 km)	150 yd (140 m)
EF0	An area of damaging straight-line winds of 65 to 75 mph (105 to 121 km/h) developed over Liverpool and moved eastward, damaging trees and outbuildings before developing rotation and transitioning into this high-end EF0 tornado near South Haven. Several homes had roof shingles torn off, while numerous trees were damaged or downed along the path.						
EF1	N of Wyatt	St. Joseph	IN	41.55°N 86.18°W	06:07–06:09	1.05 mi (1.69 km)	100 yd (91 m)
EF1	Trees and outbuildings were damaged.						
EF1	Otter Lake to Southern Fremont to N of York	Steuben	IN	41.7307°N 85.003°W	06:52–07:04	10 mi (16 km)	100 yd (91 m)
EF1	This tornado developed over the I-69 and I-80/I-90 interchange, damaging trees, outbuildings, and homes before proceeded east-southeastward into the south side of Fremont. A couple of metal commercial buildings were damaged in town, one of which was unroofed, while a nearby box truck was blown over. Southeast of town, trees and barns were severely damaged, and an outbuilding was destroyed before the tornado dissipated near the Indiana–Michigan border.						
EF0	Seven Fields	Allegheny	PA	40.6731°N 80.0643°E	18:53–18:55	1.2 mi (1.9 km)	50 yd (46 m)
EF0	A weak tornado caused tree damage, including one area where six trees were uprooted. A rotten tree was uprooted elsewhere along the path. No structures were damaged.						
EF1	S of Dryden	Tompkins	NY	42.46°N 76.34°W	21:38–21:49	2.8 mi (4.5 km)	85 yd (78 m)
EF1	This low-end EF1 tornado mainly damaged trees along its path south of Dryden. A shed was blown off of its foundation on the west side of Route 38.						

=== June 24 event ===
List of confirmed tornadoes – Thursday, June 24, 2021
EF#	Location	County / Parish	State	Start Coord.	Time (UTC)	Path length	Max width
EF0	E of Bruce	Rusk	WI	45.4455°N 91.2143°W	20:32–20:35	0.84 mi (1.35 km)	25 yd (23 m)
EF0	The roof was lifted from a shed, concrete blocks were pushed over, and siding was torn from a house. A few trees were knocked down.						
EF0	Stanley	Chippewa	WI	44.9548°N 90.9336°W	21:24-21:25	0.19 mi (0.31 km)	25 yd (23 m)
EF0	A TV station video showed this tornado moving across a field on the south side of Stanley. No damage occurred.						
EFU	NE of Modesto	Macoupin	IL	39.5153°N 89.9178°W	01:18-01:19	0.23 mi (0.37 km)	10 yd (9.1 m)
EFU	A storm chaser observed a brief tornado moving across a field.						
EF0	E of Tindall	Grundy	MO	40.1572°N 93.6045°W	02:13-02:15	1.66 mi (2.67 km)	25 yd (23 m)
EF0	A QLCS tornado mainly damaged trees and powerlines, though minor structure damage occurred.						
EF0	E of Tindall to NW of Galt	Grundy	MO	40.1712°N 93.519°W	02:17-02:22	5.63 mi (9.06 km)	50 yd (46 m)
EF0	A QLCS tornado mainly damaged trees and powerlines, though minor structure damage occurred.						
EF1	NNW to ENE of Laredo	Grundy	MO	40.056°N 93.4581°W	02:18-02:21	4.88 mi (7.85 km)	75 yd (69 m)
EF1	A QLCS tornado damaged several barns and moved 2 grain bins off of their foundations.						
EFU	SW of Shelbina	Shelby	MO	39.6696°N 92.062°W	04:27-04:28	0.1 mi (0.16 km)	10 yd (9.1 m)
EFU	A brief tornado touched down in a field and was observed by a spotter.						

=== June 25 event ===
List of confirmed tornadoes – Friday, June 25, 2021
EF#	Location	County / Parish	State	Start Coord.	Time (UTC)	Path length	Max width
EF0	NE of Rensselaer	Marion	MO	39.691°N 91.500°W	05:01–05:03	0.21 mi (0.34 km)	50 yd (46 m)
EF0	One shed was completely destroyed and had its roof lofted into a nearby tree. A few other sheds were damaged.						
EF0	NNW of Hannibal	Marion	MO	39.726°N 91.409°W	05:08–05:09	0.13 mi (0.21 km)	25 yd (23 m)
EF0	A couple vinyl fences were destroyed, siding was torn off the side of a home, and tree limbs were snapped.						
EFU	SE of Fisher	Champaign	IL	40.2782°N 88.3316°W	22:27–22:28	0.12 mi (0.19 km)	25 yd (23 m)
EFU	A brief tornado touched down. No damage was reported.						
EFU	NE of Argenta	Macon	IL	40.028°N 88.7761°W	23:01–23:02	0.09 mi (0.14 km)	50 yd (46 m)
EFU	The tornado moved through open fields. No damage was reported.						
EF0	N of Cisco	Piatt	IL	40.0423°N 88.7408°W	23:08–23:10	1.49 mi (2.40 km)	50 yd (46 m)
EF0	The tornado moved through open fields, causing minor crop damage.						
EFU	SW of De Land	Piatt	IL	40.0766°N 88.6983°W	23:20–23:22	0.93 mi (1.50 km)	25 yd (23 m)
EFU	A weak, rain-wrapped tornado produced no reported damage.						
EF1	WNW of McLean	Gray	TX	35.2606°N 100.6701°W	00:01-00:06	2.2 mi (3.5 km)	40 yd (37 m)
EF1	This tornado formed along a boundary and moved East, destroying a barn and snapping tree limbs.						
EF1	NE of Dayton to WNW of Rossville	Tippecanoe, Carroll	IN	40.4338°N 86.7088°W	00:18–00:23	2.17 mi (3.49 km)	50 yd (46 m)
EF1	The roof on the east side of a barn was lifted and was thrown 20 yd (18 m) to the southeast. A small wind mill was knocked down and pointed towards the path of the tornado. Several farm vehicles were moved or overturned. Another barn had its roof lifted and its western wall collapsed. Several large tree branches were snapped, some being dragged along the ground.						
EF1	Danforth	Iroquois	IL	40.808°N 88.0024°W	01:06–01:11	1.5 mi (2.4 km)	250 yd (230 m)
EF1	A large multiple-vortex tornado began southwest of Danforth and moved northeast into town, where tree limbs were downed. Outside of town, minor damage to houses, trees, and a grain silo occurred, with one house sustaining damage to its siding.						
EF0	NNW of Burlington	Carroll	IN	40.532°N 86.426°W	01:09–01:12	2.35 mi (3.78 km)	200 yd (180 m)
EF0	The tops of trees were snapped. Some homes sustained minor shingle and siding damage.						
EF0	W of Downs	McLean	IL	40.40°N 88.93°W	01:26–01:27	0.21 mi (0.34 km)	75 yd (69 m)
EF0	A brief tornado snapped numerous trees and flattened part of a cornfield.						

=== June 26 event ===
List of confirmed tornadoes – Saturday, June 26, 2021
EF#	Location	County / Parish	State	Start Coord.	Time (UTC)	Path length	Max width
EFU	NW of Roodhouse	Greene	IL	39.5123°N 90.3957°W	18:26–18:28	0.15 mi (0.24 km)	25 yd (23 m)
EFU	A brief, narrow tornado touched down in a field. No damage was reported.						
EF0	Dyer to Schererville	Lake	IN	41.4713°N 87.5205°W	18:29–18:34	3.3 mi (5.3 km)	250 yd (230 m)
EF0	A weak tornado downed many tree limbs and a few trees in Dyer and Schererville.						
EF0	Southern Crete	Will	IL	41.4273°N 87.6465°W	19:06–19:12	4.1 mi (6.6 km)	100 yd (91 m)
EF0	This weak tornado moved through the south side of Crete, snapping many tree branches, one of which fell on and damaged the roof of a home. A rotten tree was blown over onto another house, and a gutter was ripped off of a third home.						
EF0	E of West Olive to S of Allendale	Ottawa	MI	42.9329°N 86.0620°W	19:31–19:33	2.42 mi (3.89 km)	25 yd (23 m)
EF0	This tornado snapped tree limbs and uprooted trees, with the worst damage being on Fillmore Street, where the garage door of an outbuilding was blown in and a section of its roof was lofted into nearby trees. A trailer was flipped northeast of this location.						
EF1	SE of Canadian Lakes	Mecosta	MI	43.53°N 85.27°W	19:33–19:41	2.86 mi (4.60 km)	100 yd (91 m)
EF1	A barn was destroyed and an open-air animal barn was torn apart. Some power poles were snapped after being hit by debris. A couple of center pivot irrigators were tipped over as well.						
EF0	NW of Lowell	Kent	MI	42.951°N 85.392°W	20:23–20:24	0.59 mi (0.95 km)	50 yd (46 m)
EF0	Trees and tree limbs were snapped by this brief tornado.						
EF0	E of Freeport	Barry, Ionia	MI	42.768°N 85.289°W	20:31–20:33	1.05 mi (1.69 km)	25 yd (23 m)
EF0	Barns were damaged, and the top of a silo was ripped off. Some tree damage also occurred.						
EF0	SW of Cornland	Logan	IL	39.9347°N 89.4093°W	20:35–20:36	0.21 mi (0.34 km)	75 yd (69 m)
EF0	A brief tornado caused crop damage in a corn field.						
EF1	NW of Lake Odessa to W of West Sebewa	Ionia	MI	42.806°N 85.158°W	20:40–20:49	4.95 mi (7.97 km)	50 yd (46 m)
EF1	Multiple homes and power lines were damaged.						
EF0	NE of Clare	Clare	MI	43.86°N 84.73°W	21:09–21:16	3.72 mi (5.99 km)	100 yd (91 m)
EF0	A barn wall was partly caved in, a garage-like attachment on a house was destroyed, and metal roofing was torn from a barn. Trees were snapped or sheared, and one large tree was completely de-limbed.						
EF0	Chatsworth	Livingston	IL	40.7473°N 88.293°W	21:36–21:37	0.7 mi (1.1 km)	75 yd (69 m)
EF0	A brief tornado blew out a garage door, tossed playground equipment, blew over a parked camper, and downed trees and tree limbs in Chatsworth.						
EF2	Port Austin	Huron	MI	44.0149°N 83.0386°W	21:49–22:00	6.84 mi (11.01 km)	400 yd (370 m)
EF2	Six homes were heavily damaged in Port Austin, three of which were completely unroofed. Other homes were damaged to a lesser degree, two garages and one barn were completely destroyed, and a fifth-wheel trailer was thrown and destroyed. Trees and power poles were also snapped. The tornado moved off-shore into Lake Huron before dissipating. A total of six people were injured by this tornado.						

=== June 27 event ===
List of confirmed tornadoes – Saturday, June 27, 2021
EF#	Location	County / Parish	State	Start Coord.	Time (UTC)	Path length	Max width
EFU	S of Opdyke West	Hockley	TX	33.5853°N 102.2992°W	01:54	0.02 mi (0.032 km)	30 yd (27 m)
EFU	A brief landspout touched down along a strong surface outflow boundary.						

=== June 29 event ===
List of confirmed tornadoes – Saturday, June 29, 2021
EF#	Location	County / Parish	State	Start Coord.	Time (UTC)	Path length	Max width
EF0	Doney Park	Coconino	AZ	35.27°N 111.52°W	23:00	0.1 mi (0.16 km)	10 yd (9.1 m)
EF0	A brief tornado was reported by a member of the public, as a gust front from a thunderstorm moved through.						

== See also ==
- Tornadoes of 2021
- List of United States tornadoes from January to March 2021
- List of United States tornadoes from July to September 2021
