= Doverel, Georgia =

Unincorporated community in Georgia, U.S.

Coordinates: 31°42′06″N 84°31′20″W

Doverel is an unincorporated community in Terrell County, in the U.S. state of Georgia.

== History ==
The post office in this community closed in 1902. Variant names were "Herodtown", "Dover", and "Doverell".
