= Midway, Colorado =

Unincorporated community in El Paso County, CO, USA

Midway
- Unincorporated community
- Location within Colorado
- Coordinates: 38°50′33″N 104°58′26″W
- Country: United States
- State: Colorado
- County: El Paso County
- Elevation: 9,000 ft (2,700 m)
- GNIS feature ID: 193438

Midway is an unincorporated community near the Pikes Peak Cog Railway in El Paso County, Colorado.
