= Conlen, Texas =

Conlen
- Unincorporated community
- Location within the state of Texas Conlen (the United States)
- Coordinates: 36°14′07″N 102°14′15″W
- Country: United States
- State: Texas
- County: Dallam
- Named for: Captain J. H. Conlen
- Elevation: 3,819 ft (1,164 m)

Population (2000)
  - Total: 69
- Time zone: UTC-6 (Central (CST))
  - Summer (DST): UTC-5 (CDT)
- GNIS feature ID: 1379585

Conlen is an unincorporated community in eastern Dallam County, Texas, United States. According to the Handbook of Texas, the community had a population of 69 in 2000.

== History ==
In 1903, Conlen was established. It was named after Capt. J. H. Conlen, a Spanish-American War veteran who oversaw the construction of the Chicago, Rock Island and Pacific Railroad, which traveled through the Texas counties of Sherman, Dallam, and Hartley and connected Liberal, Kansas, with Santa Rosa, New Mexico. Conlen made it through the terrible years of the Dust Bowl and afterward, with the installation of irrigation wells, restored its grain-based economy. In 1940, Conlen had 150 residents and four businesses; by 1948, that number had dropped to 62, and there were only three businesses. In 1990 and 2000, Conlen's population was recorded as 61 and 69, respectively. It went down to 18 in 2017.

On July 6, 1943, Boise City, Oklahoma, was mistakenly bombed by a U.S. Army Air Forces plane that had taken off from the nearby Dalhart Army Air Base. The pilot, sent on a training mission to drop explosives on a practice range near Conlen, got off course, mistook Boise City for the range, and dropped five bombs on the town. Although there was slight damage to buildings, nobody was injured, and the air raid was stopped after the town was blacked out by an alert power plant worker.

On May 18, 2010, an EF0 tornado struck Conlen. It was tracked over rural rangeland. On May 30, 2021, four brief, EFU tornadoes struck Conlen. Multiple photos and videos from storm chasers, including National Weather Service employees, confirmed these tornadoes. They remained over open grassland and produced no damage.

=== "Big Tex" Statue ===
"Big Tex" is a tourist attraction in Conlen. It is a 20-foot-tall statue of a cowboy with bow-legs. The statue dates back to the 1950s when it was the entrance to the Cowboy Cafe, a restaurant with a museum and gift shop located in Dalhart. The current owner of the statue is Elliot Crabtree. His father moved it from Dalhart to Conlen in the 1960s.

== Geography ==
Conlen is located at the intersection of U.S. Route 54 and Farm to Market Road 807, 19 mi (31 km) northeast of Dalhart and 11 mi (18 km) southwest of Stratford in eastern Dallam County.

== Education ==
Conlen's high school girls' basketball team, which was sponsored by the Conlen Mercantile Company, was the winner of the state championship in 1934. Today, the community is served by the Stratford Independent School District.
