= Quanah High School =

Location
- 501 W 7th St. Quanah, Texas 79252; United States; 34.2943°N 99.7456°W

Information
- School type: Public High School
- School district: Quanah Independent School District
- Teaching staff: 23.64 (FTE)
- Grades: 9-12
- Enrollment: 143 (2023–2024)
- Student to teacher ratio: 6.05
- Colors: Black & Gold
- Athletics conference: UIL Class 2A
- Mascot: Indian/Lady Indian
- Website: Quanah High School

Quanah High School is a public high school located in the city of Quanah, Texas (USA) and classified as a 2A school by the UIL. It is part of the Quanah Independent School District located in central Hardeman County. In 2015, the school was rated "Met Standard" by the Texas Education Agency.

== Academics ==
- Calculator Applications -
  - 1993(2A)
- Journalism -
  - 1961(2A), 1968(2A)
- Literary Criticism -
  - 2006(1A)
- Number Sense -
  - 1991(2A)

== Athletics ==
The Quanah Indians compete in these sports -

Volleyball, Cross Country, Football, Basketball, Golf, Tennis, Track, Softball & Baseball

=== State titles ===
- Boys Golf -
  - 1994(2A)

==== State Finalist ====
- Football -
  - 1961(2A), 1988(2A)

== Notable alumni ==
- John Gilliland (Class of 1953) - radio broadcaster.
- Edward Givens (Class of 1946) - astronaut.
- George Boynton - football player
