= Quanah, Acme and Pacific Railway =

Railway in Texas

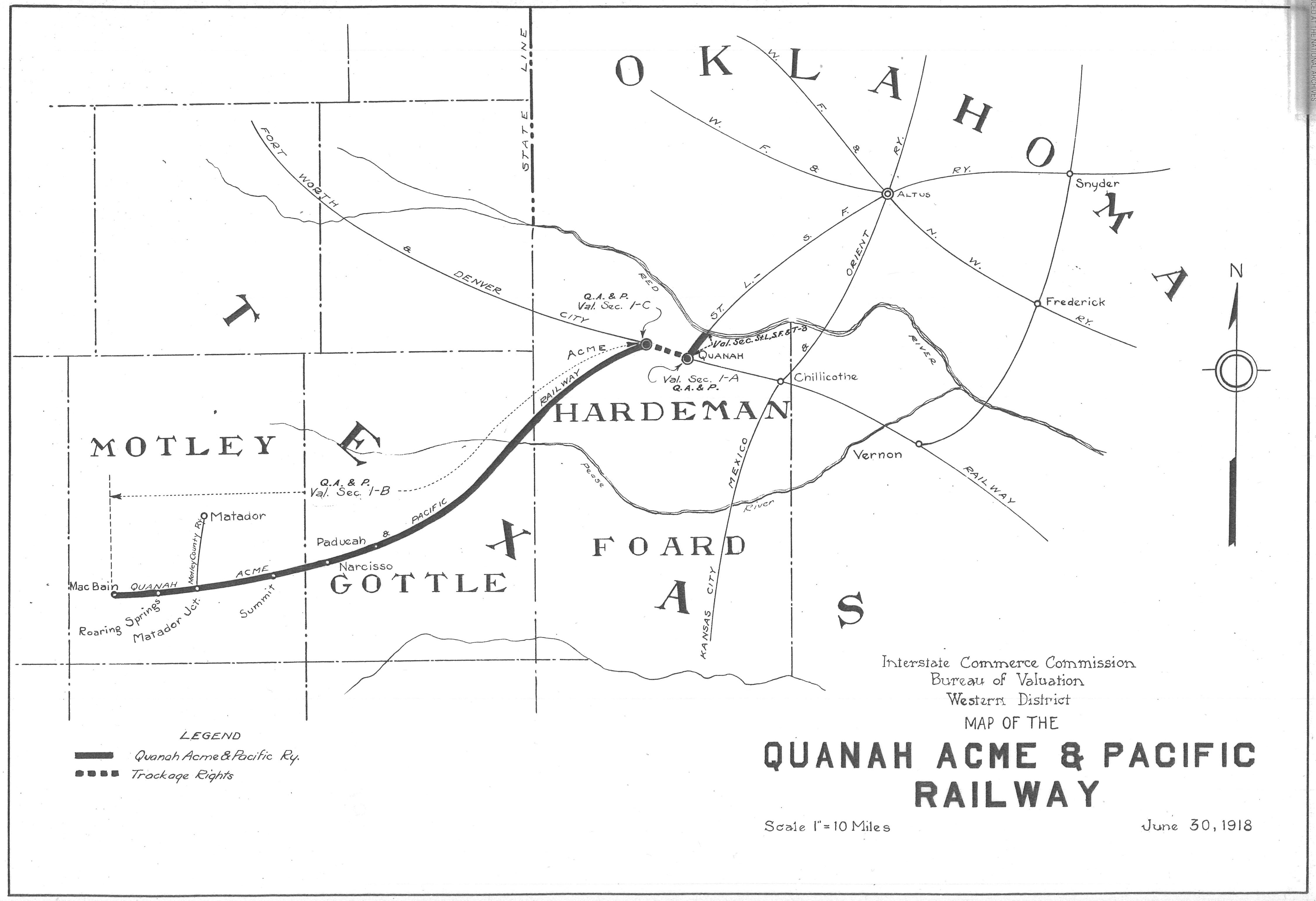
- 1918 map of the railroad

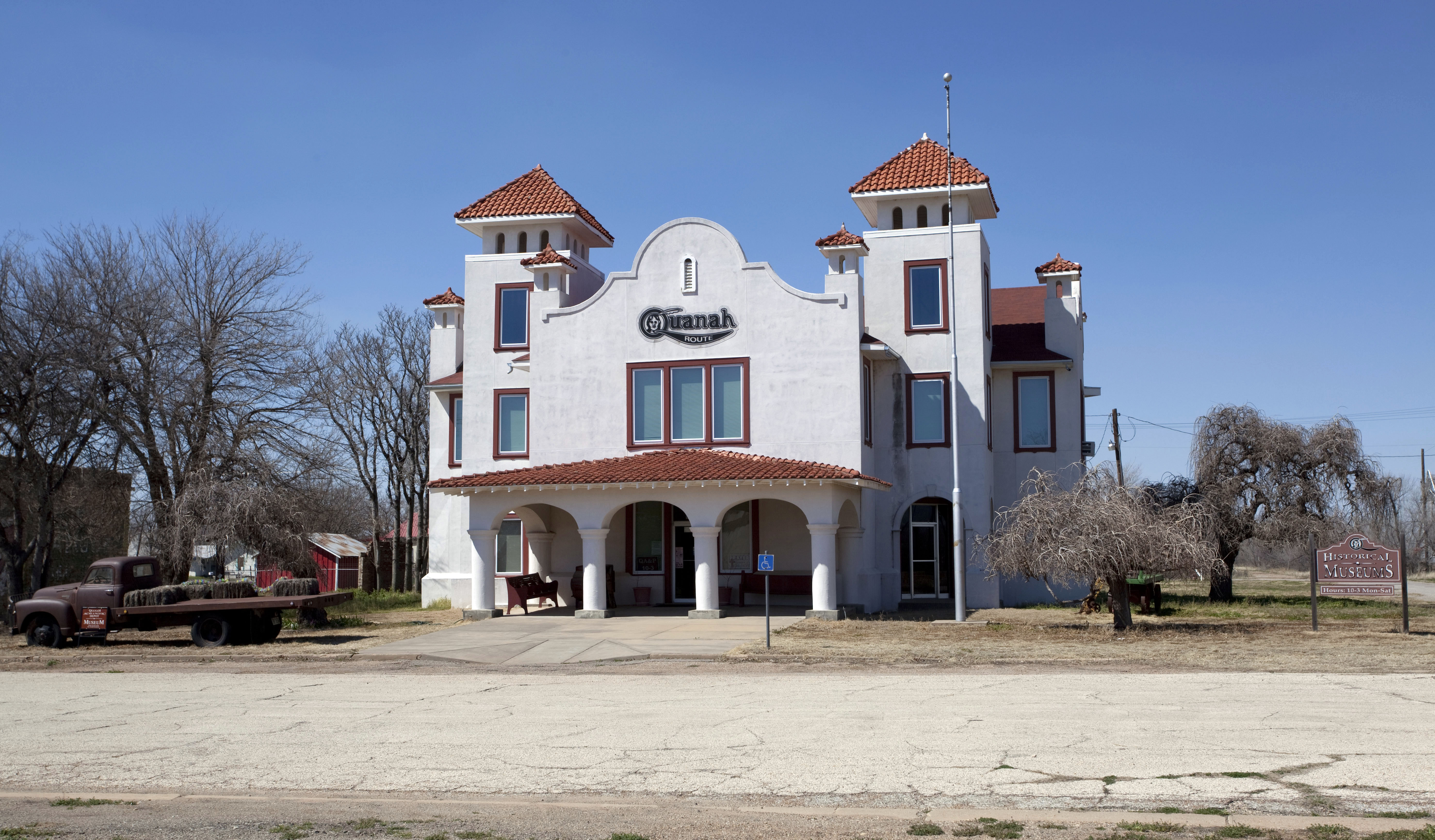
- Former railway depot in Quanah, Texas

Overview
- Dates of operation: 1902–1981
- Predecessor: Acme, Red River and Northern Railway
- Successor: Burlington Northern Railroad

Quanah, Acme and Pacific Railway (QA&P) was a 117-mile (188 km) freight railroad that operated between the Red River and Floydada, Texas, from 1902 until it was merged into the Burlington Northern Railroad in 1981.

== History ==
On May 3, 1902, the line was incorporated as the Acme, Red River and Northern Railway. The founders' original, never-realized plans were to extend the line 500 miles (800 km) from the Red River to El Paso, Texas.

On January 28, 1909, the railroad assumed the name of the Quanah, Acme and Pacific. One of the largest shareholders was Harry Koch.

In 1911, the St. Louis–San Francisco Railway assumed control of the QA&P.

On June 8, 1981, the QA&P was merged into the Burlington Northern Railroad, which had merged the QA&P's corporate parent, the St. Louis–San Francisco Railway, on November 21, 1980.

The Burlington Northern Railroad abandoned the former QA&P line west of Paducah in 1982.

== Traffic ==
Freight stops on the QA&P were Red River, Carnes, Quanah, Acme, Lazare, Swearingen, Paducah, Narcisso, Summit (Motley County), Russellville, Roaring Springs, MacBain, Dougherty, Boothe Spur, and Floydada. In 1925, QA&P reported 8 million ton-miles of revenue freight on 91 miles of line; in 1944, it had 51 million and in 1967, 130 million, both on 120 route-miles.

However, QA&P's traffic mostly was overhead freight — between the St. Louis–San Francisco Railway at the Red River and the Atchison, Topeka and Santa Fe Railway at Floydada. Starting in the 1960s, the QLA freight train via Floydada was scheduled to arrive in Los Angeles 38½-to-40 hours after leaving Tulsa. The railroad's traffic diminished after 1973 when overhead trade took a shorter route via Avard, OK.
