= Medicine Mounds =

Group of hills in Texas, US

- Location within Texas

Highest point
- Elevation: 1,713 ft (522 m)
- Coordinates: 34°11′15″N 99°37′25″W

Naming
- Etymology: The Comanche placed medicinal plants at the peaks as offerings to spirits living at the peaks.

Geography
- Country: United States
- State: Texas
- County: Hardeman

The Medicine Mounds are a group of four hills, located in Hardeman County, Texas, United States. The four hills are Big Mound (1,713 feet (522 m)), Cedar Mound (1,650 feet (500 m)), Third Mound (1,610 feet (490 m)) and Little Mound (1,580 feet (480 m)). The Comanche believed spirits lived on the peaks, and placed medicinal plants at the peaks as offerings.

The Medicine Mounds are the namesake for Medicine Mound, Texas.
