= Quanah =

Quanah may refer to:

- Quanah Parker (c. 1845 – 1911), Native American leader
- Quanah, Texas, a city in the United States
