= Chillicothe, Texas =

City in Hardeman County, Texas, United States

- City
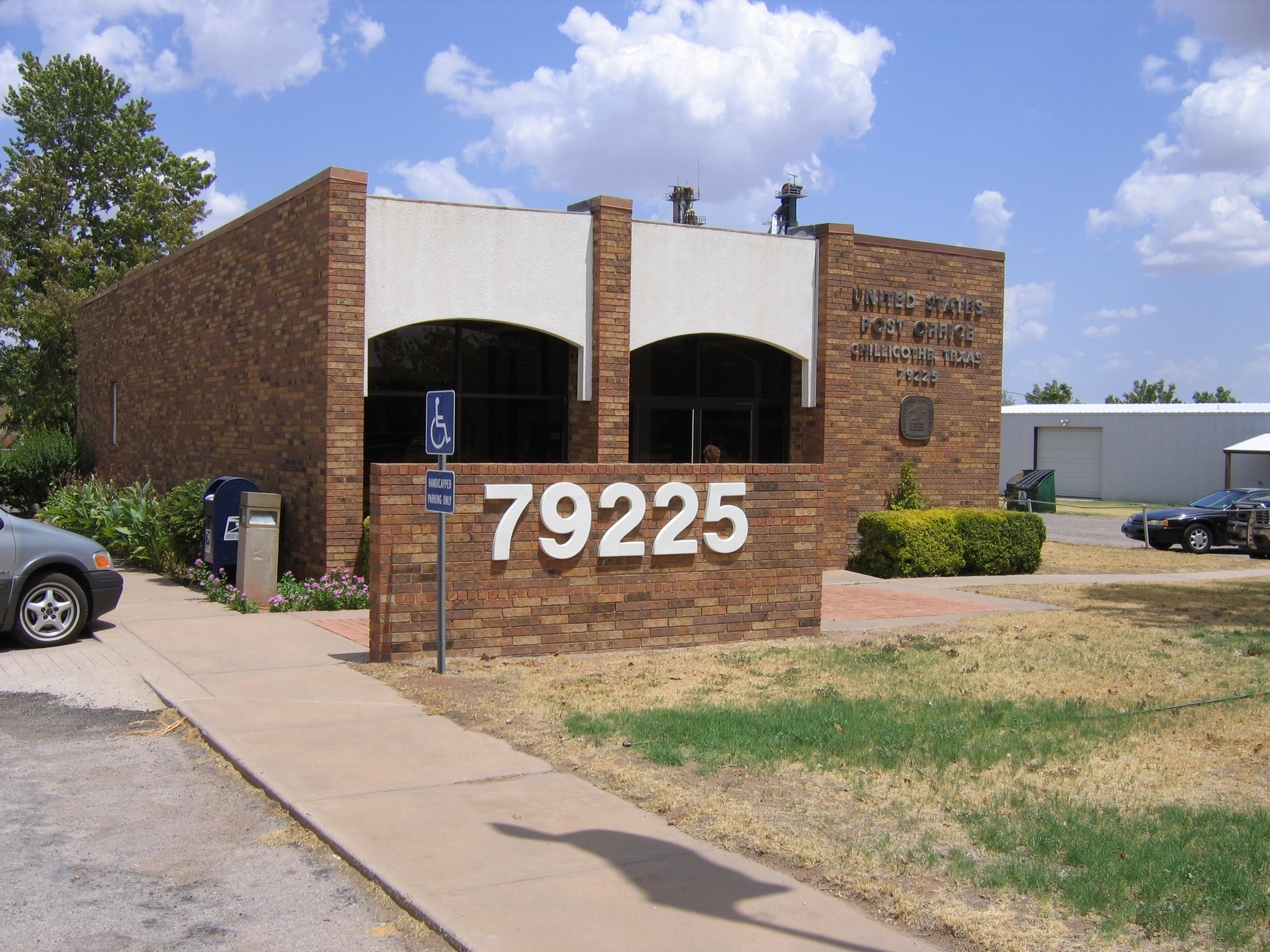
- Chillicothe post office, August 2006

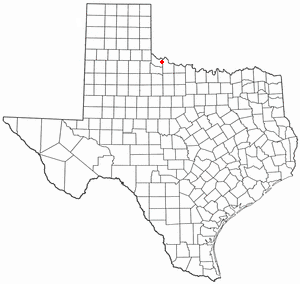
- Location of Chillicothe, Texas

- Coordinates: 34°15′22″N 99°30′52″W
- Country: United States
- State: Texas
- County: Hardeman

Area
  - Total: 1.02 sq mi (2.64 km^{2})
  - Land: 1.02 sq mi (2.64 km^{2})
  - Water: 0 sq mi (0.00 km^{2})
- Elevation: 1,401 ft (427 m)

Population (2023)
  - Total: 549
  - Density: 539/sq mi (208/km^{2})
- Time zone: UTC-6 (Central (CST))
  - Summer (DST): UTC-5 (CDT)
- ZIP code: 79225
- Area code: 940
- FIPS code: 48-14680
- GNIS feature ID: 2409450
- Website: chillicothetx.com

Chillicothe is a city in Hardeman County, Texas, United States. The population was 549 at the 2020 census.

== History ==
Chillicothe is on U.S. Route 287 (US 287), Farm to Market Road 91, Farm to Market Road 2006, and the Fort Worth and Denver and Santa Fe railroads in eastern Hardeman County. It was founded in the early 1880s and developed rapidly after the construction of the Fort Worth and Denver City Railway in 1887. The community, named by A. E. Jones for his hometown in Missouri, grew up on Wanderer's Creek near the headquarters of W. H. Worsham's R2 Ranch in the 1870s. The post office was established in 1883 with Charles E. Jones as postmaster. A fire destroyed the town in 1890, and citizens rebuilt south of the rail line rather than north.

Pioneers include Sam L. Crossley, who became the first mayor in 1903, J. J. Britt, J. A. Shires, and W. L. Ledbetter. Wheat elevators were constructed in 1892–1893, and the town was incorporated in 1907 with a population of 800. Additional rail service from the Kansas City, Mexico and Orient Railway began in 1908. Chillicothe is called the Iris Village because of the many irises gracing the town. The population was 1,610 in 1930 and has been declining ever since. Chillicothe has a hospital, a newspaper, and other businesses.

The Chillicothe Hospital officially closed effective July 22, 2019 after 70 years of service.

== Geography ==
Chillicothe is located in eastern Hardeman County and US 287 runs through the center of town, leading southeast 16 miles (26 km) to Vernon and west 13 miles (21 km) to Quanah, the Hardeman county seat.

According to the United States Census Bureau, the city has a total area of 1.0 square mile (2.6 km^{2}), all land. Wanderers Creek runs past the western side of the city, flowing north towards the Red River at the Oklahoma state line.

=== Climate ===
According to the Köppen Climate Classification system, Chillicothe has a semi-arid climate, abbreviated "BSk" on climate maps.

== Demographics ==
=== 2020 census ===
As of the 2020 census, Chillicothe had a population of 549 people, 228 households, and 214 families residing in the city.

The median age was 38.3 years. 25.0% of residents were under the age of 18 and 20.0% of residents were 65 years of age or older. For every 100 females there were 108.0 males, and for every 100 females age 18 and over there were 99.0 males age 18 and over.

0% of residents lived in urban areas, while 100.0% lived in rural areas.

Of the 228 households in Chillicothe, 35.1% had children under the age of 18 living in them. Of all households, 50.4% were married-couple households, 19.7% were households with a male householder and no spouse or partner present, and 22.8% were households with a female householder and no spouse or partner present. About 26.3% of all households were made up of individuals and 11.4% had someone living alone who was 65 years of age or older.

There were 281 housing units, of which 18.9% were vacant. Among occupied housing units, 64.0% were owner-occupied and 36.0% were renter-occupied. The homeowner vacancy rate was 3.7% and the rental vacancy rate was 10.9%.

Racial composition as of the 2020 census
Race	Percent
White	63.9%
Black or African American	2.7%
American Indian and Alaska Native	0.7%
Asian	0%
Native Hawaiian and Other Pacific Islander	0%
Some other race	21.7%
Two or more races	10.9%
Hispanic or Latino (of any race)	37.9%

=== 2000 census ===
Historical population
Census	Pop.	Note	%±
1910	1,207		—
1920	1,351		11.9%
1930	1,610		19.2%
1940	1,423		−11.6%
1950	1,415		−0.6%
1960	1,161		−18.0%
1970	1,116		−3.9%
1980	1,052		−5.7%
1990	816		−22.4%
2000	798		−2.2%
2010	707		−11.4%
2020	549		−22.3%
U.S. Decennial Census

As of the census of 2000, there were 798 people, 310 households, and 212 families residing in the city. The population density was 787.3 inhabitants per square mile (304.0/km^{2}). There were 373 housing units at an average density of 368.0 per square mile (142.1/km^{2}). The racial makeup of the city was 87.47% White, 5.64% African American, 1.38% Native American, 4.26% from other races, and 1.25% from two or more races. Hispanic or Latino of any race were 10.90% of the population.

There were 310 households, out of which 37.7% had children under the age of 18 living with them, 53.2% were married couples living together, 13.5% had a female householder with no husband present, and 31.6% were non-families. 28.7% of all households were made up of individuals, and 18.1% had someone living alone who was 65 years of age or older. The average household size was 2.57 and the average family size was 3.24.

In the city, the population was spread out, with 31.1% under the age of 18, 6.1% from 18 to 24, 26.2% from 25 to 44, 21.2% from 45 to 64, and 15.4% who were 65 years of age or older. The median age was 35 years. For every 100 females, there were 84.3 males. For every 100 females age 18 and over, there were 75.7 males.

The median income for a household in the city was $25,625, and the median income for a family was $31,250. Males had a median income of $26,645 versus $20,333 for females. The per capita income for the city was $12,450. About 17.0% of families and 16.7% of the population were below the poverty line, including 18.7% of those under age 18 and 13.5% of those age 65 or over.

== Education ==
The city is served by the Chillicothe Independent School District and is home to Chillicothe High School.

== Gallery ==
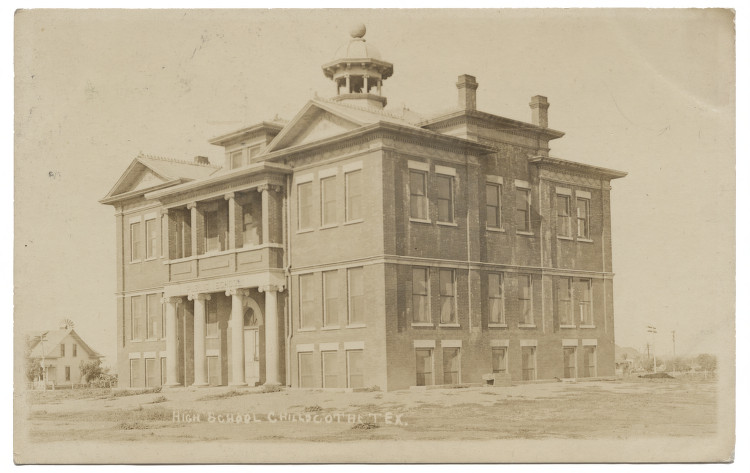
Chillicothe High School, Western mural in Chillicothe

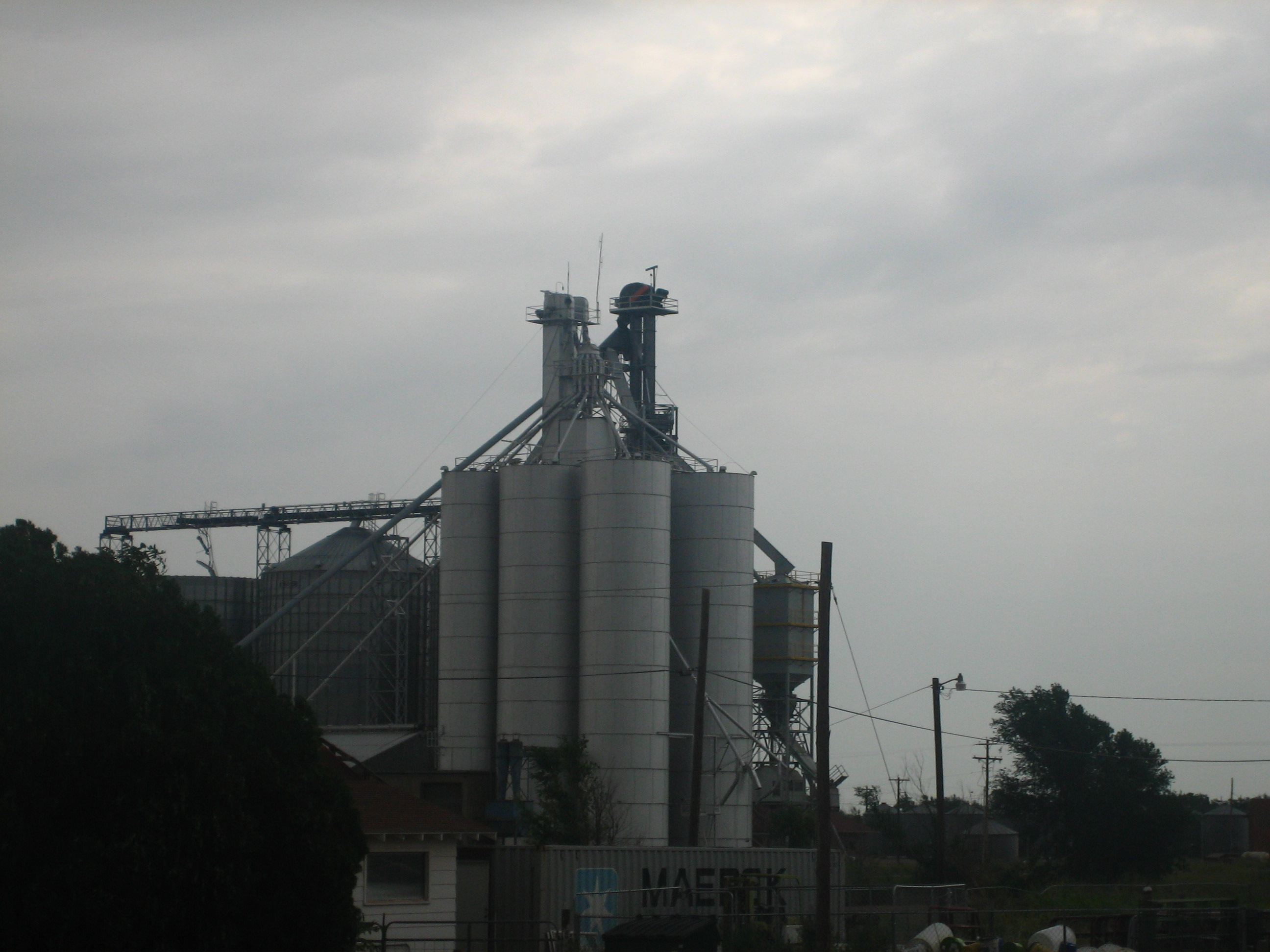
Grain elevator at Chillicothe

== Notable people ==
- Monroe Parker, college president
- (Hoyt) Clay Puett, born here in 1899, the inventor of Electric Starting Gate
- Herschel Ramsey, professional football player
- Lew Williams, rockabilly singer

== See also ==
- List of municipalities in Texas
