= Red Ramsey =

American football player (1911–1984)

No. 12, 88
- Position: End

Personal information
- Born: April 9, 1911; Chillicothe, Texas, U.S.
- Died: April 19, 1984 (aged 73); Kaufman County, Texas, U.S.
- Listed height: 6 ft 0 in (1.83 m)
- Listed weight: 196 lb (89 kg)

Career information
- High school: Chillicothe
- College: Texas Tech
- NFL draft: 1938: 6th round, 42nd overall pick

Career history
- Philadelphia Eagles (1938–1940; 1945)

Awards and highlights
- First-team Little All-American (1935)

Career NFL statistics
- Receptions: 53
- Receiving yards: 624
- Receiving touchdowns: 2
- Stats at Pro Football Reference

Herschel Randolph "Red" Ramsey (April 9, 1911 – April 19, 1984) was an American professional football player who was an end for four seasons with the Philadelphia Eagles of the National Football League (NFL). Ramsey played college football for the Texas Tech Red Raiders and was selected 42nd overall in the sixth round of the 1938 NFL draft, becoming the first football player drafted from Texas Technological College (now Texas Tech University).
