= Medicine Mound, Texas =

Ghost town in Texas, US

- Ghost town
- Location in Texas
- Coordinates: 34.1878599°N 99.5945350°W
- Country: United States
- State: Texas
- County: Hardeman
- Census code: 47376
- USGS Feature ID: 1362566

Medicine Mound is a ghost town in Hardeman County, Texas, United States.

== History ==
Medicine Mound is situated on Farm to Market Road 1167. It is named for the Medicine Mounds, four mounds south of the town, which the Comanche believed to be the home of powerful spirits.

After the construction of the Kansas City, Mexico and Orient Railway in 1908, the town moved 2.5 miles north. It had a population of 500 at its peak, and 22 businesses. Most of the buildings were destroyed by a 1932 fire. In 1940, the town had six stores and 210 people. The school and post office shut down in the 1950s, combining with nearby Quanah.
