= Chillicothe High School (disambiguation) =

Chillicothe High School may refer to:

- Chillicothe High School, Chillicothe, Ohio
- Illinois Valley Central High School (formerly Chillicothe High School) in Chillicothe, Illinois
- Chillicothe High School located in Chillicothe, Missouri
- Chillicothe High School (Texas), Chillicothe, Texas
