= National Register of Historic Places listings in Hardeman County, Texas =

Location of Hardeman County in Texas

Hardeman County, Texas, has one district and one individual property listed on the National Register of Historic Places. The district contains several Recorded Texas Historic Landmarks, one of which is also a State Antiquities Landmark. The individual property is a Recorded Texas Historic Landmark.

This National Park Service list is complete through NPS recent listings posted September 4, 2026.

== Current listings ==
The locations of National Register properties and districts may be seen in a mapping service provided.

	Name on the Register	Image	Date listed	Location	City or town	Description
1	Quanah Commercial Historic District	Quanah Commercial Historic District	May 25, 2000 (#00000475)	Roughly bounded by Green, Second, Third, Fourth, Fifth, King, Elbert, and McClelland Sts., and Burlington Northern RR tr 34°17′53″N 99°44′22″W	Quanah	Includes State Antiquities Landmark, Recorded Texas Historic Landmarks
2	Quanah, Acme and Pacific Railway Depot	Quanah, Acme and Pacific Railway Depot	October 15, 1979 (#79002951)	100 Mercer St. 34°17′14″N 99°44′52″W	Quanah	Recorded Texas Historic Landmark; depot of the Quanah, Acme and Pacific Railway

== See also ==
- National Register of Historic Places listings in Texas
- Recorded Texas Historic Landmarks in Hardeman County
