= George Boynton =

American football player (born 1937)

No. 27
- Positions: Defensive back, halfback

Personal information
- Born: July 6, 1937 (age 89); Los Angeles, California, U.S.
- Listed height: 5 ft 11 in (1.80 m)
- Listed weight: 190 lb (86 kg)

Career information
- High school: Quanah (Quanah, Texas)
- College: East Texas A&M
- NFL draft: 1960: 16th round, 191st overall pick

Career history
- Oakland Raiders (1962); Louisville Raiders (1962)

Awards and highlights
- National Junior College All-American (1958)
- Stats at Pro Football Reference

George Douglas Boynton (born July 6, 1937) is an American former football player who played college football for East Texas A&M from 1959 to 1961 and professional football for the Oakland Raiders in 1962.

== Early years ==
Boynton was born in Los Angeles in 1937. He attended Quanah High School in Quanah, Texas.

== College football ==
Boynton played college football as a halback at Ranger Junior College (Ranger, Texas) in 1957 and 1958. During the 1958 season, he scored 42 points, tallied 800 rushing yards, completed 10 of 15 passes, and played at halfback on defense as well as offense. At the end of the 1958 season, he was selected as a first-string player on the National Junior College All-American team, the first Ranger player to receive the honor. He also played in the Junior College All-Amerian Bowl game in 1958. Boynton also played at the guard position on the Ranger basketball team.

In 1959, Boynton transferred to East Texas A&M University, playing college football as a halfback for the East Texas A&M Lions from 1959 to 1961. While at East Texas, he twice received all-conference honors and was also named to the All-Texas team.

== Professional football ==
Boynton was selected by the Baltimore Colts in the 16th round of the 1960 NFL draft (191st overall pick), but he returned to East Texas A&M for the 1960 and 1961 seasons.

In January 1962, Boynton was signed by the Oakland Raiders of the American Football League. He played in three games for the Raiders. He also played for the Louisville Raiders of the United Football League during the 1962 season.
