= Copper Breaks State Park =

State park in Texas, United States

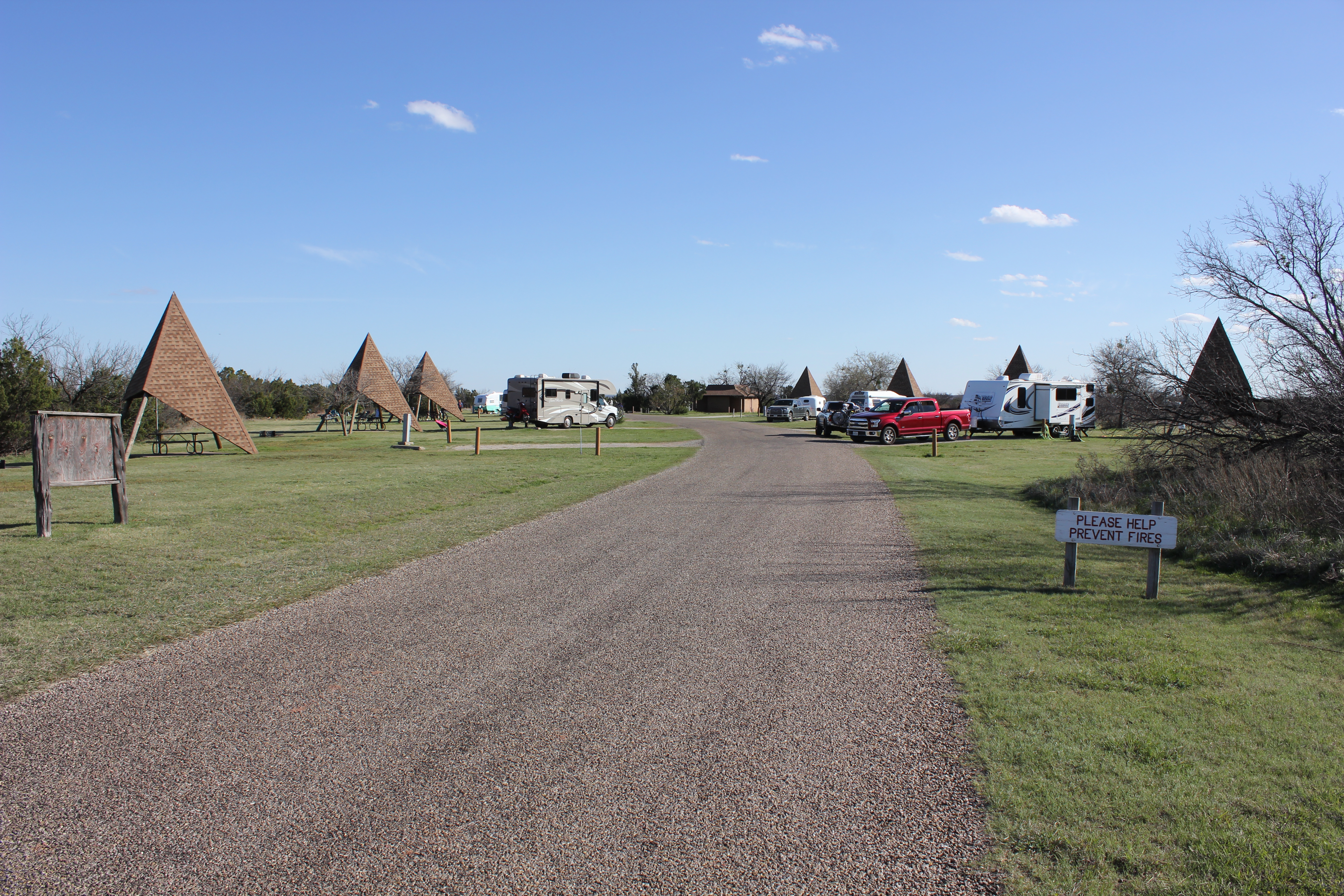
- Camping area in Copper Breaks State Park

- Location within Texas Location within the United States
- Location: Hardeman County, Texas
- Nearest city: Quanah
- Coordinates: 34°6′41″N 99°45′9″W
- Area: 1,898.8 acres (768 ha)
- Established: 1974
- Visitors: 29,917 (in 2025)
- Governing body: Texas Parks and Wildlife Department
- Website: Official site

Copper Breaks State Park is a state park in Hardeman County, Texas, United States, managed by the Texas Parks and Wildlife Department (TPWD). The park covers 1,898.8 acres (768.4 ha) and opened in 1974.

== History ==
The red-brown and green-gray mudstone visible in the landforms was laid down roughly 200–250 million years ago when the area was an inland seabed. Erosion changed the level plains into rough badlands. The green-gray deposits contain raw copper, but none is mined within the park. Commercial attempts at mining the copper in the 1800s were not successful.

Originally, Copper Breaks was part of the land held by the Comanche and Kiowa. Comanche mound sites can be found in Hardeman County, but not in the park itself. From the late 1940s and through the 1960s, the Gosage family owned the land and let the community use it for recreational use. In the 1970s, The State of Texas purchased the property and it was opened in stages by the TPWD between 1972 and 1974.

== Nature ==
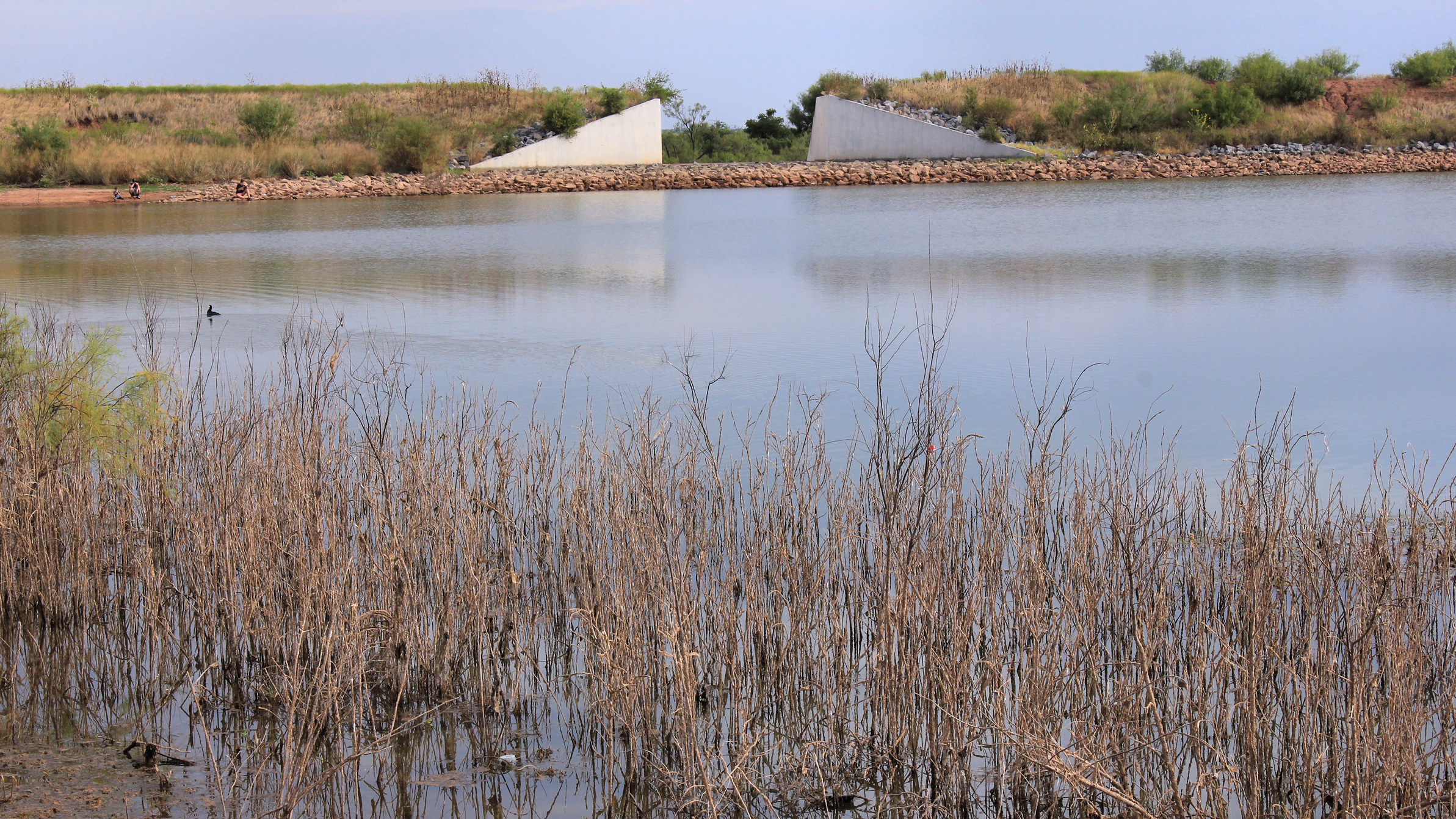
Copper Breaks Lake

The park has two bodies of water: Copper Breaks Lake and Big Pond. It also includes a portion of the official state Texas Longhorn herd.

=== Plants ===
Copper Breaks is a semiarid region receiving 23.4 inches (590 mm) of rainfall in an average year, allowing the growth of bunch grasses and narrow, shallow breaks of honey mesquite, redberry juniper, eastern cottonwood, some scattered native pecan, netleaf hackberry, western soapberry, and a variety of wildflowers.

=== Animals ===
Wildlife observed in the park includes white-tailed deer, mule deer, eastern cottontail, common raccoon, Mexican long-nosed armadillo, bobcat, North American porcupine, and coyote. Greater roadrunner, great blue heron, red-winged blackbird, northern bobwhite, Eurasian collared-dove, northern cardinal, great horned owl, northern flicker, eastern bluebird, Mississippi kite, Cooper's hawk, northern mockingbird, and many species of ducks are just a few of the many species of birds found in the park. Blanchard's cricket frog, plains leopard frog, red-eared slider, pond slider, greater earless lizard, eastern collared lizard, and western diamond-backed rattlesnake can be seen, as well as an occasional Texas horned lizard. Lake Copper Breaks is stocked with rainbow trout and channel catfish each winter.

== Activities ==
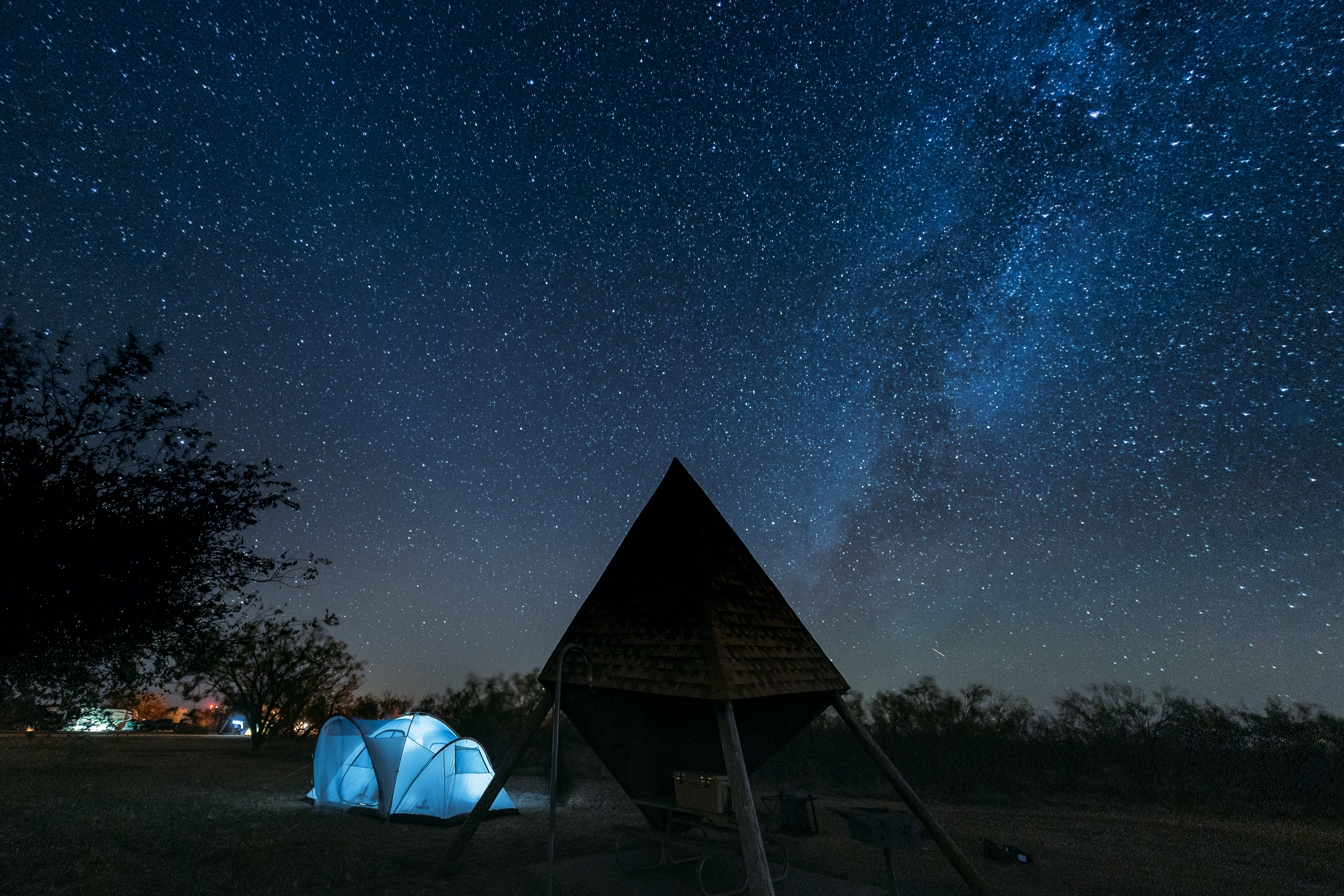
Stargazing at Copper Breaks State Park with Milky Way Galaxy

Camping, picnicking, birdwatching, nature study, swimming, hiking, cycling horseback riding, and fishing in the lake or pond are available in the park.

=== Stargazing ===
Copper Breaks is an International Dark-Sky Park and hosts a stargazing program once a month from April through October. The park's Bortle Scale rating is a Class 2, which indicates that a very low amount of light pollution there makes it a great place for celestial photography.

== See also ==
- List of Texas state parks
