= Welborn Griffith =

American soldier (1901–1944)

Welborn Barton Griffith Jr.
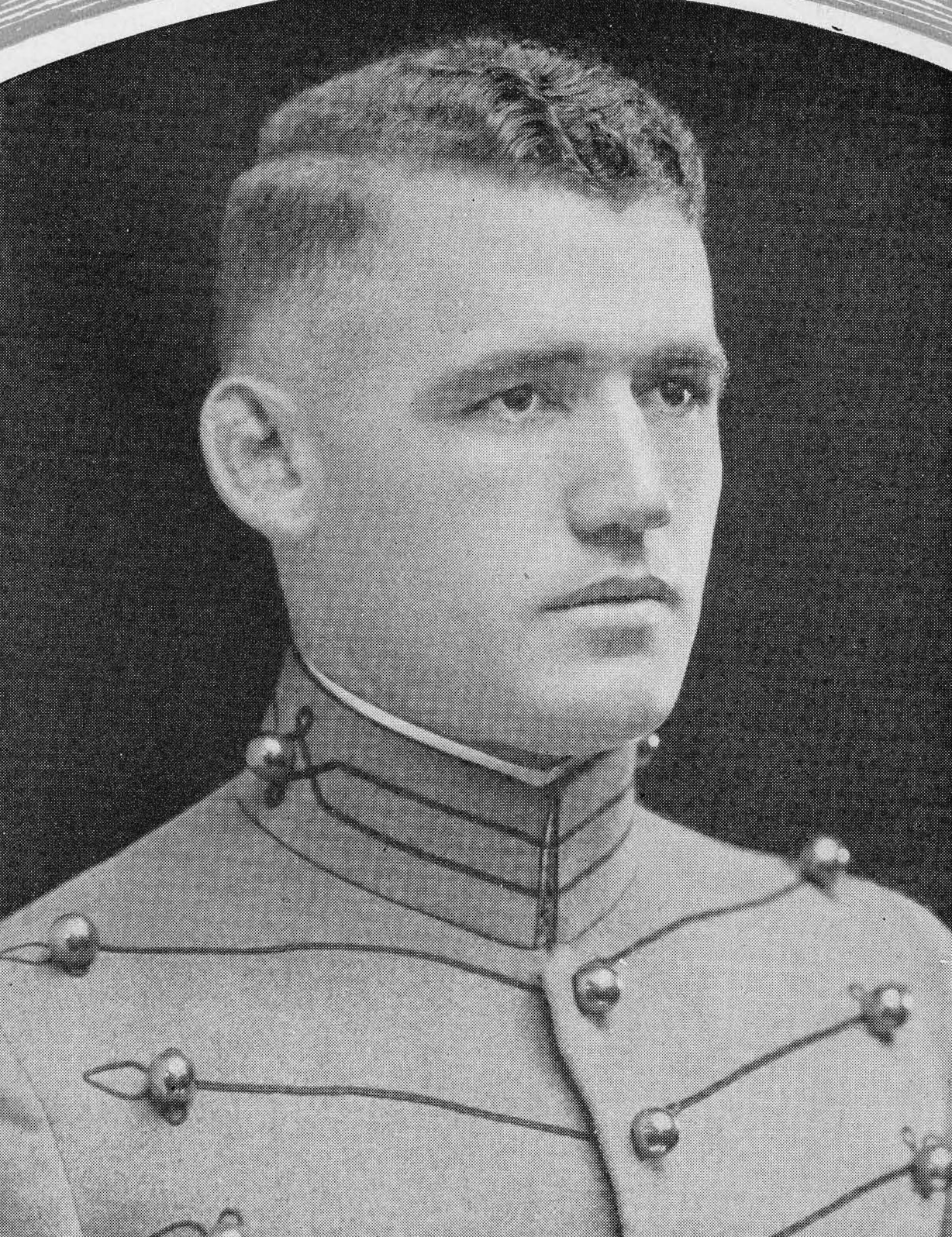
- At West Point in 1925
- Born: Welborn Barton Griffith Jr. November 19, 1901; Quanah, Texas
- Died: August 16, 1944 (aged 42); Lèves, France
- Burial place: Brittany American Cemetery and Memorial in Saint-James, Normandy, France
- Military career
- Allegiance: United States of America
- Branch: United States Army
- Rank: Colonel
- Units: Headquarters, XX Corps
- Conflicts: Battle of Chartres, World War II †
- Awards: Silver Star, Distinguished Service Cross, French Croix de Guerre, Purple Heart, Légion d'Honneur, Legion of Merit
- Memorials: Commemorative plaque at Lèves

Welborn Barton Griffith Jr. (November 19, 1901 – August 16, 1944) was an American officer who served during World War II in the United States Army. He graduated from the U.S. Military Academy at West Point in the Class of 1925.

Colonel Griffith is best remembered for being instrumental in saving France's Chartres Cathedral, one of the most important monuments of medieval civilization, during the battle of Chartres (August 16–18, 1944) in World War II.

As Operations Officer (G-3) with Headquarters, for XX Corps, Griffith and his driver searched the cathedral, and climbed to the top of its bell tower. Finding no Germans there, he was able to rescind the order to shell the monument. Eugene Schulz, an operations officer serving under Griffith, described the event as follows: "Nobody knows why he [Griffith] personally went into Chartres. He had to go through ... a few enemy lines there; he went into the Cathedral, and he checked it out—he went through the nave, he climbed the bell tower and he did not find any German snipers at all. So he immediately said to the artillery, 'Rescind that order to shell and destroy'."

Later that day, he was killed in the neighboring town of Lèves, 3.5 km north of Chartres. The people of Lèves set up a plaque on a building next to the spot where Griffith was killed.

On October 21, 1944, Griffith was awarded, posthumously, the Distinguished Service Cross. He was also awarded the Silver Star, the Purple Heart, the Legion of Merit, the French Croix de Guerre and the Légion d'Honneur.
