= Quanah Independent School District =

School district in Texas

Location
- Quanah, TX ESC Region 9 USA

District information
- Type: Public
- Grades: Pre-K through 12
- Superintendent: Jerry Baird

Students and staff
- Athletic conference: UIL Class AA
- District mascot: Indian
- Colors: Black, Gold, and White

Other information
- Website: www.qisd.net

Quanah Independent School District is a public school district based in Quanah, Texas, United States. Located in Hardeman County, a small portion of the district extends into Cottle County.

In 2009, the school district was rated "academically acceptable" by the Texas Education Agency.

== Schools ==
The District includes:

- Reagan Elementary School
- Travis Middle School
- Quanah High School
