= Bill Neal (writer) =

American defense attorney, historian and non-fiction writer

- Born: William Overton Neal IV; January 31, 1936; Quanah, Texas, U.S.
- Died: December 23, 2021 (aged 85); Abilene, Texas, U.S.
- Education: Hardin–Simmons University; University of Texas at Austin School of Law
- Occupations: Defense attorney, historian, non-fiction writer

William Overton Neal IV (January 31, 1936 – December 23, 2021) was an American defense attorney, historian and non-fiction writer. A comment editor of the Texas Law Review, he was best known for his non-fiction West Texas frontier books, published by the Texas Tech University Press.

Neal died in Abilene, Texas, on December 23, 2021, at the age of 85.

== Books ==
- Getting Away with Murder on the Texas Frontier: Notorious Killings and Celebrated Trials (2006)
- From Guns to Gavels: How Justice Grew Up in the Outlaw West (2008)
- Sex, Murder, and the Unwritten Law: Courting Judicial Mayhem, Texas Style (2009)
- Skullduggery, Secrets, and Murders: The 1894 Wells Fargo Scam That Backfired (2015)
