= Acme, Texas =

Coordinates: 34°19′00″N 99°49′26″W

Acme is a ghost town in Hardeman County, Texas, United States. It is located five miles west of the county seat, Quanah.

== History ==
A large deposit of gypsum was discovered by businessman James Sickler in 1890, who moved his Kansas operation to the area to exploit the deposit, and renamed it the Lone Star Cement Plaster Company, which began the city of Acme. During the initial mining of gypsum, a number of mastodon fossils were found.

Ten years later, Acme had a store, school, hotel, and railroad depot. The population grew to 400 residents by 1945 as the plant became the largest of its type in the United States. The plant closed in the 1960s, causing a decline in population, such that by 1975, only 14 permanent residents remained.

Beginning in the 1980s, the Georgia Pacific Corporation began manufacturing gypsum board in the town, although no permanent residents live there.

While a few of the original buildings are still standing, including the railroad depot, many were bulldozed in the late 20th century.

== See also ==
- List of ghost towns in Texas
