= Redberry juniper =

Redberry juniper is a common name for two closely related junipers and may refer to:

- Juniperus coahuilensis
- Juniperus pinchotii, native to southwestern North America
