= Hardeman County, Texas =

County in Texas, US

- County
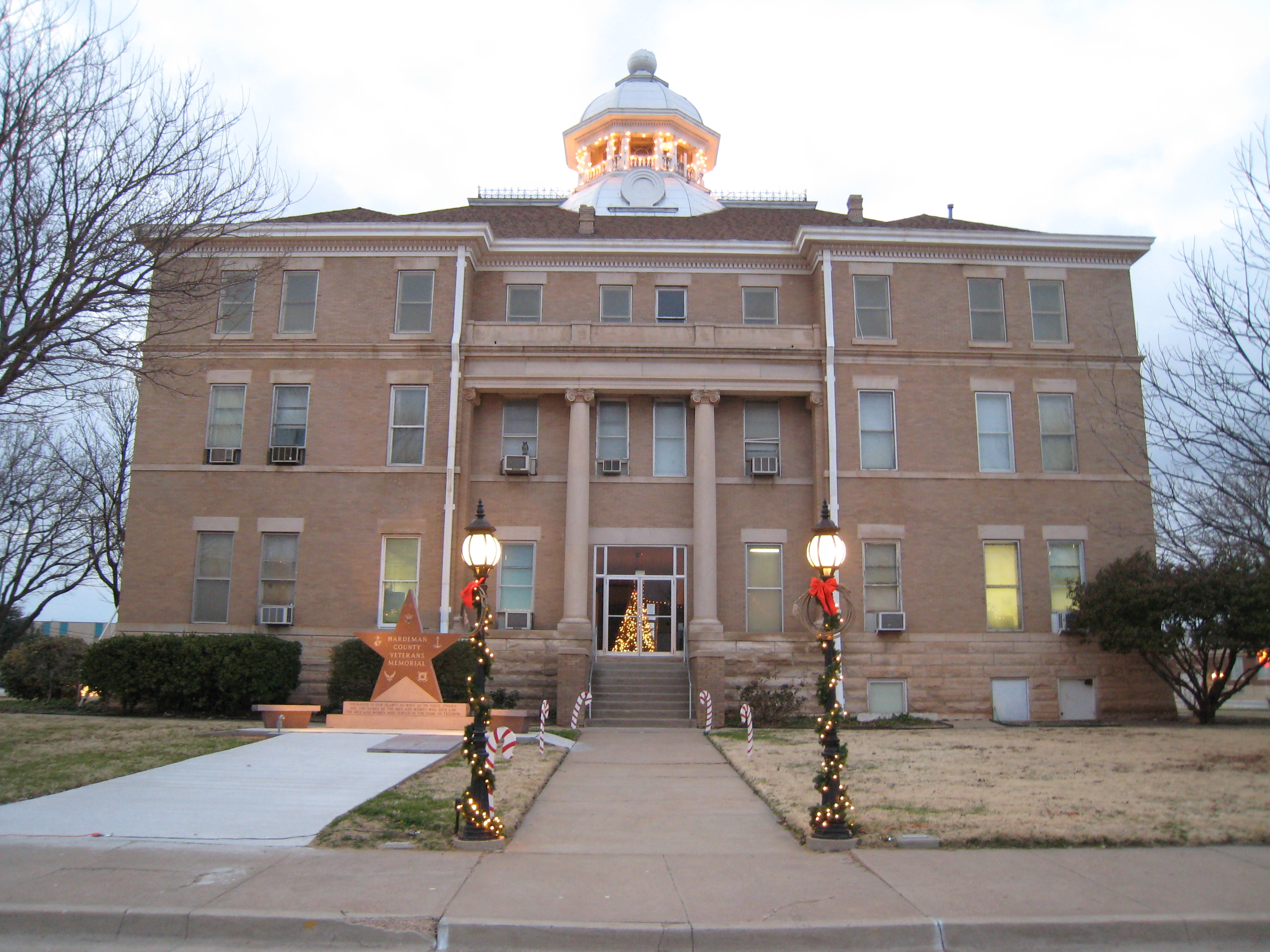
- The Hardeman County Courthouse in Quanah

- Location within the U.S. state of Texas
- Coordinates: 34°17′N 99°45′W
- Country: United States
- State: Texas
- Founded: 1884
- Seat: Quanah
- Largest city: Quanah

Area
  - Total: 697 sq mi (1,810 km^{2})
  - Land: 695 sq mi (1,800 km^{2})
  - Water: 1.8 sq mi (4.7 km^{2}) 0.3%

Population (2020)
  - Total: 3,549
  - Estimate (2025): 3,292 ▼
  - Density: 5.11/sq mi (1.97/km^{2})
- Time zone: UTC−6 (Central)
  - Summer (DST): UTC−5 (CDT)
- Congressional district: 13th
- Website: www.co.hardeman.tx.us

Hardeman County (/ˈhɑːrdɪmən/ HAR-di-mən) is a county located in the U.S. state of Texas. As of the 2020 census, its population was 3,549. The county seat and largest city is Quanah. The county was created in 1858 and later organized in 1884. It is named for two brothers, Bailey Hardeman and Thomas Jones Hardeman, early Texas politicians and legislators. Hardeman County was one of 46 prohibition or entirely dry counties in Texas until November 2006, when voters approved referendums to permit the legal sale of alcoholic beverages for on- and off-premises consumption.

== Geography ==
According to the U.S. Census Bureau, the county has a total area of 697 sq mi (1,810 km^{2}), of which 695 sq mi (1,800 km^{2}) are land and 1.8 sq mi (4.7 km^{2}) (0.3%) are covered by water.

The Prairie Dog Town Fork Red River joins with Buck Creek in the northwestern corner of the county to form the Red River, which flows east to form the northern border of the county, separating it from Oklahoma.

Hardeman County is the northernmost county in Texas that is not part of the Texas Panhandle.

=== Major highways ===
- U.S. Highway 287
- State Highway 6
- Loop 285
- Spur 133

=== Adjacent counties ===
- Harmon County, Oklahoma (north)
- Jackson County, Oklahoma (northeast)
- Wilbarger County (east)
- Foard County (south)
- Cottle County (southwest)
- Childress County (west)

== Demographics ==
Historical population
Census	Pop.	Note	%±
1880	50		—
1890	3,904		7,708.0%
1900	3,634		−6.9%
1910	11,213		208.6%
1920	12,487		11.4%
1930	14,532		16.4%
1940	11,073		−23.8%
1950	10,212		−7.8%
1960	8,275		−19.0%
1970	6,795		−17.9%
1980	6,368		−6.3%
1990	5,283		−17.0%
2000	4,724		−10.6%
2010	4,139		−12.4%
2020	3,549		−14.3%
2025 (est.)	3,292	▼	−7.2%
U.S. Decennial Census; 1850–2010 2010 2020

=== Racial and ethnic composition ===
Hardeman County, Texas – Racial and ethnic composition Note: the US Census treats Hispanic/Latino as an ethnic category. This table excludes Latinos from the racial categories and assigns them to a separate category. Hispanics/Latinos may be of any race.
Race / Ethnicity (NH = Non-Hispanic)	Pop 1980	Pop 1990	Pop 2000	Pop 2010	Pop 2020	% 1980	% 1990	% 2000	% 2010	% 2020
White alone (NH)	5,300	4,331	3,731	2,938	2,441	83.23%	81.98%	78.98%	70.98%	68.78%
Black or African American alone (NH)	520	318	227	217	130	8.17%	6.02%	4.81%	5.24%	3.66%
Native American or Alaska Native alone (NH)	28	26	27	15	14	0.44%	0.49%	0.57%	0.36%	0.39%
Asian alone (NH)	5	13	12	12	18	0.08%	0.25%	0.25%	0.29%	0.51%
Native Hawaiian or Pacific Islander alone (NH)	x	x	0	0	1	x	x	0.00%	0.00%	0.03%
Other race alone (NH)	5	6	2	1	7	0.08%	0.11%	0.04%	0.02%	0.20%
Mixed race or Multiracial (NH)	x	x	40	67	120	x	x	0.85%	1.62%	3.38%
Hispanic or Latino (any race)	510	589	685	889	818	8.01%	11.15%	14.50%	21.48%	23.05%
Total	6,368	5,283	4,724	4,139	3,549	100.00%	100.00%	100.00%	100.00%	100.00%

=== 2020 census ===
As of the 2020 census, the county had a population of 3,549. The median age was 42.9 years; 22.8% of residents were under the age of 18 and 22.9% of residents were 65 years of age or older. For every 100 females there were 99.2 males, and for every 100 females age 18 and over there were 93.5 males age 18 and over.

The racial makeup of the county was 77.4% White, 4.0% Black or African American, 0.5% American Indian and Alaska Native, 0.5% Asian, 0.2% Native Hawaiian and Pacific Islanders, 8.8% from some other race, and 8.5% from two or more races. Hispanic or Latino residents of any race comprised 23.0% of the population.

Almost none of residents lived in urban areas, while nearly 100.0% lived in rural areas.

Of the 1,509 households in the county, 30.4% had children under 18 living in them, 46.3% were married-couple households, 21.6% were households with a male householder and no spouse or partner present, and 27.0% were households with a female householder and no spouse or partner present. About 30.8% of all households were made up of individuals, and 16.5% had someone living alone who was 65 or older.

Of the 1,804 housing units, 16.4% were vacant. Among occupied housing units, 68.7% were owner-occupied and 31.3% were renter-occupied. The homeowner vacancy rate was 2.6% and the rental vacancy rate was 12.1%.

=== 2000 census ===
As of the 2000 census, 4,724 people, 1,943 households, and 1,319 families were residing in the county. The population density was 7 people/mi^{2} (2.7 people/km^{2}). The 2,358 housing units averaged 3 units per square mile (1.2/km^{2}). The racial makeup of the county was 85.4% White, 4.8% African American, 0.8% Native American, 0.3% Asian, 7.1% from other races, and 1.6% from two or more races. About 14.5% of the population were Hispanic or Latino of any race.

Of the 1,943 households, 29.9% had children under 18 living with them, 54.7% were married couples living together, 10.4% had a female householder with no husband present, and 32.1% were not families. About 29.5% of all households were made up of individuals, and 18.0% had someone living alone who was 65 or older. The average household size was 2.40, and the average family size was 2.97.

In the county, the population distribution was 25.4% under the age of 18, 7.5% from 18 to 24, 22.6% from 25 to 44, 24.3% from 45 to 64, and 20.2% who were 65 or older. The median age was 41 years. For every 100 females, there were 89.4 males. For every 100 females 18 and over, there were 85.2 males.

The median income for a household in the county was $28,312 and for a family was $33,325. Males had a median income of $26,683 versus $18,566 for females. The per capita income for the county was $16,824. About 14.6% of families and 17.8% of the population were below the poverty line, including 26.0% of those under 18 and 13.4% of those 65 or over.

== Economy ==
Georgia-Pacific operates a gypsum plant in the small community of Acme, located 6 miles (9.7 km) west of Quanah on U.S. Highway 287.

== Attractions ==
- Copper Breaks State Park, which is operated by the Texas Parks and Wildlife Department, is located in far southern Hardeman County near the Pease River just off State Highway 6, about 12 miles (19 km) south of Quanah. The park features a portion of the state Texas Longhorn herd.
- Lake Pauline is located off U.S. Highway 287, 6 miles (9.7 km) east of Quanah.

== Communities ==
=== Cities ===
- Chillicothe
- Quanah (county seat)

=== Unincorporated communities ===
- Goodlett

=== Ghost towns ===
- Acme
- Medicine Mound

== Politics ==
Republican Drew Springer, Jr., a businessman from Muenster in Cooke County, has represented Hardeman County in the Texas Senate since 2021, and previously in the Texas House of Representatives from 2013 to 2021. Hardeman County formerly leaned Democratic, but in recent years, it has swung to become solidly Republican.

Hardeman County is located within District 69 of the Texas House of Representatives. Hardeman County is located within District 28 of the Texas Senate.

United States presidential election results for Hardeman County, Texas
Year	Republican		Democratic		Third party(ies)	
Year	No.	%	No.	%	No.	%
1912	36	3.38%	843	79.15%	186	17.46%
1916	94	8.14%	932	80.69%	129	11.17%
1920	252	19.03%	967	73.04%	105	7.93%
1924	256	18.18%	1,099	78.05%	53	3.76%
1928	1,333	59.43%	910	40.57%	0	0.00%
1932	145	6.79%	1,985	92.97%	5	0.23%
1936	207	9.38%	1,991	90.17%	10	0.45%
1940	362	12.86%	2,453	87.14%	0	0.00%
1944	223	10.26%	1,756	80.81%	194	8.93%
1948	226	11.44%	1,654	83.70%	96	4.86%
1952	1,571	55.69%	1,242	44.03%	8	0.28%
1956	1,119	46.45%	1,281	53.18%	9	0.37%
1960	1,472	55.44%	1,182	44.52%	1	0.04%
1964	697	27.53%	1,835	72.47%	0	0.00%
1968	873	34.25%	1,145	44.92%	531	20.83%
1972	1,357	68.29%	614	30.90%	16	0.81%
1976	805	36.18%	1,403	63.06%	17	0.76%
1980	1,056	46.46%	1,174	51.65%	43	1.89%
1984	1,238	56.97%	927	42.66%	8	0.37%
1988	855	42.73%	1,143	57.12%	3	0.15%
1992	614	31.71%	954	49.28%	368	19.01%
1996	610	39.84%	750	48.99%	171	11.17%
2000	976	62.68%	566	36.35%	15	0.96%
2004	1,214	71.33%	480	28.20%	8	0.47%
2008	1,199	75.17%	373	23.39%	23	1.44%
2012	1,176	78.66%	302	20.20%	17	1.14%
2016	1,207	79.78%	249	16.46%	57	3.77%
2020	1,330	84.18%	241	15.25%	9	0.57%
2024	1,210	86.12%	188	13.38%	7	0.50%

United States Senate election results for Hardeman County, Texas1
Year	Republican		Democratic		Third party(ies)	
Year	No.	%	No.	%	No.	%
2024	1,163	83.19%	217	15.52%	18	1.29%

United States Senate election results for Hardeman County, Texas2
Year	Republican		Democratic		Third party(ies)	
Year	No.	%	No.	%	No.	%
2020	1,313	84.44%	232	14.92%	10	0.64%

Texas Gubernatorial election results for Hardeman County
Year	Republican		Democratic		Third party(ies)	
Year	No.	%	No.	%	No.	%
2022	866	87.92%	114	11.57%	5	0.51%

== Education ==
School districts serving sections of the county include:

- Childress Independent School District
- Chillicothe Independent School District
- Quanah Independent School District

The county is in the service area of Vernon College.

== See also ==
- List of museums in North Texas
- National Register of Historic Places listings in Hardeman County, Texas
- Recorded Texas Historic Landmarks in Hardeman County
- Hardeman County, Tennessee
