= Chillicothe Independent School District =

School district in Texas, United States

Coordinates: 34.272°N 99.501°W

Location
- Chillicothe, TX ESC Region 9 USA

District information
- Type: Public
- Grades: Pre-K through 12
- Superintendent: Tony Martinez

Students and staff
- Athletic conference: UIL Class A (six-man football participant)
- District mascot: Eagle
- Colors: Red & White

Other information
- Website: www.cisd-tx.net

Chillicothe Independent School District is a public school district based in Chillicothe, Texas, United States. The district covers eastern Hardeman and northwestern Wilbarger Counties. In addition to Chillicothe, the district also serves the unincorporated community of Odell.

== Academic achievement ==
In 2009, the school district was rated "academically acceptable" by the Texas Education Agency.

== Schools ==
- Chillicothe High/Junior High School (grades 7-12)
- Chillicothe Elementary School (prekindergarten-grade 6)

== Special programs ==
=== Athletics ===
Chillicothe High School plays six-man football, volleyball, basketball, baseball, tennis, track and field, and golf.

== See also ==
- List of school districts in Texas
