= Quanah, Texas =

Quanah
- City
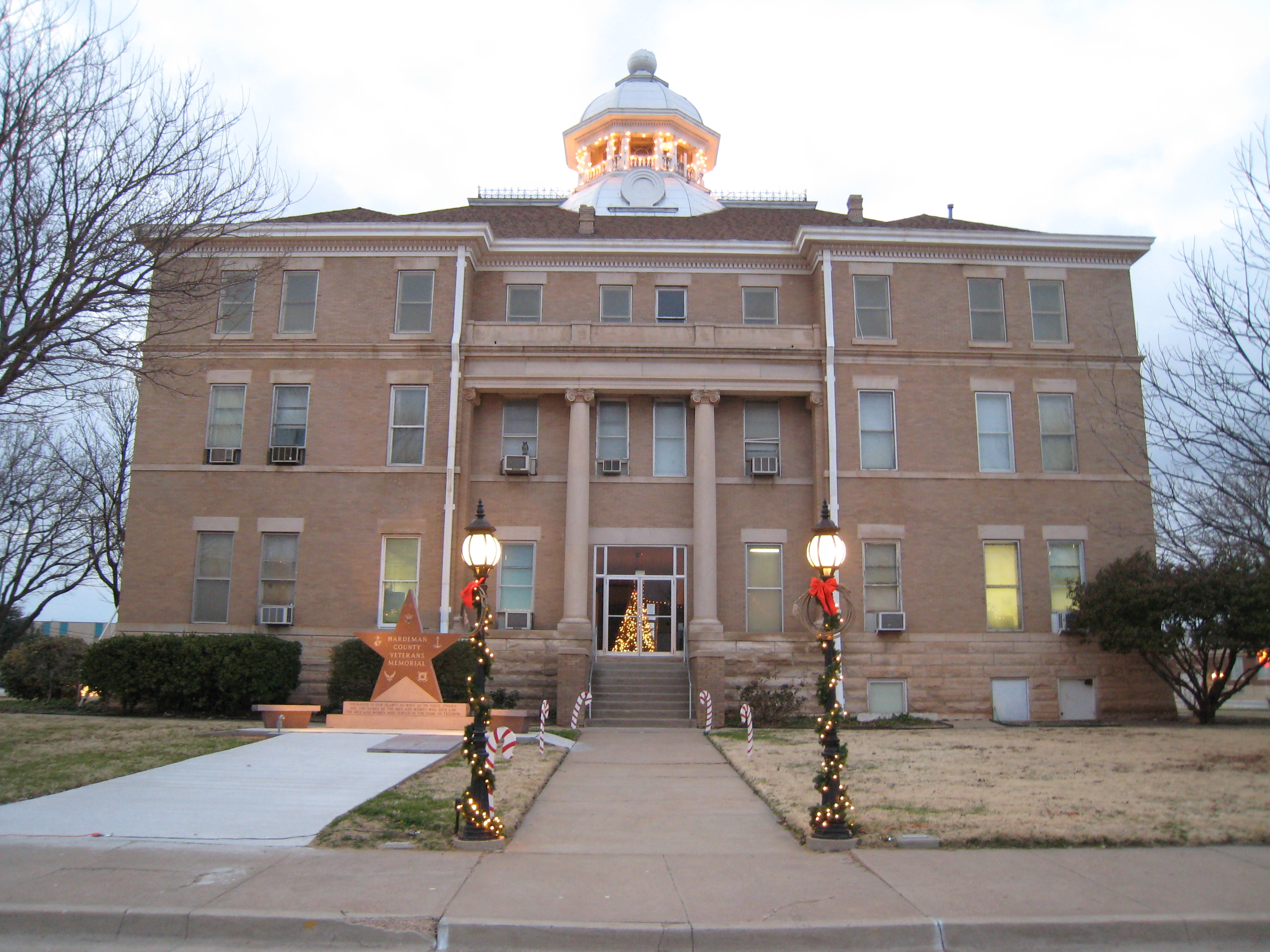
- Hardeman County Courthouse in 2006

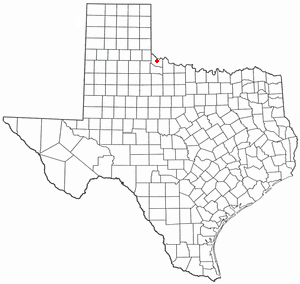
- Location of Quanah, Texas

- Coordinates: 34°17′42″N 99°44′54″W
- Country: United States
- State: Texas
- County: Hardeman
- Named for: Quanah Parker

Area
  - Total: 3.47 sq mi (9.00 km^{2})
  - Land: 3.47 sq mi (9.00 km^{2})
  - Water: 0 sq mi (0.00 km^{2})
- Elevation: 1,572 ft (479 m)

Population (2020)
  - Total: 2,279
  - Density: 656/sq mi (253/km^{2})
- Time zone: UTC-6 (Central (CST))
  - Summer (DST): UTC-5 (CDT)
- ZIP code: 79252
- Area code: 940
- FIPS code: 48-60044
- GNIS feature ID: 2411505
- Website: sites.google.com/cityofquanah.com/cityofquanah

Quanah (/ˈkwɑːnə/) is a city in and the county seat of Hardeman County, Texas, United States. As of the 2020 census, its population was 2,279, down from 2,641 at the 2010 census.

Quanah is 192 miles (309 km) northwest of Fort Worth and 8 miles (13 km) south of the Red River, which forms the Oklahoma-Texas state line. Copper Breaks State Park is 12 miles (19 km) south of the city.

== History ==
Quanah was organized in 1884 as a stop on what was then the Fort Worth and Denver City Railway. The city was named for Quanah Parker, the last principal chief of the Comanche Nation.

The county seat of Hardeman County was moved from Margaret to Quanah in 1890 after an acrimonious battle that contributed to the splitting off of the southern section of Hardeman County as Foard County.

== Geography ==
Quanah is at the geographic center of Hardeman County, at the intersection of U.S. Route 287 (11th Street) and Texas State Highway 6 (Main Street). US 287 leads southeast 30 miles (48 km) to Vernon and northwest 28 miles (45 km) to Childress. Highway 6 leads south 21 miles (34 km) to Crowell and north 8 miles (13 km) to the Oklahoma border at the Red River. Altus, Oklahoma, is 40 miles (64 km) northeast of Quanah via Oklahoma Highway 6.

According to the United States Census Bureau, Quanah has a total area of 3.5 square miles (9.0 km^{2}), all land.

=== Climate ===
Climate data for Quanah, Texas (1981–2010 normals, extremes 1893, 1904–2008)
Month	Jan	Feb	Mar	Apr	May	Jun	Jul	Aug	Sep	Oct	Nov	Dec	Year
Record high °F (°C)	89 (32)	93 (34)	102 (39)	104 (40)	111 (44)	119 (48)	114 (46)	119 (48)	110 (43)	107 (42)	95 (35)	88 (31)	119 (48)
Mean daily maximum °F (°C)	53.5 (11.9)	56.6 (13.7)	65.8 (18.8)	74.6 (23.7)	82.9 (28.3)	90.9 (32.7)	95.7 (35.4)	94.7 (34.8)	86.9 (30.5)	76.1 (24.5)	64.2 (17.9)	53.7 (12.1)	74.6 (23.7)
Daily mean °F (°C)	39.9 (4.4)	43.1 (6.2)	51.9 (11.1)	60.3 (15.7)	69.9 (21.1)	78.7 (25.9)	83.1 (28.4)	82.1 (27.8)	73.7 (23.2)	62.3 (16.8)	50.4 (10.2)	40.5 (4.7)	61.3 (16.3)
Mean daily minimum °F (°C)	26.2 (−3.2)	29.7 (−1.3)	37.9 (3.3)	46.0 (7.8)	56.9 (13.8)	66.5 (19.2)	70.6 (21.4)	69.5 (20.8)	60.5 (15.8)	48.5 (9.2)	36.5 (2.5)	27.4 (−2.6)	48.0 (8.9)
Record low °F (°C)	−9 (−23)	−8 (−22)	1 (−17)	21 (−6)	30 (−1)	42 (6)	50 (10)	50 (10)	29 (−2)	16 (−9)	5 (−15)	−15 (−26)	−15 (−26)
Average precipitation inches (mm)	1.00 (25)	1.19 (30)	1.90 (48)	2.13 (54)	3.29 (84)	3.95 (100)	2.42 (61)	2.79 (71)	2.83 (72)	2.56 (65)	1.64 (42)	1.15 (29)	26.85 (682)
Average precipitation days (≥ 0.01 in)	3.8	4.6	5.3	4.8	7.3	7.6	4.9	6.4	5.6	4.7	4.2	4.4	63.6
Source: NOAA

== Demographics ==
Historical population
Census	Pop.	Note	%±
1890	1,477		—
1900	1,651		11.8%
1910	3,127		89.4%
1920	3,691		18.0%
1930	4,464		20.9%
1940	3,767		−15.6%
1950	4,589		21.8%
1960	4,564		−0.5%
1970	3,948		−13.5%
1980	3,890		−1.5%
1990	3,413		−12.3%
2000	3,022		−11.5%
2010	2,641		−12.6%
2020	2,279		−13.7%
U.S. Decennial Census

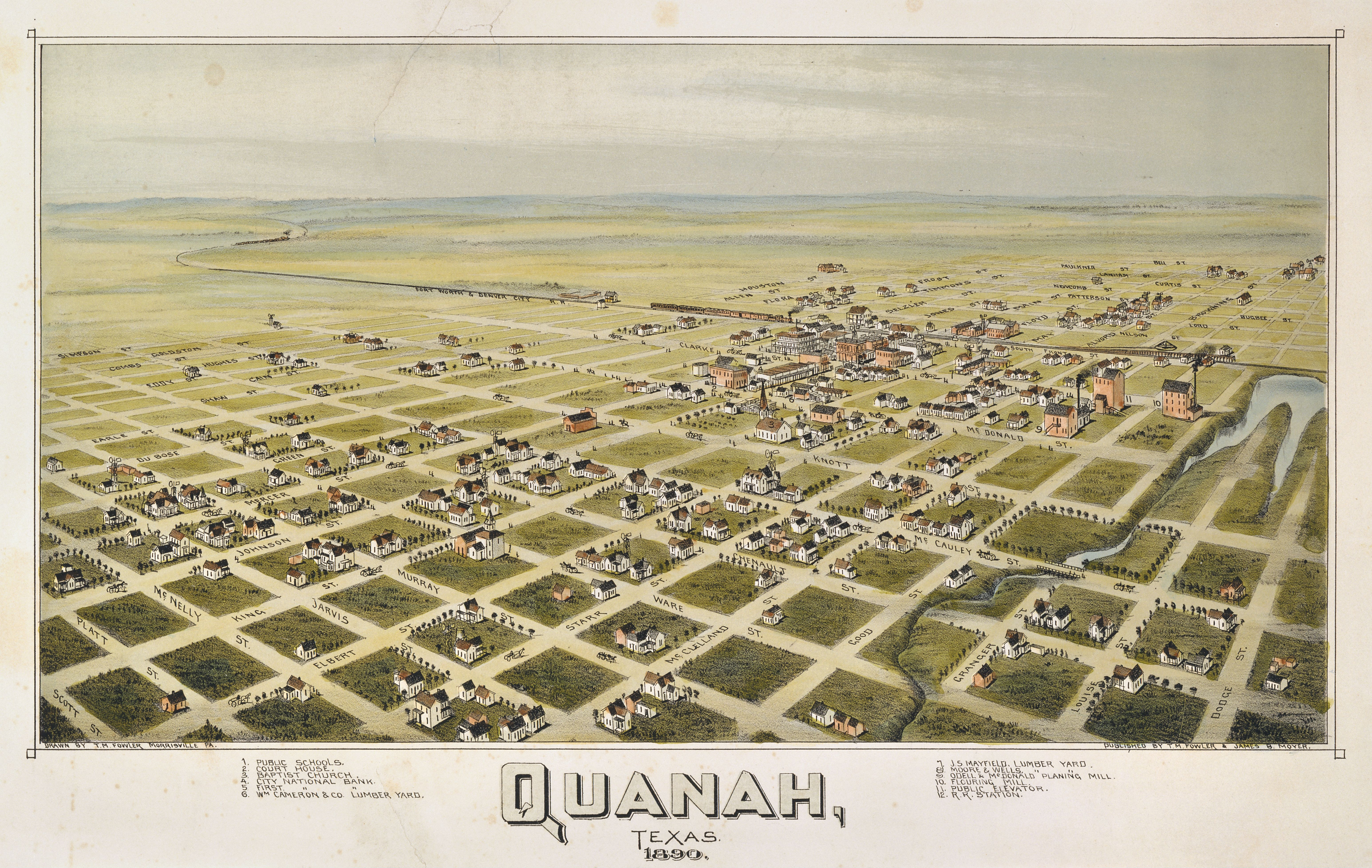
Map of Quanah from 1890

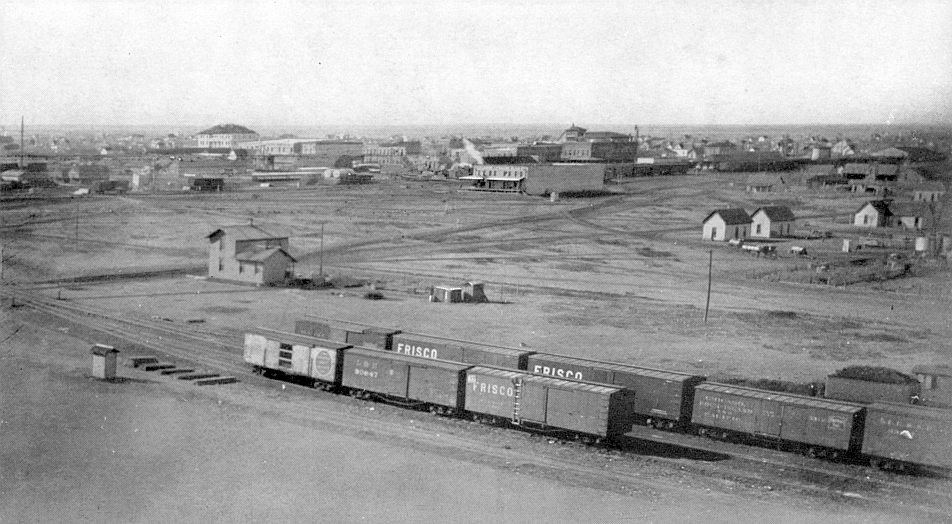
Quanah (c. 1920–1932)

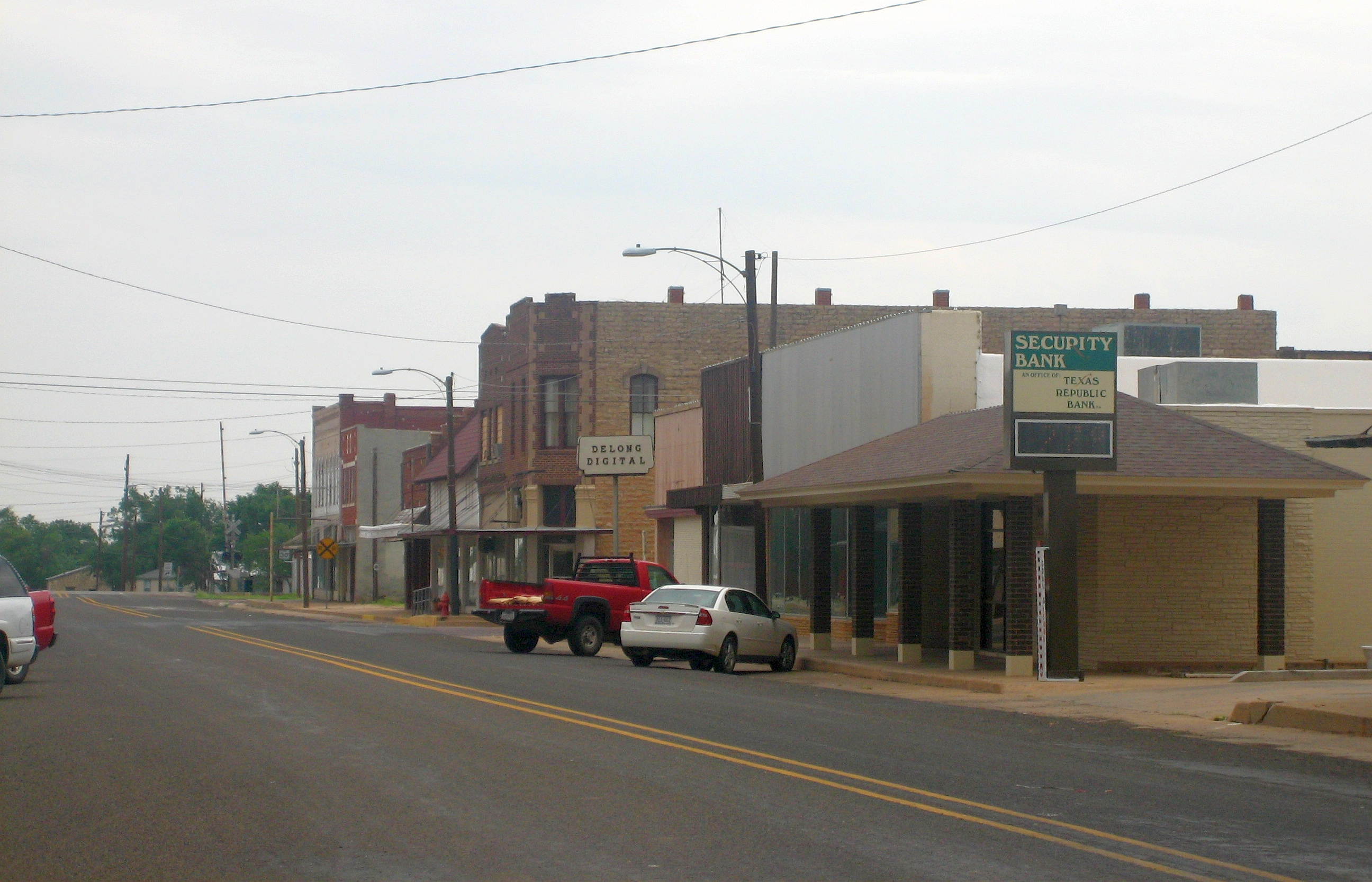
Quanah's commercial district is listed on the National Register of Historic Places.

=== 2020 census ===
As of the 2020 census, Quanah had a population of 2,279. The median age was 42.0 years; 22.8% of residents were under 18 and 22.2% were 65 or older. For every 100 females, there were 92.5 males, and for every 100 females 18 and over, there were 86.6 males 18 and over.

None of residents lived in urban areas, while 100.0% lived in rural areas.

Of the 971 households in Quanah, 30.3% had children under 18 living in them, 41.4% were married-couple households, 21.4% were households with a male householder and no spouse or partner present, and 31.8% were households with a female householder and no spouse or partner present. About 33.2% of all households were made up of individuals, and 17.7% had someone living alone who was 65 or older.

Of the 1,184 housing units, 18.0% were vacant. The homeowner vacancy rate was 3.0% and the rental vacancy rate was 12.9%.

Racial composition as of the 2020 census
Race	Number	Percent
White	1,750	76.8%
Black or African American	114	5.0%
American Indian and Alaska Native	12	0.5%
Asian	18	0.8%
Native Hawaiian and other Pacific Islander	4	0.2%
Some other race	169	7.4%
Two or more races	212	9.3%
Hispanic or Latino (of any race)	532	23.3%

=== 2010 census ===
As of the 2010 census, 2,642 people lived there, a decline of 390 from the 2000 census.

=== 2000 census ===
As of the 2000 census, 3,022 people, 1,255 households, and 823 families resided in the city. The population density was 866.8 inhabitants per square mile (334.7/km^{2}). The 1,485 housing units had an average density of 425.9 per square mile (164.4/km^{2}). The racial makeup of the city was 84.1% White, 5.0% African American, 0.4% Native American, 0.4% Asian, 8.2% from other races, and 1.9% from two or more races. Hispanics or Latinos of any race were 16.5% of the population.

Of the 1,255 households, 29.2% had children under 18 living with them, 51.8% were married couples living together, 10.4% had a female householder with no husband present, and 34.4% were not families. About 31.9% of all households were made up of individuals, and 20.2% had someone living alone who was 65 or older. The average household size was 2.35 and the average family size was 2.96.

In the city, the age distribution was 25.1% under 18, 7.9% from 18 to 24, 22.0% from 25 to 44, 22.9% from 45 to 64, and 22.0% who were 65 or older. The median age was 42 years. For every 100 females, there were 87.6 males. For every 100 females 18 and over, there were 83.2 males.

The median income for a household in the city was $26,354 and for a family was $29,506. Males had a median income of $26,472 versus $18,403 for females. The per capita income for the city was $16,841. About 16.6% of families and 20.7% of the population were below the poverty line, including 29.8% of those under 18 and 16.4% of those 65 or over.

== Government ==
Republican Drew Springer, Jr., a businessman from Muenster in Cooke County, has represented Quanah in the Texas House of Representatives since January 2013.

== Education ==
The city is served by the Quanah Independent School District and is home to the Quanah High School Indians.

== Infrastructure ==
=== Health care ===
Quanah is home to a branch of the Helen J. Farabee Counseling Centers.

== Notable people ==
- Judy Buenoano, serial killer executed in Florida's electric chair
- Bill Evans, awarded a Bronze Star and Silver Star for valor in World War II, professional baseball player in late 1940s and 1950s
- John Gilliland, radio broadcaster
- Edward Givens, astronaut
- Welborn Griffith, American officer who served during World War II and who was instrumental in saving France's Chartres Cathedral during the battle of Chartres
- Fred C. Koch, chemical engineer and founder of Koch Industries
- Bill Neal, non-fiction writer
- Juli Reding, actress
- Clay Reynolds, author and essayist
- David Gray Ross, Maryland House of Delegates and judge with the Prince George's County Circuit Court
