= KCTX =

KCTX may refer to:

- KCTX (AM), a radio station (1510 AM) licensed to Childress, Texas, United States
- KCTX-FM, a radio station (96.1 FM) licensed to Childress, Texas, United States
