= KCHT =

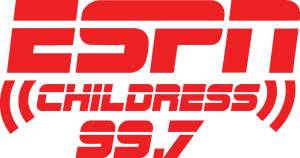
- Childress, Texas; United States
- Broadcast area: Childress County, Texas
- Frequency: 99.7 MHz
- Branding: ESPN 99.7 Childress

Programming
- Format: Sports
- Affiliations: ESPN Radio

Ownership
- Owner: Paradise Broadcasting; (James G. Boles, Jr.)
- Sister stations: KCTX, KCTX-FM, KOJL, KQTX

History
- First air date: March 13, 2012
- Call sign meaning: Childress, Texas

Technical information
- Licensing authority: FCC
- Facility ID: 170985
- Class: C3
- ERP: 4,000 watts
- HAAT: 164 meters (538 ft)
- Transmitter coordinates: 34°26′20.20″N 100°13′11.40″W

Links
- Public license information: Public file; LMS
- Website: paradisebroadcasting.com/espn-99-7

KCHT (99.7 FM) is a sports formatted broadcast radio station. The station is licensed to Childress, Texas and serves Childress and Childress County in Texas. KCHT is owned by Paradise Broadcasting and operated by James G. Boles Jr., their licensee.
