= KOLJ =

KOLJ may refer to:

- KOLJ (AM), a radio station (1150 AM) licensed to serve Quanah, Texas, United States
- KOLJ-FM, a radio station (91.1 FM) licensed to serve Wannaska, Minnesota, United States
