= Childress Independent School District =

School district

Address
- 308 3rd St NW Childress, Texas, 79201-4542; United States

District information
- Type: Public
- Grades: PK–12
- Superintendent: Mark Dykes
- Governing agency: Texas Education Agency
- Schools: 3
- NCES District ID: 4813860

Students and staff
- Enrollment: 1,005 (2022–2023)
- Teachers: 87.44 (on an FTE basis)
- Student–teacher ratio: 11.49

Other information
- Website: www.childressisd.net

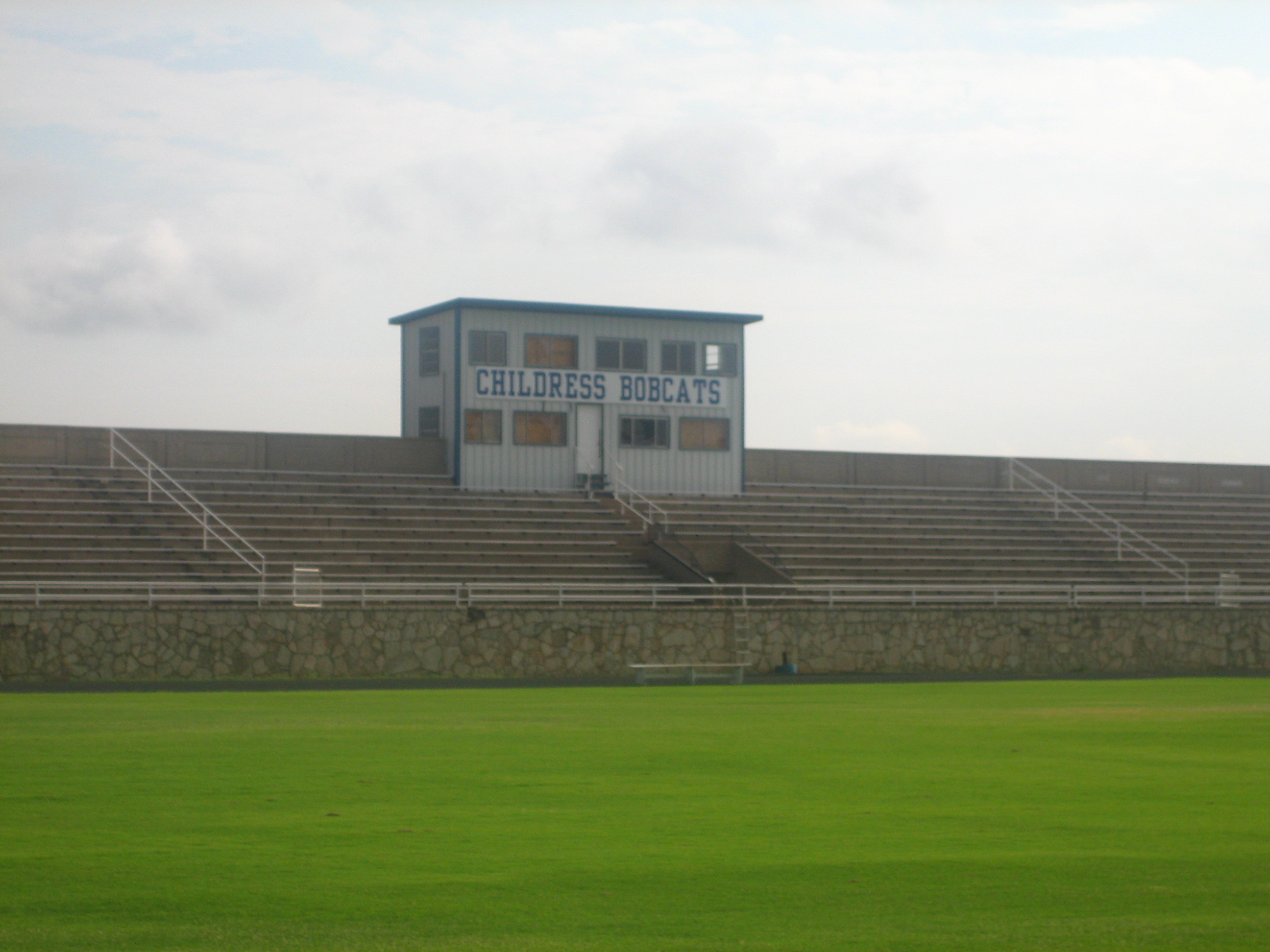
Childress Bobcats stadium

Childress Independent School District is a public school district based in Childress, Texas, United States. Located in Childress County, small portions of the district extend into Cottle, Hall, and Hardeman Counties. The current learning system for Childress is CSCOPE. Childress also participates in University Interscholastic League activities.

In 2009, the school district was rated "recognized" by the Texas Education Agency.

On July 1, 1985, the Estelline Independent School District merged into Childress ISD.

== Schools ==
- Childress High School (grades 9–12)
- Childress Junior High School (grades 6–8)
- Childress Elementary School (prekindergarten-grade 5)
