= Childress High School =

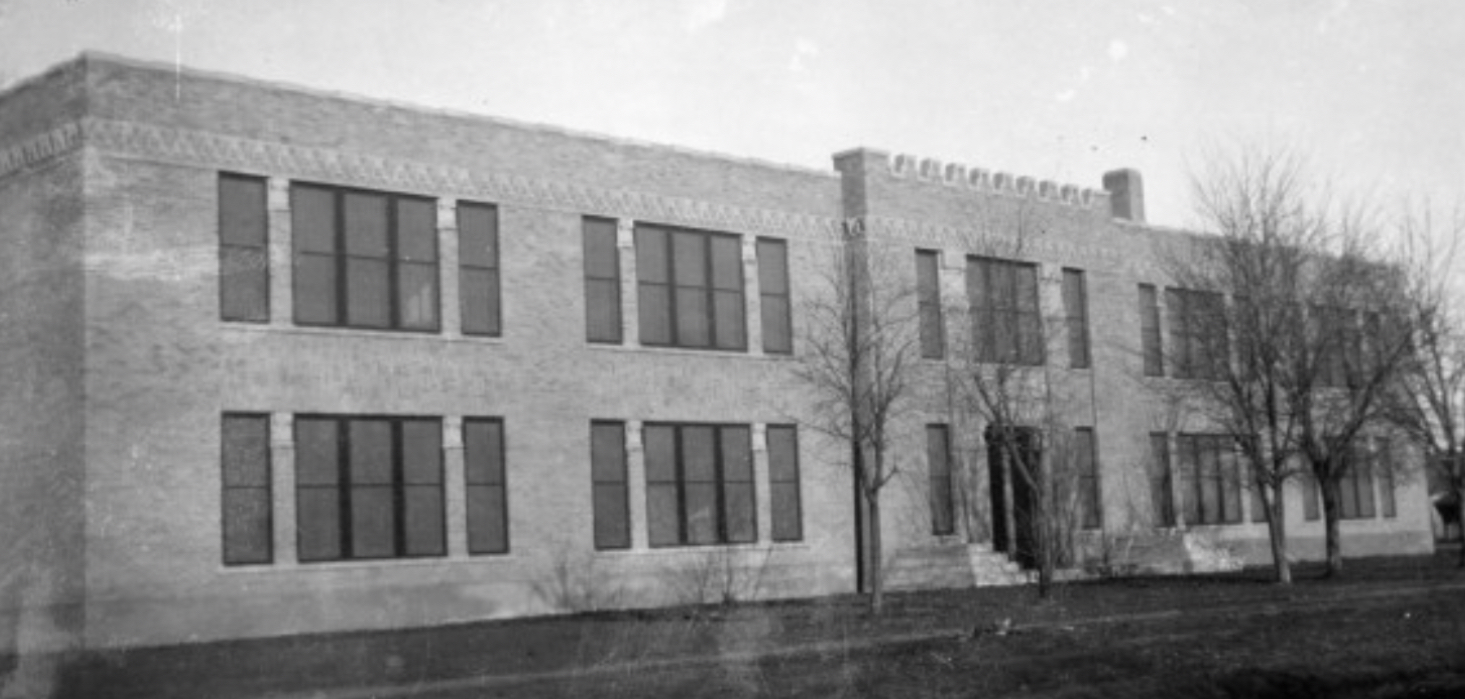
- Childress High School in January 1927

Location
- 800 Avenue J NW; Childress, Texas 79201-2830; United States; 34.4339°N 100.2099°W

Information
- School type: Public high school
- School district: Childress Independent School District
- Principal: Keely Hackler
- Teaching staff: 31.90 (on an FTE basis)
- Grades: 9-12
- Enrollment: 318 (2023-2024)
- Student to teacher ratio: 9.97
- Colors: Royal Blue & White
- Athletics conference: UIL Class 3A
- Mascot: Bobcats/Lady Cats
- Website: Childress High School

Childress High School is a public high school located in Childress, Texas that classified as a 3A school by the UIL. It is part of the Childress Independent School District located in central Childress County. The school was designed by Guy Anton Carlander. For the 2021–2022 school year, the school was given a "B" by the Texas Education Agency.
