= T.L. Roach Jr. Unit =

Prison in Texas, United States

Coordinates: 34°25′48″N 100°16′31″W

- Interactive map of T.L. Roach Jr. Unit
- Location: 15845 FM 164 Childress, Texas
- Status: open
- Security class: G1, G2, G4
- Capacity: 1884
- Opened: August 1991
- Managed by: Texas Department of Criminal Justice

The T.L. Roach Jr. Unit is a state prison for men located in Childress, Childress County, Texas, owned and operated by the Texas Department of Criminal Justice. This facility was opened in August 1991, and a maximum capacity of 1884 male inmates held at various security levels.
