= KCTX-FM =

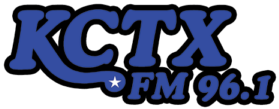
- Childress, Texas; United States
- Broadcast area: Quanah, Texas; Hollis, Oklahoma
- Frequency: 96.1 MHz
- Branding: FM 96.1

Programming
- Format: Country

Ownership
- Owner: James G. Boles, Jr.; (Paradise Broadcasting)
- Sister stations: KCHT, KCTX, KOLJ, KQTX

History
- Former call signs: KQAI (1984–1986); KSRW (1986–2001)
- Call sign meaning: Childress, Texas

Technical information
- Licensing authority: FCC
- Facility ID: 18567
- Class: C2
- ERP: 50 kilowatts
- HAAT: 145 meters (476 ft)
- Transmitter coordinates: 34°26′20″N 100°13′10″W

Links
- Public license information: Public file; LMS
- Website: http://www.kctxradio.net

KCTX-FM (96.1 FM) is a radio station broadcasting a Country music format. Licensed to Childress, Texas, United States, the station is currently owned by James G. Boles, Jr. It is licensed to broadcast at a frequency of 96.1 MHz.

== History ==
The station was assigned the call letters KQAI on April 5, 1984. On September 29, 1986, the station changed its call sign to KSRW, and on February 23, 2001, to the current KCTX.
