= KCTX (AM) =

- Childress, Texas; United States
- Broadcast area: Wellington, Texas; Memphis, Texas
- Frequency: 1510 kHz
- Branding: The Cat 92.1 FM & AM 1510

Programming
- Language: English
- Format: Hot adult contemporary
- Affiliations: TSN Radio; Compass Media Networks; Premiere Networks

Ownership
- Owner: James G. Boles, Jr.
- Sister stations: KCTX-FM; KCHT; KOLJ; KQTX

History
- First air date: May 8, 1947
- Call sign meaning: Childress, Texas

Technical information
- Licensing authority: FCC
- Facility ID: 25186
- Class: D
- Power: 250 watts (daytime only)
- Transmitter coordinates: 34°25′28″N 100°13′48″W
- Translator: 92.1 K221FL (Childress)

Links
- Public license information: Public file; LMS
- Website: paradisebroadcasting.com/92-1-the-cat/

KCTX (1510 kHz, "The Cat") is an AM radio station broadcasting a hot adult contemporary radio format. Licensed to Childress, Texas, United States. The station is currently owned by James G. Boles, Jr. and features programming from TSN Radio and locally originated programming.

KCTX programming is also heard on translator K221FL at 92.1 FM, also licensed to Childress, hence the former station name of "K92". The station is now imaged as "The Cat" despite still airing "K92" jingles.

1510 AM is a United States clear-channel frequency; WLAC in Nashville, Tennessee is the dominant Class A station on this frequency. KCTX must leave the air from sunset to sunrise in order to protect the nighttime skywave signal of WLAC. The site has left the old location and a brand new antenna is carrying the station. This has been registered with the FCC as a CP.
