= Childress, Texas =

City in and county seat of Childress County, Texas, United States

- City
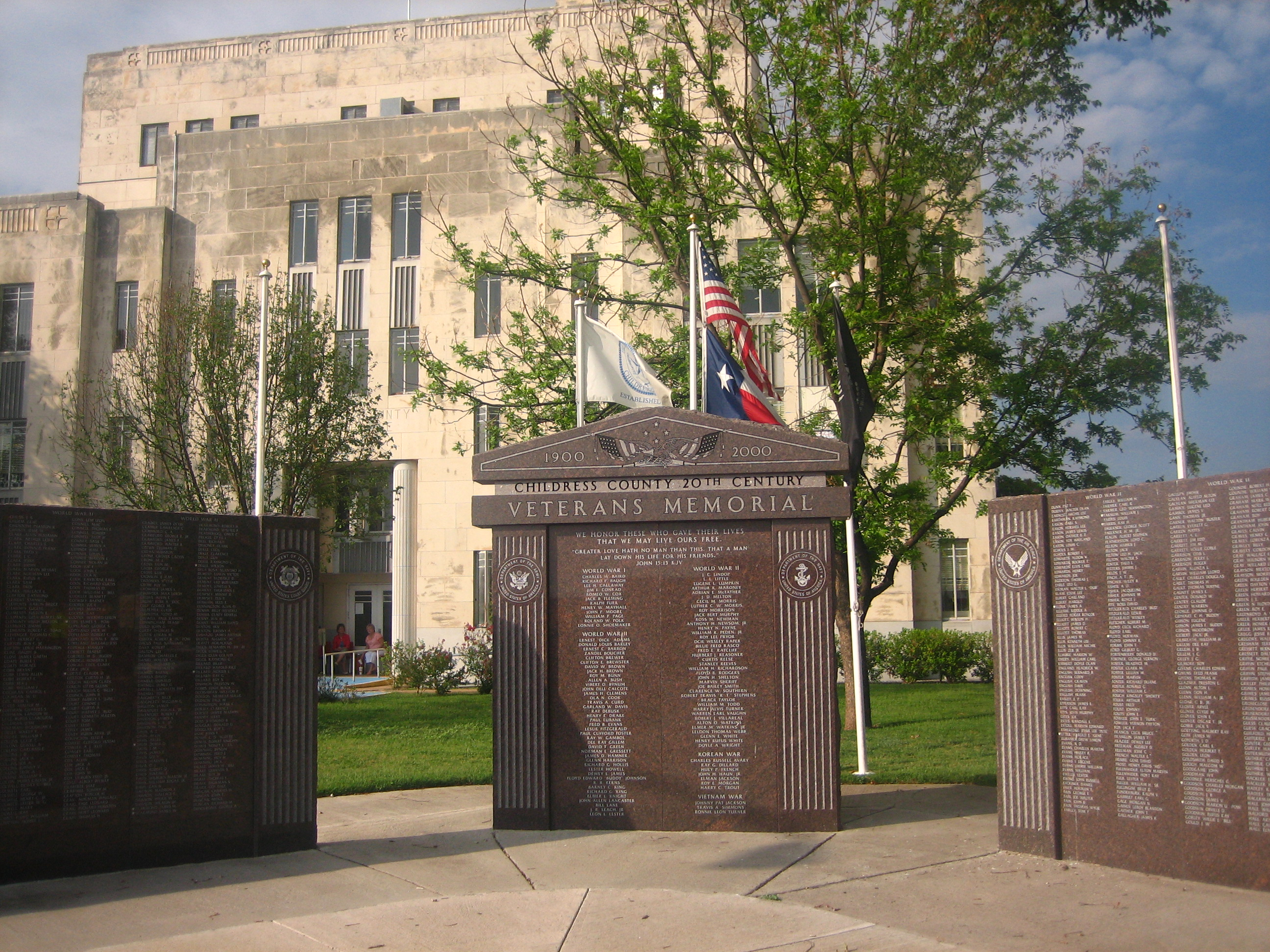
- Veterans Memorial at the Childress County Courthouse (built 1939)
- Motto: Gateway to the Panhandle
- Location of Childress, Texas
- Coordinates: 34°25′41″N 100°12′54″W
- Country: United States
- State: Texas
- County: Childress
- Incorporated: 1890

Government
  - Mayor: Cary Preston

Area
  - Total: 8.31 sq mi (21.53 km^{2})
  - Land: 8.26 sq mi (21.39 km^{2})
  - Water: 0.054 sq mi (0.14 km^{2})
- Elevation: 1,949 ft (594 m)

Population (2020)
  - Total: 5,737
  - Density: 732.2/sq mi (282.71/km^{2})
- Time zone: UTC−6 (Central (CST))
  - Summer (DST): UTC−5 (CDT)
- ZIP code: 79201
- Area code: 940
- FIPS code: 48-14668
- GNIS feature ID: 2409449
- Website: www.cityofchildress.com

Childress (/ˈtʃɪldrɪs/ CHIL-driss) (established 1887; incorporated 1890) is a city in and the county seat of Childress County, Texas, United States. Its population was 5,737 at the 2020 census.

The city and county were named after George Campbell Childress, a native of Nashville, Tennessee, who was the principal author of the Texas Declaration of Independence. The county and city were incorporated more than four decades after Childress' death.

== Demographics ==
=== 2020 census ===
As of the 2020 census, Childress had a population of 5,737 and 1,316 families residing in the city. The median age was 34.0 years. 19.9% of residents were under the age of 18 and 15.2% of residents were 65 years of age or older. For every 100 females there were 141.7 males, and for every 100 females age 18 and over there were 151.8 males age 18 and over.

78.7% of residents lived in urban areas, while 21.3% lived in rural areas.

There were 1,893 households in Childress, of which 30.5% had children under the age of 18 living in them. Of all households, 43.2% were married-couple households, 18.4% were households with a male householder and no spouse or partner present, and 31.9% were households with a female householder and no spouse or partner present. About 31.0% of all households were made up of individuals and 15.8% had someone living alone who was 65 years of age or older.

There were 2,324 housing units, of which 18.5% were vacant. Among occupied housing units, 65.2% were owner-occupied and 34.8% were renter-occupied. The homeowner vacancy rate was 3.0% and the rental vacancy rate was 16.2%.

Racial composition as of the 2020 census
Race	Percent
White	62.5%
Black or African American	9.9%
American Indian and Alaska Native	0.5%
Asian	0.9%
Native Hawaiian and Other Pacific Islander	<0.1%
Some other race	16.5%
Two or more races	9.6%
Hispanic or Latino (of any race)	33.0%

=== 2000 census ===
Historical population
Census	Pop.	Note	%±
1900	692		—
1910	3,818		451.7%
1920	5,003		31.0%
1930	7,163		43.2%
1940	6,464		−9.8%
1950	7,619		17.9%
1960	6,399		−16.0%
1970	5,408		−15.5%
1980	5,817		7.6%
1990	5,055		−13.1%
2000	6,778		34.1%
2010	6,105		−9.9%
2020	5,737		−6.0%
U.S. Decennial Census

As of the census of 2000, 6,778 people, 2,116 households, and 1,369 families wereresiding in the city. The population density was 821.8 inhabitants per square mile (317.3/km^{2}). The 2,554 housing units had an average density of 309.7 per square mile (119.6/km^{2}). The racial makeup of the city was 64.52% White, 15.65% African American, 0.34% Native American, 0.34% Asian, 0.06% Pacific Islander, 17.13% from other races, and 1.96% from two or more races. Hispanics or Latinos of any race were 22.37% of the population.

Of the 2,116 households, 31.3% had children under 18 living with them, 48.9% were married couples living together, 12.6% had a female householder with no husband present, and 35.3% were not families. About 32.8% of all households were made up of individuals, and 18.0% had someone living alone who was 65 or older. The average household size was 2.37, and the average family size was 3.01.

In the city, the age distribution was 21.7% under 18, 13.1% from 18 to 24, 31.3% from 25 to 44, 18.3% from 45 to 64, and 15.6% who were 65 or older. The median age was 36 years. For every 100 females, there were 147.7 males. For every 100 females 18 and over, there were 157.6 males.

The median income for a household in the city was $26,536, and for a family was $33,323. Males had a median income of $25,365 versus $19,442 for females. The per capita income for the city was $11,708. About 14.6% of families and 18.6% of the population were below the poverty line, including 29.5% of those under age 18 and 10.2% of those age 65 or over.

== Geography ==
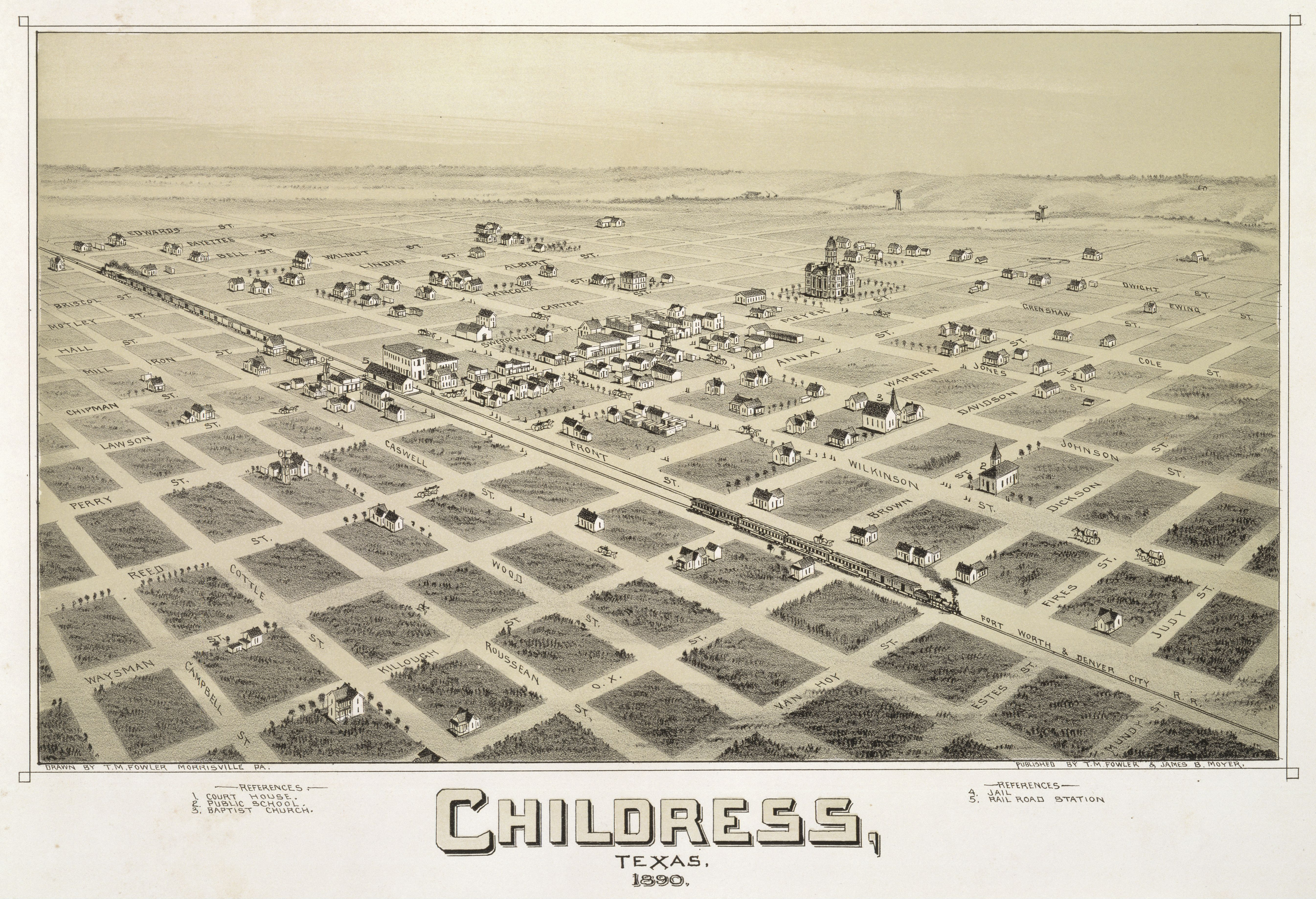
Map of the city in 1890

According to the United States Census Bureau, the city has a total area of 8.3 square miles (21 km^{2}), of which 0.04 square miles (0.10 km^{2}) is covered by water.

Childress is bordered on the west by Hall County, on the southeast by Hardeman County, on the northeast by Harmon County, Oklahoma, on the north by Collingsworth County, and on the south by Cottle County.

=== Climate ===
According to the Köppen Climate Classification system, Childress has a humid subtropical climate, abbreviated "Cfa" on climate maps. The hottest temperature recorded in Childress was 117 °F (47.2 °C) on June 27, 1994 and June 26, 2011, while the coldest temperature recorded was −13 °F (−25.0 °C) on January 17, 1930.

Climate data for Childress, Texas, 1991–2020 normals, extremes 1893–present
Month	Jan	Feb	Mar	Apr	May	Jun	Jul	Aug	Sep	Oct	Nov	Dec	Year
Record high °F (°C)	87 (31)	95 (35)	100 (38)	106 (41)	111 (44)	117 (47)	114 (46)	115 (46)	108 (42)	103 (39)	94 (34)	88 (31)	117 (47)
Mean maximum °F (°C)	78.2 (25.7)	82.3 (27.9)	89.9 (32.2)	95.7 (35.4)	99.5 (37.5)	103.0 (39.4)	104.9 (40.5)	103.4 (39.7)	98.1 (36.7)	93.3 (34.1)	83.9 (28.8)	77.5 (25.3)	107.0 (41.7)
Mean daily maximum °F (°C)	54.4 (12.4)	57.6 (14.2)	67.0 (19.4)	75.6 (24.2)	83.6 (28.7)	91.7 (33.2)	96.0 (35.6)	95.1 (35.1)	87.3 (30.7)	76.6 (24.8)	64.4 (18.0)	54.8 (12.7)	75.3 (24.1)
Daily mean °F (°C)	40.8 (4.9)	43.8 (6.6)	52.5 (11.4)	61.0 (16.1)	70.2 (21.2)	78.8 (26.0)	83.3 (28.5)	82.2 (27.9)	74.4 (23.6)	62.7 (17.1)	51.0 (10.6)	41.9 (5.5)	61.9 (16.6)
Mean daily minimum °F (°C)	27.2 (−2.7)	30.1 (−1.1)	38.0 (3.3)	46.4 (8.0)	56.8 (13.8)	65.9 (18.8)	70.5 (21.4)	69.2 (20.7)	61.4 (16.3)	48.8 (9.3)	37.6 (3.1)	29.0 (−1.7)	48.4 (9.1)
Mean minimum °F (°C)	14.7 (−9.6)	17.6 (−8.0)	23.4 (−4.8)	32.9 (0.5)	44.4 (6.9)	58.4 (14.7)	64.0 (17.8)	61.8 (16.6)	48.8 (9.3)	33.4 (0.8)	22.0 (−5.6)	15.7 (−9.1)	9.8 (−12.3)
Record low °F (°C)	−13 (−25)	−10 (−23)	2 (−17)	22 (−6)	27 (−3)	44 (7)	53 (12)	52 (11)	34 (1)	19 (−7)	6 (−14)	−5 (−21)	−13 (−25)
Average precipitation inches (mm)	0.84 (21)	1.03 (26)	1.52 (39)	2.72 (69)	3.91 (99)	4.04 (103)	2.32 (59)	2.92 (74)	2.49 (63)	1.93 (49)	1.40 (36)	0.98 (25)	26.10 (663)
Average snowfall inches (cm)	0.4 (1.0)	1.6 (4.1)	0.4 (1.0)	0.1 (0.25)	0.0 (0.0)	0.0 (0.0)	0.0 (0.0)	0.0 (0.0)	0.0 (0.0)	0.1 (0.25)	0.7 (1.8)	1.3 (3.3)	4.6 (11.7)
Average precipitation days (≥ 0.01 in)	3.4	4.8	5.5	5.6	7.9	7.0	5.8	7.0	6.0	5.8	3.9	4.1	66.8
Average snowy days (≥ 0.1 in)	0.5	0.9	0.2	0.1	0.0	0.0	0.0	0.0	0.0	0.1	0.4	1.0	3.2
Source 1: NOAA
Source 2: National Weather Service

== Government and politics ==
The Texas Department of Criminal Justice (TDCJ) operates the Childress Distribution Center and the Roach prison in Childress.

In December 2015, the Seattle Post-Intelligencer voted Childress ninth among the 10 "most conservative" cities in the United States in regard to political contributions.

== Education ==
Childress is served by the Childress Independent School District, which operates an elementary school (prekindergarten to grade 5), Childress Elementary School, middle school (grades 6 to 8), Childress Junior High School, and a high school (grades 9 to 12), Childress High School.

Clarendon College, a two-year community college, has a campus in Childress.

== Media ==
=== Radio ===
- K221FL
- K237EE
- KCTX-AM
- KCTX-FM

=== Newspaper ===
- The Red River Sun, formerly The Childress Index

== Notable people ==
- Hardy Brown, athlete
- Walter Chrysler, auto company founder, lived in Childress 1905-1906.
- Lou Dobbs, radio and television host
- Margaret A. Edwards, educator and librarian
- Roy Furr, chain restaurant founder, lived in Childress County as a youth
- Ruby Gilbert, Kansas politician
- James "T" Jones, athlete
- Bubba McDaniel, mixed martial artist
- Minnie Lou Bradley, rancher

== Gallery ==
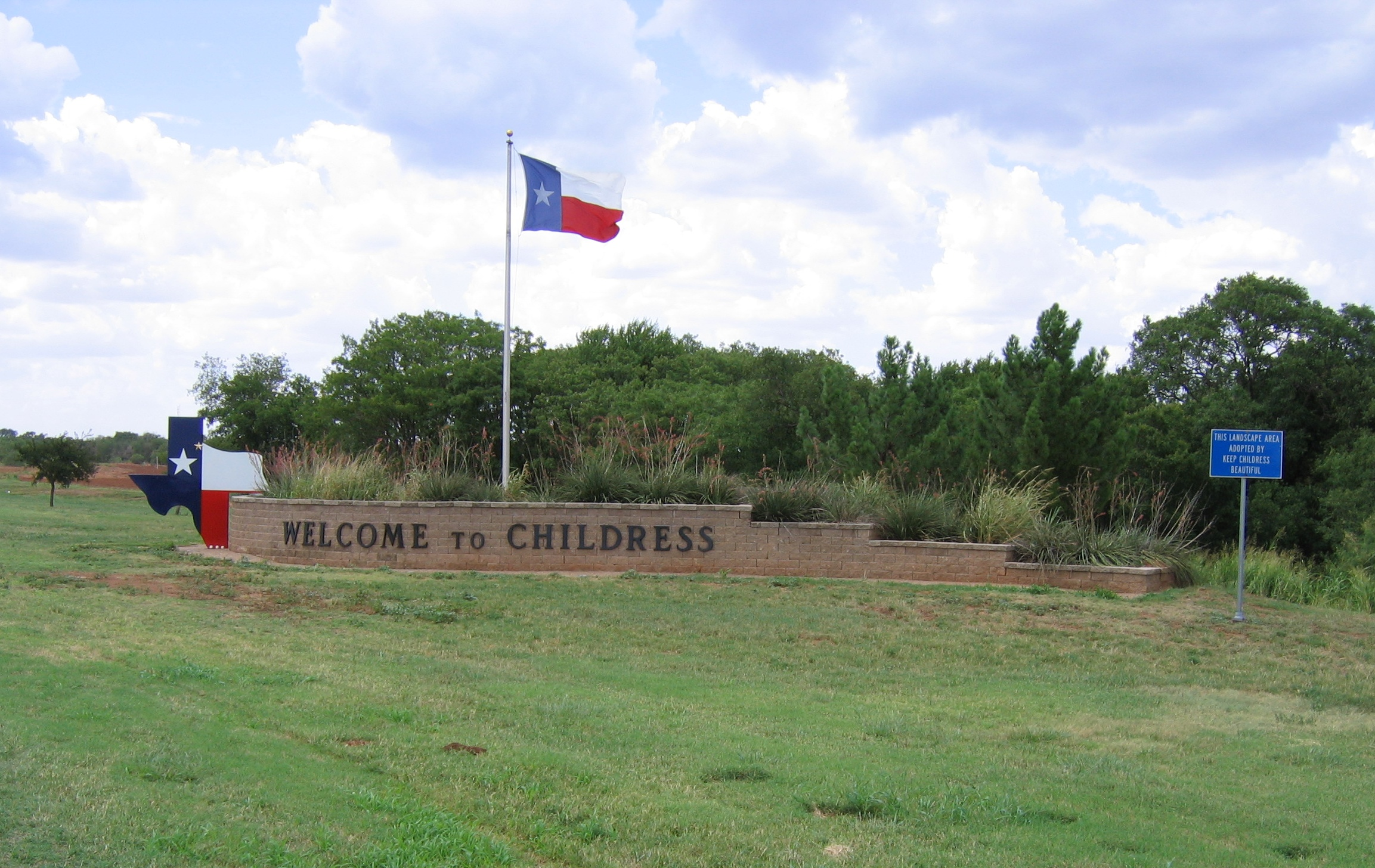
Childress welcoming sign

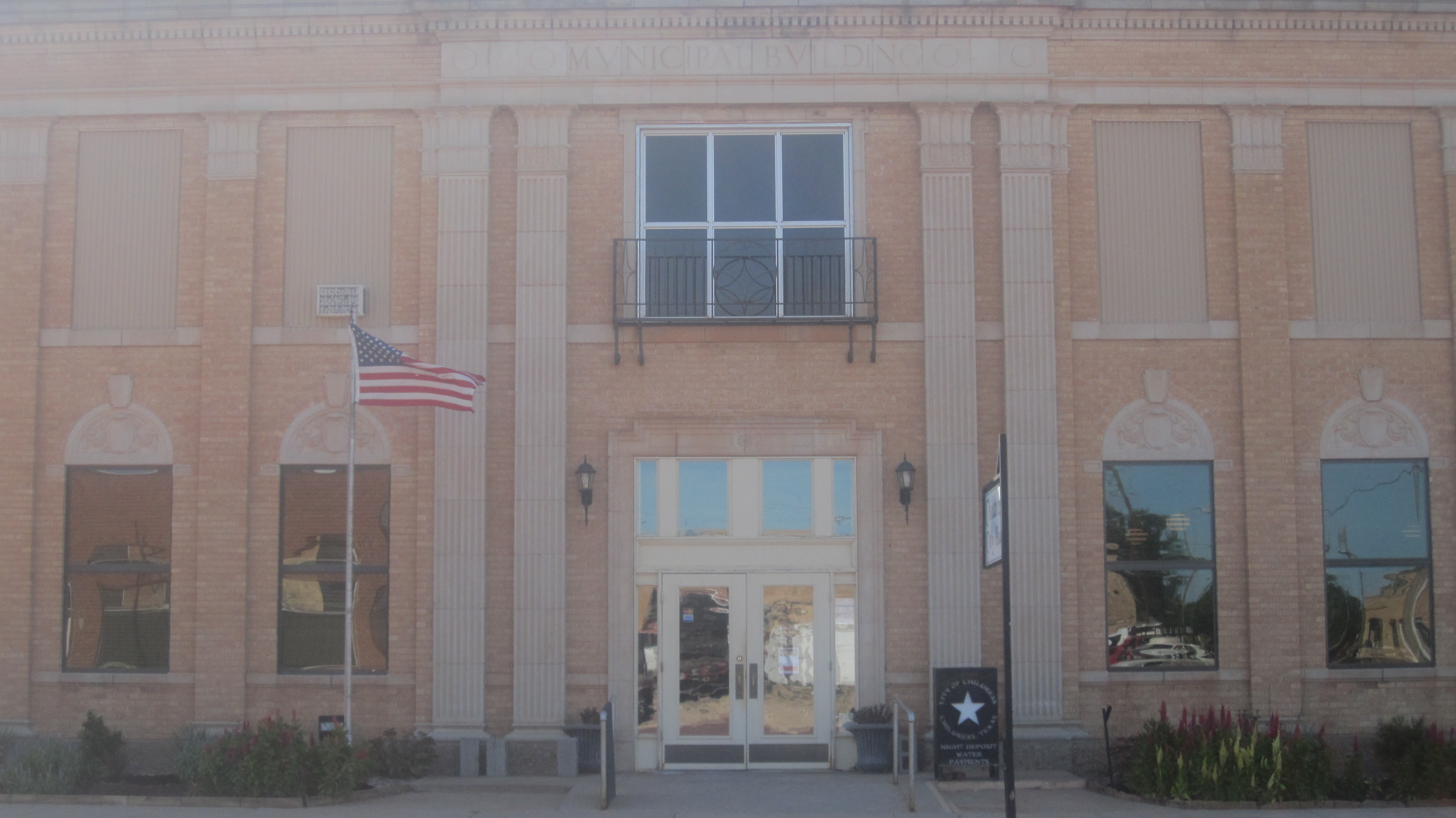
Childress Municipal Building

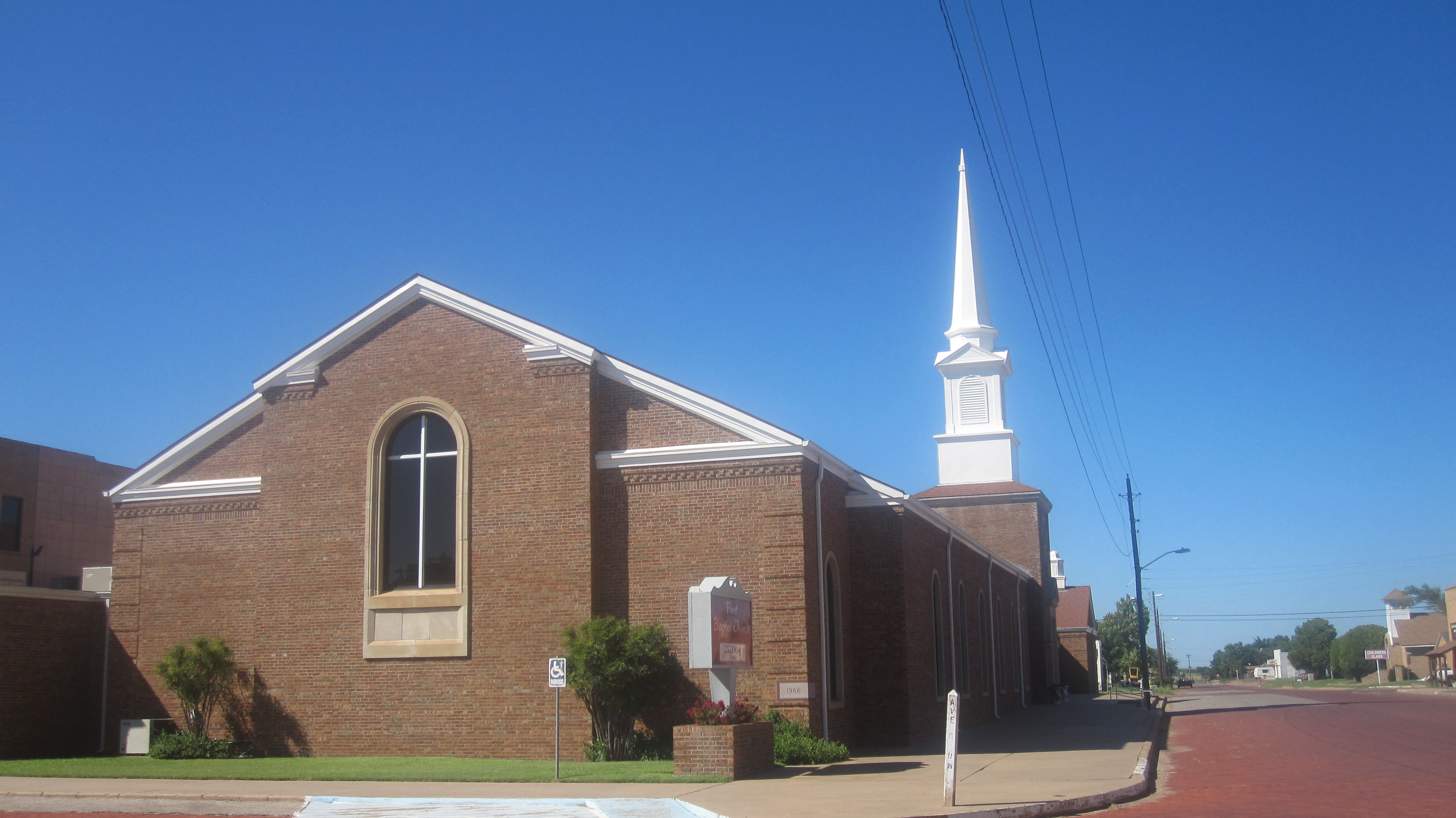
The steeple of the First Baptist Church of Childress (pastor Chad King) can be seen throughout the city.

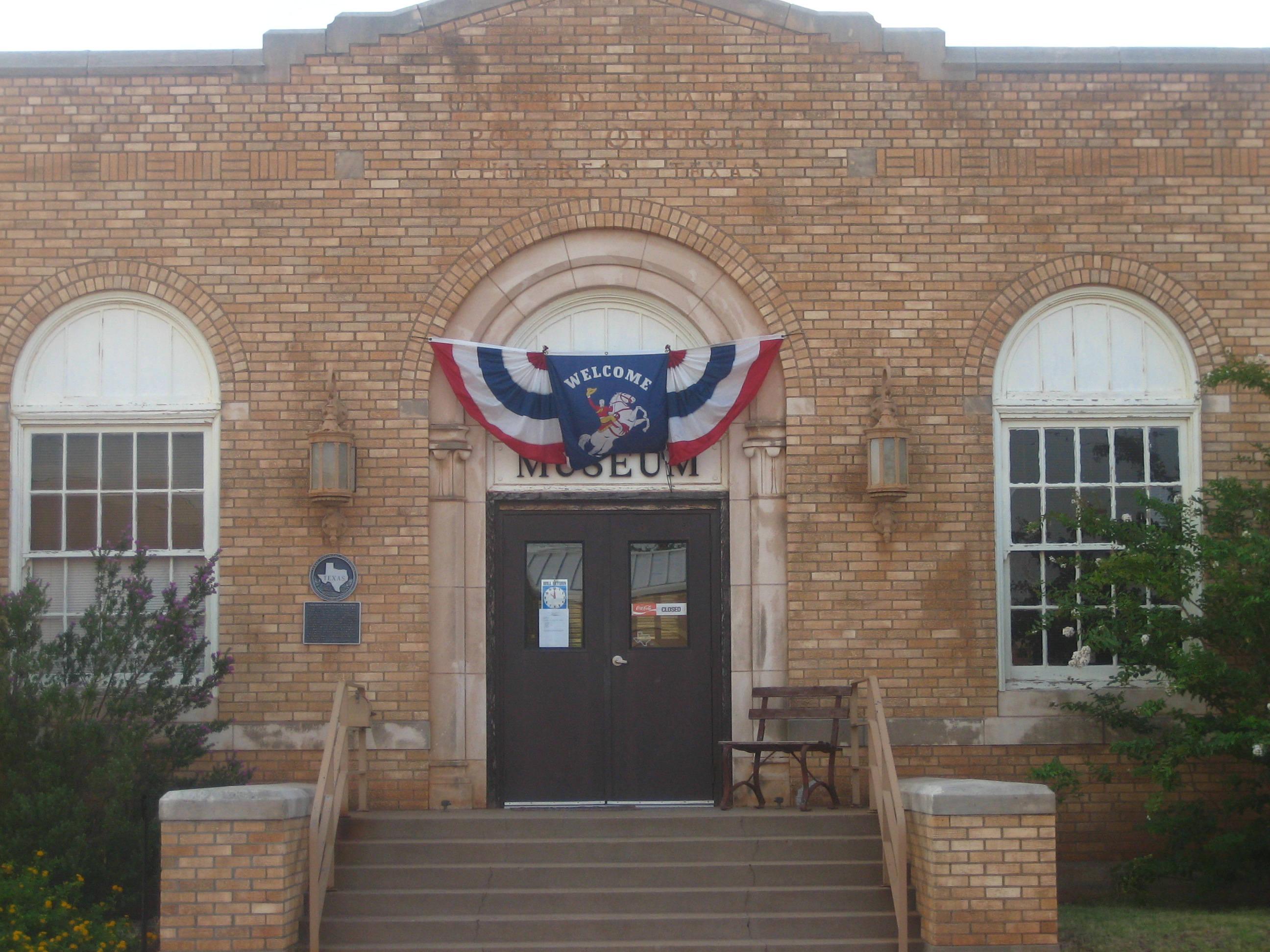
The Childress County Heritage Museum is housed in a former post office building across from the First Baptist Church.

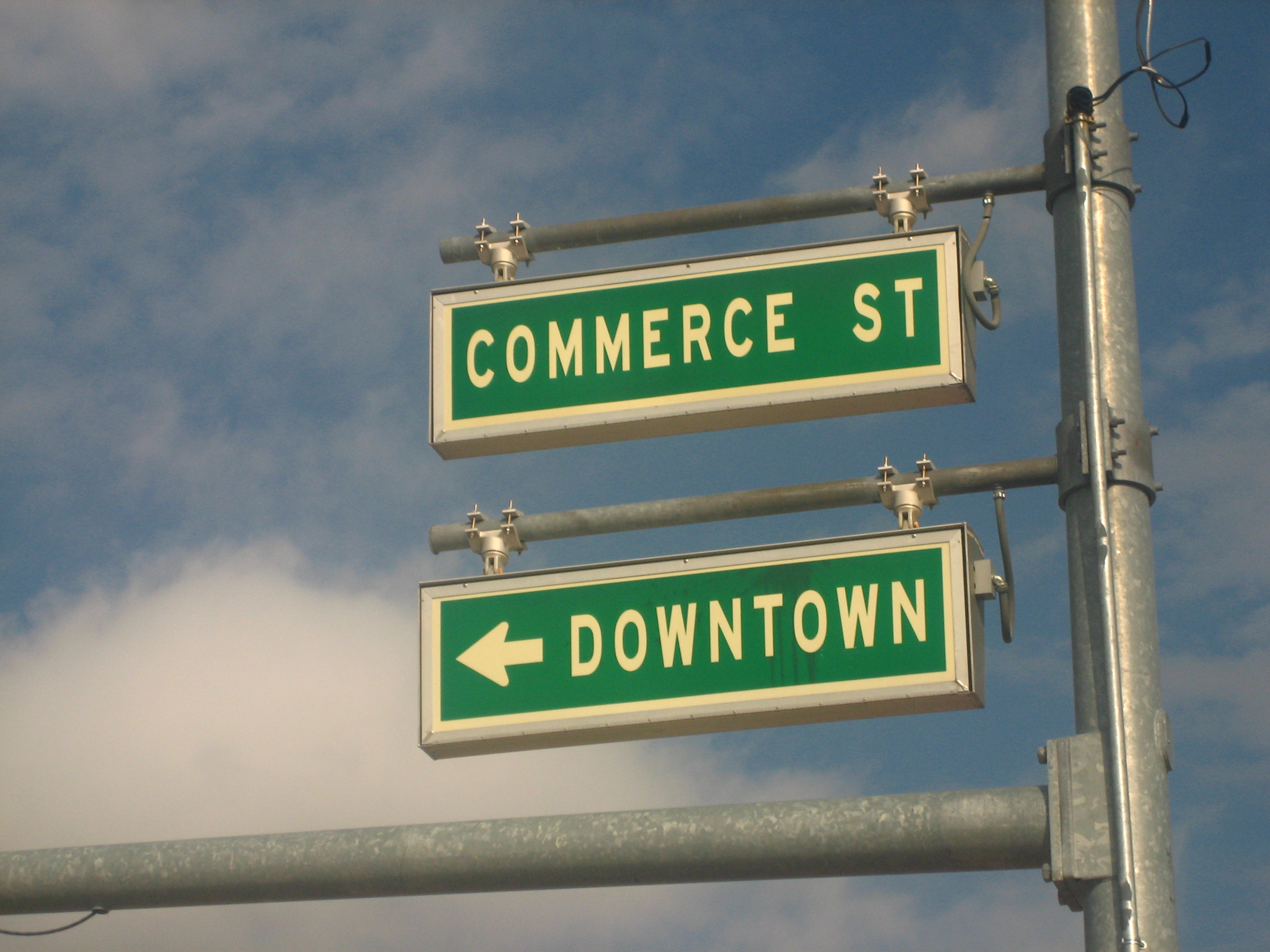
Sign on Highway 287 directs motorists into downtown Childress.

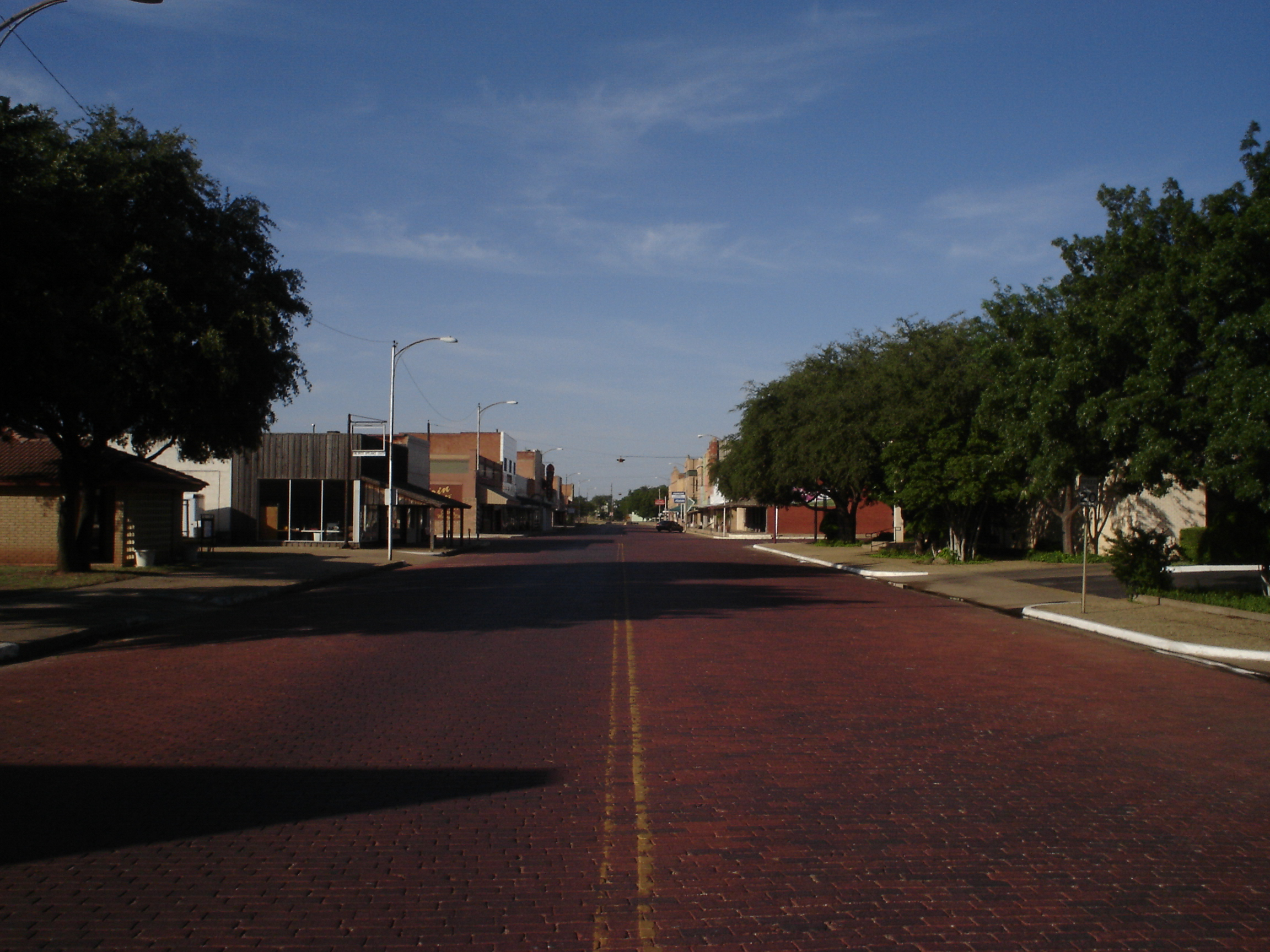
Main Street in downtown Childress

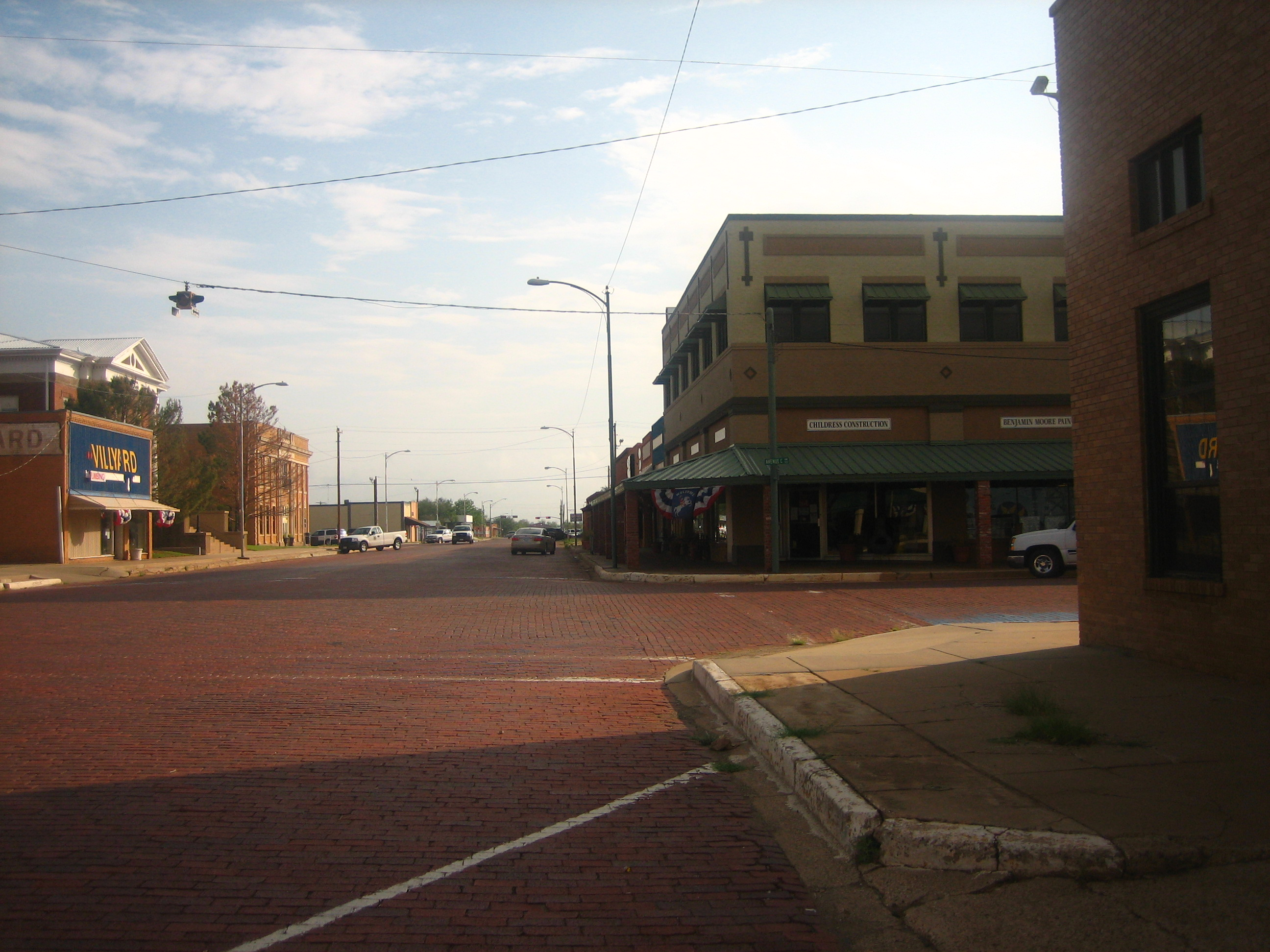
Brick streets of downtown Childress

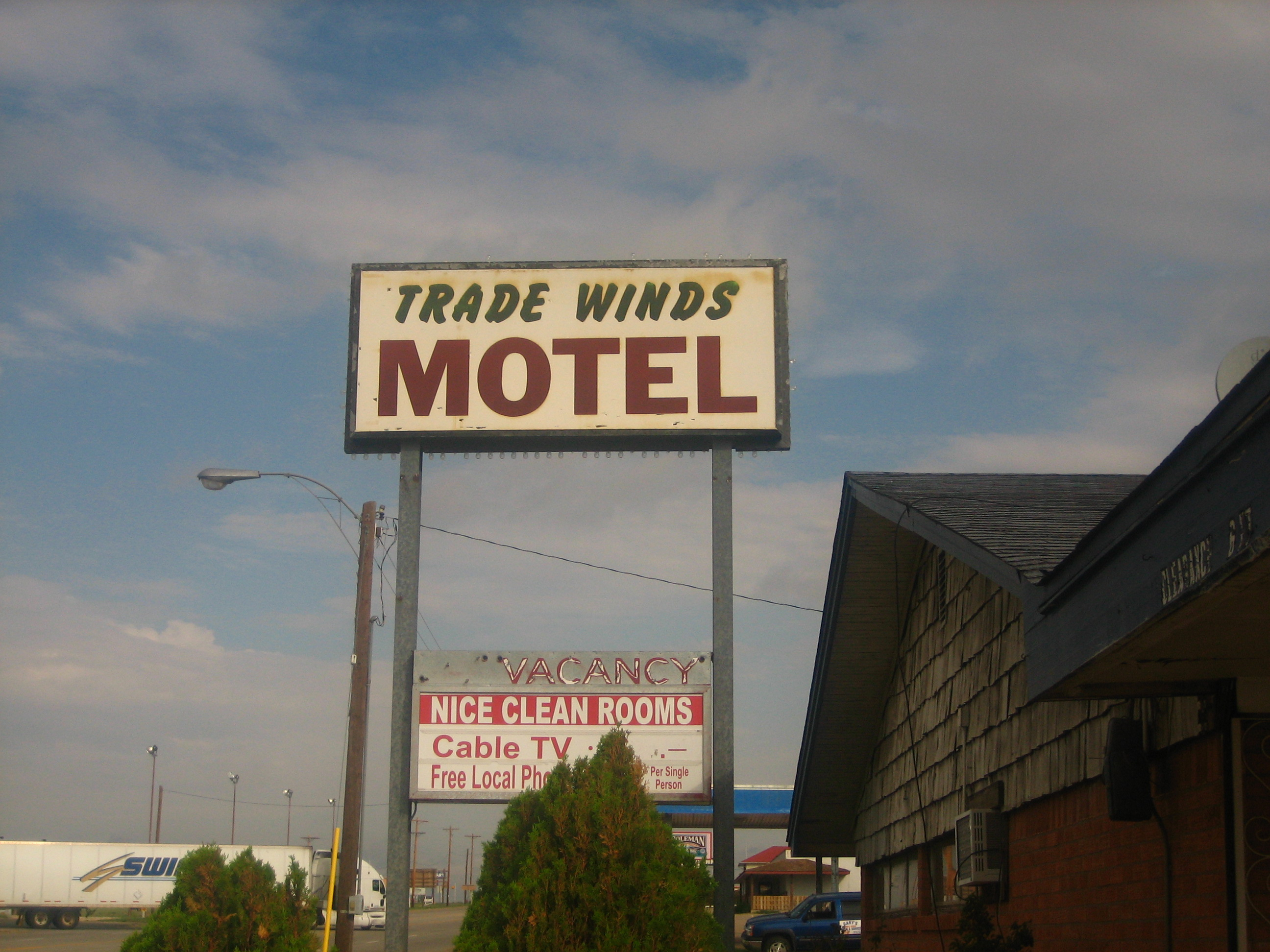
Since the 1950s, the Trade Winds Motel has hosted hunters, truckers, and Colorado-bound vacationers.

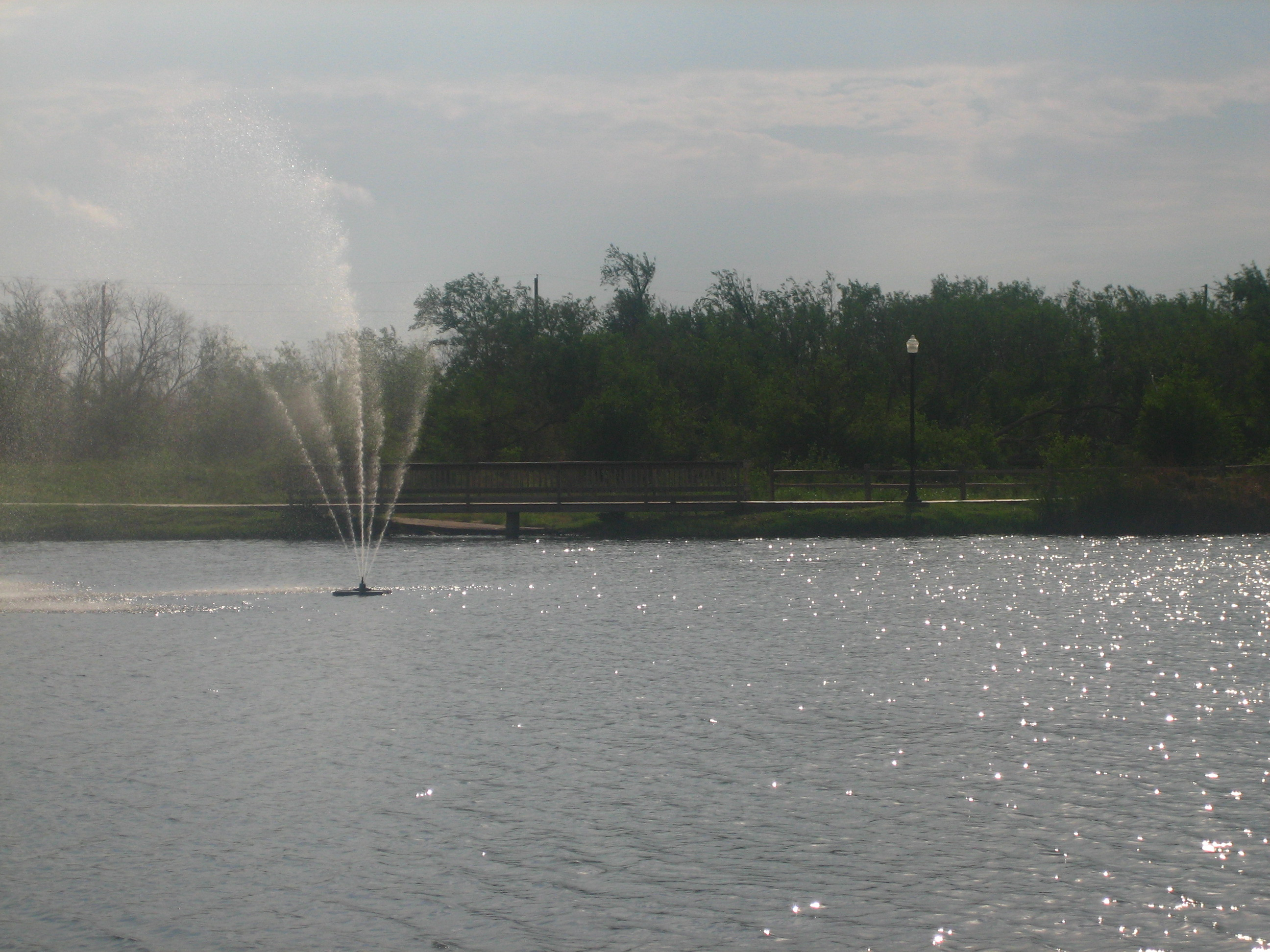
The refreshing fountain in the summer heat at Fair Park in Childress

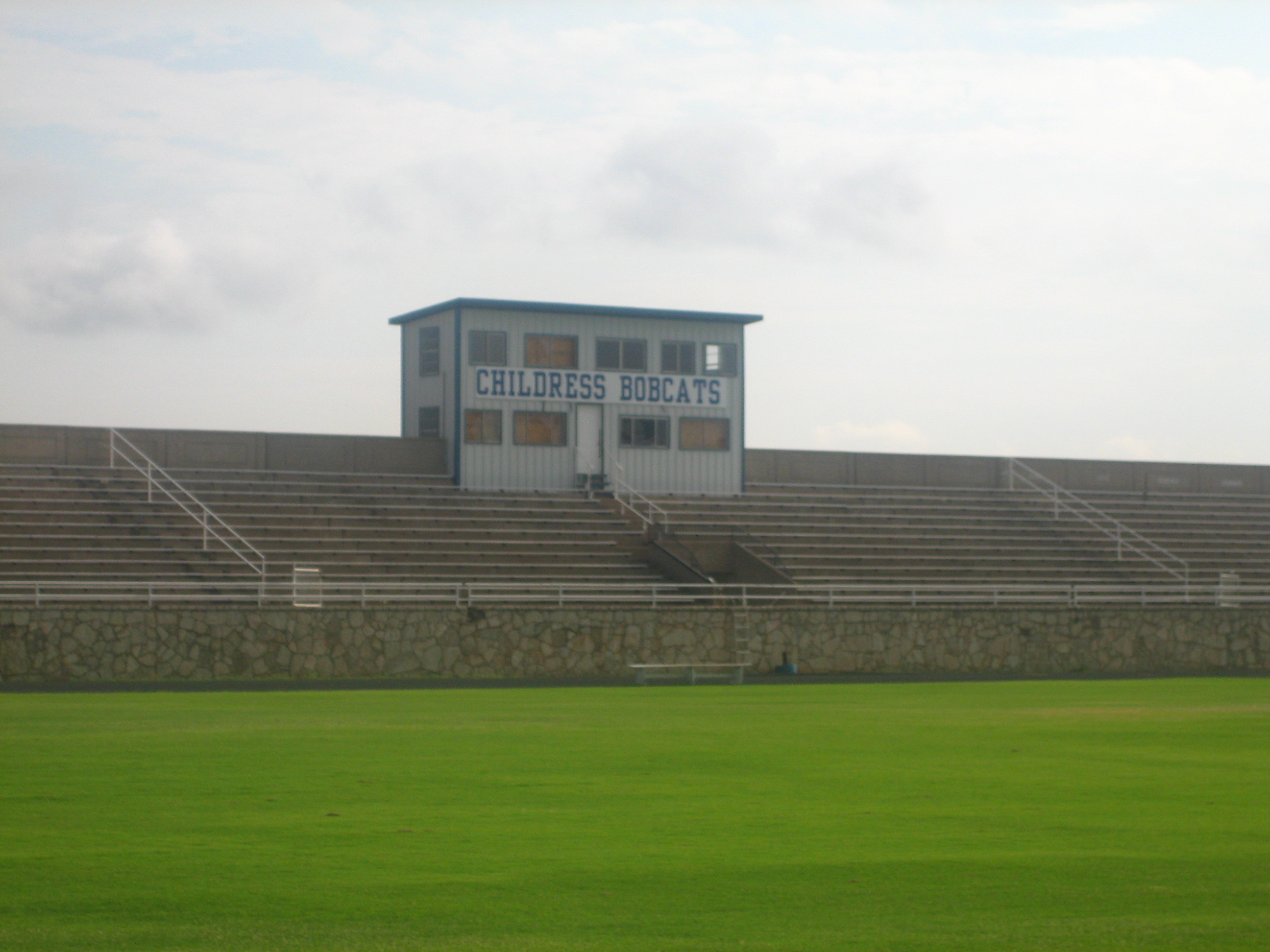
Bobcats Stadium in Fair Park in Childress

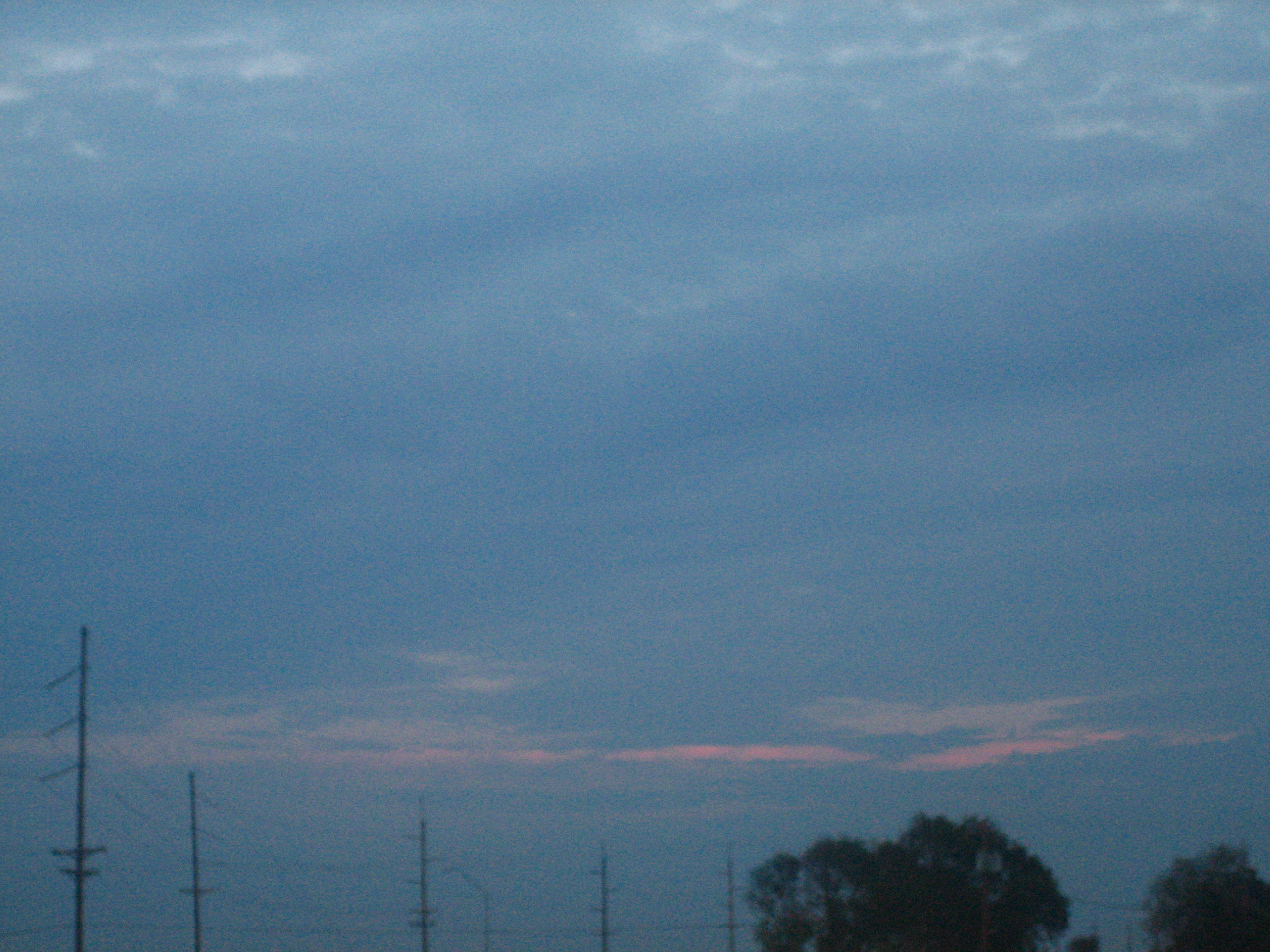
Summer sunset at Childress

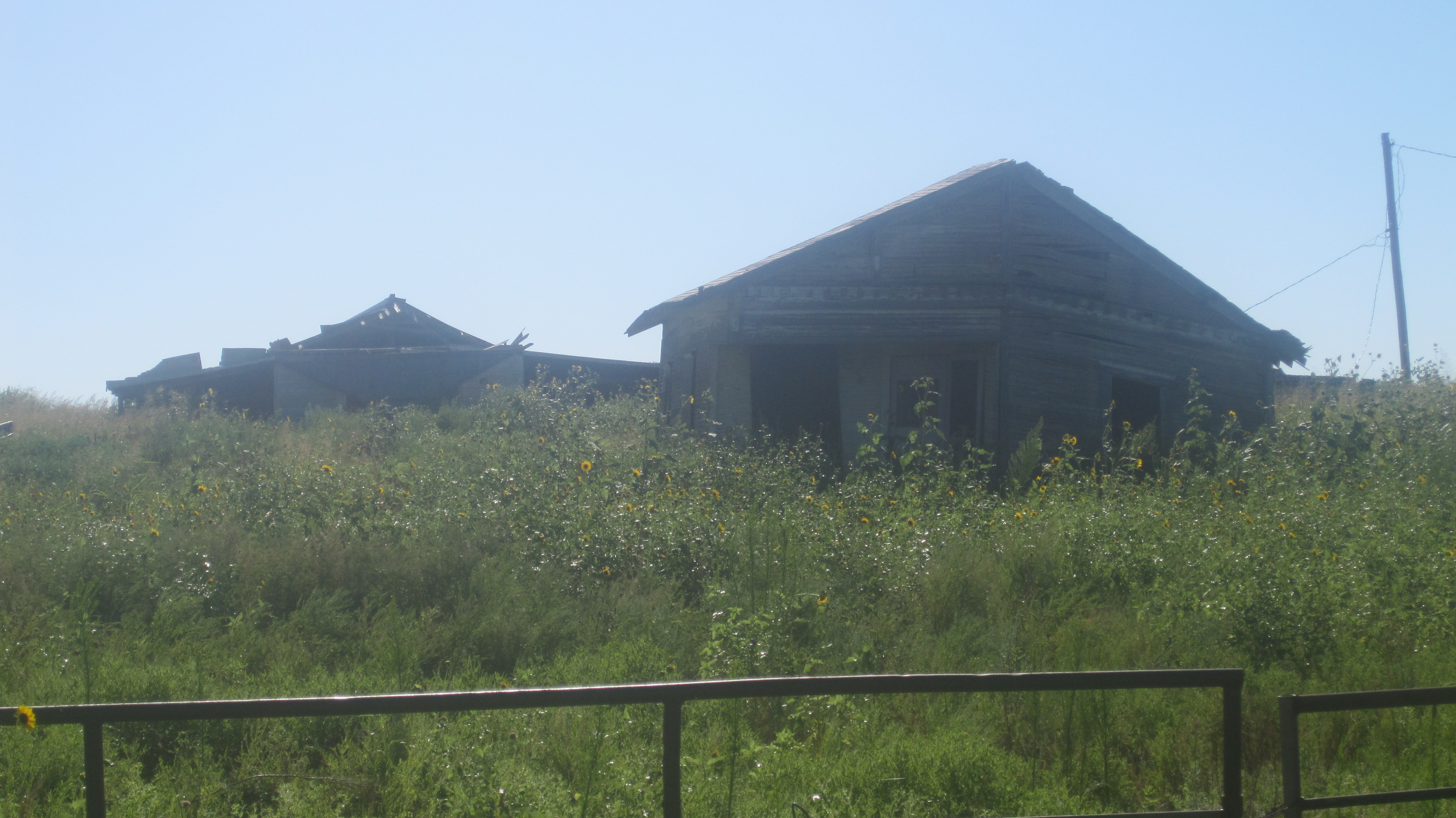
Abandoned buildings off U.S. Highway 83 south of Childress

== See also ==
- List of municipalities in Texas
