= KOLJ (AM) =

- Quanah, Texas; United States
- Frequency: 1150 kHz
- Branding: Country Classics

Programming
- Format: Classic country

Ownership
- Owner: James Gl. Boles, Jr.; (Paradise Broadcasting)
- Sister stations: KCTX

History
- First air date: June 7, 1951
- Former call signs: KOLJ (1951–1981); KIXC (1981–1991); KVDL (1991–2005); KREL (2005–2009)

Technical information
- Licensing authority: FCC
- Facility ID: 24250
- Class: D
- Power: 530 watts (day); 77 watts (night)
- Transmitter coordinates: 34°18′55.3″N 99°44′50.3″W
- Translators: 100.7 K264BI (Quanah); 101.7 K269GW (Vernon)

Links
- Public license information: Public file; LMS
- Webcast: Listen live
- Website: paradisebroadcasting.com/country-classics-kolj/

KOLJ is a radio station airing a classic country format licensed to Quanah, Texas, broadcasting on 1150 AM. The station is owned by James G. Boles, Jr.

== FM Translators ==
KOLJ is also heard on 100.7 FM through a translator located in Quanah, Texas and on 101.7 FM through a translator located in Vernon, Texas.

Broadcast translators for KOLJ
Call sign	Frequency	City of license	FID	ERP (W)	Class	FCC info
K264BI	100.7 FM	Quanah, Texas	154973	250	D	LMS
K269GW	101.7 FM	Vernon, Texas	200631	250	D	LMS
