= Gebser v. Lago Vista Independent School District =

- Supreme Court of the United States

Argued March 25, 1998 Decided June 22, 1998
- Full case name: Gebser v. Lago Independent School District
- Citations: 524 U.S. 274 (more)
- Argument: Oral argument

Court membership
- Chief Justice William Rehnquist Associate Justices John P. Stevens · Sandra Day O'Connor; Antonin Scalia · Anthony Kennedy; David Souter · Clarence Thomas; Ruth Bader Ginsburg · Stephen Breyer

Case opinions
- Majority: O'Connor, joined by Rehnquist, Scalia, Kennedy, Thomas
- Dissent: Stevens, joined by Souter, Ginsburg, Breyer
- Dissent: Ginsburg, joined by Stevens, Souter, Breyer

Laws applied
- Title IX, Rev. Stat. §1979, 42 U.S.C. § 1983

Gebser v. Lago Vista 524 U.S. 274 (1998) is a United States Supreme Court ruling regarding sexual harassment in schools. The case was heard before the Rehnquist Court on March 25, 1998, and decided on June 22, 1998. In a 5-4 ruling, the Court held that a school district may be liable for a teacher's sexual harassment of a student, but in order for an aggrieved party to recover damages under Title IX, a school official who had authority to address the alleged discrimination must have actual knowledge of the discrimination and must be deliberately indifferent.

== Case summary ==
Alida Star Gebser, a high school student in the Lago Vista Independent School District of Texas, sued the school district and one if its teachers for violating the Title IX and state negligence law. During the eighth grade, Alida Star Gebser, the plaintiff, was placed in a high school book discussion group led by Frank Waldrop, a Lago Vista high school teacher. During discussions, Waldrop made sexually suggestive remarks to students. When Gebser entered the Lago Vista High School, Waldrop continued to make sexual remarks. In the spring of 1992, Waldrop and Gebser's relationship became sexual. During the summer, the plaintiff was placed in Waldrop's Advancement Placement class. Gebser did not report the incident, and their sexual relationship continued with secret off-campus sexual encounters. During Gebser's freshman year, under the pretext of giving her a book relating to a school project, Waldrop made multiple sexual advances towards the plaintiff. Gebser later testified—

“I was terrified. I had no idea what I was supposed to do. I had trusted him. I had believed him. I—you know, he was basically my mentor. And it was terrifying. He was the main teacher at the school with whom I had discussions, and I didn’t know what to do."

While Lago Vista's superintendent was the district's Title IX coordinator, the Lago Vista School District had no official procedure for filing sexual harassment complaints and had not issued a formal anti-harassment policy.

Before the discovery of the relationship between Waldrop and Gebser, Lago Vista's principal received complaints of Waldrop's remarks from two other students and their parents. Waldrop apologized for the comments and was warned about his conduct, and the principal did not investigate the matter further. Waldrop met with the principal, apologized for the comments, and the principal did not investigate the matter further. The high school guidance counselor was informed of the meeting by the principal, yet the superintendent, the Title IX coordinator, was not told. In January 1993, a police officer discovered Gebser and Waldrop having sexual intercourse. Waldrop was fired, and his teaching license was revoked. The plaintiff and her mother originally suit only against Waldrop for violation of state tort law, but later amended the suit to join Lago Vista Independent School District for violations of the Civil Rights Act of 1866 and Title IX of the Educational Amendments of 1972.

== In the State and District Courts ==
Gebser and her mother sued against Lago Vista and Waldrop in state court, citing violations of Title IX, Rev. Stat. 42 U.S. Code § 1983, and state negligence law, seeking compensatory and punitive damages from both the school district and Waldrop. The case was removed to federal court where the United States District Court for the Western District of Texas granted summary judgment for Lago Vista and remanded the case against Waldrop to state court. Rejecting the Title IX claim, the district court ruled that Title IX was “enacted to counter policies of discrimination” and that “only if school administrators have some type of notice of the gender discrimination and fail to respond in good faith can the discrimination be interpreted as a policy of the school district.” Relating to the case, the parents’ complaints to the principal regarding Waldrop's comments, were insufficient.

On appeal, the Fifth Circuit ruled that the school district was not vicariously liable because “strict liability” is not part of the Title IX contract. Finding not enough evidence to prove a school official should have known about Waldrop and Gebser's relations, the Fifth Circuit ruled that Lago Vista would not be liable under a constructive notice theory of liability. The court rejected an agency theory, where an employer is vicariously liable for the tort of an employee accompanied by the “existence of the agency relationship.” The Fifth circuit ruled that a school district is not liable unless an official with supervisory power actually knew of the abuse and failed to end it.

== Background ==
Title IX provides that no “person…shall, on the basis of sex, be excluded from participation in, be denied the benefits of, or be subjected to discrimination under any education program or activity receiving Federal financial assistance.

One of the cases that established early procedural requirements for Title IX sexual harassment was Cannon v. University of Chicago (1979). In Cannon, the Supreme Court held that, although the text of Title IX does not contain a specific private cause of action for damages, nevertheless, it provides an implied private cause of action. This is due to the similarity of Title IX to Title VI, which has an implied right of action. Another early case that established Title IX procedure was Franklin v. Gwinnett County Public Schools (1992). In Franklin, the Supreme Court went beyond Cannon to explicitly hold that Title IX provides a damages remedy.

District courts have been divided about whether to compare the standard of liability of Title IX to Title VI or to Title VII. The text and subject matter of Title IX is closer to Title VII, which deals with gender discrimination and sexual harassment. Following Title VII, courts tend to adopt strict liability, agency principles, or a constructive notice theory. The division between the district courts arose because the only guidance the Supreme Court provided was that Title IX should be given “a sweep as broad as its language.” As a result of the unclarity, four different standards of school district liability arose in the circuit courts: actual knowledge, constructive knowledge, agency principles, and strict liability.

Actual knowledge is synonymous with intentional discrimination, a knowing failure to act on allegations of discrimination. The person with actual knowledge must be in a position of authority and must fail to respond adequately to the situation. Constructive knowledge would require that a school district “knew or should have known” of the harassment and failed to address it. This doctrine was developed in the Supreme Court case Meritor Savings Bank v. Vinson (1986), where the court ruled sexual harassment is a violation of Title VII of the Civil Rights Act of 1964. Agency theory, in the context of Title IX, would bean a school district would be held liable for the actions of a teacher, even if those actions were outside the scope of the job, if the school discriminated intentionally, negligently, or recklessly or if the teacher was aided in performing a tort by virtue of his or her agency relationship with the school. Regarding types of harassment, in a quid pro quo situation, a school would always be held liable because the harasser uses authority that has been granted by the school. For hostile environment claims, a school would be held liable if the employee acted with authority or was aided in the harassing by their position of authority.

== Supreme Court Ruling ==
The Supreme Court granted certiorari to resolve the split among the circuits regarding the two questions: whether a school district could be held liable under Title IX with actual or constructive notice, and second, whether a court may use agency principles to establish Title IX liability as in Title VII cases. In a 5-4 ruling written by Justice O’Connor, the court held that a Title IX plaintiff could not recover damages unless a school district official, with authority to institute corrective measures on behalf of the school district, had actual notice of, and was deliberately indifferent to the teacher's misconduct. As the ruling in Franklin was broad regarding liability, the Lago Vista ruling had a “measure of latitude to shape a sensible remedial scheme that best comports with the statute.” The majority also concluded that Title IX was modeled after Title VI, which the court has ruled is under to the Spending Clause legislation. Due to this, the ruling explained that it must “examine closely the propriety of private actions holding the recipient liable in monetary damages for noncompliance with the condition." Effectively, the ruling that Title IX was enacted under the Spending Clause, would require that the recipients of those funds have clear notice of potential liability that it may incur when it chooses to accept the federal funds.

Applying this new standard of actual notice plus deliberate indifference to the Gebser case, the Court ruled that the complaint to the school principal was insufficient to alert the school district that Waldrop was involved in a sexual relationship with one of the students, and that Lago Vista's failure to establish a sexual harassment grievance procedure did not amount to either actual notice or deliberate indifference. The Court refused to allow recovery under a less strict standard than actual knowledge unless Congress addressed the issue directly.

=== Dissent ===
Justice Stevens, joined by Justice Souter, Justice Ginsburg, and Justice Breyer dissented, arguing that the majority's reasoning in Gebser was contrary to precedent and the Court's “duty to interpret” Congressional legislation. Citing Cannon, Steven's dissent argues that Congress was aware of the Supreme Court's interpretation of Title VI to include a private right of action and expected the interpretation of Title IX to do the same. Regarding the language of Title IX, the dissent argues that the language focuses on the victim of discrimination, rather than on the tort-feasor. As a result, the tort-feasor is entitled to greater protection than if the statute merely banned discriminatory conduct by those receiving federal funds. Rather than encourage districts to root out sexual harassment, the dissent argues the majority's ruling in Gebser would provide incentives for district to turn a blind eye to sexual harassment and hide any evidence of wrongdoing.

Justice Ginsburg also authored a dissent, joined by Justice Souter and Breyer, that argued for the same standard of liability established in Faragher v. City of Boca Raton (1998).
