= Tower Amendment =

Proposed amendment to Title IX

The Tower Amendment was a 1974 proposed amendment to the United States Securities Exchange Act of 1934, named after Texas Republican Senator John Tower, who introduced it. The Tower Amendment was intended to modify Title IX.

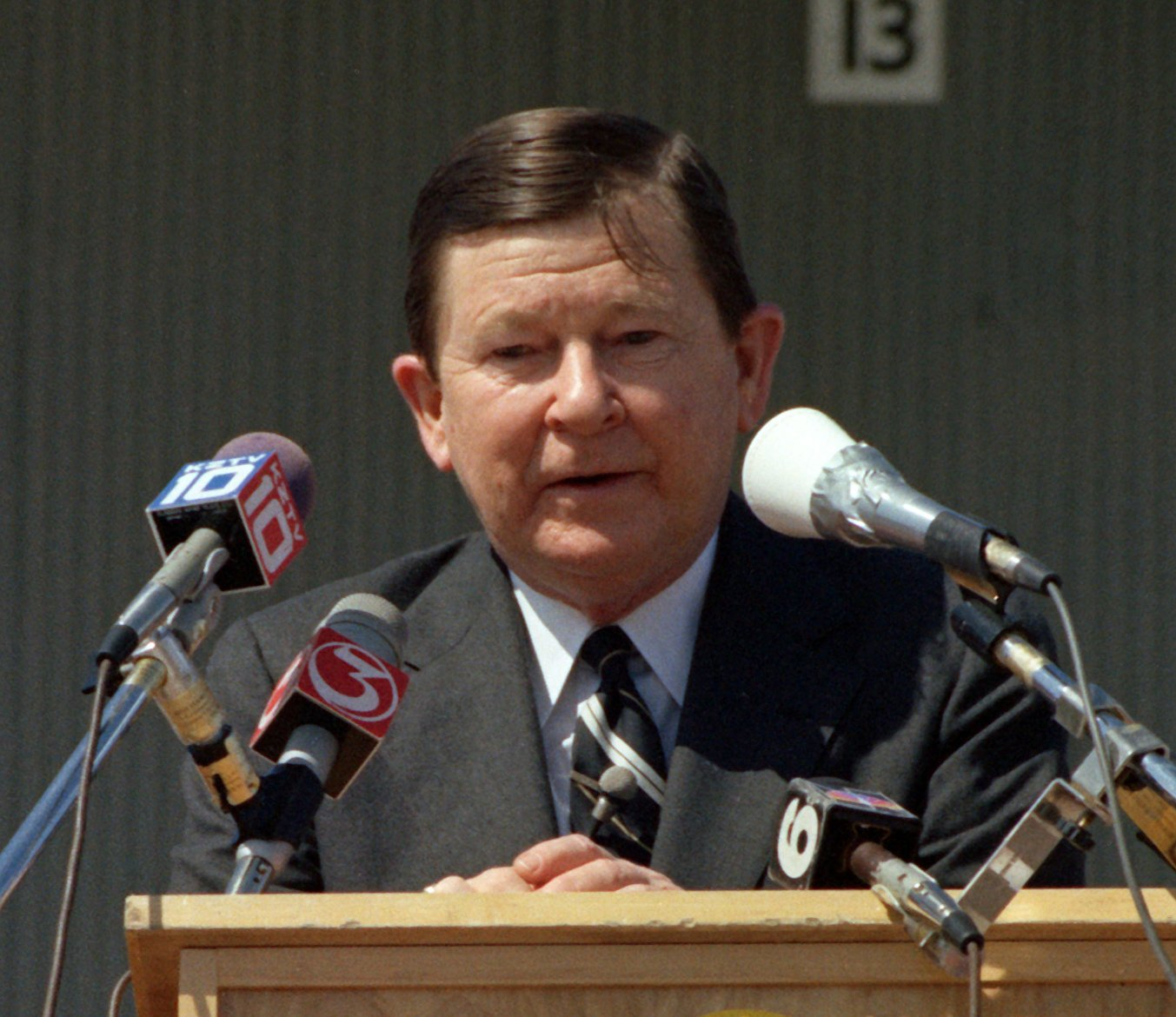
Republican Senator John Tower speaking during a welcoming ceremony, 1982

== Historical background ==
The Tower Amendment, introduced in the United States Senate in 1974, was a bill meant to restrict the power of Title IX, which was signed into law by former President Richard Nixon on June 23, 1972. Title IX states that "No person in the United States shall, on the basis of sex, be excluded from participation in, be denied the benefits of, or be subjected to discrimination under any education program or activity receiving Federal financial assistance" and was signed into law by former President Richard Nixon on June 23, 1972. The amendment, however, was never passed. Senator John Tower, a Republican from Texas, sought to exempt revenue-producing sports from Title IX. It was meant to "provide equal access for male and female students to the educational process and the extracurricular activities in a school, where there is not a unique facet such as football involved".

The amendment, however, was rejected by the Senate, so John Tower started a movement along with several other senators to pass the bill. They felt that requiring equal federal funding for both girls and boys sports would curtail the profits made by revenue-producing sports. For example, a male sport such as football, which requires more money for gear and events, as well as produces more revenue, than a sport like girls volleyball, might suffer if their funding was significantly decreased. They firmly believed that this mandate would hurt the schools and that the federal government was overstepping its constitutional powers, and that the only "reasonable solution [was] to allow revenue producing sports to support themselves while making excess funds available to other sports for men and women".

Despite the rejection by the Senate, other senators who supported Tower's proposal joined forces, creating the Javits Amendment one month after the Tower Amendment's rejection. The Javits Amendment was similar to the Tower Amendment, and was proposed by Senator Javits, a Republican from New York. He requested that the Department of Health, Education, and Welfare (HEW) issue regulations on Title IX regarding intercollegiate athletic activities. He, like Tower, believed that revenue-producing sports should not be taken into account when considering Title IX compliance. However, his proposal was also rejected, and the HEW instead required that schools provide equal opportunity to men and women in athletics. Still, the growing group of senators and representatives continued to push for restrictions on Title IX. In 1975, Representative O’Hara, a Democrat from Michigan, introduced House Bill 8394, which proposed the usage of revenue produced by a certain sport to pay for that sport's extra cost, then use the excess to pay for additional costs in other sports. However, his bill died in committee.

In 1977, Senators Tower, Bartlett, and Hruska introduced Senate Bill 2106, which would exclude revenue-producing sports from Title IX. Though the fight continued, the Senate rejected this last attempt at passing the amendment. In the 1984 ruling of Grove City v Bell, the Supreme Court stated that Title IX did not apply to sports, except in the case of scholarship opportunities. This ruling was reversed by the Civil Rights Restoration Act of 1987, which required equality in federal funding for sports. Still, opponents of Title IX did not give up, and the National Wrestling Association, the College Gymnastics Association, and the US Track Coaches Association, representing male sports, filed suit against Title IX, saying that the regulations were unconstitutional. The Department of Justice dismissed the suit of narrow grounds, and the government continued to enforce equal spending in sports. The Equity in Athletics Disclosure Act was passed in 1994 to reinforce equality in federal funding for schools, and required that coeducational colleges and universities that used federal funds for student financial aid programs needed to submit annual reports with information about intercollegiate athletics programs.

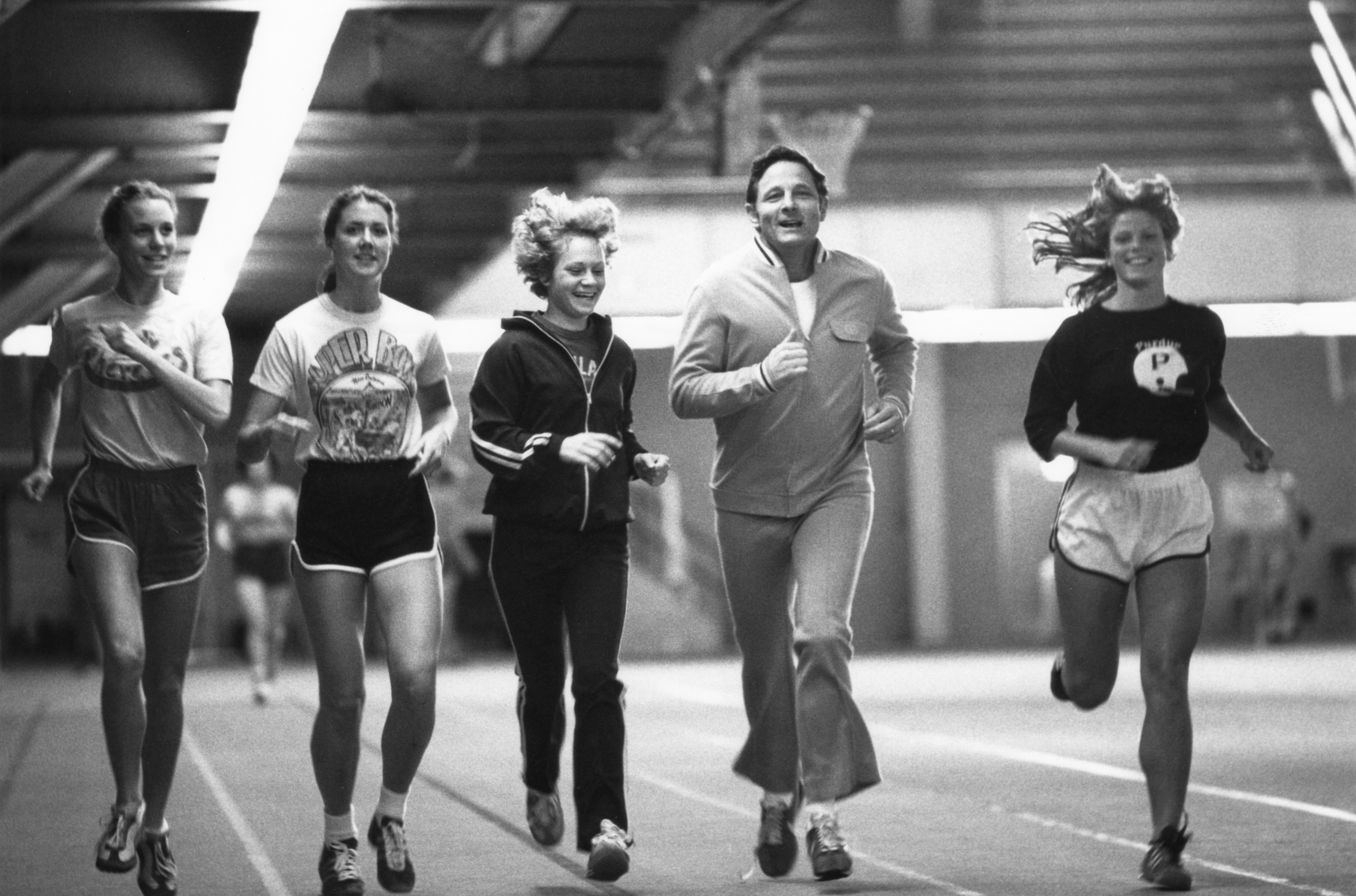
Women Participating in Sports 1970s with Former Democratic Senator Birch Bayh.

== Resistance to the Tower Amendment ==
The Tower Amendment would have ended the rule that both men and women's intercollegiate sports, taking place in federal financially funded institutions, needed to allocate the same amount of revenue. Many senators disagreed with the Tower Amendment and their reasoning stemmed from arguments made by former Democratic Senator, Birch Bayh, that it would create a "blanket exemption from Title IX" and propositions from the Subcommittee on Education that "all athletic scholarships should be limited to men". Some senators thought this would nullify the progress made through the passage of Title IX in 1972.

The efforts to limit the regulations around revenue producing sports under Title IX led to a pattern of amendments being proposed and rejected by the Senate. For example, The Javits Amendment, proposed after the Tower Amendment was dismissed by the Senate, suggested regulations on intercollegiate sports from the Department of Health, Education, and Welfare in 1974. Additionally, House Bill 8394 in 1975 faced a similar fate. As journalist Karen Blumenthal wrote, "These sports, mainly football and basketball, had huge budgets already established for men, which coaches wanted untouched by other programs, especially women's programs. But, as Blumenthal added, "How could the balance even be if the 105 spots on a football team at the time--and the 105 athletic scholarships that went along with them--didn't count at all"?

Some senators believed that the passage of the Tower Amendment would not affect title IX, which would continue to apply appropriately to the rest of intercollegiate athletics, including the generation of money to sustain sports producing less revenue. Other senators thought that the amendment was diluted. The Tower Amendment called for sports to split the revenue of their major revenue producing sports and apply it to other less revenue producing sports. The Republican Senator from Nebraska, Roman Hruska drew attention towards Nebraska football that made $800,000 in one season. He questioned how much money the government would make him give to women's athletics. He also questioned what would happen if the football program declined and there was no more money because it had to be shared. He believed that the enactment of the law would get rid of confusion and the complicated measures of Title IX. The Tower Amendment was believed to help protect the revenues of major producing sports at each college. Other colleges such as Southern Methodist University voiced similar concerns about the controlling of revenues through Title IX.

== See also ==
- Title IX
- Education Amendment of 1972
