= J.I. Case Co. v. Borak =

- Supreme Court of the United States

Argued April 22–23, 1964 Decided June 8, 1964
- Full case name: J. I. Case Company v. Carl H. Borak
- Docket no.: 402
- Citations: 377 U.S. 426 (more)

Case history
- Prior: Borak v. J. I. Case Co., 317 F.2d 838 (7th Cir. 1963), cert. granted, 375 U.S. 901 (1963)

Holding
- Section 14(a) of the Securities Exchange Act of 1934 implies a private right of action for shareholders injured by materially false or misleading proxy solicitations, and federal courts may grant appropriate remedies.

Court membership
- Chief Justice Earl Warren Associate Justices Hugo Black · William O. Douglas; Tom C. Clark · John M. Harlan II; William J. Brennan Jr. · Potter Stewart; Byron White · Arthur Goldberg

Case opinion
- Majority: Clark, joined by unanimous

Laws applied
- Securities Exchange Act of 1934, § 14(a); § 27

J.I. Case Co. v. Borak, 377 U.S. 426 (1964), was a United States Supreme Court case in which the court held that corporate shareholders have an implied private right of action to bring suit under Section 14(a) of the Securities Exchange Act of 1934 for materially false or misleading proxy statements. The court also held that federal courts may grant appropriate relief, including damages and rescission, in such suits.

The case is widely treated as an important example of the Supreme Court's earlier, more purposeful approach to implied private rights of action under federal statutes.

== Background ==
In 1959, J. I. Case Company proposed a merger with the American Tractor Corporation. Carl H. Borak, a Case shareholder who owned 2,000 shares acquired before the merger, alleged that the proxy materials used to obtain shareholder approval contained false and misleading statements in violation of Section 14(a) and Rule 14a-9. He sought to block the merger and, after it was completed, sought rescission and damages for himself and other similarly situated shareholders.

The United States District Court for the Eastern District of Wisconsin held that, in a private suit under the federal securities laws, it could grant only declaratory relief on Borak's federal claim. It also treated a Wisconsin security-for-expenses statute as applicable to the requested relief and ordered Borak to post a $75,000 bond. When he did not do so, the district court dismissed most of the complaint.

On interlocutory appeal, the United States Court of Appeals for the Seventh Circuit reversed. The Seventh Circuit held that the federal courts had the power to award appropriate remedies under the Securities Exchange Act and that the Wisconsin statute did not bar that relief.

The Supreme Court granted certiorari.

== Opinion of the court ==
The Supreme Court issued an opinion on June 8, 1964.

Justice Tom C. Clark delivered the opinion for a unanimous court. The Court held that Section 14(a), read together with Section 27 of the Act, supports a private right of action for shareholders injured by misleading proxy solicitations. The court reasoned that Congress enacted the proxy rules to protect investors and fair corporate suffrage, and that private enforcement was a necessary supplement to enforcement by the SEC.

The court also rejected the argument that federal relief should be limited to prospective or declaratory remedies. It held that federal courts may fashion appropriate relief, including damages and rescission, and that state procedural rules do not control the existence or scope of the federal right. The Court did not decide what remedy Borak should ultimately receive; it held only that the federal courts had authority to consider such relief on the merits.

== Later treatment and legacy ==
Borak is commonly discussed as a leading example of the Supreme Court's older willingness to infer private remedies from broad statutory purposes. Later cases, including Cort v. Ash and Alexander v. Sandoval, took a more restrictive approach to implied rights of action and are often contrasted with Borak in legal scholarship.

Even so, Borak remained an important early precedent in federal proxy litigation and in the development of implied-rights doctrine under the federal securities laws.
