= State of Tennessee v. Cardona =

2025 U.S. federal district court case on Title IX regulations

- Court: United States District Court for the Eastern District of Kentucky
- Full case name: State of Tennessee et al. v. Miguel Cardona et al.
- Decided: January 9, 2025
- Docket nos.: 2:24-cv-00072-DCR-CJS
- Citation: 762 F. Supp. 3d 615; 2025 WL 63795

Court membership
- Judge sitting: Danny C. Reeves

Keywords
- Title IX, Administrative Procedure Act, First Amendment, Spending Clause, Transgender rights

State of Tennessee v. Cardona is a 2025 decision of the United States District Court for the Eastern District of Kentucky that vacated nationwide the Department of Education's 2024 regulations implementing Title IX. Judge Danny C. Reeves held that the 2024 Nondiscrimination on the Basis of Sex in Education Programs or Activities Receiving Federal Financial Assistance rule exceeded the agency's statutory authority, violated several constitutional provisions, and was arbitrary and capricious under the Administrative Procedure Act.

The decision was the first final judgment among a series of lawsuits challenging the Biden administration's 2024 Title IX regulations. The federal government did not appeal the district court's final judgment. Because the court vacated the rule in its entirety, the 2020 Title IX regulations adopted under the Trump administration again became the operative federal regulations governing sex discrimination and sexual harassment in education programs receiving federal funds.

== Background ==
=== Title IX and its regulations ===
Title IX of the Education Amendments of 1972 prohibits discrimination "on the basis of sex" in education programs or activities receiving federal financial assistance. Congress left much of the statute's implementation to executive agencies, and the Department of Education has long enforced Title IX through administrative regulations and guidance.

In 2020, the Department issued comprehensive regulations governing sexual harassment under Title IX. The 2020 rule defined actionable sexual harassment as conduct that is "severe, pervasive, and objectively offensive" and limited schools' obligations to respond to certain categories of misconduct, adopting standards derived from Davis v. Monroe County Board of Education. It also imposed detailed grievance procedures, including live hearings and cross-examination in higher education, which critics argued discouraged reporting and favored respondents.

=== The 2024 Title IX rule ===
On April 29, 2024, the Department of Education published a final rule revising its Title IX regulations. Among other changes, the 2024 rule defined sex discrimination to include discrimination based on sex stereotypes, sex characteristics, pregnancy or related conditions, sexual orientation, and gender identity. The rule provided that policies preventing a person from participating in an education program or activity consistent with their gender identity would ordinarily constitute prohibited sex discrimination.

The 2024 regulations also replaced the 2020 definition of sexual harassment with a broader standard that covered conduct that is subjectively and objectively offensive and that limits or denies a person's ability to participate in or benefit from an education program or activity. They expanded protections for pregnant and parenting students and modified grievance procedures, reducing some hearing requirements while imposing additional obligations on schools to respond to sex-based harassment. The rule was scheduled to take effect on August 1, 2024, and to apply to complaints received on or after that date.

The 2024 Title IX rule was announced alongside, but separate from, a proposed athletics regulation addressing participation of transgender students in sex-separated sports teams. State of Tennessee v. Cardona concerned only the general Title IX rule governing sex discrimination and harassment, not the separate athletics proposal.

== Litigation ==
=== Filing and parties ===
On April 30, 2024, the states of Tennessee, Kentucky, Ohio, Indiana, Virginia, and West Virginia filed suit in the Eastern District of Kentucky challenging the 2024 Title IX rule. The plaintiff states alleged that the rule's interpretation of "sex" to encompass gender identity and sexual orientation conflicted with the text of Title IX and other federal statutes, intruded on state authority over education, and threatened their ability to enforce state laws governing bathrooms, locker rooms, and athletics. They also asserted claims under the Administrative Procedure Act, the Spending Clause, the Tenth Amendment, and the First Amendment.

Several private parties later intervened as plaintiffs, including the Christian Educators Association International and an individual student represented under a pseudonym. The defendants were Secretary of Education Miguel Cardona and the Department of Education, represented by the Department of Justice.

=== Preliminary injunction ===
On June 17, 2024, Judge Reeves granted a preliminary injunction barring the Department from enforcing the 2024 rule in the six plaintiff states and with respect to the intervenor plaintiffs. The court concluded that the plaintiffs were likely to succeed on the merits of several claims, including that Title IX's reference to "sex" does not encompass gender identity and that certain provisions of the rule conflicted with the First Amendment and the Spending Clause. The injunction prevented the rule from taking effect in the covered jurisdictions when its effective date arrived on August 1, 2024.

The Department moved for a partial stay of the injunction, arguing that the rule was severable and should be allowed to take effect except as to provisions concerning gender identity and hostile-environment harassment. Judge Reeves denied the stay on July 10, 2024, and the Department sought an emergency partial stay from the Sixth Circuit. On July 17, 2024, a divided Sixth Circuit panel denied the requested stay.

The government then applied to the Supreme Court of the United States for a partial stay of the injunction in both Tennessee and a related case from Louisiana. On August 16, 2024, the Court denied the application; Justice Sonia Sotomayor dissented, joined by Justices Neil Gorsuch, Elena Kagan, and Ketanji Brown Jackson, arguing that the rule was severable and that the lower courts should have stayed only the challenged provisions.

=== Summary judgment and vacatur ===
The plaintiff states and intervenors moved for summary judgment on July 26, 2024; the Department filed a cross-motion for summary judgment on August 23, 2024. On January 9, 2025, Judge Reeves granted summary judgment to the plaintiffs and vacated the 2024 rule in its entirety. The court held that Title IX's text, structure, and history did not support the Department's interpretation of "sex" to encompass gender identity and sexual orientation, rejecting reliance on Bostock v. Clayton County as a basis for extending Title IX beyond biological sex. It concluded that the rule's requirements regarding facilities, pronoun usage, and participation in sex-separated activities effectively compelled schools and employees to affirm gender identities in violation of the First Amendment.

The opinion further held that the rule's definition of sex-based harassment was unconstitutionally overbroad and vague, both because it potentially encompassed a wide range of protected speech and because it failed to give adequate notice of what conduct was prohibited. Judge Reeves also found a violation of the Spending Clause, reasoning that the rule imposed conditions on federal funding that Title IX did not unambiguously authorize. Finally, he concluded that the Department's rulemaking was arbitrary and capricious under the Administrative Procedure Act because the agency did not provide a reasoned explanation for departing from the 2020 regulations and failed adequately to address concerns raised in public comments.

Judge Reeves rejected the Department's argument that any unlawful provisions could be severed, holding instead that the defects permeated the rule and warranted vacatur of the regulations in their entirety. The accompanying judgment immediately vacated the 2024 rule nationwide.

== Subsequent proceedings ==
The Department of Education did not appeal the January 9, 2025 final judgment. In March 2025, the Sixth Circuit dismissed the government's interlocutory appeal from the preliminary injunction as moot, explaining that entry of the unappealed final judgment "extinguished" the appeal.

Several non-governmental intervenors and advocacy organizations subsequently filed appeals challenging aspects of the district court's decision, including the scope of the vacatur and the treatment of the rule's sex-based harassment provisions. As of late 2025, those appeals remained pending in the Sixth Circuit in cases captioned Tennessee v. McMahon and related matters.

Following the district court's judgment, the Department of Education announced that, in light of the vacatur, it would continue to enforce Title IX under the 2020 regulations while evaluating its options. Legal commentators noted that, because Tennessee v. Cardona involved a nationwide vacatur and the federal government did not appeal, the decision effectively prevented any portion of the 2024 Title IX rule from taking effect absent further legislative or judicial action.

== Impact and commentary ==
Scholars and practitioners have described State of Tennessee v. Cardona as a major turning point in the relationship between federal agencies and the courts in administering Title IX. Walker argued that the decision, combined with the Supreme Court's contemporaneous holding in Loper Bright Enterprises v. Raimondo eliminating Chevron deference, significantly narrowed agency discretion to interpret civil rights statutes and shifted interpretive authority toward the judiciary. A Congressional Research Service report on gender and school sports similarly described Tennessee v. Cardona as part of a broader trend of litigation limiting federal agency efforts to protect transgender students under Title IX.

Civil rights advocates criticized the decision for undermining protections for LGBTQ+ students and survivors of sexual harassment, arguing that the 2024 rule would have restored more robust protections that had existed under prior guidance and addressed perceived shortcomings in the 2020 regulations. Some organizations representing survivors, including the Victim Rights Law Center, joined appeals seeking to preserve portions of the 2024 rule's harassment provisions. By contrast, officials from the plaintiff states and groups supporting the litigation praised the ruling as a victory for what they described as Title IX's "original meaning" and for maintaining sex-separated spaces and programs based on biological sex.

The decision created compliance uncertainty for schools, colleges, and universities that had begun preparing for the 2024 rule's implementation. Law firm advisories advised educational institutions to revert to policies aligned with the 2020 regulations while monitoring ongoing litigation and potential future rulemaking.

== See also ==
- Title IX of the Education Amendments of 1972
- Bostock v. Clayton County
- Loper Bright Enterprises v. Raimondo
- Transgender rights in the United States
- Davis v. Monroe County Board of Education
- Administrative Procedure Act
