= Franklin v. Gwinnett County Public Schools =

- Supreme Court of the United States

Argued December 11, 1991 Decided February 26, 1992
- Full case name: Franklin v. Gwinnett County Public Schools et al.
- Citations: 503 U.S. 60 (more) 112 S. Ct. 1028; 117 L. Ed. 2d 208
- Argument: Oral argument
- Decision: Opinion

Case history
- Prior: Dismissal affirmed, 911 F.2d 617 (11th Cir. 1990); cert. granted, 501 U.S. 1204 (1991).
- Subsequent: Remanded, 969 F.2d 1022 (11th Cir. 1992).

Holding
- A damages remedy is available for an action brought to enforce Title IX.

Court membership
- Chief Justice William Rehnquist Associate Justices Byron White · Harry Blackmun; John P. Stevens · Sandra Day O'Connor; Antonin Scalia · Anthony Kennedy; David Souter · Clarence Thomas

Case opinions
- Majority: White, joined by Blackmun, Stevens, O’Connor, Kennedy, Souter
- Concurrence: Scalia, joined by Rehnquist, Thomas

Laws applied
- Title IX

Franklin v. Gwinnett County Public Schools, 503 U.S. 60 (1992), is a United States Supreme Court Case in which the Court decided, in a unanimous vote, that monetary relief is available under Title IX of the Federal Education Amendments of 1972.

== Case background ==
The case arose when Christine Franklin, a sophomore at North Gwinnett High School in Georgia’s Gwinnett County Public School District claimed to be sexually abused by Andrew Hill, her teacher and a coach at the school. She also claimed that he had assaulted other students in her high school. The school district administrators became aware of the situation but decided not to take action and even encouraged Franklin to not proceed in pressing charges. However, Franklin persisted and the Gwinnett County Public Schools District eventually began to investigate the situation. Once investigations began, Andrew Hill resigned from his position at the school and the school board stopped its investigations. In result, Franklin decided to sue the Gwinnett School Board for violating the sexual harassment clause of Title IX for the goal of obtaining monetary relief and legal remedy.

While Title IX is most commonly associated with requiring equality among male and female sports, a major component of it describes how schools must deal with sexual harassment complaints. Title IX claims that, “discrimination on the basis of sex can include sexual harassment or sexual violence, such as rape, sexual assault, sexual battery, and sexual coercion.” When a student goes to a school with a sexual harassment complaint, title IX requires the school to respond “promptly and efficiently” and take “immediate action”. Franklin believed the school board did not follow these guidelines so she decided to sue in the attempt of getting money in return. Because the school board was on Hill’s side, they appealed and argued that one can not get monetary relief from Title IX.

In a unanimous 9—0 decision, the court ruled Franklin could get money because any and all types of relief, in appropriation, are available, in order to fix a violation of a federal right. After the ruling of the Supreme Court, the money was settled in an out-of-court settlement, of which the results were never disclosed.

== Court of Appeals ==
Franklin’s argument and the reason she pressed charges was that she believed the Gwinnett school board violated the rights established in Title IX, and she should thus be compensated for damages. The counter argument came from Hill and the entire Gwinnett school board. Their reasoning was that Title IX did not authorize monetary awards for damages which the district court and United States Court of Appeals for the Eleventh Circuit confirmed. Eventually, the case made its way to the Supreme Court on December 11, 1991. 79 days later, on February 26, 1992, the Supreme Court ruled unanimously in favor of Franklin where she was rewarded monetary benefits.

== Decision ==
A previous case Cannon v. University of Chicago (1979), established that Title IX was enforceable through an implied right of action, so the question became whether or not monetary awards were available for damages in a private action brought to enforce Title IX.

The court’s decision, written by Justice Byron R. White, stated that monetary relief was available under Title IX because it is presumed that violating a federal right calls for the use of appropriate relief as a remedy. The court also found that the harassment against Franklin was an example of discrimination based on sex. Since the court judged that because the sexual harassment against Franklin was a clear violation of Title IX, had the court not provided remedies for Franklin, Title IX would then be a law that would not award any remedies.

While the judges voted unanimously in favor of Franklin, three justices held a concurring opinion written by judge Antonin Scalia. Scalia believed that there should be limitations on the use of remedies because the causes of action were implied. The justices held this opinion under the belief that the application of remedies to expand private rights could lead to problems. Yet, despite this, they still voted in favor of Franklin.

== Significance ==
While this case confirmed that someone could receive monetary relief from Title IX, the reasoning behind the decision has a much wider application. They reasoned that since Title IX was a civil rights issue that all types of relief were available. Thus, they reaffirmed that all types of civil rights cases will allow and be open to all types of relief.
