= Alexander v. Sandoval =

- Supreme Court of the United States

Argued January 16, 2001 Decided April 24, 2001
- Full case name: James Alexander, Director, Alabama Department of Public Safety, et al., Petitioners v. Martha Sandoval, individually and on behalf of all others similarly situated
- Citations: 532 U.S. 275 (more) 121 S. Ct. 1511; 149 L. Ed. 2d 517; 2001 U.S. LEXIS 3367; 69 U.S.L.W. 4250; 80 Empl. Prac. Dec. (CCH) ¶ 40,456; 2001 Cal. Daily Op. Service 3194; 2001 Daily Journal DAR 3941; 2001 Colo. J. C.A.R. 2042; 14 Fla. L. Weekly Fed. S 206

Case history
- Prior: Sandoval v. Hagan, 7 F. Supp. 2d 1234 (M.D. Ala. 1998), aff'd, 197 F.3d 484 (11th Cir. 1999), cert. granted, 530 U.S. 1305 (2000).
- Subsequent: 268 F.3d 1065 (11th Cir. 2001).

Holding
- There is no private right of action to enforce disparate-impact regulations promulgated under Title VI of the Civil Rights Act of 1964.

Court membership
- Chief Justice William Rehnquist Associate Justices John P. Stevens · Sandra Day O'Connor; Antonin Scalia · Anthony Kennedy; David Souter · Clarence Thomas; Ruth Bader Ginsburg · Stephen Breyer

Case opinions
- Majority: Scalia, joined by Rehnquist, O'Connor, Kennedy, Thomas
- Dissent: Stevens, joined by Souter, Ginsburg, Breyer

Laws applied
- Title VI of the Civil Rights Act of 1964

Alexander v. Sandoval, 532 U.S. 275 (2001), was a Supreme Court of the United States decision that a regulation enacted under Title VI of the Civil Rights Act of 1964 did not include a private right of action to allow private lawsuits based on evidence of disparate impact.

== Background ==
In 1990, Alabama added an amendment to its state constitution to make English the state's official language. Thereafter, James Alexander, Director of the Alabama Department of Public Safety, ordered that the test for Alabama driver's license test to be given only in English.

Plaintiff Martha Sandoval sued Alexander and other defendants in the United States District Court for the Middle District of Alabama and claimed that the English-only test policy was discriminatory.

Sandoval sued under Title VI of the Civil Rights Act of 1964. Two sections of Title VI would prove important to her lawsuit. The first was section 601, which prohibits discrimination on the basis of "race, color, or national origin" by programs or agencies that receive federal funding, such as the Alabama Department of Public Safety. The other was section 602, which authorizes federal agencies "to effectuate the provisions of [section 601]... by issuing rules, regulations or orders of general applicability."

In her lawsuit, Sandoval invoked a regulation that the US Department of Justice had promulgated under section 602. The regulation prohibited agencies and programs receiving federal funding from taking actions that had a disparate impact on persons of a certain race, color, or nationality. She sought to enjoin Alabama's policy of giving the tests for driver's licenses in English only. She argued that the policy had a disparate impact on those born outside the United States because it denied non-English-speakers, who are disproportionately born outside the US, the opportunity to obtain driver's licenses.

The state defendants, however, argued that the regulation under which Sandoval was suing them did not include what is called an "implied private right of action," a cause of action not expressly created by a statute or regulation but one that a court has interpreted the statute or regulation to create implicitly.

The district court agreed with Sandoval that she had a private right of action and agreed that Alabama's policy was discriminatory under Title VI. The court therefore enjoined the policy.

The state defendants then appealed to United States Court of Appeals for the Eleventh Circuit. It first held that the regulation under which Sandoval sued allowed a private litigant to enforce its provisions and then affirmed the district court's ruling on the merits. The Supreme Court granted certiorari on "only the question [of] whether there [was] a private cause of action to enforce the regulation."

== Decision ==
The Court's opinion, written by Justice Scalia, began by describing the assumptions under which the Court would decide the case.

First of all, "it is clear" that section 601 of title VI contained an implied private right of action. The Court held that Cannon v. University of Chicago was controlling. Cannon held that Title IX of the Education Amendments of 1972, which is identical to Title VI but applies to gender-based discrimination, contained an implied private right of action. Under Cannon, section 601 of Title VI also contained a private right of action.

Then, the Court noted that "it is beyond dispute" and that "no party disagrees" that section 601 prohibits only intentional discrimination but does not prohibit activities with a disparate impact on certain races, colors, or nationalities.

Finally, the Court said it would assume for purposes of deciding the case that regulations promulgated under section 602 of Title VI may validly prohibit actions that have a disparate impact on certain races, colors, or national origins.

The Court then turned to the question that was at issue in the case: whether the disparate-impact regulation that Sandoval invoked created an implied private right of action. The Court rejected the argument, put forward both by Sandoval and by Justice Stevens's dissenting opinion, that because Cannon involved disparate impact, Cannon held that Title IX and, by extension Title VI, create a private right of action to enjoin policies that create a disparate impact. Both Sandoval and Justice Stevens relied on a footnote in Cannon, which stated that the effect of the policies that the Cannon plaintiff challenged was "to exclude women from consideration." The Court responded that Cannon was decided on the assumption that the University of Chicago had engaged in intentional discrimination, and hence the holding of case applied only to intentional discrimination. The Court asserted that "this Court is bound by holdings, not language." Therefore, from the majority's point of view, the holding of Cannon did not include the footnote.

The Court also rejected the argument that Guardians Association v. Civil Service Commission, a case the Court decided in 1983, dictated the outcome of Sandoval. The Court noted that although five Justices in Guardians had agreed that disparate-impact regulations promulgated under Title VI were valid, a majority of the Justices had not decided that those regulations were enforceable by private plaintiffs.

The Court then examined section 602, the section of Title VI under which the disparate-impact regulation was promulgated, to determine whether it created an implied private right of action. It began by noting that certain "rights-creating" language that was present in section 601 and Cannon relied on for its holding, was absent from section 602. The Court pointed out that section 602, by specifying that the federal government could cut off funding to a program which violated regulations, expressly provided for "one method of enforcing" those regulations. It concluded that this "express provision of one method" of enforcement "suggests that Congress intended to preclude others," such as a private right of action. It, therefore, held that Sandoval had no private right of action under the disparate-impact regulation.

== Dissent ==
In his dissent, Justice Stevens explained the Cannon decision as follows:

In providing a shorthand description of her claim in the text of the opinion, we ambiguously stated that she had alleged that she was denied admission "because she is a woman," but we appended a lengthy footnote setting forth the details of her disparate impact claim. Other than the shorthand description of her claim, there is not a word in the text of the opinion even suggesting that she had made the improbable allegation that the University of Chicago and Northwestern University had intentionally discriminated against women. In the context of the entire opinion (including both its analysis and its uncontested description of the facts of the case), that single ambiguous phrase provides no basis for limiting the case’s holding to incidents of intentional discrimination. If anything, the fact that the phrase "because she is a woman" encompasses both intentional and disparate impact claims should have made it clear that the reasoning in the opinion was equally applicable to both types of claims. In any event, the holding of the case certainly applied to the disparate impact claim that was described in detail in footnote 1 of the opinion.

His response to the majority's account of the relation between sections 601 and 602 was as follows:

Beyond its flawed structural analysis of Title VI and an evident antipathy toward implied rights of action, the majority offers little affirmative support for its conclusion that Congress did not intend to create a private remedy for violations of the Title VI regulations. The Court offers essentially two reasons for its position. First, it attaches significance to the fact that the "rights-creating" language in § 601 that defines the classes protected by the statute is not repeated in § 602. But, of course, there was no reason to put that language in § 602 because it is perfectly obvious that the regulations authorized by § 602 must be designed to protect precisely the same people protected by § 601. Moreover, it is self-evident that, linguistic niceties notwithstanding, any statutory provision whose stated purpose is to “effectuate” the eradication of racial and ethnic discrimination has as its "focus" those individuals who, absent such legislation, would be subject to discrimination. Second, the Court repeats the argument advanced and rejected in Cannon that the express provision of a fund cut-off remedy "suggests that Congress intended to preclude others."

== See also ==
- Implied cause of action
