= Education Amendments of 1972 =

U.S. civil rights law

- Long title: An Act to amend the Higher Education Act of 1965, the Vocational Education Act of 1963, the General Education Provisions Act (creating a National Foundation for Postsecondary Education and a National Institute of Education), the Elementary and Secondary Education Act of 1965, Public Law 874, Eighty-first Congress, and related Acts, and for other purposes.
- Enacted by: the 92nd United States Congress
- Effective: June 23, 1972

Citations
- Public law: 92-318
- Statutes at Large: 86 Stat. 235

Codification
- Acts amended: Higher Education Act of 1965; Vocational Education Act of 1963; General Education Provisions Act; Elementary and Secondary Education Act of 1965
- Titles amended: 20 U.S.C.: Education
- U.S.C. sections created: 20 U.S.C. ch. 38 § 1681 et seq.

Legislative history
- Introduced in the Senate as S. 659 by Birch Bayh (D–IN) on February 28, 1972; Committee consideration by House Subcommittee on Higher Education; Passed the Senate on March 1, 1972 (88-6); Passed the House on May 11, 1972 (275-125); Reported by the joint conference committee on May 24, 1972; agreed to by the Senate on May 24, 1972 (63-15) and by the House on June 8, 1972 (218-180); Signed into law by President Richard Nixon on June 23, 1972

Major amendments
- Civil Rights Restoration Act of 1987

United States Supreme Court cases
- Grove City College v. Bell (1984)

The Education Amendments of 1972, also sometimes known as the Higher Education Amendments of 1972 (Public No. 92‑318, 86 Stat. 235), were amendments to the Higher Education Act of 1965 and the Elementary and Secondary Education Act that were signed into law by President Richard Nixon on June 23, 1972. It is best known for its Title IX, which prohibited discrimination on the basis of sex in educational institutions receiving federal aid. It also modified government programs providing financial aid to students by directing money directly to students without the participation of intermediary financial institutions. Part D of Title III of the law enacted the Federal Supplemental Educational Opportunity Grants.

The Equal Pay Act of 1963 did not originally cover executives, administrators, outside salespeople, or professionals; the Education Amendments of 1972 amended the Fair Labor Standards Act to expand the coverage of the Equal Pay Act to these employees, by excluding the Equal Pay Act from the professional worker's exemption of the Fair Labor Standards Act.

== Bibliography ==
- James J. F. Forest (2002). Higher Education in the United States: An Encyclopedia. ABC-CLIO. p. 807. ISBN 978-1-57607-248-6.
