= Civil Rights Restoration Act of 1987 =

Law requiring federally funded institutions to comply with civil rights law

- Long title: An Act to restore the broad scope of coverage and to clarify the application of title IX of the Education Amendments of 1972, section 504 of the Rehabilitation Act of 1973, the Age Discrimination Act of 1975, and title VI of the Civil Rights Act of 1964
- Nicknames: Grove City Bill
- Enacted by: the 100th United States Congress

Citations
- Public law: Pub. L. 100–259
- Statutes at Large: 102 Stat. 28

Codification
- Acts amended: Civil Rights Act of 1964; Education Amendments of 1972; Rehabilitation Act of 1973; Age Discrimination Act of 1975

Legislative history
- Introduced in the Senate as S. 557 by Ted Kennedy (D–MA) on February 19, 1987; Committee consideration by Senate Labor and Human Resources; Passed the Senate on January 28, 1988 (75–14); Passed the House on March 2, 1988 (315–98); Vetoed by President Ronald Reagan on March 16, 1988; Overridden by the Senate on March 22, 1988 (73–24); Overridden by the House and became law on March 22, 1988 (292–133)

The Civil Rights Restoration Act of 1987, or Grove City Bill, is a United States legislative act that specifies that entities receiving federal funds must comply with civil rights legislation in all of their operations, not just in the program or activity that received the funding. The Act overturned the precedent set by the Supreme Court decision in Grove City College v. Bell, 465 U.S. 555 (1984), which held that only the particular program in an educational institution receiving federal financial assistance was required to comply with the anti-discrimination provisions of Title IX of the Education Amendments of 1972, not the institution as a whole.

== Background ==
The Act was proposed as a response to the Grove City College v. Bell Supreme Court decision in 1984. The decision held that only the particular program in an educational institution receiving federal financial assistance was required to comply with anti-discrimination provisions of Title IX. This decision created loopholes for educational institutions to continue discriminatory practices in other areas, which had a significant impact on minority communities, women, and people with disabilities.

== Legislative history ==
The Act was first passed by the House in June 1984 (375–32) but stalled for several years after divisions over its potential effects on Title IX regulations prohibiting discrimination relating to abortion impeded the effectiveness of a civil rights coalition. In January 1988, the Senate accepted an amendment by Senator John Danforth (R-MO). He is described as "abortion neutral" and clarified that the Act does not impose a requirement for entities receiving federal funding to pay or provide for abortions and that it prohibits discrimination against women who use or seek abortion services. The amendment was opposed by the National Organization for Women and other pro-choice groups but ultimately resulted in passage of the bill in both the House and the Senate.

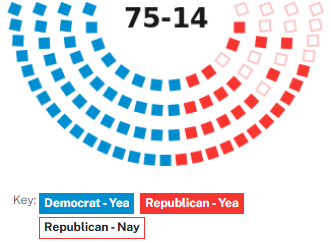
The vote breakdown in the US Senate by party of The Civil Rights Act of 1987.

The US Senate brought S. 557 on January 28, 1988 for a floor vote. The act was passed 75–14. The Senate Democratic Caucus voted unanimously, 48 in favor with 6 not voting. The Senate Republican Conference voted 27 in favor, 14 against, with 4 not voting.

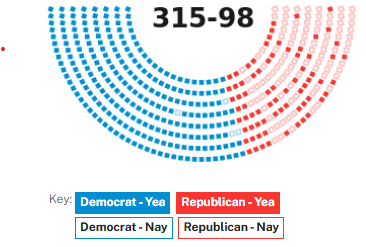
The vote breakdown in the US House by party of The Civil Rights Act of 1987.

The Act then passed to the House of Representatives for a final vote on March 2, 1988, where it passed 315–98. The House Democratic Caucus voted nearly unanimously, with 242 in favor, 4 against, and 10 not voting. The House Republican Conference voted 73 in favor, 94 against, with 10 members not voting.

On March 16, 1988, President Ronald Reagan vetoed the bill by arguing that the Act represented an overexpansion of governmental power over private organizational decision-making and "would diminish substantially the freedom and independence of religious institutions in our society." On March 22, 1988, the Senate overrode Reagan's veto by a vote of 73–24 (52–0 in the Senate Democratic Caucus and 21–24 in the Senate Republican Conference) with 3 members voting present or abstaining. On the same day, the House voted in favor of the bill with a vote of 292–133 (240–10 in the House Democratic Caucus and 52–123 in the House Republican Conference), with 7 members voting present or abstaining. Reagan's veto was the first veto of a civil rights act since Andrew Johnson vetoed the Civil Rights Act of 1866.

== Provisions ==
In addition to Title IX of the Education Amendments of 1972 (which prohibits sex discrimination in educational institutions), the Act applies to the Rehabilitation Act of 1973 (which prohibits discrimination on the basis of disability), Title VI of the Civil Rights Act of 1964 (which prohibits racial discrimination), and the Age Discrimination in Employment Act of 1967 (which prohibits age discrimination in employment).

With the passage of the act, educational institutions receiving any federal funding were required to comply with all federal civil rights laws, including those relating to gender, race, and disability, throughout the institution (not only in the parts of the institution receiving the funding). The act also extended protection against discrimination in educational institutions to a wider range of individuals, including students, faculty, and staff.
