= Davis v. Monroe County Board of Education =

- Supreme Court of the United States

Argued January 12, 1999 Decided May 24, 1999
- Full case name: Aurelia Davis, as next friend of LaShonda D., Petitioner v. Monroe County Board of Education, et al.
- Docket no.: 97-843
- Citations: 23 U.S. 428 (more)

Holding
- Schools may be held liable under Title IX for student-on-student sexual misconduct if the school exhibits deliberate indifference.

Court membership
- Chief Justice William Rehnquist Associate Justices John P. Stevens · Sandra Day O'Connor; Antonin Scalia · Anthony Kennedy; David Souter · Clarence Thomas; Ruth Bader Ginsburg · Stephen Breyer

Case opinions
- Majority: O'Connor, joined by Stevens, Souter, Ginsburg, Breyer
- Dissent: Kennedy, joined by Rehnquist, Scalia, Thomas

Laws applied
- Title IX

Davis v. Monroe County Board of Education, 526 U.S. 629 (1999), was a Supreme Court case that began when Aurelia Davis, mother of LaShonda Davis, sued the Monroe County Board of Education on behalf of her daughter, alleging that the faculty and school officials failed to protect and prevent LaShonda's suffering from being sexually harassed by a fellow fifth grade student. Davis claimed that due to the harassment and environment that the school created for her daughter, the school’s indifference to her daughter violated Title IX of the Education Amendments of 1972. In a 5-to-4 decision on May 24, 1999, the Supreme Court reversed the dismissal that the Court of Appeals for the Eleventh Circuit decided on when Aurelia Davis first petitioned for her daughter. This decision recognizes that schools may be held liable under Title IX for student-on-student sexual misconduct.

== Background ==
Originally, in 1994, Aurelia Davis filed suit against the Monroe County school board and the school officials, seeking damages for the sexual harassment that her daughter, LaShonda Davis, suffered from a fifth-grade classmate at Hubbard Elementary School. Davis stated that her daughter began to be sexually harassed in the beginning of December 1992 until mid-May 1993. The male classmate, identified as G.F., was then charged and pleaded guilty to sexual battery, reporting the actions that the student attempted to touch LaShonda’s genital area, breasts and made vulgar statements.

According to LaShonda and her mother, she reported each incident to her mother and various other school teachers, along with the principal. However, despite the reports, no action was taken against her classmate for the actions against LaShonda and other female students. On May 4, 1994, Davis filed against the Monroe County Board of Education, the board superintendent and Hubbard Elementary School’s principal, Bill Querry. The complaint alleged that the deliberate indifference towards her daughter created an intimidating and hostile environment for her daughter, leading her daughter to suffer injuries such as a decline in her grades and feelings of suicidality. The Georgia District Court dismissed the claims that LaShonda’s mother made on the grounds that Title IX provided no basis for liability against the school and employees.

In 1996, the Eleventh Circuit Court of Appeals ruled that school employees must commit the harassment to state a valid sexual harassment claim under Title IX. Then, in 1998, the court reversed its previous 1996 decision and held that Title IX could not hold schools liable for student-on-student sexual harassment.

The case was then argued to the Supreme Court on January 12, 1999, with Verna L. Williams representing the Davis’ on behalf of the National Women's Law Center. Barbara D. Underwood, part of the Department of Justice for the United States, also advocated for the petitioners as amicus curiae. W.Warren Plowden Jr. advocated for the respondents, the Monroe County Board of Education. On May 24, 1999 the Supreme Court decided in the Rehnquist Court that a school district could be held liable under Title IX for student-on student harassment if the board acts with deliberate indifference to known acts of harassment.

== Opinions of the Supreme Court ==
With a 5-to-4 decision of the Supreme Court, the court held that a school district may be liable for damages under Title IX if there is deliberate indifference for student-on-student harassment. The opinion of the Court was delivered by Justice O'Connor, stating that the Eleventh Circuit erred in dismissing Davis's complaint and that there would be further proceeding that was consistent with their opinion. The majority opinion was joined by John Stevens, David Souter, Stephen Breyer and Ruth Bader Ginsburg.

The dissenting opinion, delivered by Justice Kennedy, was joined by Justices Rehquist, Scalia, and Thomas. The dissent argued that decisions should best be made by parents, teachers and school administrations, not by the Court.

== Public opinions ==
Opinions of Davis' case varied in the public eye. While the Clinton administration sided with the Davis family's case, and were pleased with the ruling, others were dismayed by the decision. The large question that the dissenting participants and public asked was how would one draw the line between harassment, that amounted to sex discrimination and harassment, and the typical teasing and flirting in the school yard. Some believed that it made little sense to apply workplace sexual harassment standards, and the standards applied to colleges and universities, to schools and their schoolchildren. Opinions that supported the Davis family emphasized how the issue of sexual harassment in the classroom was becoming a prominent issue. The prominent idea in the supporting opinions were that schoolchildren should be entitled to be protected from this misconduct, the same as their teachers are.

== Importance of case ==
Due to this case, the Supreme Court reversed and remanded the lower court, stating that the court improperly dismissed the plaintiff, Aurelia Davis’, lawsuit against the Monroe County Board of Education. The court also held that a school board may be held liable for student-on-student harassment if the board acts with deliberate indifference towards the claims that are made. The court defined that peer-on-peer harassment in educational contexts undermines the victims educational experience and should not be denied equal access to an institutions resources and opportunities. By agreeing with Davis, Title IX reaches sexual harassment even when committed by other students and when schools become aware of this misconduct occurring, it imposes a duty on these schools.

== See also ==
- 37 Words: Title IX and fifty years of fighting sex discrimination written by Sherry Boschert https://www.amherst.edu/alumni/learn/amherstreads/allbooks/node/817861
- Sexual harassment in education in the United States
