= Cort v. Ash =

- Supreme Court of the United States

Argued March 18, 1975 Decided June 17, 1975
- Full case name: Cort, et al. v. Ash
- Citations: 422 U.S. 66 (more) 95 S. Ct. 2080; 45 L. Ed. 2d 26; 1975 U.S. LEXIS 143

Case history
- Prior: On writ of certiorari from the United States Court of Appeals for the Third Circuit

Holding
- 18 U.S.C. § 610 does not create a private cause of action.

Court membership
- Chief Justice Warren E. Burger Associate Justices William O. Douglas · William J. Brennan Jr. Potter Stewart · Byron White; Thurgood Marshall · Harry Blackmun; Lewis F. Powell Jr. · William Rehnquist

Case opinion
- Majority: Brennan, joined by unanimous

Laws applied
- 18 U.S.C. § 610

Cort v. Ash, 422 U.S. 66 (1975), was a case in which Justice William J. Brennan writing for a unanimous United States Supreme Court articulated a four factor test for federal courts to apply when deciding whether the implication doctrine allows a cause of action to be inferred from a federal statute that does not clearly state a civil remedy.

The Cort criteria were applied by some lower federal courts as a restrictive standard to test applications of the implication doctrine, including a 7th Circuit decision, later reversed by the Supreme Court, which held no private right of action exists under Title IX to challenge a denial of admission to medical school as gender-based discrimination.

== Background ==
Defendant/petitioner Stewart S. Cort, chairman of the board of directors of Bethlehem Steel Corporation, published a series of political advertisements in nineteen local newspapers where the company had plants, as well as several national publications (including Time, Newsweek, and U.S. News & World Report). The advertisements were in support of the business community, asserting that an allegation (supposedly made by 1972 Presidential candidate George McGovern) that big business was not paying its fair share of taxes was untrue, and suggesting that people mobilize "truth squads" to spread this idea. The funding for these ads came from Bethlehem's general corporate funds.

The plaintiff/respondent was a shareholder of Bethlehem, and a qualified voter. He sued in the United States District Court for the Eastern District of Pennsylvania, on behalf of both himself and the corporation (a derivative suit). He sued under both 18 U.S.C. § 610 (a criminal statute forbidding corporations from making contributions or expenditures in connection with Presidential elections repealed by the 1976 amendments to the Federal Election Campaign Act), and the corporate law of the state of Delaware. He then amended his complaint to drop the state law claim, after he declined to post $35,000 in security for expenses in order to proceed with the claim.

The District Court held that the criminal penalties of the federal statute did not include any private cause of action, and granted summary judgment for the defendant. The plaintiff appealed. The United States Court of Appeals for the Third Circuit reversed, holding that "a private cause of action, whether brought by a citizen to secure injunctive relief or by a stockholder to secure injunctive or derivative damage relief is proper to remedy a violation of §610".

The case was appealed again to the Supreme Court, which took the case to answer this question: "Could the court properly assume a private cause of action for damages against corporate directors under 18 U.S.C. § 610?"

== Decision ==
William J. Brennan wrote for a unanimous Court. He found that because § 610 was a criminal statute, and because at the time suit was filed, there was no provision for civil enforcement of the statute, there was no need to imply a private cause of action.

Furthermore, a statute enacted in 1974 amended the Federal Election Campaign Act to create the Federal Election Commission, which was granted primary jurisdiction over such complaints. Because of this intervening law, the Court chose to apply the law which was in effect at the time the case was commenced. It comes from United States v. Schooner Peggy (1801) and was reaffirmed in Bradley v. Richmond School Board (1974).

Brennan also laid out four factors for determining when a cause of action should be implied from a statute:

1. Is the plaintiff within the class for whose benefit the statute was enacted (i.e., does the statute create a federal right in the plaintiff's favor)?
2. Is there any indication of legislative intent, explicit or implicit, either to create or deny a cause of action?
3. Is it consistent with the underlying purposes of legislative scheme to imply such a remedy for the plaintiff?
4. Is the cause of action one traditionally relegated to state law, in an area specifically of concern to the states, so that it would be inappropriate to infer a cause of action based solely on federal law?

422 U.S. at 78.

Here, the Court found that there was no legislative indication that private cause of action was intended by Congress, or that the plaintiffs in this action were within the class sought to be benefited by the statute. Brennan commented that the intent to protect corporate shareholders "was at best a subsidiary purpose" of the statute. 422 U.S. at 80. He also found that implying a cause of action was inconsistent with the statute's purpose, and that the plaintiff had a remedy under state corporate law. Thus, the Third Circuit's decision was overturned.
