= Grove City College v. Bell =

- Supreme Court of the United States

Argued November 29, 1983 Decided February 28, 1984
- Full case name: Grove City College, et al. v. Terrel Bell, Secretary of Education
- Citations: 465 U.S. 555 (more) 104 S. Ct. 1211; 79 L. Ed. 2d 516; 1984 U.S. LEXIS 158

Case history
- Prior: 687 F.2d 684 (3d Cir. 1982)

Holding
- Title IX, which applies only to educational institutions that receive federal funds, could be applied to a private school that refused direct federal funding but for which a large number of students had received federally-funded scholarships.

Court membership
- Chief Justice Warren E. Burger Associate Justices William J. Brennan Jr. · Byron White; Thurgood Marshall · Harry Blackmun; Lewis F. Powell Jr. · William Rehnquist; John P. Stevens · Sandra Day O'Connor

Case opinions
- Majority: White, joined by a unanimous court (Parts I, II, IV, V); Burger, Blackmun, Powell, Rehnquist, O'Connor (Part III)
- Concurrence: Powell, joined by Burger, O'Connor
- Concurrence: Stevens
- Concur/dissent: Brennan, joined by Marshall
- Abrogated by
- Civil Rights Restoration Act of 1987, Pub. L. No. 100-259, 102 Stat. 28 (1988) (in part)

Grove City College v. Bell, 465 U.S. 555 (1984), was a case in which the United States Supreme Court held that Title IX, which applies only to colleges and universities that receive federal funds, could be applied to a private school that refused direct federal funding but for which a large number of students had received federally funded scholarships. The Court also held that the federal government could require a statutorily mandated "assurance of compliance" with Title IX even though no evidence had been presented to suggest that Grove City College had discriminated. However, the Court also held that the regulation would apply only to the institution's financial aid department, not to the school as a whole.

== Opinion of the court ==
Justice Byron White delivered the opinion of the Court, which was unanimous except for Part III.

In an opinion by White, joined by Chief Justice Warren Burger and Harry Blackmun, Lewis Powell, William Rehnquist, and Sandra Day O'Connor, it was held that (1) Title IX applied to the college, even though it accepted no direct assistance, since it did enroll students who received BEOGs, (2) for Title IX enforcement purposes, the education program or activity at the college receiving federal financial assistance was the college's financial aid program, and not the entire college, (3) federal assistance to the college's financial aid program could be terminated solely because the college had refused to execute an assurance of compliance with Title IX, and (4) the application of Title IX to the college did not infringe the First Amendment rights of the college or its students.

=== Concurring and dissenting opinions ===
Lewis Franklin Powell Jr. joined by Chief Justice Warren Burger and Sandra Day O'Connor, concurred, expressing the view that the above holdings were dictated by the language and legislative history of Title IX and the regulations of the Department of Education.

John Paul Stevens concurred in part and concurred in the result, stating that he was unable to join in holding 2 above because he considered it an advisory opinion unnecessary to the overall decision and because it was predicated on speculation rather than evidence.

William Brennan joined by Thurgood Marshall concurred in part and dissented in part, expressing the view that the program-specific language in Title IX was designed to insure that the reach of the statute is dependent upon the scope of federal financial assistance provided to the college, so that when the financial assistance is clearly intended to serve as federal aid for the entire college, the college as a whole should be covered by the prohibition on sex discrimination.

== Legacy ==
=== Effect on plaintiffs ===
The effect of the court decision on Grove City College was limited. Grove City modified its admission policies by refusing to sign any Federal government forms, and replacing federal assistance to students with private aid. The college chose to not admit students who took federal aid.

=== Abrogation of decision ===
In 1987, the holding that compliance with Title IX was necessary only in the particular programs or activities that receive federal funding was abrogated when the United States Congress subsequently passed the Civil Rights Restoration Act of 1987, which specified that recipients of federal funds must comply with civil rights laws in all areas.

== See also ==
- List of United States Supreme Court cases, volume 465
- Civil Rights Restoration Act of 1987
