= Cannon v. University of Chicago =

- Supreme Court of the United States

Argued January 9, 1979 Decided May 14, 1979
- Full case name: Geraldine G. Cannon v. University of Chicago, et al.
- Citations: 441 U.S. 677 (more) 99 S. Ct. 1946; 60 L. Ed. 2d 560; 1979 U.S. LEXIS 36; 19 Empl. Prac. Dec. (CCH) ¶ 9202

Case history
- Prior: 406 F. Supp. 1257 (N.D. Ill.), aff'd, 559 F.2d 1063 (7th Cir. 1976), cert. granted, 438 U.S. 914 (1978)
- Subsequent: On remand to 605 F.2d 560 (7th Cir. 1979), appeal after remand, 648 F.2d 1104 (7th Cir.), mandamus denied sub nom., In re Cannon, 454 U.S. 811, cert. denied, 454 U.S. 1128 (1981), cert. denied, 460 U.S. 1013 (1983).

Holding
- Title IX of the Higher Education Act contains an implied private cause of action.

Court membership
- Chief Justice Warren E. Burger Associate Justices William J. Brennan Jr. · Potter Stewart; Byron White · Thurgood Marshall; Harry Blackmun · Lewis F. Powell Jr. William Rehnquist · John P. Stevens

Case opinions
- Majority: Stevens, joined by Brennan, Stewart, Marshall, Rehnquist
- Concurrence: Burger
- Concurrence: Rehnquist, joined by Stewart
- Dissent: White, joined by Blackmun
- Dissent: Powell

Laws applied
- 20 U.S.C. §§ 1681–1683

Cannon v. University of Chicago, 441 U.S. 677 (1979), was a United States Supreme Court case which interpreted Congressional silence in the face of earlier interpretations of similar laws to determine that Title IX of the Higher Education Act provides an implied cause of action.

== Facts ==
Plaintiff Geraldine Cannon sued the University of Chicago, asserting that she was denied admission on the basis of her sex, and that she had a cause of action under Title IX, which bars sex discrimination by federally funded institutions, but does not expressly grant a private right of action. The United States District Court for the Northern District of Illinois dismissed the case. The dismissal was affirmed by the United States Court of Appeals for the Seventh Circuit, which held that the statutory procedure for termination of federal funds was the exclusive remedy provided by Congress.

One issue, buried in footnotes, would be of importance in the subsequent Alexander v. Sandoval decision. The University of Chicago claimed that Cannon was denied admission because the medical university admissions departments had a policy of not admitting applicants over thirty years of age, at least not without an advanced degree. Northwestern Medical School absolutely disqualified applicants over 35. Cannon was 39 years old at the time. The policy had a disparate impact on women.

The plaintiff appealed, contending that Congress acted in light of similar language in Title VI of the Civil Rights Act of 1964, which the Supreme Court had already found to imply a private remedy, and to which Congress had allowed attorney fees (which would be unnecessary absent a private right of action).

== Issue ==
Did Congress intend a private remedy to be implied from the Title IX? Are individuals allowed to sue under Title IX, or are they only allowed to participate in class-action suits by the HEW?

== Holding ==
The Court, in an opinion by Justice Stevens, applied the four-part test set forth in Cort v. Ash, 422 U.S. 66 (1975), used in order to determine whether Congress had meant for a law to be able to be privately enforced:

1. Is the plaintiff a member of a special class for whose benefit the statute was enacted? (The court notes that this can not be used to imply a right of action that is merely a criminal statute that prohibits all persons from engaging in a general prohibited behavior).
2. Does legislative history express a legislative intent to create or deny a private right of action?
3. Would creation of a private right of action frustrate legislative scheme, or is it in fact helpful to it?
4. Does the right involve an area that historically has basically been of concern to the States?

The court determined that all of the Cort factors pointed to an implied right of action:

1. Women are clearly in the special class protected by the statute, for the statute identifies persons who shall not be excluded.
2. Title IX contained language which copied that of Title VI, for which a private cause of action had already been implied by the Fifth Circuit at the time Title IX was adopted; this was held to show legislative intent.
3. The remedy was necessary, or at least helpful to accomplishing one of Congress’ two purposes: avoiding federal support for discriminators and protecting individual citizens from discrimination. Private suits make this second purpose easier to implement.
4. This question is not left to states because the federal government is primarily responsible for protecting against discrimination.

The Court also recognized that while this new source of financial liability might affect universities badly, it was up to Congress to weigh that concern.

== Dissent ==
A dissenting opinion by Justice Powell raised separation of powers concerns. He called the Court's decision legislation, noting that Congress knew how to make judicial remedies, and saying that three of the four factors invited judicial lawmaking—only the second factor, he argued, was really about congressional intent. Powell contended that the Court's decision would encourage Congress to be lax in their duty to create laws, expecting democratically unaccountable judges to do the job for them.

== See also ==
- List of United States Supreme Court cases, volume 441
