= Title IX =

US federal law prohibiting sex discrimination in education

- Long title: An Act to amend the Higher Education Act of 1965, the Vocational Education Act of 1963, the General Education Provisions Act (creating a National Foundation for Postsecondary Education and a National Institute of Education), the Elementary and Secondary Education Act of 1965, Public Law 874, Eighty-first Congress, and related Acts, and for other purposes.
- Nicknames: Education Amendments of 1972
- Enacted by: the 92nd United States Congress
- Effective: June 23, 1972

Citations
- Public law: 92-318
- Statutes at Large: 86 Stat. 235

Codification
- Acts amended: Higher Education Act of 1965; Vocational Education Act of 1963; General Education Provisions Act; Elementary and Secondary Education Act of 1965
- Titles amended: 20 U.S.C.: Education
- U.S.C. sections created: 20 U.S.C. ch. 38 § 1681 et seq.

Legislative history
- Introduced in the Senate as S. 659 by Birch Bayh (D–IN) on February 28, 1972; Committee consideration by House Subcommittee on Higher Education; Passed the Senate on March 1, 1972 (88–6); Passed the House on May 11, 1972 (275–125); Reported by the joint conference committee on May 24, 1972; agreed to by the Senate on May 24, 1972 (63–15) and by the House on June 8, 1972 (218–180); Signed into law by President Richard Nixon on June 23, 1972

United States Supreme Court cases
- Cannon v. University of Chicago, 441 U.S. 677 (1979); North Haven Bd. of Ed. v. Bell, 456 U.S. 512 (1982); Mississippi University for Women v. Hogan, 458 U.S. 718 (1982); Iron Arrow Honor Soc. v. Heckler, 464 U.S. 67 (1983); Grove City College v. Bell, 465 U.S. 555 (1984); Franklin v. Gwinnett County Public Schools, 503 U.S. 60 (1992); Gebser v. Lago Vista Independent School District, 524 U.S. 274 (1998); NCAA v. Smith, 525 U.S. 459 (1999); Davis v. Monroe County Board of Education, 526 U.S. 629 (1999); Jackson v. Birmingham Board of Education, 544 U.S. 167 (2005); Fitzgerald v. Barnstable School Committee, 555 U.S. 246 (2009); West Virginia v. B. P. J., No. 24-43, 609 U.S. ___ (2027); Crowther v. Board of Regents of the University System of Georgia, No. 25-183, ___ U.S. ___ (2027)

Title IX is a landmark federal civil rights law in the United States that was enacted as part (Title IX) of the Education Amendments of 1972. It prohibits sex-based discrimination in any school or any other education program that receives funding from the federal government. This is Public Law No. 92‑318, 86 Stat. 235 (June 23, 1972), codified at 20 U.S.C. §§ 1681–1688.

Senator Birch Bayh wrote the 37 opening words of Title IX. Bayh first introduced an amendment to the Higher Education Act to ban discrimination on the basis of sex on August 6, 1971, and again on February 28, 1972, when it passed the Senate. Representative Edith Green, chair of the Subcommittee on Education, had held hearings on discrimination against women, and introduced legislation in the House on May 11, 1972. The full Congress passed Title IX on June 8, 1972. Representative Patsy Mink emerged in the House to lead efforts to protect Title IX against attempts to weaken it, and it was later renamed the Patsy T. Mink Equal Opportunity in Education Act following Mink's death in 2002. When Title IX was passed in 1972, 42 percent of the students enrolled in American colleges were female.

The purpose of Title IX of the Educational Amendments of 1972 was to update Title VII of the Civil Rights Act of 1964, which banned several forms of discrimination in employment, but did not address or mention discrimination in education.

== Text ==
The following is the opening of the text of Title IX, which is followed by several exceptions and clarifications:

No person in the United States shall, on the basis of sex, be excluded from participation in, be denied the benefits of, or be subjected to discrimination under any education program or activity receiving Federal financial assistance.

== Historical background ==
=== Foundations and hearings ===
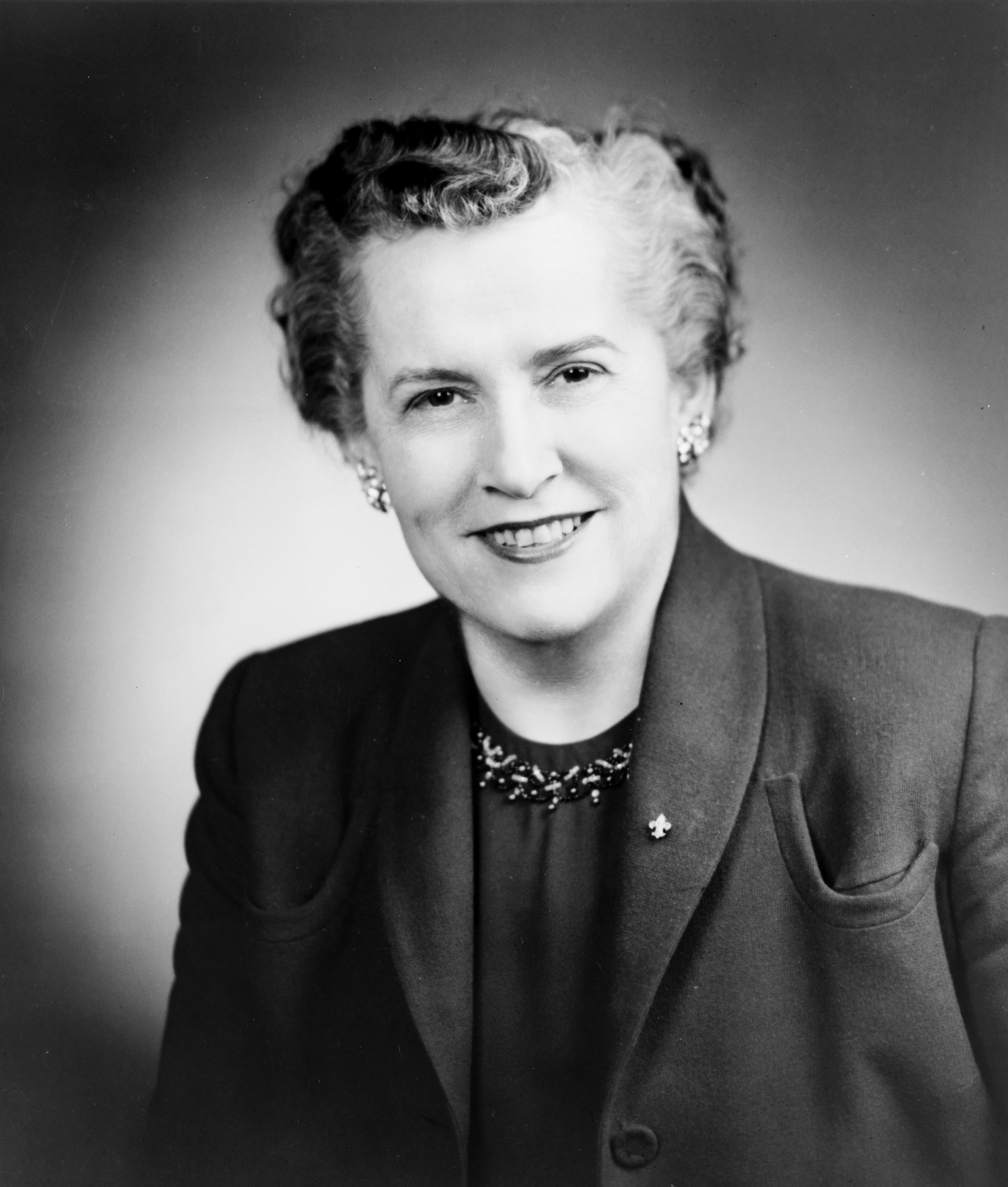
Rep. Edith Green of Oregon laid the foundation for Title IX.

Title IX was enacted as a follow-up to the passage of the Civil Rights Act of 1964. The 1964 Act was passed to end discrimination in various fields based on race, color, religion, sex, or national origin in the areas of employment and public accommodation. The 1964 Act did not prohibit sex discrimination against people employed at educational institutions. A parallel law, Title VI, had also been enacted in 1964 to prohibit discrimination in federally funded private and public entities. It covered race, color, and national origin but excluded sex. Feminists during the early 1970s lobbied Congress to add sex as a protected class category. Title IX was enacted to fill this gap and prohibit discrimination in all federally funded education programs. Congressman John Tower then proposed an amendment to Title IX that would have exempted "revenue-generating" sports from Title IX.

The Tower Amendment was rejected, but it led to widespread misunderstanding of Title IX as a sports-equity law, rather than an anti-discrimination, civil rights law. While Title IX is best known for its impact on high school and collegiate athletics, the original statute made no explicit mention of sports. The United States Supreme Court also issued decisions in the 1980s and 1990s, making clear that sexual harassment and assault is a form of sex discrimination. In 2011, President Barack Obama issued guidance reminding schools of their obligation to redress sexual assaults as civil rights matters under Title IX. Obama also issued guidance clarifying Title IX protections for LGBT students through Dear Colleague letters.

The precursor to Title IX was an executive order, issued in 1967 by President Lyndon Johnson, forbidding discrimination in federal contracts. Before these orders were issued, the National Organization for Women (NOW) had persuaded him to include the addition of women. Executive Order 11375 required all entities receiving federal contracts to end discrimination on the basis of sex in hiring and employment. In 1969, a notable example of its success was Bernice Sandler, who used the executive order to retain her job and tenure at the University of Maryland. She used university statistics to show how female employment at the university had plummeted as qualified women were replaced by men. Sandler then brought her complaints to the Department of Labor's Office for Federal Fair Contracts Compliance, where she was encouraged to file a formal complaint; later citing inequalities in pay, rank, and admissions, among others.

Sandler soon began to file complaints against the University of Maryland and other colleges while working with NOW and the Women's Equity Action League (WEAL). Sandler later filed 269 complaints against colleges and universities, which led to the events of 1970. In 1970, Sandler joined U.S. House Representative Edith Green's Subcommittee on Higher Education of the Education and Labor Committee, and observed corresponding congressional hearings relating to women's issues on employment and equal opportunity. In these hearings, Green and Sandler initially proposed the idea of Title IX. An early legislative draft aimed at amending the Civil Rights Act of 1964 was then authored by Representative Green. At the hearing, there were mentions of athletics. The idea behind the draft was a progressive one in instituting an affirmative action for women in all aspects of American education.

=== Steps from a draft to legislative act to public law ===
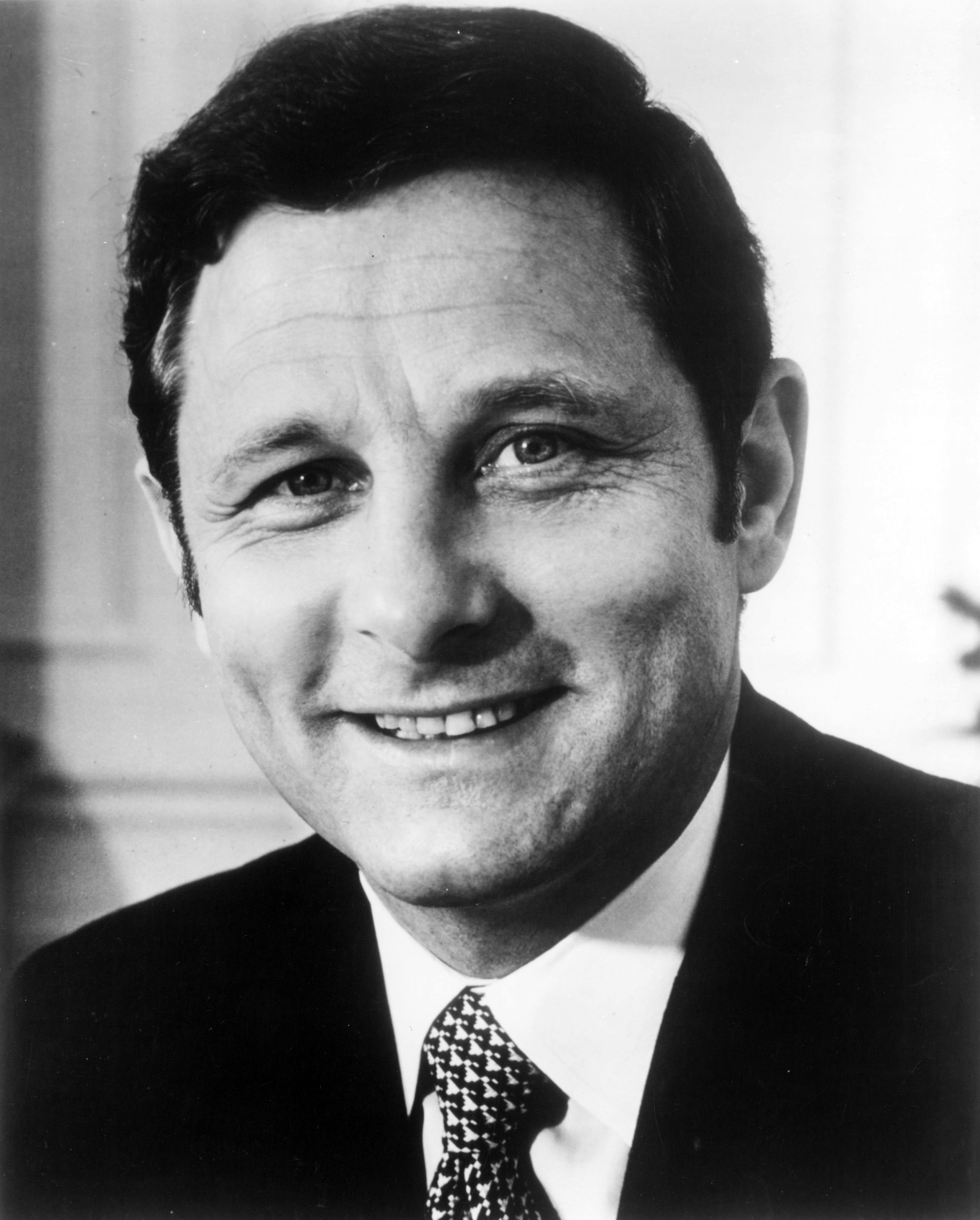
Senator Birch Bayh of Indiana

Title IX was formally introduced in Congress by Senator Birch Bayh of Indiana in 1971, who then was its chief Senate sponsor for congressional debate. At the time, Bayh was working on numerous constitutional issues related to women's employment and sex discrimination—including, but not limited to, the revised draft of the Equal Rights Amendment. The ERA attempted to build "a powerful constitutional base from which to move forward in abolishing discriminatory differential treatment based on sex". As Bayh was having partisan difficulty in later getting the ERA Amendment out of committee, the Higher Education Act of 1965 was on the Senate Floor for re-authorization; and on February 28, 1972, Bayh re-introduced a provision found in the original/revised ERA bill as an amendment which would become Title IX. In his remarks on the Senate Floor, Bayh stated, "we are all familiar with the stereotype [that] women [are] pretty things who go to college to find a husband, [and who] go on to graduate school because they want a more interesting husband, and finally marry, have children, and never work again. The desire of many schools not to waste a 'man's place' on a woman stems from such stereotyped notions. But the facts contradict these myths about the 'weaker sex' and it is time to change our operating assumptions." He continued: "While the impact of this amendment would be far-reaching, it is not a panacea. It is, however, an important first step in the effort to provide for the women of America something that is rightfully theirs—an equal chance to attend the schools of their choice, to develop the skills they want, and to apply those skills with the knowledge that they will have a fair chance to secure the jobs of their choice with equal pay for equal work". Title IX became public law on June 23, 1972. When U.S. President Nixon signed the bill, he spoke mostly about desegregation busing, and did not mention the expansion of educational access for women he had enacted.

=== Implementation ===
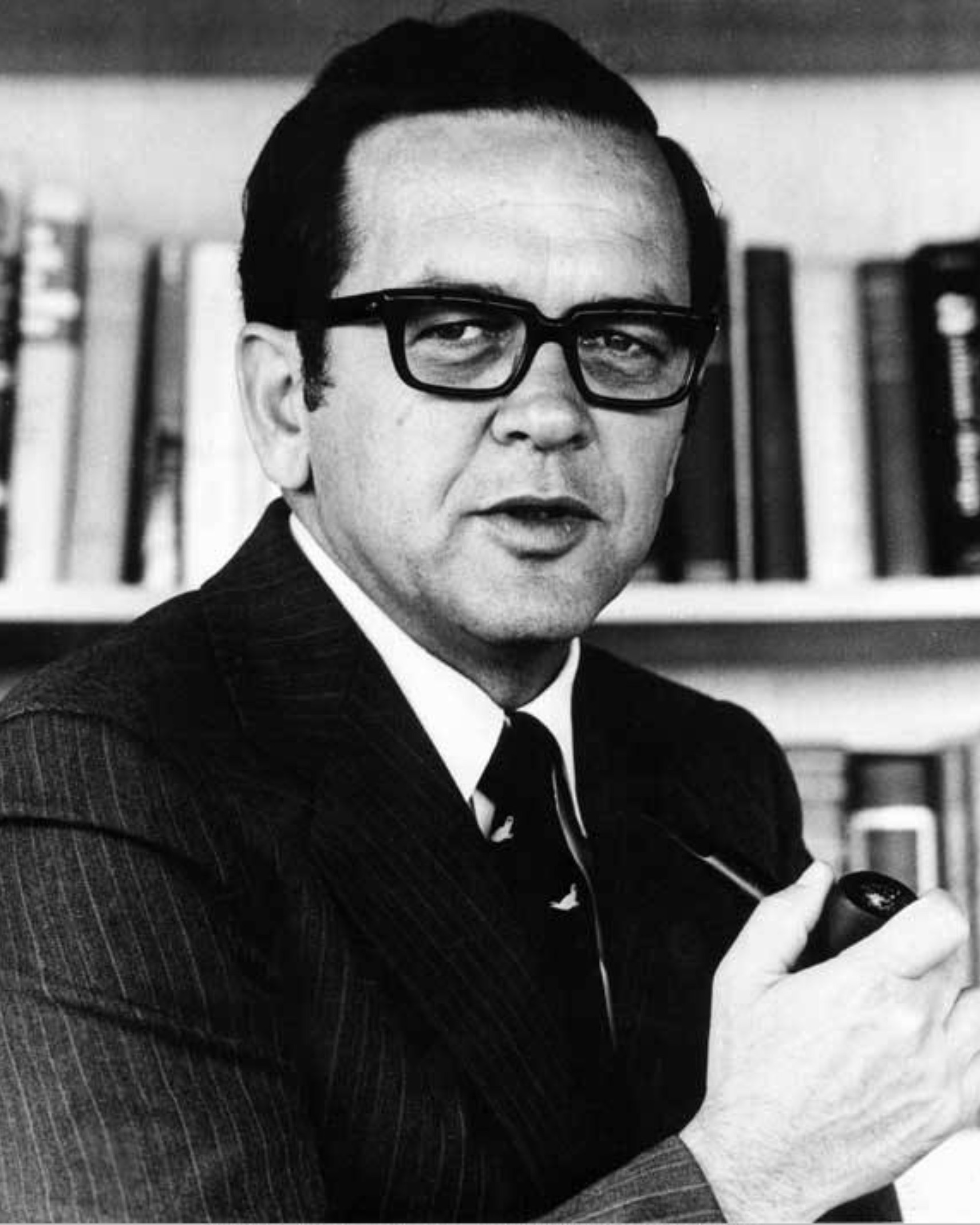
Senator Ted Stevens of Alaska, the "Father of Title IX"

Each institution or organization that receives federal funding must designate at least one employee as Title IX coordinator. Their duty is to oversee that Title IX is not being violated and to answer all questions pertaining to Title IX. Everyone must have access to the Title IX coordinator's name, address, and telephone number. To ensure compliance with Title IX, programs of both males and females must display no discrimination. This applies to opportunities for athletic participation (in proportion to enrollment numbers), scholarships, and how athletes are treated (e.g., equitable locker room facilities, etc.).

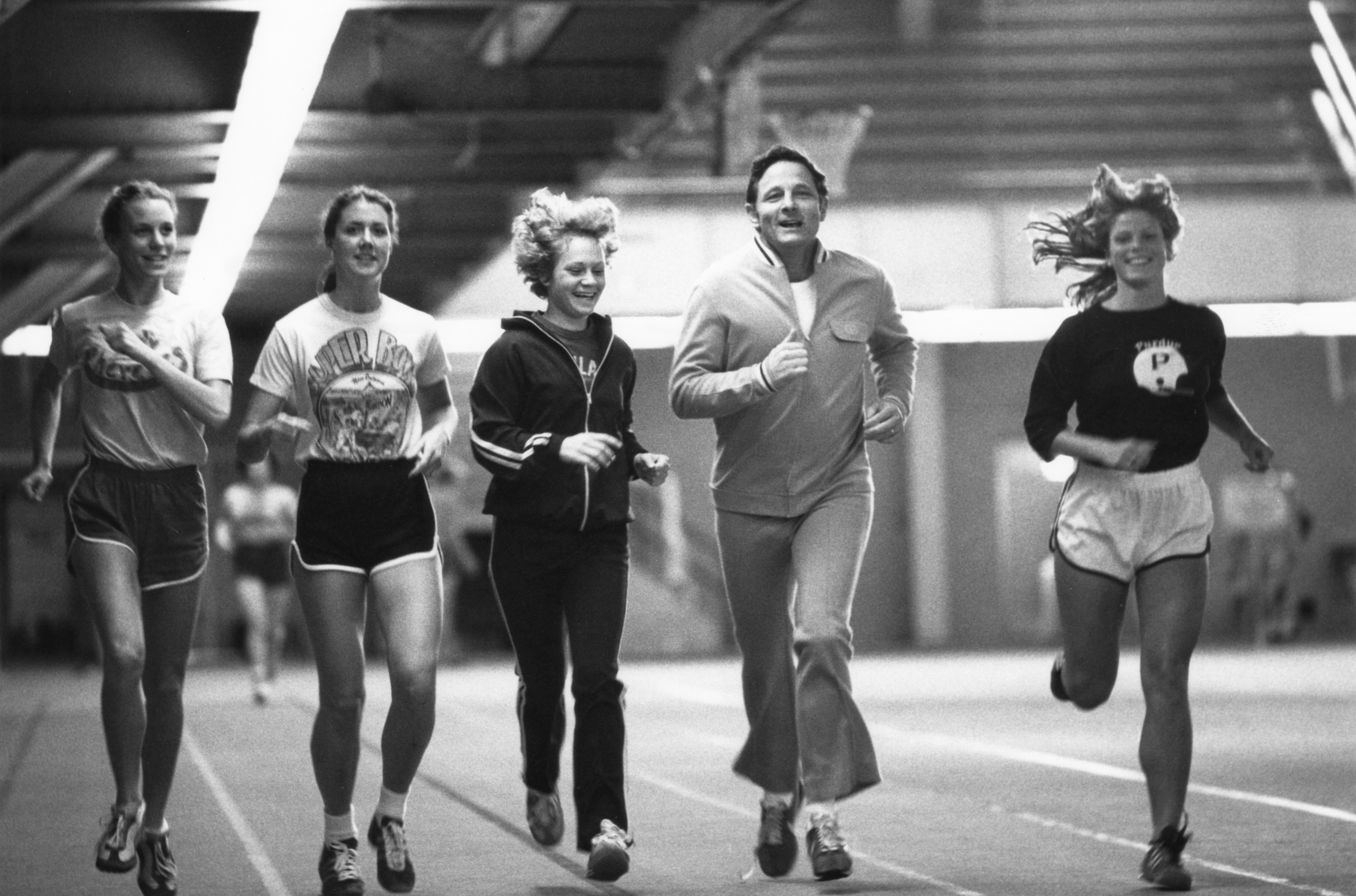
Senator Bayh exercises with Title IX athletes at Purdue University in the 1970s.

Title IX's statutory language is brief. U.S. President Nixon therefore directed the Department of Health, Education and Welfare (HEW) to publish regulations clarifying the law's application. In 1974, U.S. Senator John Tower introduced the Tower Amendment which would have exempted revenue-producing sports from Title IX compliance. Later that year, Congress rejected the Tower Amendment and passed an amendment proposed by U.S. Senator Jacob Javits directing HEW to include "reasonable provisions considering the nature of particular sports" adopted in its place. In June 1975, HEW published the final regulations detailing how Title IX would be enforced. These regulations were codified in the Federal Register in the Code of Federal Regulations Volume 34, Part 106 (34 CFR 106). Since 1975, the federal government has issued guidance clarifying how it interprets and enforces those regulations.

=== Further legislation ===
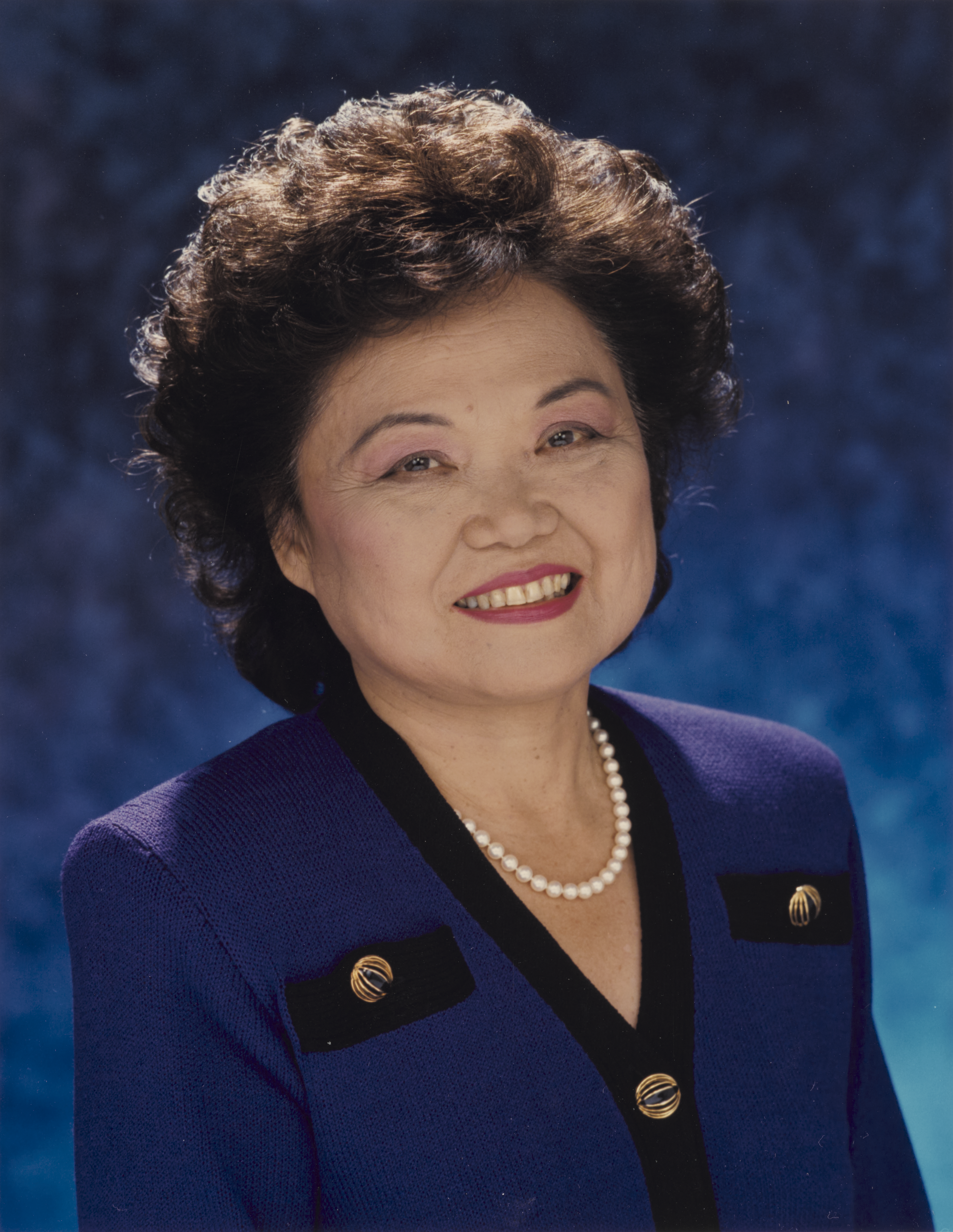
Representative Patsy Mink of Hawaii, Title IX co-author, for whom the law was renamed in 2002

The Civil Rights Restoration Act of 1988 is tied to Title IX which was passed in response to the U.S. Supreme Court's 1984 ruling Grove City College v. Bell. The Court held that Title IX applied only to those programs receiving direct federal aid. This case was initially reached by the Supreme Court when Grove City College disagreed with the Department of Education's assertion that it was required to comply with Title IX. Grove City College was not a federally funded institution; however, they did accept students who were receiving Basic Educational Opportunity Grants through a Department of Education program. The Department of Education's stance was that because some of its students were receiving federal grants, the school was thus receiving federal assistance and Title IX applied to it. The Court decided that since Grove City College was only receiving federal funding through the grant program that only this program had to comply. This ruling was a major victory for those opposed to Title IX as it then made many athletic programs outside the purview of Title IX, and thus reduced its scope.

Grove City's court victory, however, was short-lived. The Civil Rights Restoration Act passed in 1988, which extended Title IX coverage to all programs of any educational institution that receives any federal assistance, both direct and indirect. In 1994, the Equity in Athletics Disclosure Act, sponsored by Congresswoman Cardiss Collins required that federally-assisted educational institutions disclose information on roster sizes for men's and women's athletic teams; as well as budgets for recruiting, scholarships, coaches' salaries, and other expenses, annually. In 1992, the Supreme Court decided monetary relief was available under Title IX in the case Franklin v. Gwinnett County Public Schools. In October 2002, less than a month after the death of U.S. Rep. Patsy Mink, the U.S. Congress passed a resolution to rename Title IX the "Patsy Takemoto Mink Equal Opportunity in Education Act", which President George W. Bush signed into law. On November 24, 2006, Title IX regulations were amended to provide greater flexibility in the operation of single-sex classes or extracurricular activities at the primary or secondary school level; this was largely to introduce federal abstinence-only programs, which may have been a partial basis for the support of President Bush.

On May 15, 2020, the Department of Education issued a letter stating that the policy of the state of Connecticut which allows transgender girls to compete in high school sports as girls was a violation of the civil rights of female student-athletes and a violation of Title IX. It stated that Connecticut's policy "denied female student-athletes athletic benefits and opportunities, including advancing to the finals in events, higher-level competitions, awards, medals, recognition, and the possibility of greater visibility to colleges and other benefits."

On March 8, 2021, President Joe Biden issued Executive Order 14021 entitled "Guaranteeing an Educational Environment Free From Discrimination on the Basis of Sex, Including Sexual Orientation or Gender Identity", reversing changes made by the first Trump administration to limit the scope of Title IX to sex only, excluding gender identity and sexual orientation. The executive order also provided a timeline for the Secretary of Education and Attorney General to "review all existing regulations, orders, guidance documents, policies, and any other similar agency actions (collectively, agency actions) that are or may be inconsistent with the policy set forth" in the order.

On June 16, 2021, the U.S. Department of Education's Office for Civil Rights issued a Notice of Interpretation explaining that it will "enforce Title IX's prohibition on discrimination on the basis of sex to include: (1) discrimination based on sexual orientation; and (2) discrimination based on gender identity." The review set out in Executive Order 14021 is still ongoing as of April 2022.

== Impact on athletics programs ==
The introduction of Title IX was followed by a considerable increase in the number of female students participating in organized sports within American academic institutions followed by growing interest in initiating and developing programs which would pursue feminist principles in relationship to concerns surrounding issues dealing with girls and women's equality and equity in sport.

=== Institutional requirements ===
Athletic equality requirements were later set by the U.S. Department of Education Office of Civil Rights, first in 1979 and later followed by several clarifications and amendments. To meet the requirements, schools must pass at least one of three tests measuring sex equality among athletics the school offers. These tests consist of proportional numbers of males and females participating, whether or not the school is making an effort to increase the number of the unrepresented sex, if the school has a certain history of one specific sex dominating the numbers of athletes in a given sport, and whether or not the school is showing an effort to expand the program to the other sex.

=== Challenges ===
There have been different interpretations regarding Title IX's application to high school athletics. The American Sports Council sued the Department of Education in 2011 seeking a declaratory judgment that its policy interpreting Title IX's requirement for equity in participation opportunities is limited to colleges and universities. The American Sports Council argued that "The three-part test and its encouragement of quotas, has no relevance to high schools or high-school sports, and no federal regulation or interpretation has ever said that high schools must abide by the three-part test". On the other hand, the Department of Education insists that Title IX is a "valuable tool" for ensuring a level playing field for all students" and "plays a critical role in ensuring a fundamental level of fairness in America's schools and universities".

=== Coaching and administration ===
Although Title IX has helped increase the participation rate of female student athletes, several challenges remain for girls and women, including for females who aspire to become involved in professional roles within sport. The growing exposure of female sports has led to an increasingly dominant representation of males in coaching positions and roles involving the governance of female athletics.

In regards to coaching roles, in spite of the fact that the legislation has helped create more and better opportunities for women, the number of women coaches has surprisingly decreased while the number of male coaches have subsequently increased. Men have also gained a larger role in directing female athletics. For example, the male-dominated National Collegiate Athletic Association (NCAA), which had been content to let the female-dominated Association for Intercollegiate Athletics for Women (AIAW) run female championships, decided to offer female championships themselves, leading to the eventual demise of the AIAW. The NCAA later tried to claim that Congress had not intended to include athletics under Title IX's coverage, but the record lacks any sustained discussion of the matter.

=== Increasing participation ===
Advocates of Title IX's current interpretation cite increases in female athletic participation, and attribute those increases to Title IX. One study, completed in 2006, pointed to a large increase in the number of women participating in athletics at both the high school and college level. The number of women in high school sports had increased by a factor of nine, while the number of women in college sports had increased by more than 450%. A 2008 study of intercollegiate athletics showed that women's collegiate sports have grown to 9,101 teams, or 8.65 per school. The five most frequently offered college sports for women are in order: (1) Basketball, 98.8% of schools have a team; (2) Volleyball, 95.7%; (3) Soccer, 92.0%; (4) Cross Country; 90.8%, and (5) Softball; 89.2%. The lowest rank for female sports teams is bowling. The exact percentage is not known; however, there are only around 600 students on women's bowling teams in all three divisions in the NCAA.

=== Impact on men's programs ===
There have been concerns and claims that the current interpretation of Title IX by the Office for Civil Rights (OCR) has resulted in the dismantling of men's programs, despite strong participation in those sports. Some believe that the increase in athletic opportunity for girls in high school has come at the expense of boys' athletics. Because teams vary widely in size, it is more common to compare the number of total participation opportunities between the sexes. Additionally, the total number of college participation opportunities has increased for both sexes in the Title IX era, though solely for women when increased enrollment is accounted for, as men's participation has remained static relative to university enrollment, and men's opportunities outnumber women's by a wide margin.

Between 1981 and 1999, university athletic departments cut 171 men's collegiate wrestling teams, 84 men's tennis teams, 56 men's gymnastics teams, 27 men's track teams, and 25 men's swimming teams. While some teams—both men's and women's—have been eliminated in the Title IX era, both sexes have seen a net increase in the number of athletic teams over that same period. When total enrollment (which had likewise increased) is controlled for however, only women had an increase in participation.

Though interest in the sport of wrestling has consistently increased at the high school level since 1990, scores of colleges have dropped their wrestling programs during that same period. The OCR's three-prong test for compliance with Title IX often is cited as the reason for these cuts. Wrestling historically was the most frequently dropped sport, but other men's sports later overtook the lead. According to the NCAA, the most-dropped men's sports between 1987 and 2002 were as follows:

1. Cross country (183)
2. Indoor track (180)
3. Golf (178)
4. Tennis (171)
5. Rowing (132)
6. Outdoor track (126)
7. Swimming (125)
8. Wrestling (121)

Additionally, eight NCAA sports—all men's sports—were sponsored by fewer Division I schools in 2020 than in 1990, despite the D-I membership having increased by nearly 60 schools during that period.

A 2023 study found, however, that when men's sports were cut, the funding for those sports was primarily re-directed to the men's football and basketball programs. The study moreover suggests that it is in athletic directors' interest to not admit that the additional funding was for football and basketball, but to rather blame Title IX for the cuts.

In 2011, the American Sports Council (formerly called the College Sports Council) stated, "Nationwide, there are currently 1.3 million more boys participating in high school sports than girls. Using a gender quota to enforce Title IX in high school sports would put those young athletes at risk of losing their opportunity to play." High school participation rates from the National Federation of High School associations report that in 2010–11, there were 4,494,406 boys and 3,173,549 girls participating in high school athletics.

In a 2007 study of athletic opportunities at NCAA institutions the Women's Sports Foundation reported that over 150,000 female athletic opportunities would need to be added to reach participation levels proportional to the female undergraduate population. The same study found that men's athletics also receives the lion's share of athletic department budgets for operating expenses, recruiting, scholarships, and coaches salaries.

== Addressing sexual harassment and sexual violence ==
Title IX applies to all educational programs and all aspects of a school's educational system. Title IX prohibits discrimination on the basis of sex, and considers harassment to be a type of discrimination. Some types of harassment banned under Title IX include sex-based harassment, pregnancy harassment, sexual violence, and retaliation on the basis of sex or gender.

=== History and scope ===
In the late 1970s, a group of students and one faculty member sued Yale University for its failure to curtail sexual harassment on campus, especially by male faculty. This case, Alexander v. Yale, was the first to use Title IX to argue and establish that the sexual harassment of female students can be considered illegal sex discrimination. The plaintiffs in the case alleged rape, fondling, and offers of higher grades for sex by several Yale faculty. Some of the cases were based on a 1977 report authored by plaintiff Ann Olivarius, now a feminist attorney known for fighting sexual harassment, "A report to the Yale Corporation from the Yale Undergraduate Women's Caucus." Several of the plaintiffs and lawyers have written accounts of the case.

During the 1980s and 1990s, the U.S. Supreme Court ruled in multiple cases that sexual harassment, which includes sexual assault, violated Title IX because it denied equal access to educational opportunities based on sex. Later in the 1990s, the U.S. government explicitly recorded sexual harassment and assault as a type of prohibited sex-based discrimination under Title IX. Advocates such as the American Civil Liberties Union (ACLU) likewise maintain that "when students suffer sexual assault and harassment, they are deprived of equal and free access to an education." Further, according to an April 2011 letter issued by the Department of Education's Office for Civil Rights, "The sexual harassment of students, including sexual violence, interferes with students' right to receive an education free from discrimination and, in the case of sexual violence, is a crime."

During the 1990s, the Office for Civil Rights handled Title IX complaints against individual universities by investigating how they responded to high-profile student sexual harassment and assault cases. The office sometimes found universities in violation for not investigating and resolving students' cases quickly enough, and holding the cases to too high a standard of proof for the context. However, many universities did not have a standard process or personnel for investigating these complaints, and did not change their own practices when similar institutions were found in violation.

In 2011, the Obama-era Office for Civil Rights released a "Dear Colleague Letter" that prodded all U.S. schools to more diligently investigate and resolve reports of sexual assault. This was the office's first guidance issued to all universities, rather than just individually-investigated schools. The letter resulted in widespread change to how universities investigated reports of sexual harassment: schools added or changed investigation procedures and devoted more resources and jobs to becoming compliant with Title IX. The letter explicitly confirmed previously ad-hoc Title IX protocols from the last couple decades and laid out explicit guidance on handling reports of gender-based violence. This included the policy that investigations into harassment should use a "preponderance of the evidence" standard of proof, or that investigations should not take many months to finish. The letter's impact came from its statement that it is the responsibility of institutions of higher education "to take immediate and effective steps to end sexual harassment and sexual violence." The letter illustrated multiple examples of Title IX requirements as they relate to sexual violence and made it clear that, should an institution fail to fulfill its responsibilities under Title IX, the Department of Education could impose a fine and potentially deny further institutional access to federal funds. However, critics and the Trump-era Department of Education noted that this change was adopted without a rulemaking process to provide public notice and comment.

The Trump administration made changes to guidelines that were implemented during the Obama administration. These changes shifted the standard of evidence used in Title IX investigations from "preponderance of the evidence" to a higher standard of "clear and convincing" evidence. This is typically used for civil cases in which serious allegations are made (as opposed to the standard of beyond reasonable doubt in criminal cases). On September 22, 2017, US Department of Education Secretary Betsy Devos rescinded the Obama-era guidelines which had prodded colleges and universities to more aggressively investigate campus sexual assaults. On May 7, 2020, the U.S. Department of Education released final regulations governing campus sexual assault under Title IX. This was the first Title IX guidance published by the Office of Civil Rights to go through a formal notice-and-comment process since 1997. Some of the new regulations made in May 2020 involved defining sexual harassment to include "sexual assault, dating violence, domestic violence, and stalking," as discrimination, as well as requiring schools to offer attainable options for anyone to report a sexual harassment case. These regulations were more binding than earlier Dear Colleague letters, and required university compliance by August 14, 2020. On February 10, 2022, the Department of Education issued guidance on how schools should implement the new Title IX regulations. This guidance included specific information on how schools should prevent and respond to sexual harassment.

On June 23, 2022, the Biden administration issued a proposed rule to reverse the changes made by the final rule and to expand coverage regarding gender identity and pregnancy. The new rules, released in April 2024, broadened the scope of which sexual harassment cases might require investigations, and removed a requirement to hold live hearings, which victims' advocates say retraumatize survivors and discourage reporting of sexual harassment. The rule was blocked by legal challenges in many states, and was overturned by a federal judge in Kentucky in January 2025. At the start of the second Trump administration, the Department of Education directed schools and colleges to return to policies from Trump's first presidential term.

=== Lawsuits and activism ===
Title IX has been interpreted as allowing private lawsuits against educational institutions as well as formal complaints submitted to the Department of Education. In 2006, a federal court found that there was sufficient evidence that the University of Colorado acted with "deliberate indifference" toward students Lisa Simpson and Anne Gilmore, who were sexually assaulted by student football players. The university settled the case by promising to change its policies and to pay $2.5 million in damages. In 2008, Arizona State University was the subject of a lawsuit that alleged violations of rights guaranteed by Title IX: the university expelled a football player for multiple instances of severe sexual harassment, but readmitted him; he went on to rape a fellow student in her dorm room. Despite its claim that it bore no responsibility, the school settled the lawsuit, agreeing to revise and improve its official response to sexual misconduct and to pay the plaintiff $850,000 in damages and fees.

On March 15, 2011, Yale undergraduate student and alleged sexual violence survivor Alexandra Brodsky filed a Title IX complaint along with fifteen fellow students alleging Yale "has a sexually hostile environment and has failed to adequately respond to sexual harassment concerns."

In October 2012, an Amherst College student, Angie Epifano, wrote an explicit, personal account of her alleged sexual assault and the ensuing "appalling treatment" she received when coming forward to seek support from the college's administration. In the narrative, Epifano alleged that she was raped by a fellow Amherst student and described how her life was affected by the experience; she stated that the perpetrator harassed her at the only dining hall, that her academic performance was negatively affected, and that, when she sought support, the administration coerced her into taking the blame for her experience and ultimately institutionalized her and pressured her to drop out.

The fact that such a prestigious institution could have such a noxious interior fills me with intense remorse mixed with sour distaste. I am sickened by the Administration's attempts to cover up survivors' stories, cook their books to discount rapes, pretend that withdrawals never occur, quell attempts at change, and sweep sexual assaults under a rug. When politicians cover up affairs or scandals the masses often rise in angry protestations and call for a more transparent government. What is the difference between a government and the Amherst College campus? Why can't we know what is happening on campus? Why should we be quiet about sexual assault?"

When the Amherst case reached national attention, Annie E. Clark and Andrea Pino, two women who were allegedly sexually assaulted at the University of North Carolina at Chapel Hill connected with Epifano, Brodsky, and Yale Law School student Dana Bolger to address the parallel concerns of hostility at their institution, filing Title IX and Clery Act complaints against the university in January 2013, both leading to investigations by the U.S. Department of Education.

Following the national prominence of the UNC Chapel Hill case, organizers Pino and Clark went on to coordinate with students at other schools; in 2013, complaints citing violations of Title IX were filed against Occidental College (on April 18), Swarthmore College and the University of Southern California (on May 22). These complaints, the resulting campaigns against sexual violence on college campuses, and the organizing of Bolger, Brodsky, Clark, Pino and other activists led to the formation of an informal national network of activists. Bolger and Brodsky also started Know Your IX, an organization of student activists focused on legal education and federal and state policy change.

In Peltier v. Charter Day School (2022), the United States Court of Appeals for the Fourth Circuit held that a North Carolina charter school's skirts-only requirement for girls violated the Equal Protection Clause and that Title IX applies to sex-based school dress codes.

== Protections for transgender students ==
Under the Obama administration, the U.S. Department of Education-issued guidance asserted that transgender students are protected from sex-based discrimination under Title IX. In particular, Title IX of its Education Amendments of 1972 bars schools that receive financial aid assistance from sex-based discrimination in education programs and activities. It instructed public schools to treat transgender students consistent with their gender identity in academic life. A student who identifies as a transgender boy, for instance, is allowed entry to a boys-only class, and a student who identifies as a transgender girl is allowed entry to a girls-only class. This also applies to academic records if that student is over the age of eighteen at a university. The memo states in part that "[a]ll students, including transgender students, or students who do not conform to sex stereotypes, are protected from sex-based discrimination under Title IX. Under Title IX, a recipient generally must treat transgender, or gender non-conforming, consistent with their gender identity in all aspects of the planning, implementation, enrollment, operation, and evaluation of single-sex classes."

However, starting in 2017 with the Trump administration, several of these policies have been rolled back. In February 2017, the Departments of Justice and Education (headed by Attorney General Jeff Sessions and Education Secretary Betsy DeVos, respectively) withdrew the guidance on gender identity. The Education Department announced on February 12, 2018, that Title IX did not allow transgender students to use the bathroom of their gender identities.

Dwayne Bensing, a lawyer for the Office of Civil Rights within the United States Department of Education and who was in its LGBTQ affinity group, had unsuccessfully asked DeVos not to withdraw the Obama administration guidance. Two years later, in the summer of 2019, Bensing discovered that the Education Department was fast-tracking the Alliance Defending Freedom's complaint against transgender student-athletes, even though the department's attorneys did not understand the legal basis for doing so and the department had to pressure other employees. Bensing leaked this information to the Washington Blade and was forced to resign in December 2019.

In October 2018, The New York Times obtained a memo issued by the Department of Health and Human Services that would propose a strict definition of gender for Title IX, using the person's sex as determined at birth and could not be changed, effectively limiting recognition of transgender students and potentially others. The memo stated that the government needed to define gender "on a biological basis that is clear, grounded in science, objective and administrable". The news brought immediate protests in several locations as well as online social media under the "#WontBeErased" hashtag.

In May 2020, the Trump administration's Department of Education contended that the rights of cisgender women are infringed upon by transgender women. The Education Department started to withhold federal funding to schools which affirm the identities of transgender athletes.

In August 2020, the United States Court of Appeals for the Eleventh Circuit affirmed a 2018 lower court ruling in Adams v. The School Board of St. Johns County, Florida that discrimination on the basis of gender identity is discrimination "on the basis of sex" and is prohibited under Title IX (federal civil rights law) and the Equal Protection Clause of the 14th Amendment to the US Constitution.

In December 2020, the "Protect Women in Sports" Act was introduced to the U.S. House of Representatives. It would block schools from receiving federal funding if transgender girls and nonbinary people are allowed to compete on girls' sports teams at those schools. It was sponsored by Representatives Tulsi Gabbard, a Democrat at the time, and Markwayne Mullin, a Republican.

In 2021, the Biden administration took steps to reinstate some of the protections for transgender students that had been rescinded under the Trump administration. These included two executive orders—13988 in January 2021 and 14021 in March 2021—which were supported by the US Department of Education, though their ability to implement their guidance was limited in June 2022 within the states of Alabama, Alaska, Arizona, Arkansas, Georgia, Idaho, Indiana, Kansas, Kentucky, Louisiana, Mississippi, Missouri, Montana, Nebraska, Ohio, Oklahoma, Tennessee, South Carolina, South Dakota, and West Virginia.

On January 9, 2025, U.S. District court judge Danny C. Reeves of Kentucky struck down the Biden administration's expanded protections, striking down the change nationwide.

In Donald Trump's second term, the Department of Education reverted to 2022 regulations on protections based on gender identity under Title IX. On January 20, 2025, President Donald Trump issued Defending Women from Gender Ideology Extremism and Restoring Biological Truth to the Federal Government which, for the purposes of the federal government, defined the sex of a person as their sex at conception. It also said that this sex could not be changed during a person's life. The order also rescinded Biden's executive orders 13988 and 14021 which defined a person's sex as their self assessed gender identity. In February, President Trump signed Executive Order 14201, directing the federal government to interpret Title IX rules as prohibiting transgender girls and women from female sports.

In April, the Department of Justice and Department of Education launched the Title IX Special Investigations Team to streamline investigations into violations of policies prohibiting transgender women and girls from sports teams and restrooms, stating in a news release that the team would "protect students, and especially female athletes, from the pernicious effects of gender ideology in school programs and activities." The LGBTQ advocacy group GLAAD accused the initiative of wasting taxpayer resources and warned such bans "endanger all girls as they risk invasive genital exams and other expensive 'verification.'"

On June 2, the Department of Education announced that it would recognize June as "Title IX Month" to commemorate the laws's fifty-third anniversary. News outlets and both critics and advocates have connected the commemoration as a purposeful undermining of Pride Month, which is also celebrated in June.

== OCR's test for Title IX compliance ==
Title IX has been a source of controversy in part due to claims that the OCR's current interpretation of Title IX, and specifically its three-prong test of compliance, is no longer faithful to the anti-discrimination language in Title IX's text, and instead discriminates against men and has contributed to the reduction of programs for male athletes.

Critics of the three-prong test contend that it operates as a "quota" in that it places undue emphasis on the first prong (known as the "proportionality" prong), which fails to take into account any differences in the genders' respective levels of interest in participating in athletics (despite the third prong, which focuses on any differences in the genders' respective levels of interest in participation). Instead, it requires that the genders' athletic participation be substantially proportionate to their enrollment, without regard to interest. Prong two is viewed as only a temporary fix for universities, as universities may only point to the past expansion of opportunities for female students for a limited time before compliance with another prong is necessary. Critics say that prong three likewise fails to consider male athletic interest despite its gender-neutral language, as it requires that the university fully and effectively accommodate the athletic interests of the "underrepresented sex", even though ED regulations expressly require that the OCR consider whether the institution "effectively accommodate[s] the interests and abilities of members of both sexes". As such, with a focus on increasing female athletic opportunities without any counterbalance to consider male athletic interest, critics maintain that the OCR's three-prong test operates to discriminate against men.

Defenders of the three-prong test counter that the genders' differing athletic interest levels are merely a product of past discrimination, and that Title IX should be interpreted to maximize female participation in athletics regardless of any existing disparity in interest. Thus while defenders argue that the three-prong test embodies the maxim that "opportunity drives interest", critics argue that the three-prong test goes beyond Title IX original purpose of preventing discrimination, and instead amounts to an exercise in which athletic opportunities are taken away from male students and given to female students, despite the comparatively lower interest levels of those female students. Author and self-described women's rights advocate John Irving opined in a New York Times column that on this topic, women's advocates were being "purely vindictive" in insisting that the current OCR interpretation of Title IX be maintained.

On March 17, 2005, OCR announced a clarification of prong three of the three-part test of Title IX compliance. The guidance concerned the use of web-based surveys to determine the level of interest in varsity athletics among the underrepresented sex. Opponents of the clarification – including the NCAA Executive Committee, which issued a resolution soon afterward asking Association members not to use the survey – claimed the survey was flawed in part because of the way it counted non-responses. On April 20, 2010, the U.S. Department of Education's Office for Civil Rights abandoned the 2005 clarification that allowed institutions to use only Internet or e‑mail surveys to meet the interests and abilities (third prong) option of the three-part test for Title IX compliance.

In February 2010, the United States Commission on Civil Rights weighed in on the OCR's three-prong test, offering several recommendations on Title IX policy to address what it termed "unnecessary reduction of men's athletic opportunities". The commission advocated use of surveys to measure interest, and specifically recommended that the Department of Education's regulations on interest and abilities be revised "to explicitly take into account the interest of both sexes rather than just the interest of the underrepresented sex", almost always females.

== Legacy and recognition ==
On the twenty-fifth anniversary of Title IX the National Women's Law Center lodged twenty-five complaints with the U.S. Department of Education's Office for Civil Rights.

After Title IX was implemented, there was controversy about the amount of athletic integration, especially among female education leaders who worried about girls being injured or bullied by rough boys in coeducational activities. While there were always some parents and administrators who did not like the idea of coed gym classes, that has in fact become the norm as a result of Title IX.

There were several events praising the 40th anniversary of Title IX in June 2012. For example, the White House Council on Women and Girls hosted a panel to discuss the life-altering nature of sports. Panelists included Billie Jean King, All‑American NCAA point guard Shoni Schimmel of the University of Louisville, and Aimee Mullins, the first double-amputee sprinter to compete in NCAA track and field for Georgetown University.

President Barack Obama wrote a pro–Title IX op-ed published in Newsweek magazine.

The Women's Sports Foundation honored over 40 female athletes.

On June 21, 2012, espnW projected a digital mosaic featuring the largest-ever collection of women and girls' sports images (all of which were submitted by the athletes themselves) onto the First Amendment tablet of the Newseum in Washington, D.C. The mosaic also included photos of espnW's Top 40 Athletes of the Past 40 Years.

ESPN The Magazine produced its first "Women in Sports" issue in June 2012, and in the same month ESPN Classic first showed the documentary Sporting Chance: The Lasting Legacy of Title IX, narrated by Holly Hunter. It also showed the documentary On the Basis of Sex: The Battle for Title IX in Sports, and other programming related to women's sports.

In 2013 ESPN Films broadcast Nine for IX, a series of documentaries about women in sports. Good Morning America anchor Robin Roberts and Tribeca Productions co founder Jane Rosenthal are executive producers of the series.

The NCAA announced in April 2019 that it would hold its 2023 Division II and Division III women's basketball championship games at American Airlines Center in Dallas, which had previously been announced as the site for that season's Division I women's Final Four. In its announcement, the NCAA explicitly called the joint championship event "a 50th-year celebration of Title IX" (as that particular basketball season will begin in calendar 2022).

== Criticism ==
Title IX has been called "toothless" and criticized for failing to enforce compliance with the law's regulations. The Center for Public Integrity expressed this concern within their series on sexual assault on college campuses, as was echoed by USA TODAY reporters in their investigative series "Title IX: Falling short at 50." The U.S. Department of Education's Office for Civil Rights is supposed to hold schools in compliance with Title IX, but it is under-resourced, and when it finds that schools are out of compliance, its only punitive measure is to revoke federal funding from a school. This is such a severe penalty that it had never been used as of 2022. Instead, the office tries to work cooperatively with schools found in violation. However, schools can choose not to cooperate, withholding records, refusing to meet, and delaying or dropping future communications without penalty. In the investigative series, interviews with insiders stated that this has resulted in mindsets across university administrations that discount parts of Title IX as easily ignored, and some aggressively noncompliant schools have been found in violation but ignored their resolution agreements for years without consequences.

Title IX has been blamed for failing to adequately protect students from sexual assault. These concerns have been raised by lawyers, gender advocacy groups, as well as media outlets reporting on how schools handle sexual assault. Despite 1 in 5 women and 1 in 16 men in college being sexually assaulted there, a USA Today investigation in 2022 found that only 1 in 12,400 students are suspended and 1 in 22,900 expelled in a given year for sexual misconduct. Schools often set up complicated policies that allow a school to avoid investigating reports of harassment in the first place, and investigations overwhelmingly decide that no or minimal consequences are merited. At most colleges, Title IX-related offices are understaffed and investigations routinely take months. This disincentivizes reporting and has been described as a process that punishes victims rather than helping them get accountability.

Concern has been expressed that colleges have been overly aggressive in enforcing Title IX regulations, particularly about sexual matters. Laura Kipnis, author of How to Become a Scandal: Adventures in Bad Behavior (New York: Metropolitan Books, 2010), and others have argued that Title IX regulations have empowered investigators who routinely endanger academic freedom and fair process, presume the guilt of suspects, assign the man full responsibility for the outcome of any social interaction, and minutely regulate personal relationships.

Writing in The Atlantic, Emily Yoffe has criticized the Title IX process for being unfair to the accused, based on faulty science, and racially biased against students of color.

== See also ==
- North Haven Bd. of Educ. v. Bell
- State of Tennessee v. Cardona
