= Women's education in the United States =

In the early colonial history of the United States, higher education was restricted for men only, but since the 1800s, women's positions and opportunities in the educational sphere have increased. Since the late 1970s and early 1980s, women have surpassed men in number of bachelor's degrees and master's degrees conferred annually in the United States. Starting in 2005, female students have also received a majority of doctorates awarded each year.

== Statistics ==
=== Mid 20th Century ===
Ellen DuBois and Lynn Dumenil estimated that the number of bachelor and doctorate degrees from 1950 to 1980 for women were:

Year	% of bachelor's degrees	% of doctorate degrees
1950	23.9%	9.7%
1960	35%	10.5%
1970	41.5%	13.3%
1980	49%	30.3%

The statistics for enrollment of women in higher education in the 1930s varies depending upon the type of census performed in that year.

According to the U.S. Office of Education, the total number of enrollment for women in higher education the U.S. in 1930 was 480,802. This information was gathered by the U.S. Office of Education on a biannual basis, and reflects an estimate for the academic year (Fall 1929 - Spring 1930).

The U.S. Department of Commerce and Bureau of the Census performed a preliminary estimate for the same year (1930) of women in higher education in the U.S. The total number was 481,000 enrolled. This estimate was based on a calendar year census, in contrast to the academic year estimate performed by the U.S. Office of Education in the same year.

=== Since the 1970s ===
Since the early 1970s, women have surpassed men in terms of college enrollment and graduation rates. Total undergraduate degree figures show that they outnumbered male students for the first time in the late 1970s. However, since 1981, women have steadily been outpacing men in bachelor's degrees earned, from only a 1% lead in 1980 to 33% advantage in 2015. This means that for every 100 men that graduate, 134 women do. There are a substantial amount of scholarships meant to help women's access to education - "5,864 verified private scholarships, showed that there are 4 times as many scholarships specifically designated for women as opposed to those for men.".

Percent of college degrees acquired by women, by year
Year	Associate's	Bachelor's	Master's	Doctorate
1970-1971	42.9%	43.4%	39.3%	10.6%
1980–1981	54.7%	49.8%	49.5%	29.0%
1990–1991	58.8%	53.9%	53.1%	39.1%
2000-2001	61.6%	57.3%	58.2%	46.3%
2010-2011	61.7%	57.2%	60.1%	51.4%
2020–2021	61.1%	57.7%	60.7%	54.1%

Graph of degree attainment over time

View source data.

== History ==
=== Colonial ===
In Colonial America elementary education was widespread in New England, but limited elsewhere. New England Puritans believed it was necessary to study the Bible, so boys and girls were taught to read at an early age. It was also required that each town pay for a primary school. About 10 percent enjoyed secondary schooling. Few girls attended formal schools, but most were able to get some education at home or at so-called "Dame schools" where women taught basic reading and writing skills in their own houses. By 1750, nearly 90% of New England's women and almost all of its men could read and write. There was no higher education for women.

Tax-supported schooling for girls began as early as 1767 in New England. It was optional and some towns proved reluctant. Northampton, Massachusetts, for example, was a late adopter because it had many rich families who dominated the political and social structures and they did not want to pay taxes to aid poor families. Northampton assessed taxes on all households, rather than only on those with children, and used the funds to support a grammar school to prepare boys for college. Not until after 1800 did Northampton educate girls with public money. In contrast, the town of Sutton, Massachusetts, was diverse in terms of social leadership and religion at an early point in its history. Sutton paid for its schools by means of taxes on households with children only, thereby creating an active constituency in favor of universal education for both boys and girls.

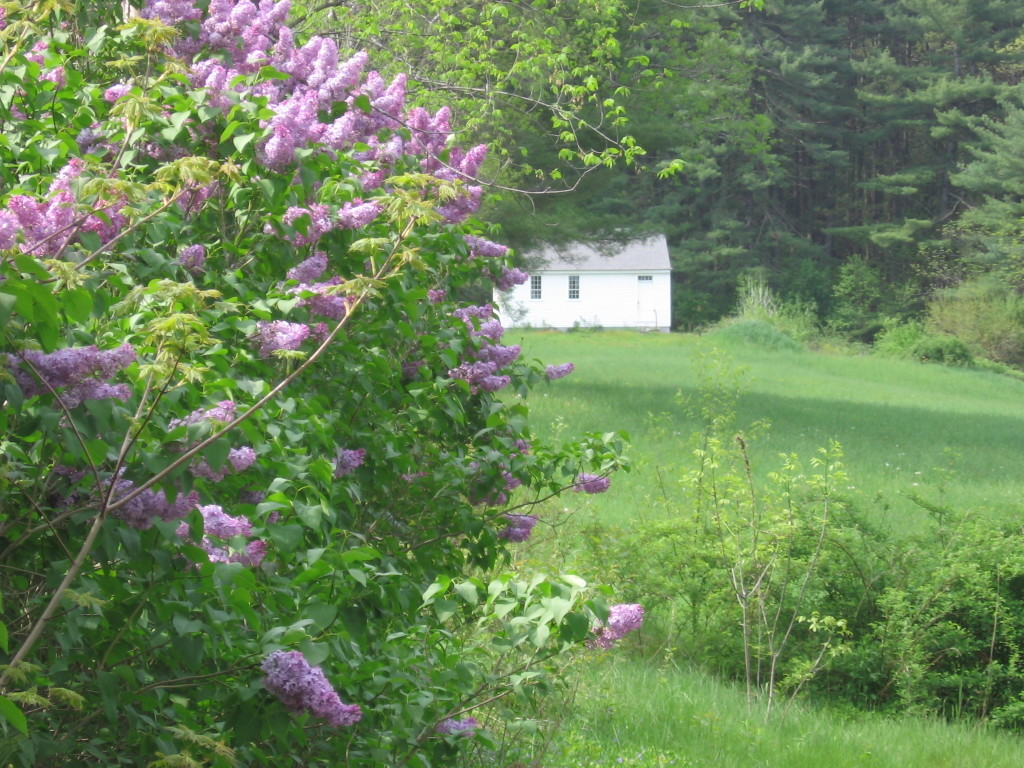
Colonial schoolhouse in Hollis, New Hampshire

Historians point out that reading and writing were different skills in the colonial era. School taught both, but in places without schools reading was mainly taught to boys and also a few privileged girls. Men handled worldly affairs and needed to read and write. Girls only needed to read (especially religious materials). This educational disparity between reading and writing explains why the colonial women often could read, but could not write and could not sign their names—they used an "X".

Across the South, there was very little public schooling. Most parents either home schooled their children using peripatetic tutors or sent them to small local private schools. A study of women's signatures in Georgia indicates a high degree of literacy in areas with schools. In South Carolina, scores of school projects were advertised in the South Carolina Gazette beginning in 1732.

==== Early colonial ideology ====
Ideologies held by the majority of early colonial society regarding women's access to education contributed greatly to the lack of opportunity for education among these women. Seventeenth-century attitudes did not stress significant importance on women's education, as evidenced by early opinions in the New England colonies. This majority also considered their access to education as unnecessary or dangerous, as their commonly held roles as mothers prevented society from seeing other possible abilities that would demand a need for education. The primary source of respect among these colonial New England women derived from their completion of domestic tasks, not a desire for or fulfillment of intellectual practices.

Structurally, men undoubtedly held a much greater position of power and control than women, as proves true historically. As a result of this imbalance, an inferior perspective to which women became viewed under carried over into intellectual opportunities. Overall, their abilities were not considered level with those of their male counterparts, so no pressing need to further develop their intellect was acknowledged.

However, as samplers and penbooks show, female children developed basic literacy. Most mothers were able to teach young children at home, and women like Anne Bradstreet and Philis Wheatley wrote published poetry. Samuel Sewall's diary references describe his children, boys and girls alike, taking turns reading Scriptures at night, and being praised equally for doing well. The 1770 diarist Anne Winslow Green wrote to tell her mother that her Aunt Deeming was quite literate, correcting her letters home; this same woman later recounted her own appeals for aid when, as a Tory during the American Revolutionary War, she tried to escape with a carriage of furniture and other belongings after the Siege of Boston was lifted. But resistance to the admission of upper levels of education persisted.

These public attitudes that did not recognize a need for women's education eventually changed. The number of advocates for women's improved access to educational institutions grew gradually. New England's town school in Farmington, Connecticut saw a push for the school to include young girls as well as boys by a minority of people in 1687, a battle which would then extend into the next few centuries.

=== 19th century ===
In the first half of the 19th century, only a minority of American children, both girls and boys, spent any meaningful time in a classroom. An even smaller minority received any secondary education. 18–19th centuries famous for significant changes in the education system. Some of the cities started to include women in the education programs. for instance, Boston gave girls right to attend school during exact hours. The important part was that they could participate only in the early morning or late afternoon, when boys weren't around. This rule existed until the beginning of the 1800s when schools began accepting co-education between boys and girls.

==== Emma Willard ====
Emma Willard (1787–1870), was a New York educator and writer who dedicated her life to women's education. She worked in several schools and founded the first school for women's higher education, the Troy Female Seminary in Troy, New York, which is now Emma Willard School. With the success of her school, she was able to travel across the country and abroad, to promote education for women. Willard pioneered the teaching of science, mathematics, and social studies to young women. She believed in establishing her own guidelines for better education for women, and her book proceeds helped improve female education throughout the world. Willard coauthored one of the most widely used textbooks of American history, as well as the first historical atlas of the U.S. The maps, graphs, and pictures added the details of the nation's geography into the broad popular image of the country as a large, powerful complex nation. Republican motherhood idealized a "ladylike atmosphere" and "cultivation". Willard's Female Seminary became a much copied modeled in part because it helped young women fit into their "place in society". She thought the notion of female college graduates "absurd". Elizabeth Cady Stanton, a graduate of Willard's Seminary, was resentful of this attitude, a formative experience that contributed to her feminist activism in later life.

==== Colleges for women ====
At the college level, a few private schools followed Oberlin's 1833 example of enrolling women, but notably the state schools restricted admission to men.

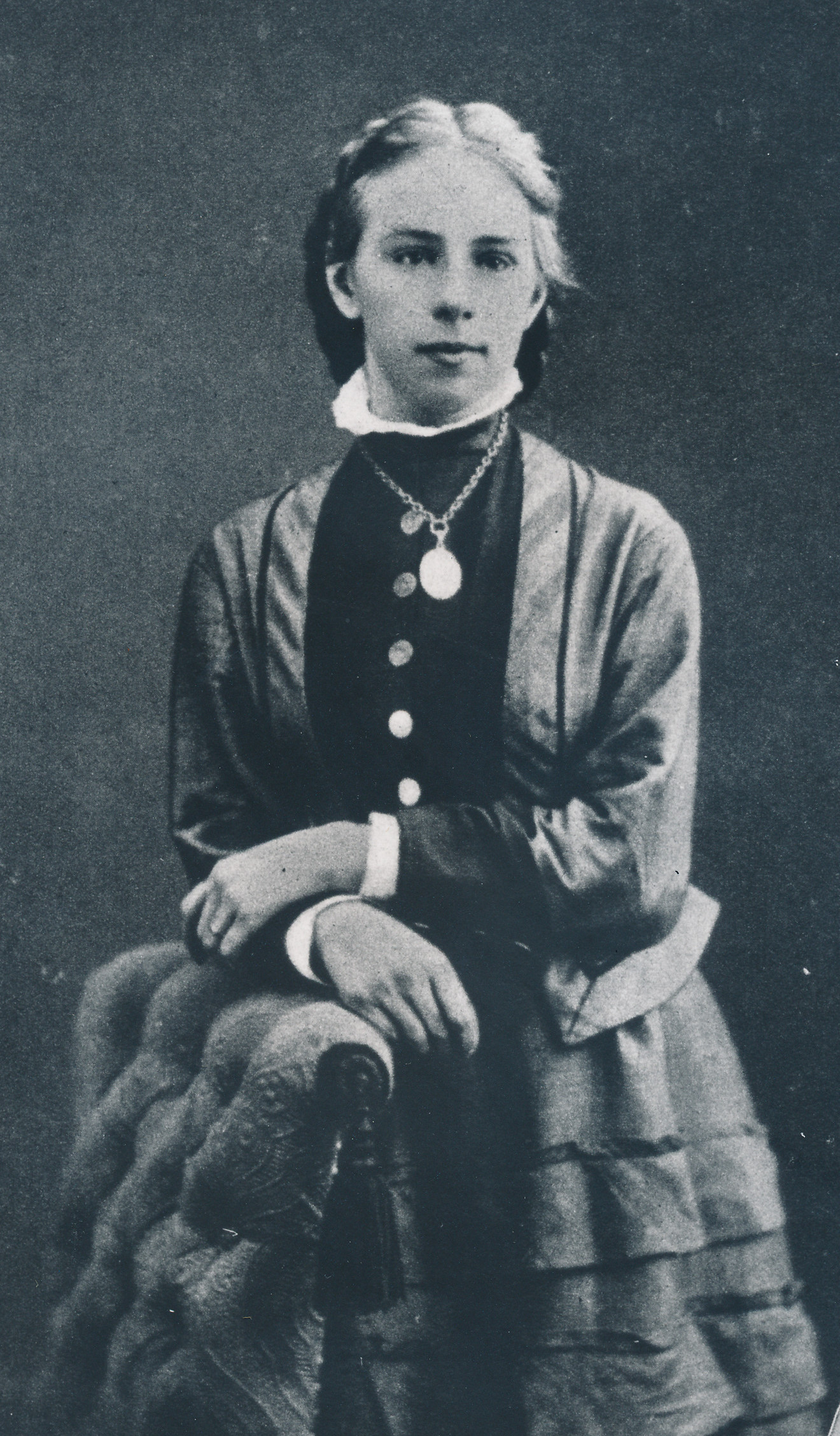
In 1890, Emilie Kempin-Spyri, JD, taught law at the Woman's Law Class of New York University through an endowed NYU university extension program for women.

The second half of the 19th century, on the other hand, produced relatively rapid gains for women's education in the United States. The founding of Vassar in 1865 was followed by Wellesley in 1875, Smith in the same year, Bryn Mawr in 1885, Radcliffe in 1879, and Barnard in 1889. Such institutions were fed by a steady stream of female high school graduates, who throughout this period comprised a majority of graduates. High school enrollment trebled in the 1890s, with girls continuing to represent the lion's share. The expansion of both secondary and tertiary public education that began in 1867 and lasted until the early 20th century created greater opportunities for women. Between 1867 and 1915, 304 new colleges and universities were established, bringing the American total to 563 such institutions. On the liberal arts faculties of state colleges such as Colorado, Iowa, Kansas, Minnesota, Nebraska, Texas, and Washington, women outnumbered men; indeed, the president of the University of Wisconsin was urging quota restrictions.

=== 20th century ===
Coinciding with the beginnings of the first wave of feminism in the 20th century came the attempt by women to gain equal rights to education in the United States. After long battles against gender oppression women finally obtained the right to be educated through several government acts/conventions, the opening of facilities willing to educate them, and the opportunity to continue into higher education.

Before the education reform that occurred during the Progressive Era, boys and girls often had different course programs of study. It was not uncommon for girls to be educated towards the jobs society deemed appropriate, such as secretary, journalist, or social-service worker. The idea of a "differentiated curriculum" between boys and girls was common throughout schools in the United States. This caused the high school education system to become a more "efficient site for the construction of gender". During this time, there was a push to make women a better "domesticated citizen" rather than a scholar. The voices of many women were just beginning to be heard in society as well as the education system, but there was still opposition from some as to the credibility of their words. Girls of different races and ethnicities were also entering the public school system at this time. Often, the course of scholarly study was impacted by the race of the individual.

=== 1930s ===
The 1930s marked great economic hardship with the onset of the decade-long Great Depression in late 1929. A college major had to be a practical one in terms of the job hunt. How to justify college expenses became very real for women and their families. A study in 1924 that surveyed nearly sixteen-hundred woman PhD recipients concluded that seventy percent required grants, scholarships, and fellowships in order to cover the expense associated with earning a higher degree. Despite the financial support, the majority of these women were required to save money for years before pursuing their degrees because the aid was never enough. Despite these disadvantages, the 1930s marked the peak of woman PhD earners. These degrees varied in fields and began to legitimize fields for women that were once off-limits.

The "self-support" that these women engaged in to help finance their education became a widely accepted necessity. Both men and women were forced to find ways of supporting their education at this period of time. To help lessen the financial burden faced by families trying to educate their children, the National Youth Administration was created by the United States Government. Between 1935 and 1943, the NYA spent nearly 93 million dollars providing financial assistance. Despite the growing increasing opportunities for women in education, there was a constant need to justify the expense. As the number of college graduates increased, those who were displaced during the Great Depression had to compete with a younger and more-educated group of people.

==== Controversies ====
Education was a controversial topic in the 1930s, and sex-segregated school systems were seen as protecting "the virtue of female high school students." Home economics and industrial education were new elements of the high school curriculum designed for women's occupations. These classes taught women practical skills such as sewing, cooking, and using the new domestic inventions of the era; this "formal training offered women little advantage in the struggle for stable work at a liveable wage."

The 1930s also saw large changes in women's education at the college level. In 1900, there were 85,338 female college students in the United States and 5,237 earned their bachelor's degrees; by 1940, there were 600,953 female college students and 77,000 earned bachelor's degrees. This increase was partially explained by the "contemporary discourse that reinforced the need for higher education for women in their positions as wives, mothers, citizens, and professionals."

Arguments in favor of women's education emphasized concepts of eugenics and citizenship. Education was supposed to teach women how to exercise their civic responsibilities. Participation in student government trained women "early to become leaders later." One study showed that in 1935, 62 percent of women college graduates voted, compared to only 50 percent of women who did not attend college.

There was a perception that college educated women were less likely to marry, either because they "waited too long" or because the college educated women valued partnerships based on equality between spouses. Others argued college made women better wives and mothers because it "imparted practical skills."

Despite have had the right to vote since 1920, women were still largely restricted from positions of political power. Despite growing numbers of women graduates, many were denied positions that they were qualified for in favor of men. This struggle sparked new examples of political activism and increased support for an Equal Rights Amendment.

==== Areas of study ====
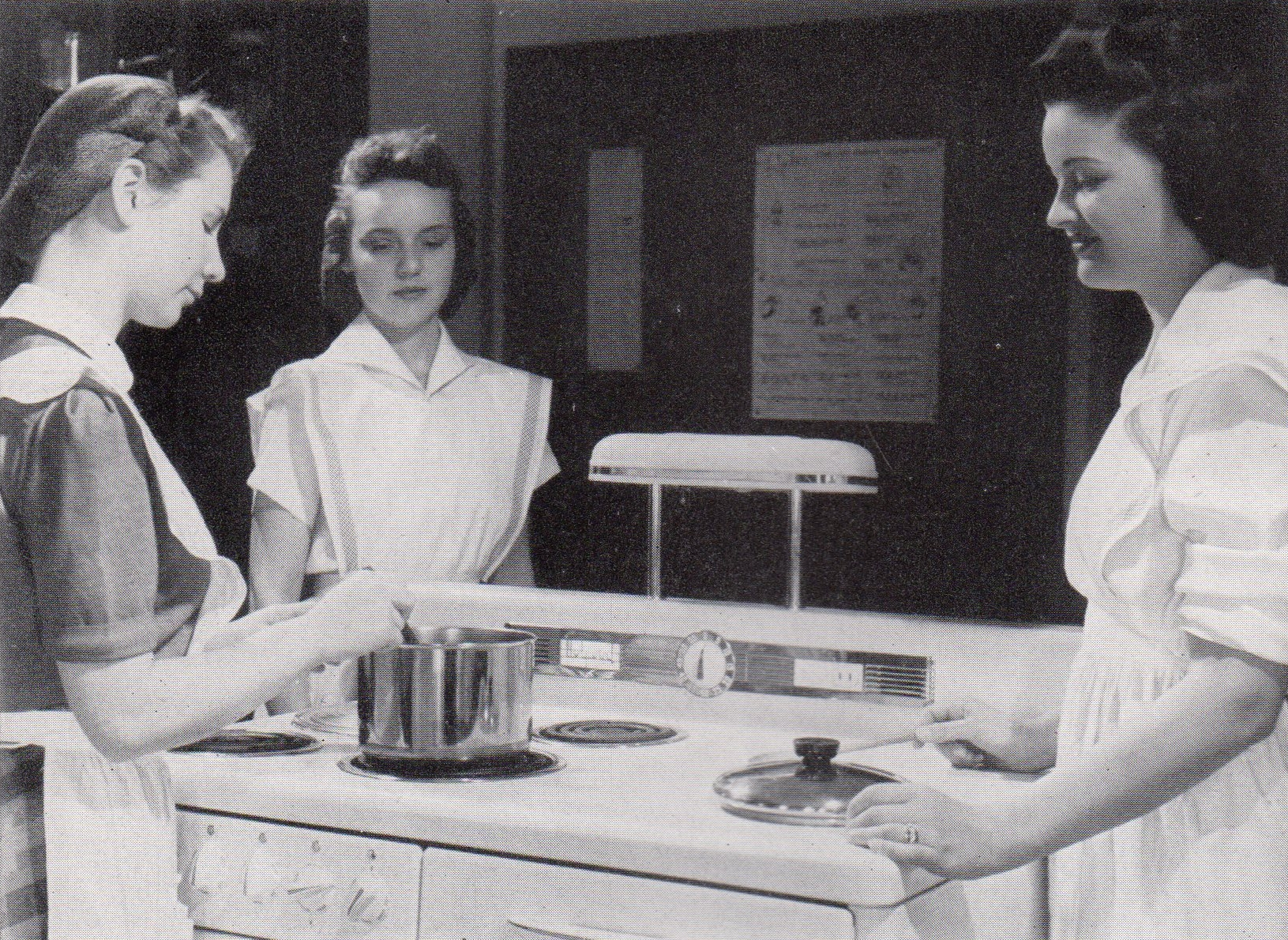
Home economics students at Shimer College in 1942

Teaching and nursing were the top two fields for women throughout the 1930s, but home economics also experienced a great surge in popularity during the Depression. Home economics brought a scientific language to the traditional women's sphere of the home and raised "homemaking to the status of a respectable – though definitely female – occupation." Social work, child development, and nursery school educational programs were also popular.

In addition to this strong vocational orientation in American education during the opening decades of the twentieth century, women began to make slow inroads into traditionally male dominated areas of education such as business, science, medicine, architecture, engineering, and law. Women were also able to gain positions of responsibility within the federal government because of the watershed events of the New Deal.

=== Women's colleges ===
Prior to the American Civil War few colleges admitted women. Founded in 1772 as a primary school, Salem College is the oldest female educational establishment. However, it did not award college degrees until 1890.

Some were founded as co-educational institutions; Oberlin Collegiate Institute, after 1850 Oberlin College, founded in 1833, was the first college to accept both women and African Americans as students.

Other early coeducational schools included Hillsdale College, founded as Michigan Central College in Spring Arbor, Michigan in 1844, the short-lived New-York Central College in McGraw, New York (1849–1860), and Antioch College, founded by noted educator Horace Mann in 1852 in Yellow Springs, Ohio. Hollins University, founded as the co-educational Valley Union Seminary in Roanoke, Virginia, in 1842; it became all female in 1852;

A number of colleges were founded before the Civil War with all-female student bodies, including (among others, in addition to Salem): Mount Holyoke College of South Hadley, Massachusetts, founded in 1837 by Mary Lyon as Mount Holyoke Female Seminary; Wesleyan College of Macon, Georgia, founded in 1836 as Georgia Female College, and is the first college in the world chartered to grant degrees to women; Queens College (now Queens University) of Charlotte, North Carolina, founded in 1857 as Charlotte Female Institute; Averett College (now Averett University) of Danville, Virginia, founded in 1859 as Union women's College; and Vassar College, founded in Poughkeepsie, New York in 1861.

With the start of the war many males were in uniform so more opportunities arose for women to fill the empty space in schools and the universities became more willing to admit the women. Slowly more educational institutions opened their doors to women; today, there are 60 women's colleges in the United States offering educational programs that parallel co-educational universities both in subject matter and in quality.

=== Government action ===
In 1848 the Seneca Falls Convention was held in New York to gain support for education and suffrage but it had little immediate impact. This convention is significant because it created a foundation for efforts toward equal education for women, even though it was not actually achieved until much later.

The Morrill Land-Grant Colleges Act of 1862 founded universities to educate both men and women in practical fields of study, though women's courses were still centered around home economics. By 1870 30% of colleges were co-educational, later in the 1930s women-only colleges were established that expanded opportunities for courses of study to include more intellectual development as opposed to domestic instruction.

In July 1975 "Title IX regulations became effective as law" (Margaret Fund of NWLC, 2012). The law provided one year for compliance to elementary schools and three years for compliance to high schools and post secondary institutions. Through the 1970s the law's enactment, opposition towards the legislation, and initial compliance for the law were the focus. According to the Margaret Fund (2012), in 1982 a court case was won upholding the nondiscriminatory acts in employment, the case title is as follows, North Haven Board of Education v. Bell, 456 U.S. 512 (1982). In 1984, the case Grove City v. Bell, 465 U.S. 555 (1984) a, "U.S. Supreme Court decision held that federal spending clause statutes only apply to those programs or activities that receive direct federal financial assistance, effectively ending Title IX applicability to athletics" (Margaret Fund of NWLC). This decision is later remedied in the late 1980s by the Civil Rights Restoration Act of 1987. In 1988, this act was passed by Congress and reversed the damage from the Grove City v. Bell decision. The Margaret Fund (2012) states, "It over-rode the Grove City v. Bell decision by expanding the definition of program or activity that receives Federal financial assistance" (Margaret Fund of NWLC, para.5). During the 1990s three significant changes or continuations to the law were made in the course of the decade. First, a Supreme Court decision allowed an individual to sue for monetary retributions by citing the Title IX Act. Second, the disclosure act in 1994 stated that all institutions under Title IX were to report publicly on their operations, with an effective implementation date set for 1996. Third, the ORC distributed requirements to institutions and schools which are explained and outlined more clearly the regulations for Title IX. The significant events in the 2000s allow schools to use e-mail surveys, and due to a Supreme Court case in 2009, Fitzgerald v. Barnstable School Committee, lawsuits on the basis of sexual discrimination under Title IX can be brought by parents.

== Timeline of women's education in the United States ==
=== 18th century ===
1727: The Ursuline Academy, the oldest continuously-operating school for girls in the United States, was founded in 1727 by the Sisters of the Order of Saint Ursula, in New Orleans. The Academy included the first free school for women, and offered the first classes for female African-American slaves, free women of color, and Native Americans.

1742: German-speaking Moravians in Pennsylvania established the first all-girls boarding school in America, the Bethlehem Female Seminary, to serve the Moravian community in and near Bethlehem. In 1863 it became a college. In 1913 it became Moravian Seminary and College for Women. Historians accept Moravian as the oldest—though not continuously operational because of its current co-ed status—specifically female institute of higher learning in the United States.

1783: Washington College in Chestertown, Maryland, appointed the first women instructors at any American college. Elizabeth Callister Peale and Sarah Callister taught painting and drawing.

=== 19th century ===
1826: The first American public high schools for girls were opened in New York and Boston.

1828: The South Carolina Female Collegiate Institute was founded in Columbia, South Carolina.

1829: The first public examination of an American girl in geometry was held.

1831: As a private institution in 1831, Mississippi College became the first coeducational college in the United States to grant degrees to women; in December 1831 it granted degrees to two women, Alice Robinson and Catherine Hall.

1835: Ingham University was the first women's college in New York State and the first chartered women's university in the United States; it was founded in 1835 as the Attica (NY) Female Seminary by Mariette and Emily E. Ingham, who moved the school to Le Roy in 1837. The school was chartered on April 6, 1852, as the Ingham Collegiate Institute, and a full university charter was granted in April 1857.

1837: Mount Holyoke College was founded in 1837 by Mary Lyon as "Mount Holyoke Female Seminary".

1849: Elizabeth Blackwell, born in England, became the first woman to earn a medical degree from an American college, Geneva Medical College in New York.

1850: Lucy Sessions earned a literary degree from Oberlin College, becoming the first African American woman in the United States to receive a college degree.

1855: The University of Iowa became the first coeducational public or state university in the United States.

1858: Mary Fellows became the first woman west of the Mississippi River to receive a baccalaureate degree (from Cornell College).

1858: Sarah Jane Woodson Early became the first African-American woman college instructor (Wilberforce University).

1862: Mary Jane Patterson became the first African-American woman to earn a Bachelor of Arts. She earned her degree from Oberlin College.

1863: Mary Corinna Putnam Jacobi graduated from the New York College of Pharmacy in 1863, which made her the first woman to graduate from a United States school of pharmacy.

1864: Rebecca Crumpler became the first African-American woman to graduate from a U.S. college with a medical degree and the first and only African-American woman to obtain the Doctress of Medicine degree from New England Female Medical College in Boston, Massachusetts.

1866: Lucy Hobbs Taylor became the first American woman to earn a dental degree, which she earned from the Ohio College of Dental Surgery.

1866: Sarah Jane Woodson Early became the first African-American woman to serve as a professor. Xenia, Ohio's Wilberforce University hired her to teach Latin and English in 1866.

1869: Fanny Jackson Coppin was named principal of the Institute for Colored Youth in Philadelphia, becoming the first African-American woman to head an institution for higher learning in the United States.

1870: Ada Kepley became the first woman to graduate from law school in the United States; she graduated from Chicago University Law School, predecessor to Union College of Law, later known as Northwestern University School of Law.

1870: Ellen Swallow Richards became the first American woman to earn a degree in chemistry, which she earned from Vassar College in 1870.

1871: Frances Elizabeth Willard became the first female college president in the United States, as president of Evanston College for Ladies in Illinois.

1871: Harriette Cooke became the first woman college professor in the United States appointed full professor with a salary equal to her male peers.

1871: Japanese women were allowed to study in the United States (though not yet in Japan itself).

1873: Linda Richards became the first American woman to earn a degree in nursing.

1877: Helen Magill White became the first American woman to earn a Ph.D., which she earned at Boston University in the subject of Greek.

1878: Mary L. Page became the first American woman to earn a degree in architecture, which she earned from the University of Illinois, Urbana-Champaign.

1879: Mary Eliza Mahoney became the first African-American in the U.S. to earn a diploma in nursing, which she earned from the School of Nursing, New England Hospital for Woman and Children in Boston.

1881: The American Association of University Women was founded.

1881: Emma Amelia Hall became the first woman to head a state institution in Michigan when she was appointed as the first superintendent of Michigan's Girls Training School, Adrian, Michigan.

1883: Susan Hayhurst became the first woman to receive a pharmacy degree in the United States, which she received from the Philadelphia College of Pharmacy.

1883: Hortense Parker became the first known African-American woman to graduate from one of the Seven Sisters colleges (Mount Holyoke College).

1883: Nettie Craig-Asberry became the first African-American woman to earn a PhD (music from the Kansas Conservatory of Music and Elocution, now part of the University of Kansas and earned one month shy of her 18th birthday)

1886: Winifred Edgerton Merrill became the first American woman to earn a PhD in mathematics, which she earned from Columbia University.

1888: Anna J. Cooper and Mary Church Terrell became the first African-American women to earn a master's degree (Oberlin College, Ohio).

1889: Maria Louise Baldwin became the first African-American female principal in Massachusetts and the Northeast, supervising white faculty and a predominantly white student body at the Agassiz Grammar School in Cambridge.

1889: Susan La Flesche Picotte became the first Native American woman to earn a medical degree, which she earned from Woman's Medical College of Pennsylvania.

1890: Ida Gray became the first African-American woman to earn a Doctor of Dental Surgery degree, which she earned from the University of Michigan.

1890: Ida Elizabeth (Bowser) Asbury became the first African-American woman to graduate from the University of Pennsylvania.

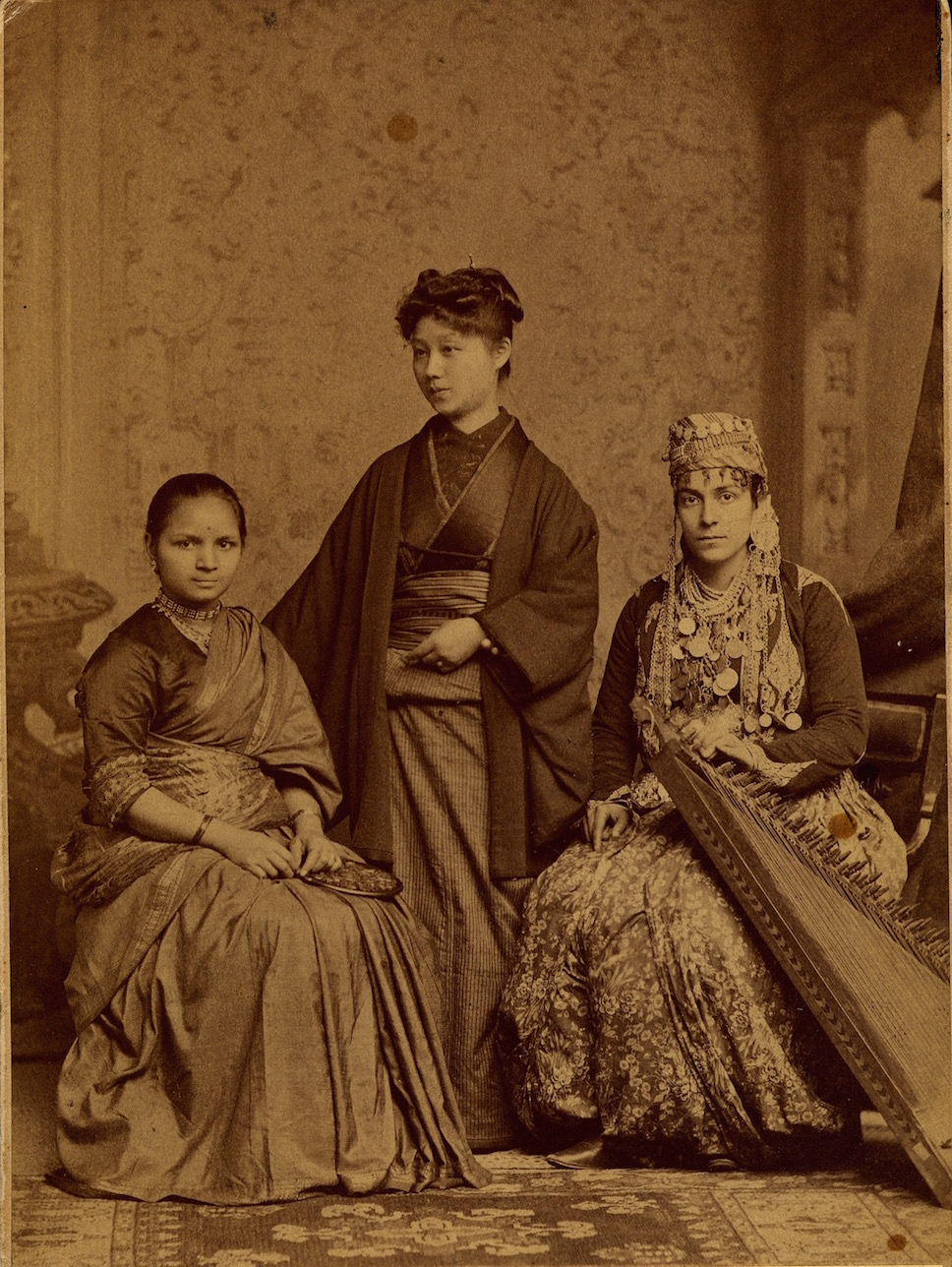
Woman's Medical College of Pennsylvania in 1886: Anandibai Joshee from India (left) with Kei Okami from Japan (center) and Sabat Islambooly from Syria (right). All three completed their medical studies and each of them was the first woman from their respective countries to obtain a degree in Western medicine.

1892: Laura Eisenhuth became the first woman elected to state office as Superintendent of Public Instruction.

1894: Margaret Floy Washburn became the first woman in the United States to be officially awarded the PhD degree in psychology, which she earned at Cornell University under E. B. Titchener.

1895: Mary Whiton Calkins became the first woman to complete the requirements for a PhD in psychology from Harvard University, although Harvard denied her the degree because it did not admit women.

1896: Minnie Braithwaite Jenkins was the first woman to attempt to take classes at the College of William & Mary but her petition was denied 4 to 3.

1896: Marie Imogene Williams became the first African-American woman dentist to graduate from Howard University's dental school

1897: Anita Florence Hemmings became the first African-American to graduate from Vassar College by passing for white.

1898: Alberta Virginia Scott became the first African-American graduate of Radcliffe College.

1899: Mary Annette Anderson became the first African-American woman elected to Phi Beta Kappa (Middlebury College in Vermont).

Late 1800s, exact date unknown: Anandibai Joshi from India, Keiko Okami from Japan, and Sabat Islambouli from Syria became the first women from their respective countries (and in Joshi's case the first Hindu woman) to get a degree in western medicine, which they each got from the Women's Medical College of Pennsylvania (WMCP), where they were all students in 1885.

=== 20th century ===
1900: Otelia Cromwell became the first African-American woman to graduate from Smith College in Northampton, Massachusetts.

1903: Mignon Nicholson became the first woman in North America to earn a veterinary degree, which she earned from McKillip Veterinary College in Chicago, Illinois.

1904: Helen Keller graduated from Radcliffe, becoming the first deafblind person in the United States to earn a Bachelor of Arts degree.

1905: Nora Stanton Blatch Barney, born in England, became the first woman to earn a degree in any type of engineering in the United States, which she earned from Cornell University. It was a degree in civil engineering.

1906: Maudelle Bousfield became the first African-American woman to graduate from the University of Illinois Urbana-Champaign (graduated with honors in three years with degrees in astronomy and mathematics).

1908: Alpha Kappa Alpha sorority, the first African-American Greek letter organization for woman, was founded at Howard University.

1909: Ella Flagg Young became the first female superintendent of a large city school system.

1915: Alice Ball became the first African American and first woman to graduate from the University of Hawaiʻi (master's degree in chemistry)

1915: Catharine Deaver Lealtad became the first African-American graduate of Macalester College (graduated with highest honors as a double major in chemistry and history).

1918: The College of William & Mary admitted 24 women to the entering undergraduate class.

1918: Nora Holt became the first African-American woman to earn a master's degree in music (from the Chicago Musical College).

1921: Sadie Tanner Mossell became the first African-American woman to earn a Ph.D. in the U.S. when she earned a Ph.D. in Economics from the University of Pennsylvania.

1921: Eva Beatrice Dykes became the first African-American student to graduate with a doctorate from Radcliffe College and the first African-American woman in America to receive a PhD in English Philology.

1921: Georgiana Rose Simpson became the first African-American woman to earn a Ph.D. in the U.S. (University of Chicago)

1922: Sigma Gamma Rho sorority was founded. It was the fourth African-American Greek letter organization for women, and the first African-American sorority established on a predominantly white campus, Butler University in Indianapolis, Indiana.

1922: Lorna Myrtle Hodgkinson became the first woman to earn a Ph.D. from Harvard, which she earned in education.

1923: Virginia Proctor Powell Florence became the first African-American woman to earn a degree in library science. She earned the degree in 1923 from the Carnegie Library School, which later became part of the University of Pittsburgh.

1924: Alma Thomas became the first person to graduate from the Howard University art department.

1925: Zora Neale Hurston became the first African-American woman to be admitted to Barnard College.

1926: Dr. May Edward Chinn became the first African-American woman to graduate from the University and Bellevue Hospital Medical College.

1927: Maudelle Bousfield became the first African-American woman principal in the Chicago Public School System.

1929: Jenny Rosenthal Bramley, born in Moscow, became the first woman to earn a Ph.D. in physics in the United States, which she earned from New York University.

1931: Jane Matilda Bolin was the first African-American woman to graduate from Yale Law School.

1932: Dorothy B. Porter became the first African-American woman to earn an advanced degree in library science (MLS) from Columbia University.

1932: Eunice Carter became the first African-American woman to receive a law degree from Fordham University in New York City.

1933: Inez Beverly Prosser became the first African-American woman to earn a doctorate in psychology (University of Cincinnati)

1935: Jesse Jarue Mark became the first African American woman to earn a Ph.D. in botany, which she earned at Iowa State University.

1936: Flemmie Kittrell became the first African American woman to earn a Ph.D. in nutrition, which she earned at Cornell University.

1937: Anna Johnson Julian became the first African-American woman to receive a Ph.D. in sociology from the University of Pennsylvania.

1937: Edith Renfrow Smith became the first African-American woman to graduate from Grinnell College, in Grinnell, Iowa.

1940: Roger Arliner Young became the first African-American woman to earn a Ph.D. in zoology, which she earned from the University of Pennsylvania.

1940: Marion Thompson Wright became the first African-American woman in the United States to earn a Ph.D. in History, which she earned at Columbia University.

1940: Eliza Atkins Gleason became the first African American to earn a doctorate in library science.

1941: Ruth Smith Lloyd became the first African-American woman to earn a Ph.D. in anatomy, which she earned from Western Reserve University.

1941: Merze Tate became the first African American woman to earn a Ph.D. in government and international relations from Harvard University.

1942: Marguerite Williams became the first African-American woman to earn a Ph.D. in geology, which she earned from Catholic University.

1943: Euphemia Haynes became the first African-American woman to earn a Ph.D. in Mathematics, which she earned from Catholic University.

1945: Harvard Medical School admitted women for the first time.

1946: Helen G. Edmonds became the first African-American woman to earn a Ph.D. degree in history from Ohio State University

1947: Marie Maynard Daly became the first African-American woman to earn a Ph.D. in chemistry, which she earned from Columbia University.

1949: Joanne Simpson (formerly Joanne Malkus, born Joanne Gerould) was the first woman in the United States to receive a Ph.D. in meteorology, which she received in 1949 from the University of Chicago.

1951: Maryly Van Leer Peck became Vanderbilt University's first chemical engineer graduate. Peck also became the first woman to receive an M.S. and a Ph.D. in chemical engineering from the University of Florida.

1952: Georgia Tech's president Blake R. Van Leer admitted the first women to the school and his wife Ella Wall Van Leer set up support groups for future female engineers.

1952: Manet Helen Fowler became the first African-American woman to earn a Ph.D. in cultural anthropology (Cornell University).

1952: Olivia P. Stokes became the first African-American woman to earn a doctorate in Religious Education.

1953: Grace Marilynn James became one of the first two African-American women on the faculty at a southern medical school and the first African American on the staff of the Louisville Children's Hospital and on the faculty at the University of Louisville School of Medicine.

1953: Louise Stokes Hunter became the first African-American woman to earn a degree at the University of Virginia

1955: Angie Turner King became the first African-American woman to earn a Ph.D. in mathematics education (University of Pittsburgh).

1956: Willa Beatrice Player became the first African-American woman to become president of a four-year, fully accredited liberal arts college (Bennett College).

1956: Pearl Payne became the first African-American woman to earn a degree from Louisiana State University (master’s degree in education).

1959: Elaine J. Coates became the first African-American woman to graduate from University of Maryland, College Park.

1960: Lillian K. Bradley became the first African-American woman to earn a doctorate in any subject at the University of Texas at Austin (mathematics education)

1962: Martha Bernal, who was born in Texas, became the first Latina to earn a PhD in psychology, which she earned in clinical psychology from Indiana University Bloomington.

1963: Grace Alele-Williams became the first Nigerian woman to earn any doctorate when she earned her Ph.D. in Mathematics Education from the University of Chicago.

1965: Sister Mary Kenneth Keller (1914? – 1985) became the first American woman to earn a PhD in Computer Science, which she earned at the University of Wisconsin–Madison. Her thesis was titled "Inductive Inference on Computer Generated Patterns."

1965: Joyce Mitchell Cook became the first African-American woman to receive a PhD degree in philosophy (Yale University)

1965: Thyrsa Frazier Svager became the first African-American woman to earn a Ph.D. in mathematics from Ohio State University.

1967: Jane C. Wright became the first African-American woman to serve as associate dean of a major medical school (New York Medical College).

1967: Ida Stephens Owens became one of the first two African American Ph.D. graduates at Duke University (the other was James Roland Law).

1967: Pinkie Gordon Lane became the first African-American woman to earn a Ph.D. from Louisiana State University.

1969: Lillian Lincoln became the first African-American woman to earn a Master of Business Administration (MBA) at Harvard Business School.

1971: Dolores Richard Spikes became the first African-American woman to earn a Ph.D. in mathematics from Louisiana State University

1972: Title IX was passed, making discrimination against any person based on their sex in any federally funded educational program(s) in America illegal.

1972: Lilia A. Abron became the first African-American woman to earn a PhD in chemical engineering (University of Iowa).

1972: Willie Hobbs Moore became the first African-American woman to earn a Ph.D. in Physics, which she earned from the University of Michigan.

1972: E. Kitch Childs became the first African-American woman to earn her doctorate degree in Human Development at the University of Chicago.

1973: Anna Coble became the first African-American woman to earn a Ph.D. in biophysics (University of Illinois at Urbana–Champaign).

1975: On July 1, 1975, Jeanne Sinkford became the first female dean of a dental school when she was appointed the dean of Howard University, School of Dentistry.

1976: U.S. service academies (US Military Academy, US Naval Academy, US Air Force Academy and the US Coast Guard Academy) first admitted women in 1976.

1976: Clara Adams-Ender became the first woman to graduate from the United States Army Command and General Staff College with a degree in military arts and sciences.

1976: Mary Frances Berry became the first African-American woman chancellor of the University of Colorado at Boulder and the first African-American woman to head a major research university.

1977: The American Association of Dental Schools (founded in 1923 and renamed the American Dental Education Association in 2000) had Nancy Goorey as its first female president in 1977.

1977–1978: For the first time, more associate degrees were conferred on women than men in the United States. More associate degrees have been conferred on women every year since.

1979: Christine Economides became the first American woman to earn a PhD in petroleum engineering, which she earned from Stanford University.

1979: Cannon v. University of Chicago, 441 U.S. 677 (1979), was a United States Supreme Court case which interpreted Congressional silence in the face of earlier interpretations of similar laws to determine that Title IX provides an implied cause of action.

1979: Jenny Patrick became the first African-American woman in the United States to earn a Ph.D. in chemical engineering, which she earned from the Massachusetts Institute of Technology.

1980: Women and men were enrolled in American colleges in equal numbers for the first time.

1980: Theresa A. Singleton became the first African-American woman to earn a doctorate in historical archaeology and African American history and culture from the University of Florida.

1981: Barbara A. Williams became the first African-American woman to earn a PhD in astronomy (University of Maryland, College Park)

1981: Deborah Washington Brown became the first African-American woman to earn a Ph.D. in computer science from Harvard University (at the time the degree was part of the applied mathematics program).

1981–1982: For the first time, more bachelor's degrees were conferred on women than men in the United States. More bachelor's degrees have been conferred on women every year since.

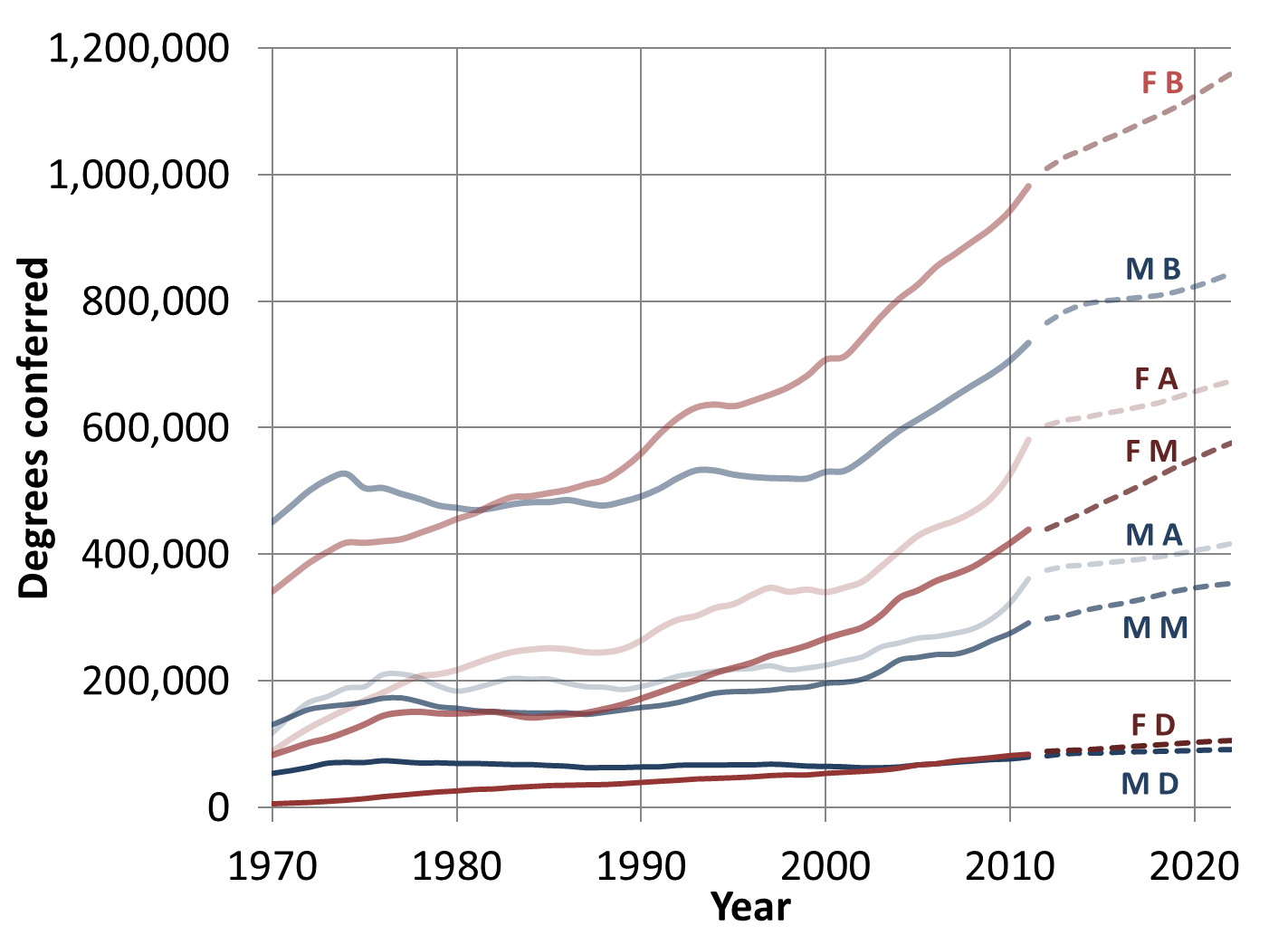
Degrees conferred in United States since 1970 by year, degree type, and gender. Dashed lines are projected. Since 1982 more bachelor's degrees have been conferred on women.

1982: Judith Hauptman earned her PhD in Talmudic studies from the Jewish Theological Seminary of New York, thus making her the first woman to earn a PhD in Talmud.

1982: Mississippi University for Women v. Hogan, 458 U.S. 718 (1982) was a case decided 5–4 by the Supreme Court of the United States. The court held that the single-sex admissions policy of the Mississippi University for Women violated the Equal Protection Clause of the Fourteenth Amendment to the United States Constitution.

1982: North Haven Board of Education v. Bell, 456 U.S. 512 (1982), was a U.S. Supreme Court decision where the Court ruled that Title IX protections against sex-based discrimination applied to school employees as well as students within a federal funded education setting. Critically, this decision was made in contrast to many previous court rulings on the application of Title IX to individuals other than students. The decision of North Haven Board of Education v. Bell ushered in an understanding of Title IX that protects anyone interacting with the school system including “parents and guardians, students, applicants and employees." The employee protection of Title IX extends to both full and part-time faculty, dictating that equal pay must be given to men and women for the same work.

1982: Clara Adams-Ender became the first African-American Nurse Corps officer in the Army to graduate from the U.S. Army War College.

1982: M. Deborrah Hyde became the first African American and first woman to complete a neurosurgery residency at Case Western University, and the second African-American woman certified by the American Board of Neurological Surgery.

1982: Marsha Rhea Williams became the first African-American woman to earn a Ph.D. in computer science (Vanderbilt University).

1983: Christine Darden became the first African-American woman in the U.S. to earn a Ph.D. degree in mechanical engineering, which she earned from George Washington University.

1984: The U.S. Supreme Court's 1984 ruling Grove City College v. Bell held that Title IX applied only to those programs receiving direct federal aid. The case reached the Supreme Court when Grove City College disagreed with the Department of Education's assertion that it was required to comply with Title IX. Grove City College was not a federally funded institution; however, they did accept students who were receiving Basic Educational Opportunity Grants through a Department of Education program. The Department of Education's stance was that, because some of its students were receiving federal grants, the school was receiving federal assistance and Title IX applied to it. The Court decided that since Grove City College was only receiving federal funding through the grant program, only that program had to be in compliance. The ruling was a major victory for those opposed to Title IX, as it made many institutions' sports programs outside of the rule of Title IX and, thus, reduced the scope of Title IX.

1985: Daphne L. Smith became the first African-American woman to earn a Ph.D. in mathematics at the Massachusetts Institute of Technology (MIT).

1986–1987: For the first time, more master's degrees were conferred on women than men in the United States. More master's degrees have been conferred on women every year since.

1987: Johnnetta Cole became the first African-American woman president of Spelman College.

1988: The Civil Rights Restoration Act of 1987 was passed in 1988, which extended Title IX coverage to all programs of any educational institution that receives any federal assistance, both direct and indirect.

1988: Diana L. Hayes became the first African-American woman to earn a Doctor of Sacred Theology (Catholic University of Louvain Belgium).

1988: Sandra Johnson became the first African-American woman to earn a doctorate in electrical engineering at Rice University

1989: Renita J. Weems became the first African-American woman to earn a Ph.D. in Old Testament Studies (Princeton Theological Seminary).

1991: Dorceta Taylor became the first African-American woman to earn a Ph.D. from the Yale University School of Forestry and Environmental Studies.

1991: Kesho Y. Scott became the first African-American woman to receive tenure at Grinnell College.

1992: Franklin v. Gwinnett County Public Schools, 503 U.S. 60 (1992), was a Supreme Court of the United States Case in which the Court decided, in a unanimous vote, that monetary relief is available under Title IX.

1993: Barbara Ross-Lee became the first African-American woman dean of a United States medical school (Heritage College of Osteopathic Medicine of Ohio University)

1994: Judith Rodin became the first permanent female president of an Ivy League University (specifically, the University of Pennsylvania.)

1994: In 1994, the Equity in Athletics Disclosure Act, sponsored by congresswoman Cardiss Collins, required federally assisted higher education institutions to disclose information on roster sizes for men's and women's teams, as well as budgets for recruiting, scholarships, coaches' salaries, and other expenses, annually.

1994: Eve Higginbotham became the first African-American woman chair of a university department of ophthalmology (University of Maryland School of Medicine).

1995: Mildred Barnes Griggs became the first African-American dean of the University of Illinois College of Education.

1995: Gloria Conyers Hewitt became the first African-American woman to chair a math department in the United States (University of Montana).

1996: United States v. Virginia, 518 U.S. 515 (1996), was a landmark case in which the Supreme Court of the United States struck down the Virginia Military Institute (VMI)'s long-standing male-only admission policy in a 7–1 decision. (Justice Clarence Thomas, whose son was enrolled at VMI at the time, recused himself.)

1996: National Collegiate Athletic Association v. Smith, 525 U.S. 459 (1999), was a case in which the Supreme Court of the United States ruled that the NCAA's receipt of dues payments from colleges and universities which received federal funds, was not sufficient to subject the NCAA to a lawsuit under Title IX.

1998: Fannie Gaston-Johansson became the first African-American woman tenured professor at Johns Hopkins University.

1999: Shirley Ann Jackson became the first African-American woman to lead a top-ranked research university when named the 18th president of Rensselaer Polytechnic Institute.

1999: Tracey Meares became the first African-American woman to earn tenure at the University of Chicago Law School.

=== 21st century ===
2001: Ruth Simmons became the eighteenth president of Brown University, which made her the first African-American woman to lead an Ivy League institution.

2004–2005: For the first time, more doctoral degrees were conferred on women than men in the U.S. More doctoral degrees have been conferred on women every year since. As of 2011, among adults 25 and older, 10.6 million U.S. women have master's degrees or higher, compared to 10.5 million men. Measured by shares, about 10.2 percent of women have advanced degrees compared to 10.9 percent of men—a gap steadily narrowing in recent years. Women still trail men in professional subcategories such as business, science and engineering, but when it comes to finishing college, roughly 20.1 million women have bachelor's degrees, compared to nearly 18.7 million men—a gap of more than 1.4 million that has remained steady in recent years.

2006: Jackson v. Birmingham Board of Education, 544 U.S. 167 (2005), was a case in which the United States Supreme Court held that retaliation against a person because that person has complained of sex discrimination is a form of intentional sex discrimination encompassed by Title IX.

2006: On November 24, 2006, the Title IX regulations were amended to provide greater flexibility in the operation of single-sex classes or extracurricular activities at the primary or secondary school level.

2006: Mitzi J. Smith became the first African-American woman to earn a PhD in New Testament from Harvard University.

2006: Jami Valentine became the first African-American woman to graduate with a PhD in physics from Johns Hopkins University in Baltimore, Maryland.

2007: Tracey Meares became the first African-American woman to earn tenure at Yale Law School.

2008: Evelynn M. Hammonds became the first African American and the first woman to be appointed dean of Harvard College.

2008: Julianne Pollard-Larkin became the first African-American woman to earn her PhD in Biomedical Physics at University of California, Los Angeles (UCLA).

2009: Fitzgerald v. Barnstable School Committee, 555 U.S. 246 (2009), was a case in which the United States Supreme Court held that parents could sue a school committee under grounds of the Equal Protection Clause of the 14th Amendment.

2010: Nia Imara became the first African-American woman to earn a Ph.D. in astrophysics at the University of California, Berkeley.

2011: Monica Cox became the first African-American woman to earn tenure in engineering at Purdue University

2014: Joanne Berger-Sweeney became the first woman and the first African American to lead Trinity College (Connecticut).

2014: Jedidah Isler became the first African-American woman to complete her PhD in astrophysics at Yale University.

2016: Paula Johnson became the first African American to serve as president of Wellesley College.

== See also ==
- Coeducation
- Educational inequality
- Education in the United States
- Female seminary
- History of education in the United States
- List of girls' schools in the United States
- Normal schools in the United States, for training teachers
- Timeline of women's colleges in the United States
- Women's colleges in the United States
