= Hudson Middle School =

Hudson Middle School may refer to:

- Hudson Middle School - Pasco County Schools - Hudson, Florida
- Hudson Middle School - Hudson City School District (Ohio) - Hudson, Ohio
- B. G. Hudson Middle School - Garland Independent School District - Sachse, Texas
- Hudson Middle School - Hudson Independent School District - Hudson, Texas, near Lufkin
