= Hudson High School =

Hudson High School can refer to:

- Hudson High School (Florida) in Hudson, FL
- Hudson High School (Iowa) in Hudson, IA
- Hudson High School (Massachusetts) in Hudson, MA
- Hudson High School (Michigan) in Hudson, MI
- Hudson High School (New York) in Hudson, NY
- Hudson High School (Ohio) in Hudson, OH
- Hudson High School (Texas) in Lufkin, TX
- Hudson High School (Wisconsin) in Hudson, WI
- Hudson High School (Quebec), the former name of a high school in Hudson, Quebec, Canada
