= Brandon Belt =

American baseball player (born 1988)

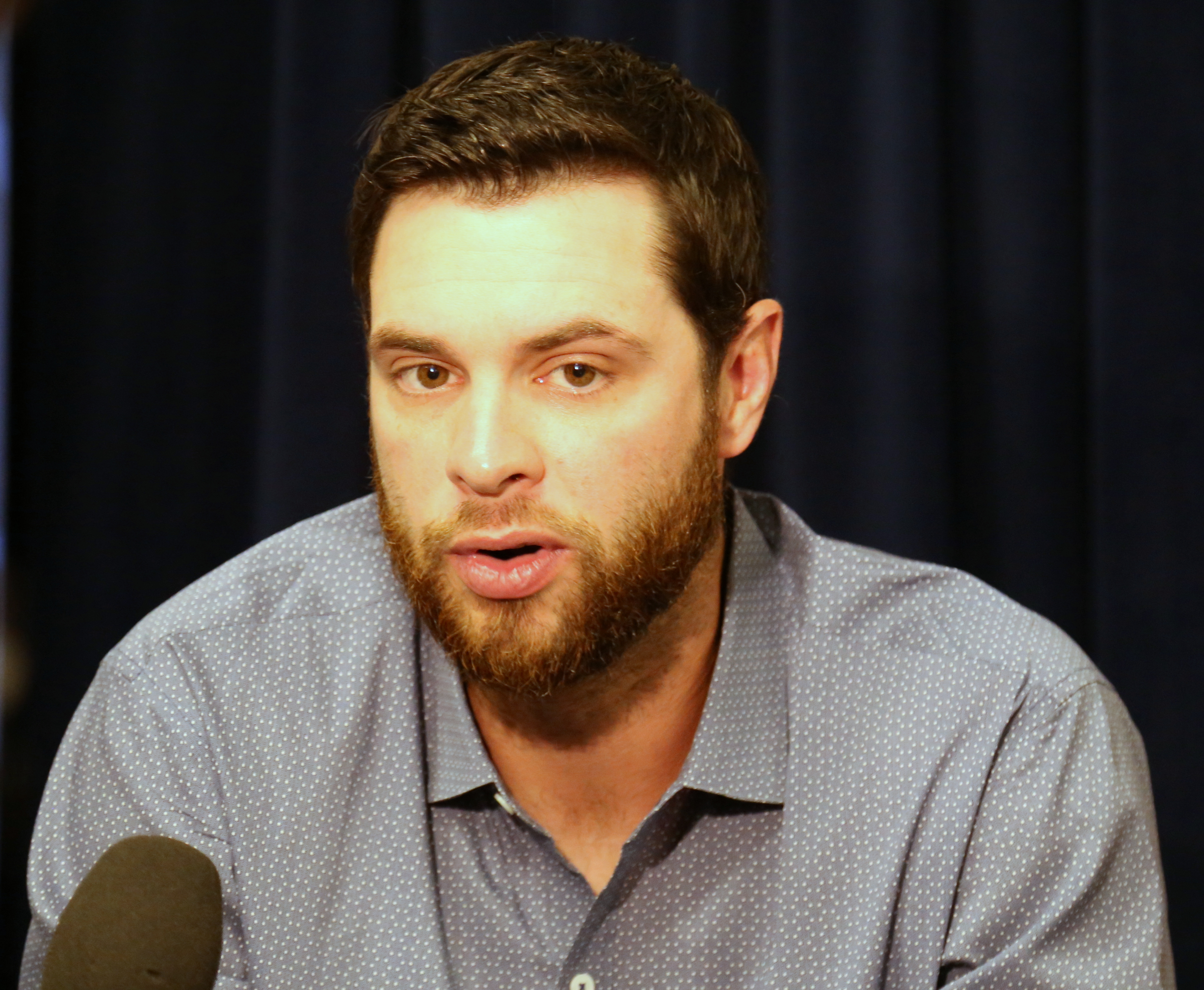
- Belt before the 2016 MLB All-Star Game
- First baseman
- Born: April 20, 1988 (age 38); Nacogdoches, Texas, U.S.
- Batted: Left Threw: Left

MLB debut
- March 31, 2011, for the San Francisco Giants

Last MLB appearance
- October 1, 2023, for the Toronto Blue Jays

MLB statistics
- Batting average: .261
- Hits: 1,232
- Home runs: 194
- Runs batted in: 627
- Stats at Baseball Reference

Teams
- San Francisco Giants (2011–2022); Toronto Blue Jays (2023)

Career highlights and awards
- All-Star (2016); 2× World Series champion (2012, 2014); San Francisco Giants Wall of Fame

Brandon Kyle Belt (born April 20, 1988), nicknamed "Baby Giraffe", "Sparky", and "Captain", is an American former professional baseball first baseman. He has previously played in Major League Baseball (MLB) for the San Francisco Giants and Toronto Blue Jays. He was a member of the 2012 World Series and 2014 World Series championship teams with the Giants and an All Star in 2016.

Belt played college baseball for the San Jacinto Central Ravens and Texas Longhorns. He was selected by the Giants in the fifth round of the 2009 MLB draft, and made his MLB debut in 2011. After 12 seasons with the Giants, he signed with the Blue Jays as a free agent in 2023.

== Early life ==
Belt was born on April 20, 1988, in Nacogdoches, Texas. Belt attended Hudson High School in Hudson, Texas, where he was a pitcher and outfielder. The Boston Red Sox selected Belt in the 11th round (343rd overall) of the 2006 Major League Baseball draft as a pitcher, but chose not to offer him the signing bonus that would make him forego his college commitment.

== College career ==
Belt enrolled at San Jacinto College to preserve his ability to negotiate with Boston but eventually chose not to sign. He pitched and served as a designated hitter for San Jacinto's college baseball team in 2007. He was drafted in the 11th round (348th overall) of the 2007 Major League Baseball draft by the Atlanta Braves but again chose not to sign.

Belt transferred to the University of Texas, where he played for the Longhorns for two years. In his 2008 sophomore season, Belt batted .319 with six home runs and a team-high 65 runs batted in (RBI) while also pitching in 16 games as a reliever. After the 2008 season, he played collegiate summer baseball with the Harwich Mariners of the Cape Cod Baseball League. As a junior, Belt transitioned to first base due to shoulder problems. In 2009, during his junior season, Belt batted .323 in 63 games with eight home runs, 43 RBI, and 15 stolen bases as part of the Texas team that finished as runner-up in the College World Series.

== Professional career ==
=== Draft and minor leagues ===
The San Francisco Giants selected Belt in the fifth round (147th overall) of the 2009 Major League Baseball draft after his junior year. He signed and received a signing bonus of $200,000. He started his professional career with the High-A Giants affiliate in San Jose, for whom he was a mid-season All Star. He worked with the Giants coaching staff and made an adjustment to his swing mechanics that helped him move quickly through the Giants farm system. He hit well at all three levels in 2010, finishing the year batting .352/.455/.620 with 23 home runs and 112 RBI, gaining attention as one of the Giants top prospects.

In 2010, he played for the Triple-A Fresno Grizzlies, and was named a Baseball America Minor League All Star and an MiLB Organization All Star. He also played for the East Division Scottsdale Scorpions in the Arizona Fall League, where he was named a Rising Star and to the All Prospect Team. Belt played in the Arizona Fall League Rising Stars Game for the East team.

He was ranked as the third-best first baseman prospect on MLB.com prior to the 2011 season. He was ranked as the 26th-best prospect overall by MLB.com.

=== San Francisco Giants (2011–2022) ===
==== 2011 ====
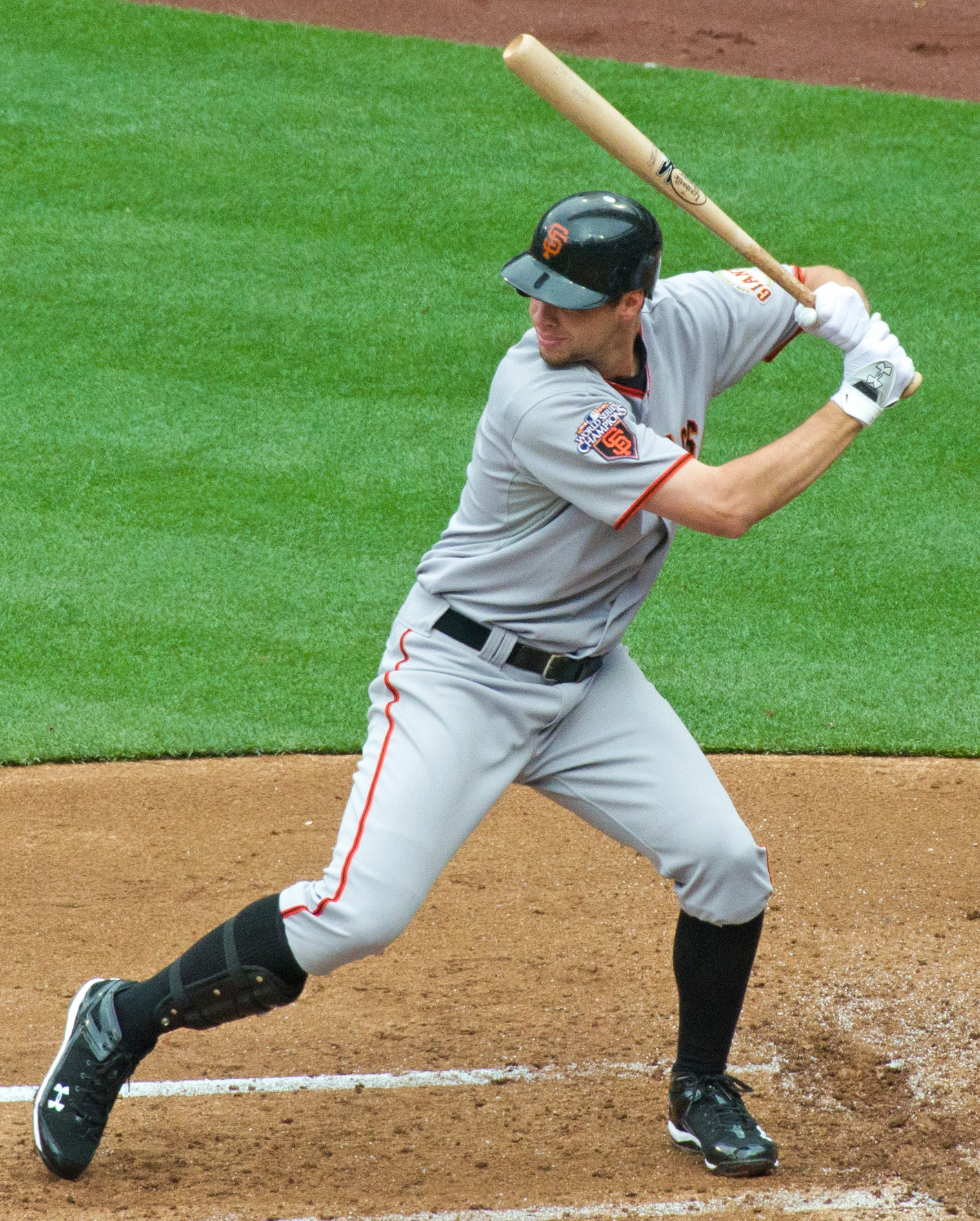
Belt batting in 2011

After his strong showing in the minor leagues, Belt was invited to spring training in 2011, where he played in 28 exhibition games, the most on the team, and batted .282 with 3 home runs. On March 30, the Giants announced that Belt had been named to the opening day major league roster, a moment captured in the series premiere of The Franchise. He started in his first major league game the next day and singled off of Los Angeles Dodgers pitcher Clayton Kershaw in his first major league at bat, finishing 1-for-3 with a walk. Belt hit his first major league home run on April 1, 2011, off Chad Billingsley. On April 20, Belt was optioned to Triple-A Fresno to make room on the roster for Cody Ross. He was hitting .192 in 17 games. Belt was recalled to the Giants on May 26 after injuries to Buster Posey and Darren Ford. On June 4, Belt was diagnosed with a hairline fracture in his wrist after being hit by a pitch in a game against the St. Louis Cardinals, sending him to the 15 day disabled list (DL). On July 7, Belt was removed from the DL and optioned back to Fresno to continue his rehab assignment.

On July 19, Belt was recalled to the Giants to give slumping first baseman Aubrey Huff a break. In his first game back in the majors, Belt hit a solo home run in the second inning and a tiebreaking two-run double in the seventh to help the Giants defeat the Dodgers. On August 4, Belt was optioned back to Fresno to make room on the roster for Mark DeRosa. On August 14, one day after being called up to the majors for a fourth time, Belt hit two home runs in a 5–2 victory over the Florida Marlins in Miami. It was the first multi-home run game of his career.

In August 2011, Belt was given the nickname "The Baby Giraffe" by Giants announcer Duane Kuiper, who commented that Belt looked like the animal while tracking down a fly ball in left field during a game against the Milwaukee Brewers. The nickname stuck and Belt became a fan favorite in San Francisco, with "Baby Giraffe" hats rivaling the number of "Panda" hats in the stands at AT&T Park in September 2011 (the panda hats a reference to then-Giants star Pablo Sandoval, nicknamed "Kung Fu Panda"). Six Flags Discovery Kingdom named a baby giraffe born in August after Belt.

==== 2012 ====
Belt made the Giants' opening day roster for 2012. Belt split time at first base with Aubrey Huff and Brett Pill at the beginning of the season. Belt caught the final out of Matt Cain's perfect game that was thrown to him at first base from third baseman Joaquín Arias. After Huff was injured and Pill struggled at the plate, Belt became the everyday first baseman and finished the season strong, hitting .328 from July 24 to the end of the season.

In the NLCS, Belt hit .304 (7-for-23) in six games with a .565 slugging percentage. On October 28, Belt won his first World Series title when the Giants swept the Detroit Tigers. He played a key part of the Giants' clinching game in the World Series, starting the scoring by hitting a triple to right field in the second inning, scoring Hunter Pence from second.

==== 2013 ====
Belt set new career highs in 2013, batting .289 with 17 home runs and 67 RBI during 150 games, and he led the Giants with an .841 on-base plus slugging (OPS). Belt got off to a slow start after losing 11 pounds to an opening-week stomach virus, but finished strong, batting .346 over the season's final 51 games. Belt credited his improvement to changing his grip and moving back in the batter's box. Belt was named National League Player of the Week for August 5–11 after collecting hits in all seven games played, while batting .440 (11-for-25) with five RBI, 20 total bases, two home runs, and eight runs scored.

==== 2014 ====
On February 1, 2014, Belt signed a one-year $2.9 million contract to avoid arbitration. On May 9, Belt was hit by a pitch from Dodgers pitcher Paul Maholm, resulting in a broken left thumb and trip to the DL. Belt was activated from the DL on July 4, only to return to the DL on July 21 after suffering a concussion while fielding during batting practice. Belt was activated August 2, but was placed on the DL again August 8 when his concussion symptoms continued. Belt returned to the Giants on September 15.

In the postseason, Belt batted .295 (18-for-61) with 8 RBI and 11 walks in 17 games. In Game 2 of the NLDS against the Washington Nationals, he hit a solo home run in the top of the 18th inning to break a 1–1 tie after 6 hours and 23 minutes of game play, helping the Giants to an eventual 3–1 series win. On October 29, Belt won his second World Series championship when the Giants defeated the Kansas City Royals in seven games. Belt and teammate Hunter Pence hit safely in all seven games of the series, the only players on either team to do so.

==== 2015 ====
On February 3, 2015, Belt and the Giants avoided arbitration by agreeing to a one-year, $3.6 million contract. On May 17, Belt accomplished a rare feat when he collected 3 hits, including a home run, for 3 games in a row against the Cincinnati Reds. He was only the second Giants player to do so since 1900. Barry Bonds had a similar three-game streak in 2000. Belt recorded another unusual statistic since he hit the home runs on 3 consecutive days after not hitting any in his first 30 games. Belt was last player to have done so, when he hit home runs in 3 consecutive games after not hitting any in his first 48 games in 2012.

In 2015, Belt appeared in 137 games, batting .280/.356/.478, and set new career-highs with 18 home runs and 68 RBI. He led all major league hitters in line drive percentage (28.7%).

==== 2016 ====
On February 10, 2016, Belt and the Giants agreed to a one-year, $6.2 million contract to avoid arbitration. On April 9, Belt and the Giants agreed to a 5-year, $72.8 million contract extension through 2021. After winning the National League All-Star Final Vote, Belt was selected to his only All Star Game.

In 2016, Belt led the Giants with 104 walks, 17 home runs, a .394 on-base percentage, and .868 OPS, and set a new career-high with 82 RBI. Belt became the first Giant to record 100 walks in a season since Barry Bonds in 2007. He had the lowest ground ball percentage of all major league hitters (26.3%). He hit poorly in his third postseason, batting 2-for-17 with 2 RBI as the Giants lost to the Chicago Cubs in the NLDS.

==== 2017 ====
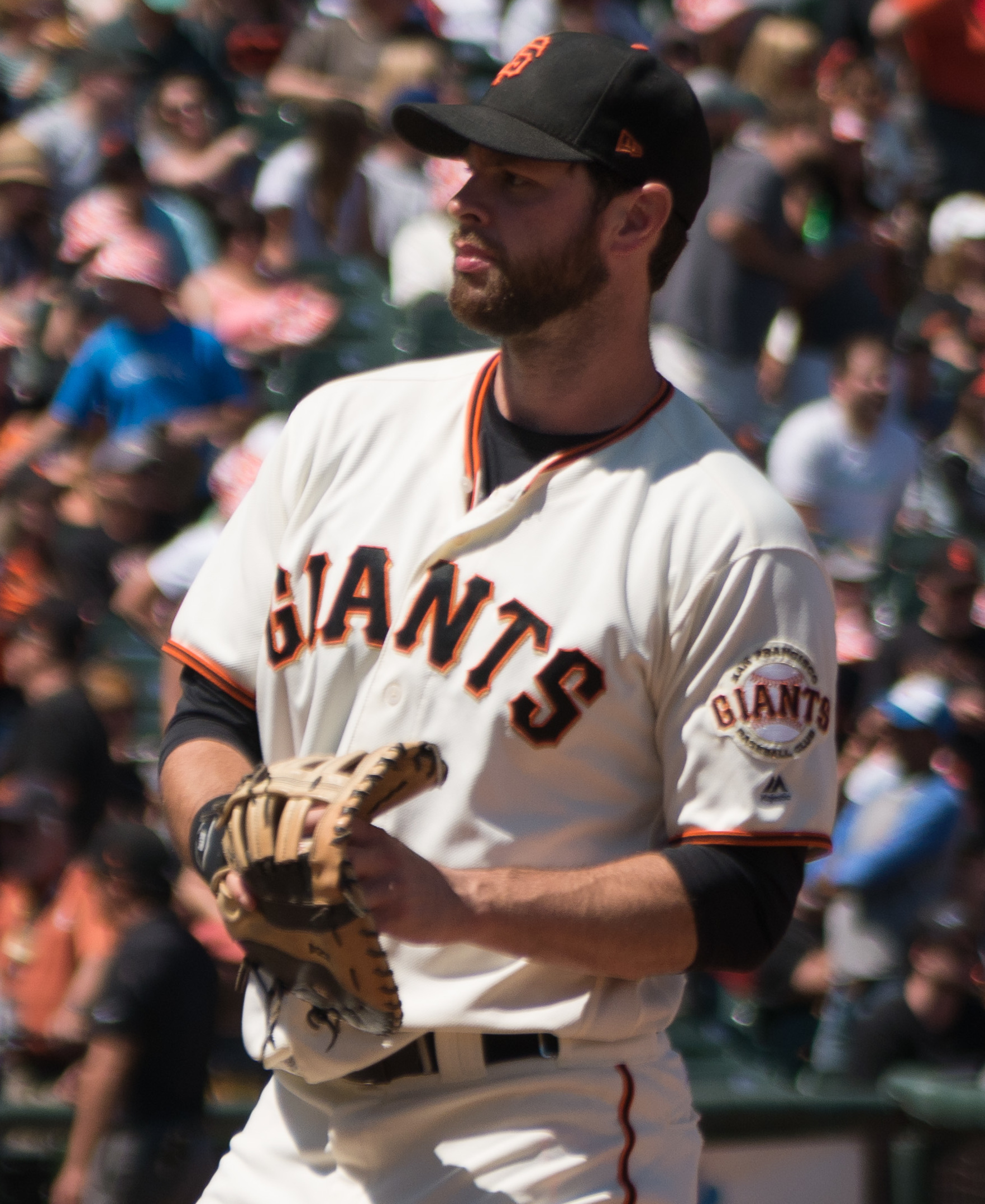
Belt in the field in 2017

In 2017, Belt tied his then-career-high with 18 home runs before suffering a season-ending concussion on August 4.

==== 2018 ====
On April 22, Belt set a new MLB record for most pitches seen in one at bat, with 21 against the Angels' starting pitcher, Jaime Barría. Belt fouled off 16 pitches (15 with two strikes) against the right-hander in his first plate appearance of the game, in the top of the first inning. The at bat lasted 12 minutes and 45 seconds and ended with a fly out to right fielder Kole Calhoun. Belt was also named the National League Player of the Week on May 21. On June 2, Belt underwent an appendectomy. In 2018, he batted .253/.342/.414 with 14 home runs and 46 RBI.

==== 2019 ====
In 2019, Belt hit .234/.339/.403 with 76 runs, 17 home runs, and 57 RBI. He had the lowest ground ball percentage in the National League (28.3%).

==== 2020 ====
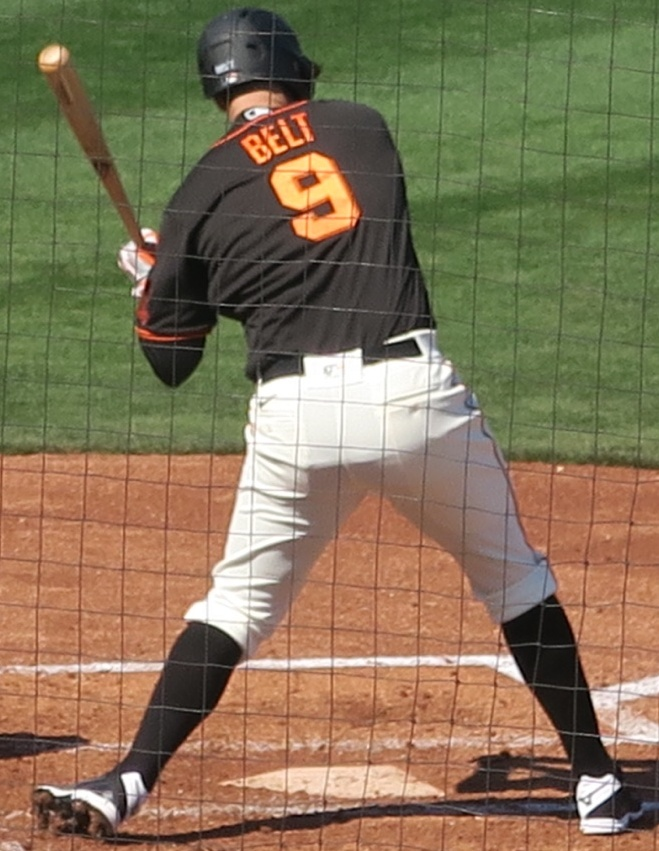
Belt batting in February 2020

In the pandemic-shortened 2020 season, Belt batted .309/.425/.591 with 9 home runs and 30 RBI in 51 games. He had the fourth-highest OPS in the National League (1.015).

==== 2021 ====
In 2021, Belt batted .274/.378/.597 with 59 RBI, and a career high 29 home runs in 381 plate appearances. He became a free agent after the season but accepted the Giants $18.4 million qualifying offer for the 2022 season.

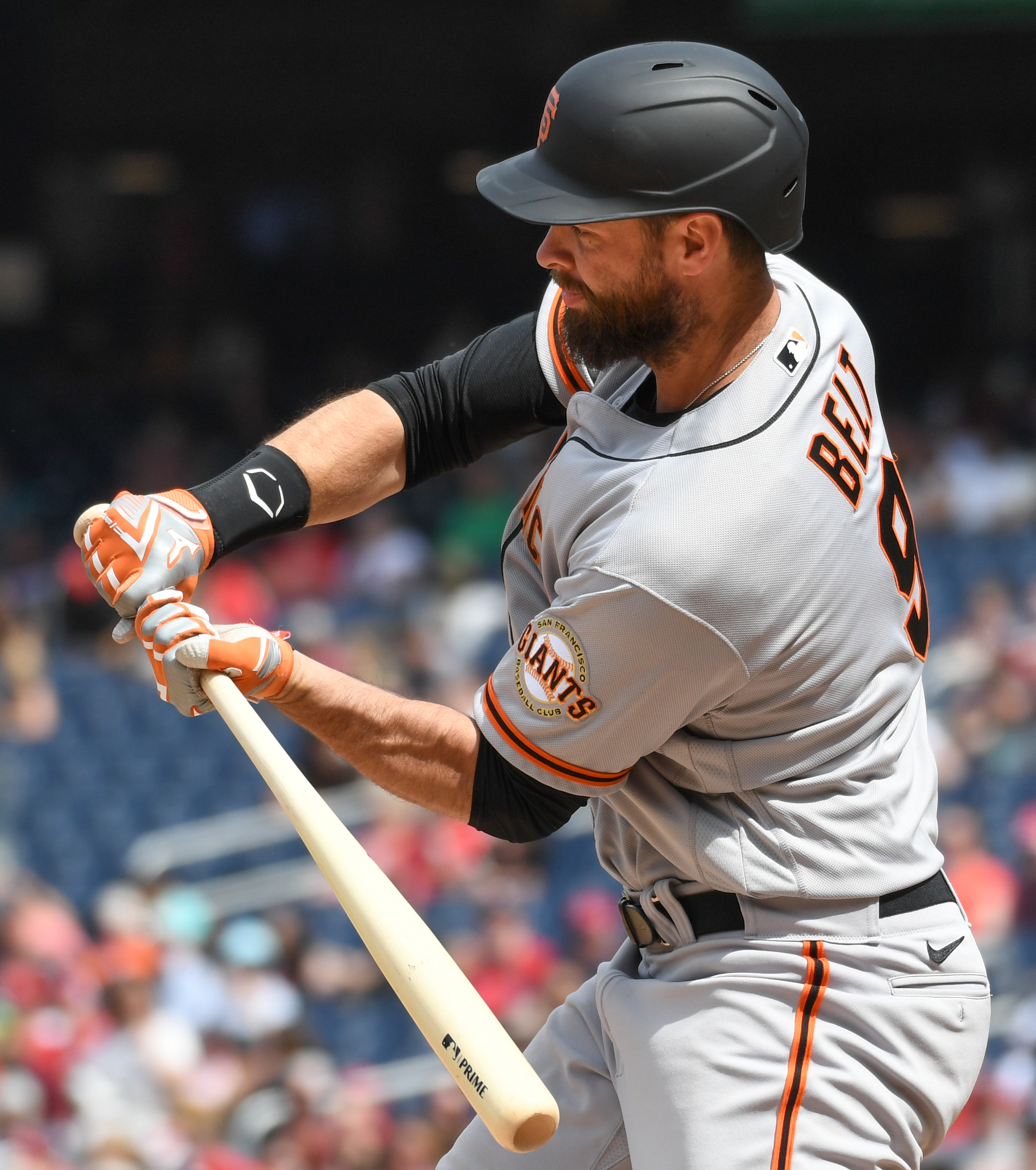
Belt batting in 2022

==== 2022 ====
Following the retirement of Buster Posey, Belt became the longest tenured member of the Giants. In 2022, Belt batted .213/.326/.350 in 298 plate appearances. He had the slowest sprint speed of all Giants players, at 24.3 feet per second. Belt underwent season-ending surgery on September 2 to repair cartilage in his right knee.

=== Toronto Blue Jays (2023) ===
On January 10, 2023, Belt signed a one-year contract worth $9.3 million with the Toronto Blue Jays. He batted .254/.369/.490 with 19 home runs in 103 games for Toronto. He served mostly as a platoon designated hitter, facing primarily right-handed pitchers. He went 0-for-8 with five strikeouts in the AL Wild Card Series against the Minnesota Twins.

Belt became a free agent after the season. He received only one guaranteed contract offer, which he called "baffling" given his 2023 performance, but he did not sign with a team for the 2024, 2025 or 2026 seasons.

== Career accomplishments ==
=== Championships ===
Title	Times	Dates
National League champion	2	2012, 2014
World Series champion	2	2012, 2014

=== Awards and honors ===
Name of award	Times	Dates
MLB All-Star	1	2016
MLB Player of the Week	2	August 11, 2013; May 18, 2018

== Personal life ==
Belt married his high school sweetheart Haylee Stephenson on December 3, 2010, in their hometown of Lufkin, Texas. They have two sons, born in 2014 and 2018.

Belt founded Brandon Belt Fishing, which hosts big bass fishing tournaments. Their mission will be to raise money for Harold's House, a nonprofit that serves victims of sexual and/or physical abuse.
