= Apple Springs High School =

Location
- 9102 FM 2501; Apple Springs, Texas 75926-0125; United States; 31.2251°N 94.9706°W

Information
- School type: Public high school
- School district: Apple Springs Independent School District
- Principal: Kevin Plotts
- Teaching staff: 9.09 (FTE)
- Grades: 7-12
- Enrollment: 98 (2023–2024)
- Student to teacher ratio: 10.87
- Colors: Black, navy, and white
- Athletics conference: UIL Class A
- Mascot: Eagle/Lady Eagle
- Yearbook: The Eagle
- Website: Apple Springs High School

Apple Springs High School is a public high school located in Apple Springs, Texas, United States. It is part of the Apple Springs Independent School District located in northeast Trinity County.

It is classified as a 1A school by the UIL.

For the 2024-2025 school year, the school received an overall rating of "D" from the Texas Education Agency.

== Unique relationship ==
The school has a unique relationship with the nearby Hudson Independent School District. Apple Springs participates in six-man football but does not offer a band program, while Hudson has a band but does not participate in football. As such, the Hudson band participates at Apple Springs games. The unusual relationship was filmed by the crew of the Texas Country Reporter.

== Athletics ==
The Apple Springs Eagles compete in cross country, volleyball, six-man football, basketball, track, softball, and baseball.

=== State titles ===
- Baseball
  - 1988(1A)
