= Mackenroth =

Mackenroth is a surname. Notable people with the surname include:

- Anna Mackenroth, (born 1861), born in Germany, was Zurich's first practicing female lawyer
- Jack Mackenroth (born 1969), American swimmer, model and fashion designer
- Terry Mackenroth (born 1949), Australian politician
