= Hudson High School (Texas) =

Location
- 6735 Ted Trout Drive; Lufkin, Angelina County, Texas 75904-6641; United States; 31.324425°N 94.789247°W

Information
- School type: Public, high school
- Locale: Town: Remote
- School district: Hudson ISD
- NCES School ID: 482379002631
- Principal: Ryan Westbrook
- Teaching staff: 60.44 (on an FTE basis)
- Grades: 9–12
- Enrollment: 787 (2023–2024)
- Student to teacher ratio: 13.02
- Colors: Maroon, White & Black
- Athletics conference: University Interscholastic League Class AAAA
- Mascot: Hornet/Lady Hornet
- Yearbook: Hornet
- Website: Hudson High School

Hudson High School is a public high school located just outside Lufkin, Texas (USA) and classified as a 4A school by the University Interscholastic League. It is part of the Hudson Independent School District located in central Angelina County. During 2023–2024, Hudson High School had an enrollment of 787 students and a student to teacher ratio of 13.02. The school received an overall rating of "A" from the Texas Education Agency for the 2024–2025 school year.

== Athletics ==
The Hudson Hornets compete in the following sports:

- Baseball
- Basketball
- Cheer
- Cross Country
- Hudson Highlights
- Golf
- Soccer
- Special Olympics
- Swim
- Softball
- Tennis
- Track and Field
- Volleyball

== Hudson A/V ==
Hudson Audiovisual is a CTE that provides students with an understanding of how Audio and Visual work in the real world. This class first teaches students how to work standardized A/V equipment such as cameras, microphones, audio interfaces, lighting equipment, etc. As well as teaching students, this class provides students in Hudson A/V with real-world expertise. The class has created many documentaries as well as fictional short films. They have also won numerous awards in the UIL Young Filmmakers competition. Along with this, they also go out into the community just as an a/v company would film a variety of events, such as Dancing with the Stars.

=== State titles ===
- Girls Softball -
  - 2012(3A), 2013(3A)

== Notable alumni ==
- Brandon Belt, first baseman for the San Francisco Giants and Toronto Blue Jays

== Electives and special programs ==
In December 2021, Stephen F. Austin State University (SFA) announced Hudson High School as a Distinguished High School Program partner. With this, SFA began providing Hudson students with scholarship opportunities if they choose to attend the university.

Hudson High School provides the following special courses for its students to take

- Aeronautics
- Hudson A/V (Audiovisual)
- Agricultural Science
- Art
- Band
- Choir
- Computer Science
- Cosmetology
- Culinary Arts
- Dual Credit Courses at AC
- Esports
- Floral Design
- Hornet Academy (ECHS)
- Nursing
- Photography
- Theatre Arts
- Welding
- Yearbook

== Advanced Placement courses ==
At Hudson High School, numerous Advanced Placement courses are offered by the College Board. These include:

- AP Calculus AB
- AP Chemistry
- AP English Language and Composition
- AP Psychology
- AP Spanish Language and Culture
- AP United States History

== Band ==
The school's band has a unique relationship with the nearby Apple Springs Independent School District.

Apple Springs participates in six-man football but does not offer a band program, while Hudson has a band but does not participate in football. Therefore, the Hudson band participates at Apple Springs games. The unusual relationship was filmed by the crew of the popular Texas Country Reporter.
