= Apple Springs, Texas =

Apple Springs
- Unincorporated community
- Location within the state of Texas Apple Springs (the United States)
- Coordinates: 31°13′25″N 94°57′59″W
- Country: United States
- State: Texas
- County: Trinity
- Time zone: UTC-6 (Central (CST))
  - Summer (DST): UTC-5 (CDT)
- ZIP code: 75926
- Area code: 936
- GNIS feature ID: 1381331

Apple Springs is an unincorporated community in Trinity County, Texas, United States. According to the Handbook of Texas, the community had a population of 185 in 2000. It is located within the Huntsville, Texas micropolitan area.

== History ==
The town was founded shortly after the Civil War as May Apple Springs. The community took its name from a nearby spring where May apples grew. A post office has been in operation at Apple Springs since 1884. The community moved to the location of the Groveton, Lufkin and Northern Railway when a track was built between Groveton and Vair. Apple Springs had 75 residents during World War I and had three general stores, a gin, a bank, and a cafe. The railroad was abandoned in 1931 and the community moved to State Highway 94. In the mid-1930s, Apple Springs had 12 businesses and 150 residents. The town rose to a population of 285 in 1965, and then progressively declined to about 130 people, with nine businesses, in the 1990s. In 2000, the population was 185 with 21 businesses.

On January 19, 1990, a strong F3 tornado damaged around 20 homes, overturned a mobile home and shifted it around 70 feet, and snapped several power poles.

== Geography ==
Apple Springs is located at the intersection of Texas State Highway 94 and Farm to Market Roads 357 and 2501, 15 mi (24 km) northeast of Groveton and 20 mi (32 km) southwest of Lufkin in northeastern Trinity County.

== Schools ==
The community's first school was established in 1884 and had only 28 students enrolled two years later.

Apple Springs is home to Apple Springs Independent School District. The district has two schools, Apple Springs Elementary School (pre-kindergarten to grade 6) and Apple Springs High School (grades 7 to 12), with approximately 140-165 students. In 2004–2005, the school district received an "Academically Acceptable" rating from the Texas Education Agency (TEA). In 2002, Apple Springs High School was recognized by Texas Monthly as one of the top ten high schools in Texas in its economic group, based on ranking by the National Center for Educational Accountability.

== Economy ==
Brookshire Brothers has a store in Apple Springs.

== Notable person ==
Jesse Jarue Mark, African American who earned a Ph.D. in botany, was born in the community.
