= Hudson, Texas =

- City
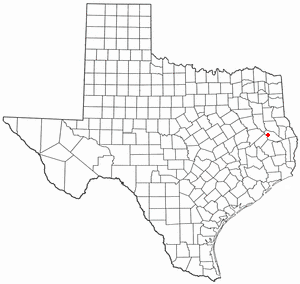
- Location of Hudson, Texas

- Coordinates: 31°18′47″N 94°48′18″W
- Country: United States
- State: Texas
- County: Angelina

Area
  - Total: 5.11 sq mi (13.23 km^{2})
  - Land: 5.07 sq mi (13.13 km^{2})
  - Water: 0.039 sq mi (0.10 km^{2})
- Elevation: 285 ft (87 m)

Population (2020)
  - Total: 4,849
  - Density: 987.3/sq mi (381.18/km^{2})
- Time zone: UTC-6 (Central (CST))
  - Summer (DST): UTC-5 (CDT)
- Zip Code: 75904
- FIPS code: 48-35228
- GNIS feature ID: 2410800
- Website: hudsontx.com

Hudson is a city in Angelina County, Texas, United States. The population was 4,731 at the 2020 census.

== Geography ==
Hudson is located in central Angelina County adjacent to the western border of Lufkin, the county seat. Texas State Highway 94 passes through the community, leading southwest 30 miles (48 km) to Groveton.

According to the United States Census Bureau, Hudson has a total area of 5.1 square miles (13.2 km^{2}), of which 5.1 square miles (13.1 km^{2}) is land and 0.04 square miles (0.1 km^{2}), or 0.76%, is water.

== Demographics ==
Historical population
Census	Pop.	Note	%±
1970	670		—
1980	1,659		147.6%
1990	2,374		43.1%
2000	3,792		59.7%
2010	4,731		24.8%
2020	4,849		2.5%
U.S. Decennial Census

Hudson racial composition as of 2020 (NH = Non-Hispanic) (Note: Note: the US Census treats Hispanic/Latino as an ethnic category. This table excludes Latinos from the racial categories and assigns them to a separate category. Hispanics/Latinos can be of any race.)
Race	Number	Percentage
White (NH)	2,829	58.34%
Black or African American (NH)	551	11.36%
Native American or Alaska Native (NH)	30	0.62%
Asian (NH)	43	0.89%
Some Other Race (NH)	21	0.43%
Mixed/Multi-Racial (NH)	167	3.44%
Hispanic or Latino	1,208	24.91%
Total	4,849	

=== 2020 census ===
As of the 2020 census, there were 4,849 people, 1,788 households, and 1,381 families residing in the city. The median age was 34.2 years, 30.5% of residents were under the age of 18, and 13.3% of residents were 65 years of age or older. For every 100 females there were 84.1 males, and for every 100 females age 18 and over there were 79.7 males age 18 and over.

There were 1,788 households in Hudson, of which 42.0% had children under the age of 18 living in them. Of all households, 44.1% were married-couple households, 14.7% were households with a male householder and no spouse or partner present, and 35.0% were households with a female householder and no spouse or partner present. About 26.0% of all households were made up of individuals and 11.7% had someone living alone who was 65 years of age or older.

There were 1,952 housing units, of which 8.4% were vacant. The homeowner vacancy rate was 1.1% and the rental vacancy rate was 11.5%.

60.8% of residents lived in urban areas, while 39.2% lived in rural areas.

Racial composition as of the 2020 census
Race	Number	Percent
White	3,136	64.7%
Black or African American	563	11.6%
American Indian and Alaska Native	58	1.2%
Asian	45	0.9%
Native Hawaiian and Other Pacific Islander	0	0.0%
Some other race	484	10.0%
Two or more races	563	11.6%
Hispanic or Latino (of any race)	1,208	24.9%

=== 2000 census ===
As of the census of 2000, there were 3,792 people, 1,288 households, and 1,013 families residing in the city. The population density was 827.9 inhabitants per square mile (319.7/km^{2}). There were 1,390 housing units at an average density of 303.5 units per square mile (117.2 units/km^{2}). The racial makeup of the city was 83.91% White, 3.96% African American, 0.21% Native American, 0.29% Asian, 9.81% from other races, and 1.82% from two or more races. Hispanic or Latino of any race were 17.06% of the population.

There were 1,288 households, out of which 44.2% had children under the age of 18 living with them, 59.6% were married couples living together, 12.9% had a female householder with no husband present, and 21.3% were non-families. 17.8% of all households were made up of individuals, and 6.2% had someone living alone who was 65 years of age or older. The average household size was 2.94 and the average family size was 3.30.

In the city, the population was spread out, with 31.3% under the age of 18, 10.5% from 18 to 24, 30.7% from 25 to 44, 20.0% from 45 to 64, and 7.5% who were 65 years of age or older. The median age was 30 years. For every 100 females, there were 99.8 males. For every 100 females age 18 and over, there were 95.5 males.

The median income for a household in the city was $33,511, and the median income for a family was $37,292. Males had a median income of $26,935 versus $19,722 for females. The per capita income for the city was $13,798. About 12.1% of families and 13.3% of the population were below the poverty line, including 16.7% of those under age 18 and 15.5% of those age 65 or over.

Hudson has no post office. All mail sent to residents who live in Hudson can use Hudson, Texas or Lufkin, Texas address, since they share a zip code.

== Police services ==
The City of Hudson police department was closed in 2025. Police services currently are provided through a contract with the Angelina County Sheriff's Department.

== Education ==
Hudson is served by the Hudson Independent School District.
