= Jesse Jarue Mark =

Botanist

- Born: 24 September 1906; Apple Springs, Texas
- Died: 20 February 1971 (aged 65)
- Education: Prairie View A&M University; Iowa State University
- Known for: One of the first African-American scientists to earn a PhD in botany
- Scientific career
- Fields: Botany; Plant physiology
- Workplaces: Kentucky State University; Iowa Agricultural Experiment Station, Iowa State University

Jesse Jarue Mark (24 September 1906 – 20 February 1971) was an American botanist who was one of the first African-Americans to gain a PhD in botany, and likely the first at Iowa State University, where he joined the faculty. He was also a Rockefeller Agriculture Fellow.

== Early life ==
Jesse Jarue Mark was born in 1906 in Apple Springs, Texas, a town that had a school with 28 children in 1896 and a total population of 75 by World War I. A misspelling of his name as Jessie in the historical record appears to have led to the assumption that he was a woman.

== Education and career ==
Mark attended the historically Black college, Prairie View State College (now Prairie View A&M University). He was awarded a baccalaureate degree in 1929. Mark earned his master's degree at Iowa State University (ISU) in 1931, gained a position as professor at Kentucky State Industrial College (now Kentucky State University), and continued research associated with the Iowa Agricultural Experiment Station at ISU, a research program that was founded in 1888.

Mark was awarded his PhD by ISU in 1935. His doctoral work, "The relation of reserves to cold resistance in alfalfa", was published in 1936 and is in university version and journal version online. Mark studied cold resistance by growing six varieties of Grimm alfalfa known to have different levels of hardiness to cold. He analyzed samples from 50 representative plants of each variety.

Mark was a Rockefeller Agriculture Fellow in 1935–1936. Mark died on February 20, 1971, aged 65. He is buried in the Nigton Memorial Park Cemetery in Texas.
