= Lynn Dumenil =

American historian (born 1950)

- Born: October 9, 1950 (age 76)
- Education: University of Southern California (BA); University of California, Berkeley (MA, PhD)
- Occupation: Historian

Lynn Dumenil (born October 9, 1950) is an American historian.

She received her BA degree from USC. She received her MA and Ph.D from UC Berkeley. She is currently the Robert Glass Cleland Professor of American History at Occidental College and a member of the Organization of American Historians.

== Bibliography ==
- Freemasonry and American Culture, 1880-1930, Princeton University Press, 324p, 1984, ISBN 0691612269
- The Modern Temper: American Culture and Society in the 1920s, Lynn Dumenil, Eric Foner, Hill & Wang Inc., U.S., 360p, 1995, ISBN 0809015668
- America: A Concise History, James A. Henretta, Lynn Dumenil, David Brody, Study Guide, Bedford/st Martins, 1998, ISBN 1572596341
- Through Women's Eyes: An American History With Documents, Lynn Dumenil, Ellen DuBois, Bedford Books, 808p, 2005, ISBN 0312676034
- The Second Line of Defense: American Women and World War I, University of North Carolina Press, 360p, 2017, ISBN 1469652064
