= Anna Mackenroth =

Swiss lawyer (1861-1936)

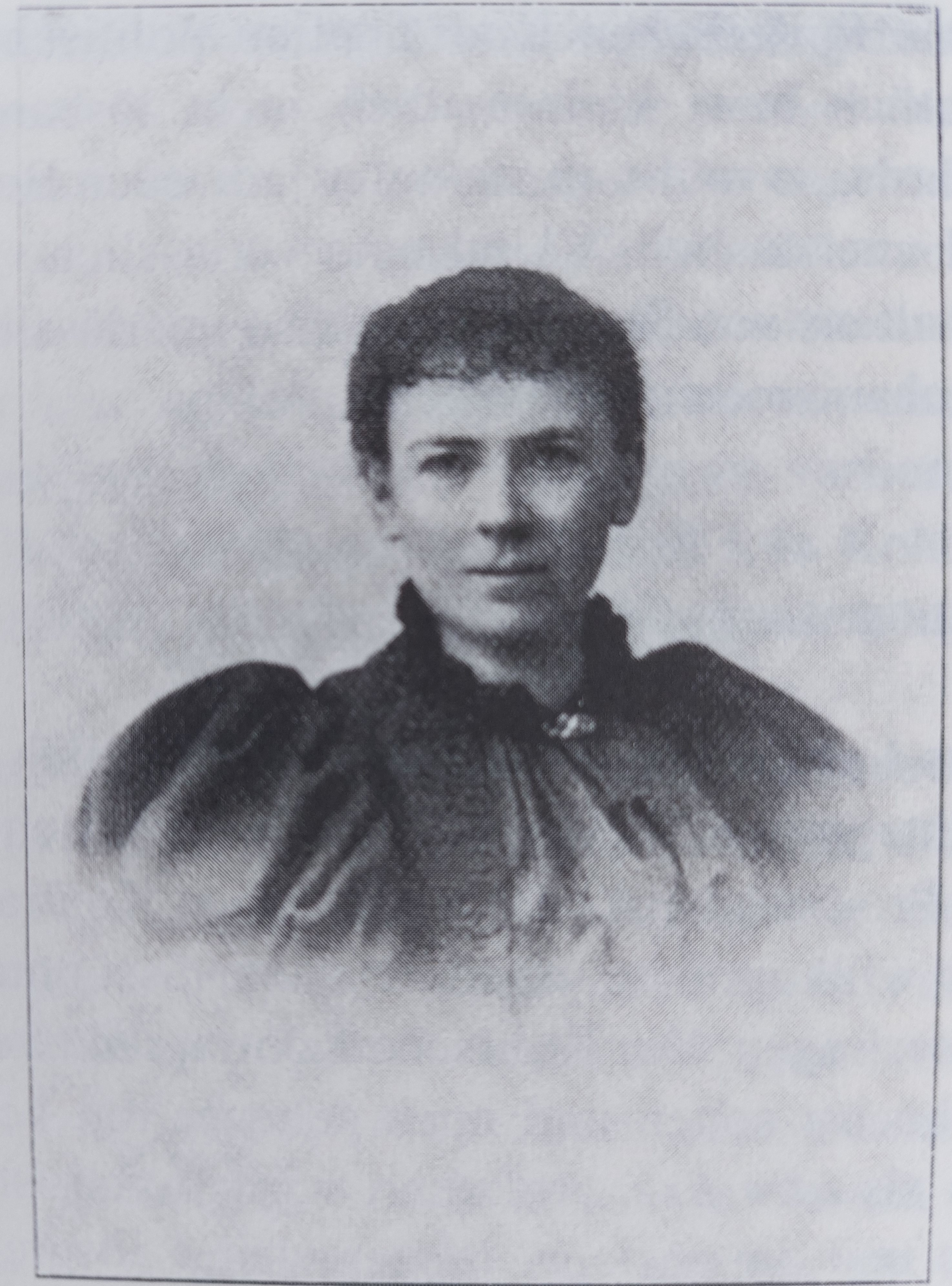
Anna Mackenroth (about 1900)

Anna Mackenroth (1861-1936) was Zurich's first practicing female lawyer.

== Early life and career ==
She was born and grew up in Danzig, (then in the Kingdom of Prussia), where as a young woman she worked as a teacher. In the early 1880s, she moved to Berlin where she gave private lessons in classical languages, philosophy and mathematics, while progressing her own studies in her spare time.

In 1888 she relocated to Zurich, Switzerland, where in 1894, she obtained her law doctorate from the university. She was taught by Emilie Kempin-Spyri.

Her doctoral dissertation was entitled "The History of Women in Commerce and Business" ("Zur Geschichte der Handels- und Gewerbefrau"). She became a Swiss citizen so that she could practice in that country. In November 1899, she appeared in a case which involved sixty million francs.

A referendum opened the way for women to practise as lawyers in Zurich in 1898, and Mackenroth received her practicing certificate on 27 January 1900. In 1903, she gave up her teaching career in order to be able to focus on her work as a lawyer. She worked mainly as a public defender representing destitute women.

She campaigned for a universal guaranteed minimum income (for citizens) to ensure a basic existence for every citizen. She campaigned for rights for single mothers, and for reform to legislation on family names and women's property rights.

She also headed the legal consultation office of the Association for the protection of women's rights, and was part of the steering committee of the Association for the reform of the education of women. She wrote several feminist dramas as well as other writings.

== Personal life ==
In 1911, she married Heinrich Kramer, a Zürich businessman, after which she was no longer publicly active in the women's movement. She wrote several dramas between 1903 and 1917, but these were not staged. She died in poverty in a psychiatric hospital.
