= Ellen DuBois =

American historian (born 1947)

- Born: 1947 (age 79)
- Education: Wellesley College (BA); Northwestern University (PhD)
- Occupations: Researcher, professor, writer
- Writing career
- Notable awards: Joan Kelly Memorial Prize
- Website: ellencaroldubois.com

Ellen Carol DuBois (born 1947) is a professor of history and gender studies. She has taught at the University at Buffalo and ended her career at the University of California, Los Angeles (UCLA). DuBois retired from UCLA in 2017. She is known for her pioneering work in women's history and for her history books.

== Biography ==
DuBois became interested in history while in her senior year of high school. She earned a B.A. from Wellesley College in 1968 and a Ph.D. from Northwestern University in 1975. DuBois became interested in the women's liberation movement while she was a graduate student and started working with the Chicago Women's Liberation Union. Her interest in the movement led to her becoming "one of the early pioneers of women's history," according to People's World. Her work focused on the importance of formal politics and women's history.

After teaching at the University at Buffalo for 16 years, she moved to Los Angeles to continue teaching at University of California, Los Angeles (UCLA). She retired from UCLA in 2017.

== Awards ==
In 1998, she won the Joan Kelly Memorial Prize of the American Historical Association for her book about Harriot Stanton Blatch, Harriot Stanton Blatch and the Winning of Woman Suffrage (Yale University Press, 1997).

== Selected publications ==
- Feminism and Suffrage: The Emergence of an Independent Women's Movement in America 1848–1869 (1978)
- "Working Women, Class Relations and Suffrage Militance: Harriot Stanton Blatch and the New York Woman Suffrage Movement, 1894–1910", The Journal of American History, June 1987
- Through Women's Eyes: An American History with Documents (with Lynn Dumenil) (2005)
- Suffrage: Women's Long Battle for the Vote (2020)
- Elizabeth Cady Stanton: A Revolutionary Life. Basic Books. 2026. ISBN 9781541647527.
