= Apple Springs Independent School District =

School district in Texas

Location
- 9120 FM 2501; Apple Springs, Texas ESC Region 6 USA
- Coordinates: 31°13′30″N 94°58′16″W

District information
- Type: Independent school district
- Motto: Where Character Counts
- Grades: Pre-K through 12
- Superintendent: Cody Moree
- Schools: 2
- NCES District ID: 4808490

Students and staff
- Students: 207 (2023–2024)
- Teachers: 16.97 (on an FTE basis) (2023–2024)
- Staff: 19.71 (on an FTE basis) (2023–2024)
- Student–teacher ratio: 12.20 (2023–2024)
- Athletic conference: UIL Class 1A 6-man Football Division I
- District mascot: Eagles
- Colors: Blue, White

Other information
- TEA District Accountability Rating for 2011–12: Academically Acceptable
- Website: www.asisd.com

Apple Springs Independent School District is a public school district based in Apple Springs, Texas (USA).

== Finances ==
As of the 2010–11 school year, the appraised valuation of property in the district was $29,249,000. The maintenance tax rate was $0.104 and the bond tax rate was $0.000 per $100 of appraised valuation.

== History ==
The district changed to a four day school week in fall 2021.

According to Cody Moree, the superintendent of Apple Springs ISD, the district had done several surveys on this, with the results in favor being at least 85% in favor of using a four day week. In 2022 the board of trustees maintained the four day week.

== Academic achievement ==
It has produced a National Merit Scholar finalist; had alumni earn degrees from Yale University, The University of Texas, Texas A&M University and many others. The district produced multiple UIL state champions between 1996 and 2008. The school was named one of the Top Ten High Schools in the state by Texas Monthly magazine. It has been cited by U.S. News & World Report as one of America's Top High Schools. The superintendent of ASISD, Cody Moree, is also the district's head football coach. The principal for ASISD is Kevin Plotts.

The high school has less than 60 students yet offers programs in nursing, commercial mechanics and fabrication and mass-media production.

Former teacher George Schaade (retired) was given the UIL Sponsor Excellence Award for his unprecedented accomplishment of having his current events team advance to the state academic meet ten times.

- 2004: Recognized

== Schools ==
In the 2011–12 school year, the district had students in two schools.

- Apple Springs High School (Grades 7–12)
- Apple Springs Elementary School (Grades PK–6)

== Football ==
The school has a unique relationship with the nearby Hudson Independent School District.

Apple Springs was the first public school in Deep East Texas to play the wide-open sport of Six-Man football. The district is too small to field a marching band. A neighboring school, Hudson ISD is the largest district in the state without a football team, but has an award-winning band program. So, the Hudson band participates at Apple Springs games. The unusual relationship was filmed by the crew of the popular Texas Country Reporter. The television show aired on November 16, 2008.

== See also ==
- List of school districts in Texas
- List of high schools in Texas
