= North Haven Board of Education v. Bell =

US Supreme Court case

- Supreme Court of the United States

Argued December 9, 1981 Decided May 17, 1982
- Full case name: North Haven Board of Education v. Bell
- Docket no.: 80-986
- Argument: Oral argument

Court membership
- Chief Justice Warren E. Burger Associate Justices William J. Brennan Jr. · Byron White; Thurgood Marshall · Harry Blackmun; Lewis F. Powell Jr. · William Rehnquist; John P. Stevens · Sandra Day O'Connor

Case opinions
- Majority: Harry A. Blackmun, joined by Brennan, White, Marshall, Stevens, O'Connor
- Dissent: Lewis F. Powell Jr., joined by Burger, Rehnquist

Broader School District that houses North Haven

North Haven Board of Education v. Bell, 456 U.S. 512 (1982), was a U.S. Supreme Court decision where the Court ruled that Title IX protections against sex-based discrimination applied to school employees as well as students within a federal funded education setting. Critically, this decision was made in contrast to many previous court rulings on the application of Title IX to individuals other than students. The decision of North Haven Board of Education v. Bell ushered in an understanding of Title IX that protects anyone interacting with the school system including “parents and guardians, students, applicants and employees." The employee protection of Title IX extends to both full and part-time faculty, dictating that equal pay must be given to men and women for the same work.

Prior to the 1982 decision, the judicial system of the United States was operating with the understanding that Title IX was exclusively designed for students, or “participants or beneficiaries” of educational programs. Teachers, therefore, were not viewed as a part of either of these categories.

== Background ==
After the implementation of Title IX, multiple cases of sex-based discrimination against employees of federally funded educational institutions were heard by various circuit courts. In cases such as Isleboro School Committee v. Califano (593 F.2d 424), Junior College District of St. Louis v. Califano (597 F.2d 119), and Romeo Community Schools v. HEW (600 F2d 581), the interpretation that employees were not protected against sex-based discrimination by Title IX was upheld.

=== First case ===
In 1978, a complaint with the U.S. department of Health, Education and Welfare (HEW) was filed against the North Haven Board of Education, a school district in Connecticut, by a former teacher of the district named Elaine Dove. Dove was a tenured teacher in the North Haven public school system who was not rehired after a one-year maternity leave. HEW began to investigate the North Haven school system asking for the school board's policies on hiring, tenure, and leaves of absence. The North Haven School Board refused to comply, prompting HEW to threaten financial sanctions on the school district. The board of education responded by filing suit in the United States District Court for the District of Connecticut, stating that HEW was overstepping its authority to investigate employment practices using Title IX because Title IX only applied to students.

=== Second case ===
The previous year, HEW began to investigate the complaint of another faculty member, Linda Potz, against Trumbull, another school district within Connecticut. When HEW declared that Trumbull must take corrective action, Trumbull filed suit in the United States District Court for the District of Connecticut.

For both cases, the district court sided in favor of the school districts, finding that Title IX was meant to only apply to students. The two filings were then combined on appeal. After appeal, the U.S. Court of Appeals for the Second District overturned the district courts' decisions.

== Supreme Court Decision ==
When the question “Do the protections against gender discrimination of Title IX apply to employees of schools?” was brought before the U.S. Supreme Court, it was a 6–3 decision ruling against the school boards, declaring that Title IX does protect employees of schools from gender discrimination.

This ruling declared that the U.S. Congress had intended Title IX to cover all individuals within the education system, meaning the regulations of HEW were constitutional.
