= Emilie Kempin-Spyri =

Swiss jurist (1853–1901)

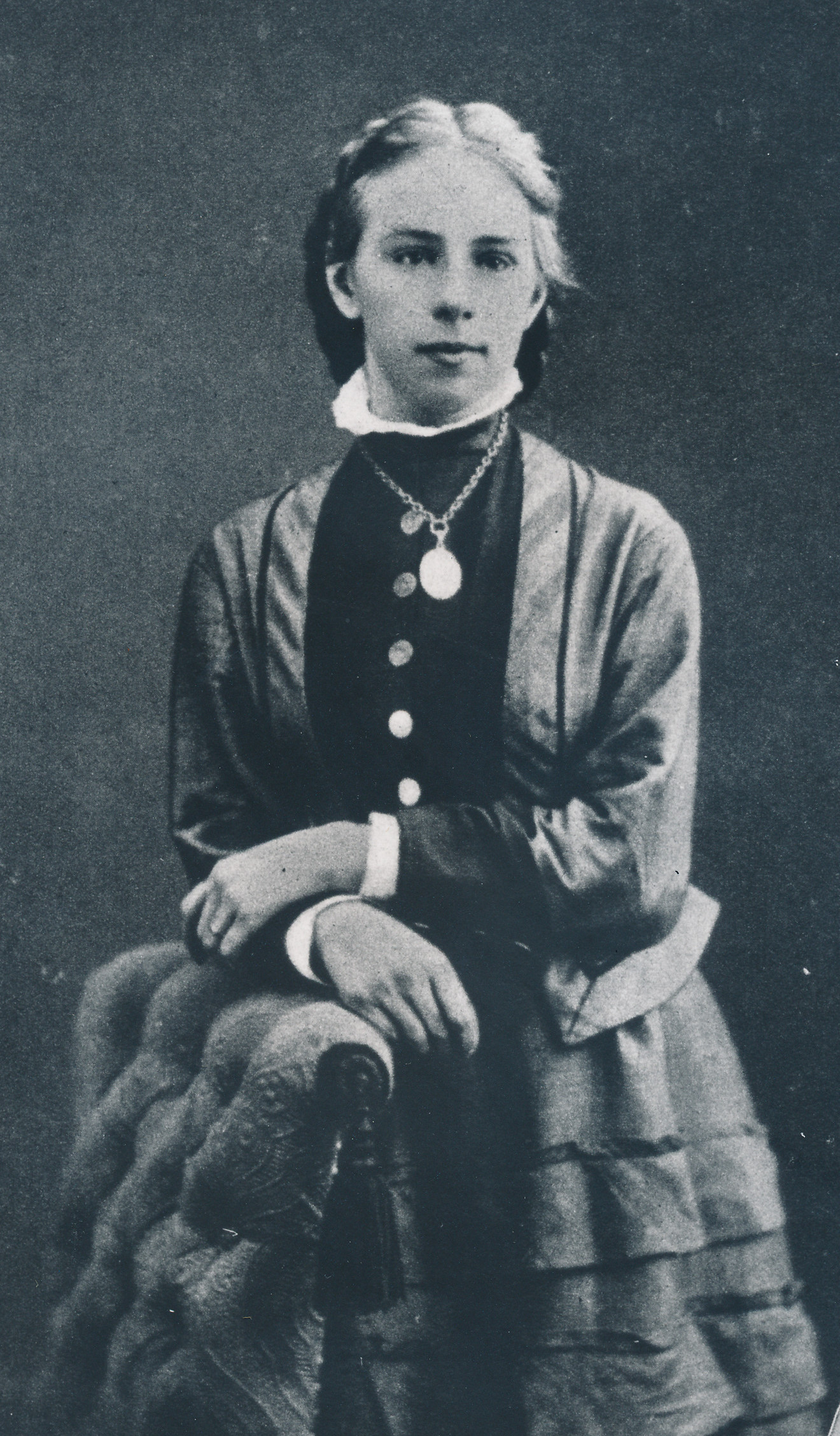
Emilie Kempin-Spyri, circa 1885

Emilie Kempin-Spyri (born March 18, 1853, in Altstetten; died April 12, 1901, in Basel; née Spyri, married name Kempin) was the first woman in Switzerland to graduate with a law degree and to be accepted as an academic lecturer. However, as a woman she was not permitted to practice as an attorney. She emigrated to New York where she taught at a law school she established for women, Woman's Law Class of New York University. She was the niece of the author Johanna Spyri.

== Education and career ==
She studied at the University of Zürich in 1883 as the first Swiss woman in the legal faculty. In 1887, she was graduated as the first female Doctor of Law in Europe. However, she was denied an attorney's charter due to lack of active citizenship. Her proposal before the Bundesgericht (Federal Supreme Court of Switzerland) for a re-interpretation of Article 4 of the Federal Constitution that the concept "Swiss citizen" could also include women, was rejected as "ebenso neu als kühn" (just as novel as audacious).

After she was also rejected as a lecturer at the University of Zürich, she emigrated to New York for a brief period, where she established the first women's law college. Due to the homesickness of her husband, Walter Kempin, who was not able to acclimatize to New York, the family returned to Switzerland.

In 1891 she made a renewed application for acceptance as a lecturer at the University of Zürich. Although the university senate declined the application again, she received the Venia Legendi (the right to lecture) from the education department as an exception. She was not able to keep her head above water financially with this occupation. Throughout her life, Kempin-Spyri fought for her admission as an attorney, and was finally broken down by this unsuccessful struggle. Impoverished, she died in Basel in 1901 of uterine cancer.

Thanks to Emilie Kempin-Spyri, a new attorney's statute was introduced in Zürich canton in 1898 that allowed women to practice law, in spite of lacking active citizenship.

This ruling was first adopted nationwide in 1923. Anna Mackenroth was the first Swiss woman to become an attorney.

== Memorials ==
On April 19, 2004, The Zürich Women's Guild Gesellschaft zu Fraumünster honored Emilie Kempin-Spyri as a Zürich citizen who, in spite of outstanding merit, has fallen into oblivion. The occasion took place under the patronage of the University of Zürich. The plaque that was unveiled at that time was replaced on May 28, 2009, by a definitive plaque in the foyer of the Bibliothek des Rechtswissenschaftlichen Instituts.

In a ceremony on January 22, 2008, a monument in the form of an oversized chaise longue created by Pipilotti Rist was unveiled in the atrium of the University of Zürich; with this, Kempin-Spyris's role was acknowledged as the first female university lecturer at the University of Zürich, and as a pioneer in equal rights for women.

Emily Kempin-Spyris's life was literarily portrayed in Eveline Hasler's book Die Wachsflügelfrau. In Altstetten, the Emilie-Kempin-Spyri-Weg was named after her.

== Literature ==
- Marianne Delfosse: Emilie Kempin-Spyri (1853-1901). Das Wirken der ersten Schweizer Juristin unter besonderer Berücksichtigung ihres Einsatzes für die Rechte der Frau im schweizerischen und deutschen Privatrecht. Jur. Diss. Zürich 1994.
- Christiane Berneike: Die Frauenfrage ist Rechtsfrage. Die Juristinnen der deutschen Frauenbewegung und das bürgerliche Gesetzbuch. Baden-Baden 1995. ISBN 3-7890-3808-3. Zu Kempin: u.a. S. 81–102.
- Jiro Rei Yashiki: Emilie Kempin-Spyri 1853–1901). Eine Skizze des Lebens und Werkes der Ersten promovierten Juristin Europas, Hitotsubashi Journal of Law and Politics 33 (2005), S. 7–17 und 34 (2006), S. 45–56 .
- Eveline Hasler: Die Wachsflügelfrau, Geschichte der Emily Kempin-Spyri, München 1995 (dtv), ISBN 3-423-12087-8
- Verein Feministische Wissenschaft Schweiz (Hg.): Ebenso neu als kühn: 120 Jahre Frauenstudium an der Universität Zürich. Verantwortlich für die Redaktion dieses Bandes: Katharina Belser, Gabi Einsele, Rachel Gratzfeld, Regula Schnurrenberger. Zürich 1988. (Schriftenreihe / Verein Feministische Wissenschaft), ISBN 3-905493-01-2

== See also ==
- First women lawyers around the world
