= Fitzgerald v. Barnstable School Committee =

- Supreme Court of the United States

Argued December 2, 2008 Decided January 21, 2009
- Full case name: Fitzgerald et vir v. Barnstable School Committee et al.
- Docket no.: 07-1125
- Citations: 555 U.S. 246 (more) 129 S. Ct. 788; 172 L. Ed. 2d 582; 2009 U.S. LEXIS 592

Case history
- Prior: Hunter v. Barnstable Sch. Comm., 456 F. Supp. 2d 255 (D. Mass. 2006); affirmed sub. nom., Fitzgerald v. Barnstable Sch. Comm., 504 F.3d 165 (1st Cir. 2007); cert. granted, 553 U.S. 1093 (2008).

Holding
- Title IX does not preclude a §1983 action alleging unconstitutional gender discrimination in schools.

Court membership
- Chief Justice John Roberts Associate Justices John P. Stevens · Antonin Scalia; Anthony Kennedy · David Souter; Clarence Thomas · Ruth Bader Ginsburg; Stephen Breyer · Samuel Alito

Case opinion
- Majority: Alito, joined by unanimous

Fitzgerald v. Barnstable School Committee, 555 U.S. 246 (2009), is a case in which the United States Supreme Court held that parents could sue a school committee under grounds of the Equal Protection Clause of the 14th Amendment.

== Background ==
During the 2000-01 school year, Jacqueline Fitzgerald, a kindergartener at Hyannis West Elementary School in the Barnstable School District was coerced by a third-grader, to lift her dress up when she rode the public school bus to school. In February 2001, Fitzgerald told her parents about the incidents on the bus, and her parents contacted the school. The school identified two kindergarten students who corroborated Fitzgerald's account of the harassment, but the school's principal, Fredrick Scully, informed the Fitzgeralds the school would not take action.

The Fitzgeralds contacted the Barnstable Police Department to investigate the matter, but the investigator determined there were insufficient evidence to bring criminal charges.

In March 2001, the Fitzgeralds made a written request for a bus monitor, the separation of the children with disciplinary problems and the kindergarten students, and the removal of the third-grader from the bus. The superintendent of the Barnstable School District denied the request. The Fitzgeralds alleged that the teachers at Hyannis West Elementary School were not properly informed of the harassment and did not separate their daughter from the harasser.

The Fitzgeralds filed suit alleging the school's response to the allegations of sexual harassment was inadequate. The complaint alleged violations of Title IX and 42 U.S.C. § 1983, and various state claims. The District Court of the District of Massachusetts dismissed the state claims and the § 1983 claim under Federal Rules of Civil Procedure 12(b)(6) for a failure to state a claim. Subsequently, the district court granted summary judgment on the Title IX claim. The First Circuit Court of Appeals affirmed the judgment of the district court and held that Title IX precluded § 1983 claims based on equal protection. The First Circuit stated that five conditions must be met for a plaintiff to succeed for a Title IX violation: (1) the institution is a recipient of federal funding, (2) severe, pervasive, and objectively offensive harassment occurred, (3) the harassment denied the student of educational opportunities or benefits, (4) the institution had actual knowledge of the harassment, and (5) the institution's deliberate indifference caused the student to be subjected to the harassment.

== Opinion of the Court ==
In a unanimous decision the United States Supreme Court held Title IX does not preclude Section 1983 equal protection claims. Justice Samuel Alito wrote the opinion. The Court reversed the First Circuit's decision which found Title IX provided a comprehensive remedial scheme that precluded the use of Section 1983 claims. The decision resolved a split in the circuits, and abrogated the Second, Third, and Seventh Circuits opinions in Bruneau v. South Kortright Central School District, Waid v. Merrill Area Public Schools, and Pfeiffer v. Marion Center Area School District respectively. Fitzgerald affirmed the judgment of the Sixth, Eighth, and Tenth Circuits in Communities for Equity v. Michigan High School, Crawford v. Davis, and Seamons v. Snow respectively.

== See also ==
- List of United States Supreme Court cases, volume 555
- List of United States Supreme Court cases
