= Woman's Law Class of New York University =

American university extension course (est. 1890)

Woman's Law Class of New York University was an American organization affiliated with New York University (NYU). It was established in New York City in 1890 by the Woman's Legal Education Society. It was composed mainly of women who owned property. They studied law not to be able to practice it but to fit them in to handle their affairs more intelligently. The offered courses were designed to meet the wants of women who desired familiarity with the law, either for practical purposes in business and the administration of trust estates or for its value in general culture and educational development. It also furnished preparation for entering the professional study of law with a view to active practice at the bar. The students who successfully passed the examination held in this class were granted the Chancellor's Certificate. Endowments included a lectureship, scholarships, and prizes.

== Women's Legal Education Society ==
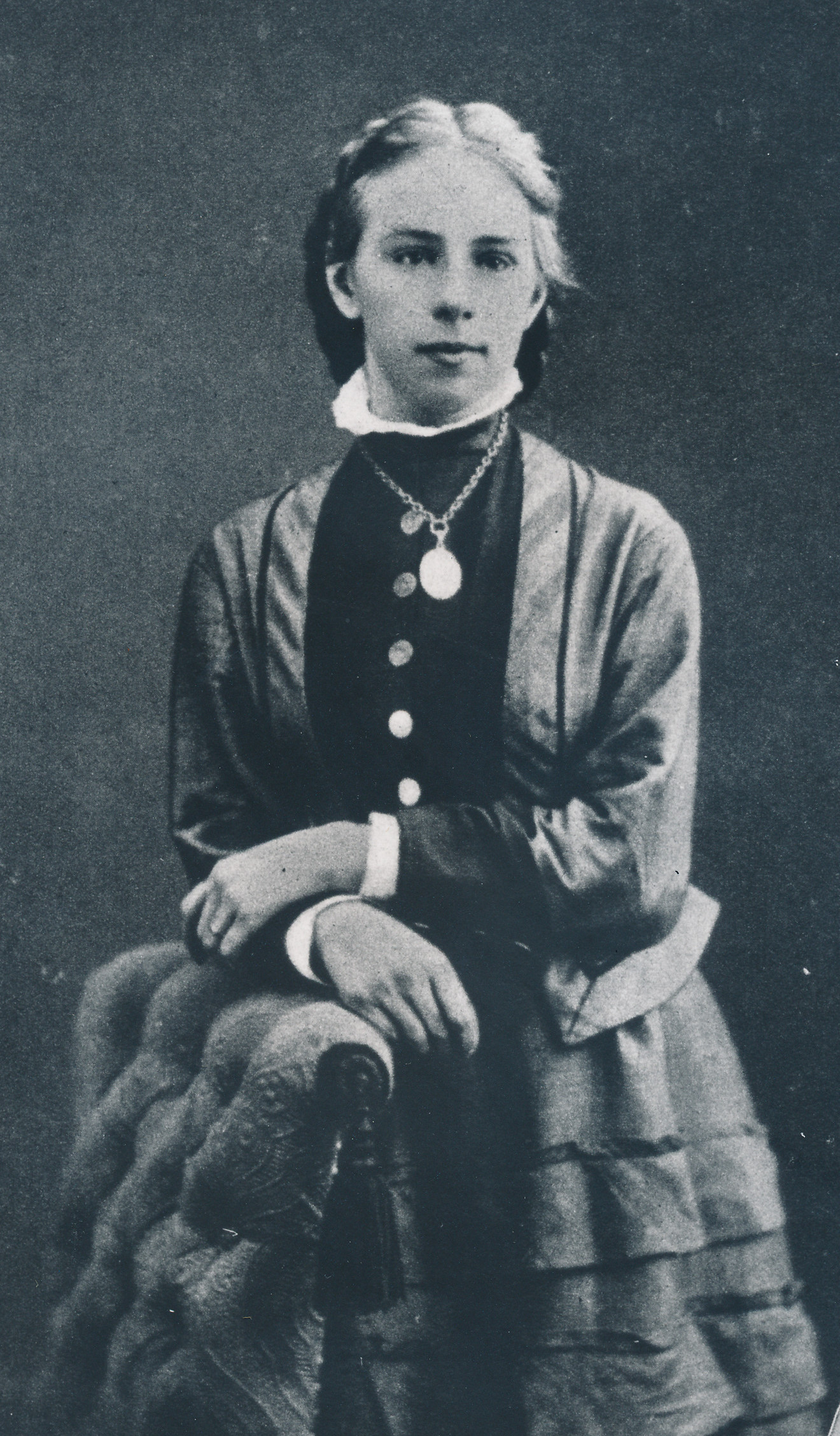
Emilie Kempin-Spyri, circa 1885

The Woman's Legal Education Society of New York was founded Fanny B. Trensch Weber (Mrs. Leonard Weber), who was born in Hungary and died in Heidelberg, Germany, on May 3, 1895. A board of 12 directors administered the affairs of the society, and pledged annual support for a lectureship for several years. The society organized the Woman's Law Class in 1890 and incorporated it within a few months on June 14. The diea originated in the interest aroused in a group of women by the career of Emilie Kempin-Spyri, Doctor of Laws, from the University of Zürich, who came to New York City to seek opportunities for practicing law and for teaching. Her energy provided unexpected interest in women's study of law.

== Woman's Law Class history ==
The Woman's Law Class was the first of its kind in the U.S. The first three enrolled students were Mrs. Theodore Sutro, Mrs. Harriet S Barnes and Mrs. Geo. B. McClellan. Beginning in 1894, NYU conferred the chancellor's certificate on women who had taken the course in business law for non-matriculants.

The program did not receive a permanent status until 1900 when the NYU Corporation received an endowment of US$25,000 as the gift of members of the Legal Education Society and friends they had interested in the cause. Upon receipt of this gift, NYU undertook the permanent support of the Woman's Law Class as an important form of university extension work. It further resolved to give this class a place in each general catalog of NYU. The university continued to invite the cooperation of the Woman's Legal Education Society and committed to, in considerable measure, increasing the public's interest in this form of instruction.

The course provided familiarity with legal terms, general law principles, and court operations. In 1895, four courses of lectures were given on law during the winter season. Three weekly lectures were given during the season on Mondays, Wednesdays and Fridays. There were two classes-a morning and evening class. The tenth floor of the new building was occupied by the lecture rooms, library and offices of the Women's Law Class. In 1937, the course duration was 15 weeks per term.

A class textbook, the Outlines of Law, was prepared and found to be so valuable that it was adopted in New York University Law School and elsewhere. Though the program was entirely "extension work," leading to no degree, after ten years of existence, the organization had an endowment and was accepted as a permanent part of university extension work. By 1921, more than 1,000 students had graduated from the Class. Many of the graduates afterwards entered the University Law School.

== Offshoot ==
In 1900, in Philadelphia, a similar program was started, largely under the auspices of professors of the University of Pennsylvania.

== Selected works ==
- Bryant, Edwin Eustace, The Outlines of Law (Democrat Printing Company, 1895) (text)
