= Hudson Independent School District =

School district in Texas, United States

Location
- Hudson, TX ESC Region 7 USA
- Coordinates: 31.3161°N 94.8300°W

District information
- Type: Public Independent school district
- Grades: EE through 12
- Superintendent: Donny Webb
- Schools: 5 (2021-22)
- NCES District ID: 4823790

Students and staff
- Students: 2799 (2021-22)
- Teachers: 212.5 (2021-22) (on full-time equivalent (FTE) basis)
- Student–teacher ratio: 13.2 (2021-22)
- Athletic conference: UIL Class AAAA (non-football participant)
- Colors: Maroon, White, and Black

Other information
- Mascot: Hornet
- Website: www.hudsonisd.net

Hudson Independent School District is a public school district based in Hudson, Texas (USA).

In 2009, the school district was rated "recognized" by the Texas Education Agency.

== History ==
The current Hudson school began as the traditional "one-room schoolhouse" in 1880. After several moves, it relocated to its current location in 1928.

That same year, the Hudson, Narroway, and Bethlehem districts voted to consolidate into the Hudson Consolidated Common School District, and the Chancy Switch district was later annexed into the district that same year.

In 1930 the Providence, Peavy Switch, and Happy Hour districts voted to consolidate into the Hudson district.

In 1940, Hudson became an independent school district, adopting its present name.

The school has a unique relationship with the nearby Apple Springs Independent School District. Apple Springs participates in six-man football but does not offer a band program, while Hudson has a band but does not participate in football. Therefore, the Hudson band participates at Apple Springs games. The unusual relationship was filmed by the crew of the popular Texas Country Reporter. The television show aired on November 16, 2008. Additional sports offered include soccer, cross country, basketball, track, golf, softball, baseball, and volleyball.

== Schools ==
In the 2021-2022 school year, the district had students in five schools.

High schools

- Hudson High School (Grades 9-12)

Middle schools

- Hudson Middle School (Grades 6-8)

Elementary schools

- W.H. Bonner Elementary School (Grades 3-5)
- W.F. Peavy Primary School (Grades EE-2)

Alternative schools

- Stubblefield Learning Center (Grades 9-12)

== Controversies ==
HISD has had controversies regarding a few of its former faculty members.

- Heather Robertson
- James English
- Lesa Langley
