= Texas Recreational Road 255 =

State road in Tyler, Jasper, and Newton counties in Texas, United States

Recreational Road 255
- RE 255 highlighted in red

Route information
- Maintained by TxDOT
- Length: 56.596 mi (91.082 km)
- Existed: April 15, 1970–present

Major junctions
- West end: US 69 north of Colmesneil
- SH 63 northeast of Beans; US 96 south of Browndell; SH 87 in Newton
- East end: FM 692 in South Toledo Bend

Location
- Country: United States
- State: Texas
- Counties: Tyler, Jasper, Newton

Highway system
- Highways in Texas; Interstate; US; State; Former; Toll; Loops; Spurs; FM/RM; Park; Rec
← RE 11	→ RE 2

Recreational Road 255 (RE 255) is a 56.596-mile-long (91.082 km) Recreational Road located in Tyler, Jasper, and Newton counties, in southeastern Texas, United States. The highway travels through mainly rural areas in the northern portion of the three counties. RE 255 begins at an intersection with U.S. Route 69 (US 69), in Tyler County, north of the city of Colmesneil. The route travels through rural farmland in northern Tyler County, and crosses the Neches River into Jasper County. The roadway intersects Texas State Highway 63 (SH 63) and U.S. Route 96, and helps form part of the Sam Rayburn Dam. The route continues into Newton County, intersecting Texas State Highway 87, before terminating at an intersection with Farm to Market Road 692 (FM 692), near the Louisiana state line. RE 255 helps provide access to Angelina National Forest, the Sam Rayburn Reservoir, and the Toledo Bend Reservoir, which give the highway its Recreational Road designation.

RE 255 began as Farm to Market Road 255 (FM 255), with the first section of the route being designated in 1945. Throughout the 1950s and the 1960s, FM 255 was extended several times, with the final extension being made in early 1970. The first segment of RE 255 was designated in 1970 as the first route in the Recreational Road system. The highway was extended three more times in the 1970s, completely replacing FM 255. FM 255 had a short spur that was designated in 1970, and was transferred over to RE 255 in 1974 when the main route was replaced. RE 255 Spur was cancelled in 1979.

== Route description ==
=== Tyler County ===
From its western terminus at US 69, RE 255 procees eastward as a two-lane road, intersecting County Route 3251 (CR 3251) before turning northeast. Resuming an eastward course, it proceeds through the small community of Oak Grove before again turning to the northeast. RE 255 passes the Gregory Cemetery and intersects several county roads, slowly bending east. It passes through forest land and intersects CR 3725 before crossing the Neches River into Jasper County.

=== Jasper County ===
After crossing the Neches River, RE 255 enters Jasper County and proceeds easterly. After a short distance, it crosses over a small relief creek for the Neches River and continues through heavily forested rural areas before turning slightly southeast. The route proceeds over a small creek before slowly bending northeastward. The roadway turns northerly and passes the small community of Beans. It also intersects several county roads, including the former RE 255 Spur, which is now CR 32. The highway then enters Angelina National Forest.

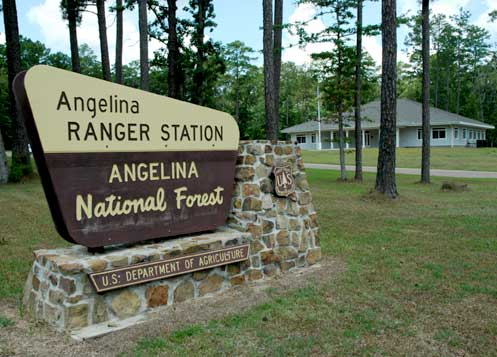
The entrance to Angelina National Forest. RE 255 passes through the southern portion of the forest

RE 255 continues slightly northeasterly, passing through mainly farmland before reaching its junction with SH 63. RE 255 continues northward, entering the community of Ebenezer. The roadway proceeds east and passes the McGee Cemetery. RE 255 proceeds to the Angelina River at the Sam Rayburn Dam. The road bends northeastward, passing through the small Overlook Park and continuing northeast along the dam. It turns southeast and continues along the dam. The dam ends after approximately 1.5 miles (2.4 km) and the highway exits Angelina National Forest and enters Twin Dikes Park. The roadway continues, taking a large bend southeast and intersecting several local roads that lead to the reservoir. The highway proceeds southeasterly, passing the community of Sam Rayburn. RE 255 proceeds northeast for a short distance before shifting eastward through Rayburn Country and intersecting FM 1007. Turning southeast, the route passes the southern edge of the Rayburn Country golf resort before exiting the community of Sam Rayburn and reentering rural areas. RE 255 shifts southeast and proceeds to an intersection with US 96. The route bends northeasterly, intersecting CR 232 before proceeding out of Jasper County.

=== Newton County ===
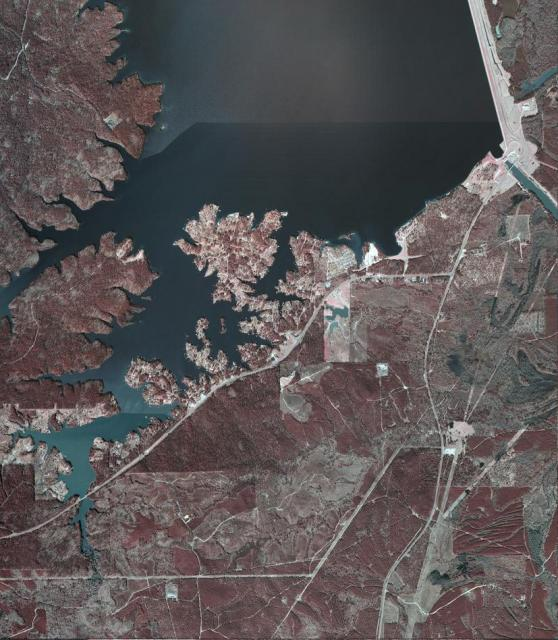
An aerial view of South Toledo Bend; RE 255 travels through the community

RE 255 enters Newton County traveling eastward. The highway proceeds eastward before bending northeasterly and entering dense forest. Continuing eastward, the road reaches an intersection with SH 87. The route continues east, passing the Mitchell Cemetery. The highway intersects a couple of county routes and turns east before crossing over a small cove on the Toledo Bend Reservoir. RE 255 the enters the community of South Toledo Bend. It travels parallel to the reservoir, passing several small neighborhoods before shifting eastward. RE 255 passes the Shady Oaks Marina and the Sam Forse Collins Recreational Area before reaching its eastern terminus at an at-grade intersection with FM 692.

== History ==
Farm to Market Road 255
- Location: Colmesneil - South Toledo Bend
- Length: 56.596 mi (91.082 km)
- Existed: June 12, 1945–September 15, 1978

The first portion of what would become RE 255 was designated on June 12, 1945 as the first stretch of Farm to Market Road 255 (FM 255). This route traveled from an intersection with S 63 to Ferguson at a length of approximately 2.8 miles (4.5 km). On September 27, 1960, FM 255 was extended 4.4 miles (7.1 km) northeastward to the McGee Bend Dam on Lake Sam Rayburn. FM 255 was extended on June 15, 1961 along a road that traveled along the McGee Bend Dam to an intersection with US 96. This extension added approximately 8.3 miles (13.4 km) to the route. In 1962, three small bridges were constructed in western Jasper County. These bridges still function along the modern route. (Note: These bridges were the Trout Creek Bridge, the West Jordan Creek Bridge, and the East Jordan Creek Bridge.) On October 1, 1963, FM 255 was extended approximately 0.8 miles (1.3 km) southeastward from S 63. In 1965, the current bridge over the Angelina River was constructed. Farm to Market Road 2628 from US 69 east 4.4 miles (7.1 km) and Farm to Market Road 3125 from SH 87 to FM 692 were combined with the route on February 15, 1970, adding 4.4 miles (7.1 km) and 11.3 miles (18.2 km) respectively to FM 255.

On April 1, 1970, TxDOT applied the RE 255 designation to the portions of FM 255 from approximately 4.8 miles (7.7 km) east of US 69 to Beans Place 2.7 miles (4.3 km) west of SH 63 and from US 96 to SH 87. It was the first route to be classified by TxDOT as a Recreational Road, though Ranch Road 1 (which the recreational roads continue their numbering from) has the same purpose. In 1971, the modern bridge crossing over the small Indian Creek, located in western Jasper County, was constructed. On March 15, 1974, RE 255 was extended eastward approximately 2.7 miles (4.3 km) from Beans Place to SH 63, giving the highway a total length of approximately 29.3 miles (47.2 km). In 1976, the current bridge crossing the small Rocky Creek in western Newton County was constructed. In 1977, three of the route's current bridges were constructed. Two of the bridges cross over the Neches River and the other is a small bridge located in Newton County. (Note: These bridges were the Neches River Bridge, the Neches River Relief Bridge, and the Primrose Slough Bridge.) The final portions of FM 255 was transferred to RE 255 on September 15, 1978, adding approximately 27.9 miles (44.9 km) to RE 255. In 1981, the last two current bridges along the route were constructed. Both are small bridges located in western Newton County. (Note: These bridges were the Big Cow Creek Bridge and the Little Cow Creek Bridge.)

In 1990, the FM 255 designation would be applied to a route in Webb County. This route is now part of Texas State Highway 255.

== Future ==
RE 255 is located within the study area of the proposed Interstate 14, the Gulf Coast Strategic Highway. The current proposed routing of the Interstate would run along Texas State Highway 63, to the south of RE 255, but no official routing has decided on. A possible alternative routing of the highway would replace RE 255 as part of the Interstate.

== Major junctions ==
County	Location	mi	km	Destinations	Notes
Tyler		0.000	0.000	US 69 – Zavalla, Woodville	Western terminus
Jasper	Beans	16.503	26.559	CR 45	Former RE 255 Spur
Jasper		18.468	29.721	SH 63 – Lufkin, Jasper	
Jasper	Rayburn Country	27.939	44.963	FM 1007 east / Rayburn Boulevard – Brookeland	Western end of FM 1007
Jasper		31.197	50.207	US 96 north – Brookeland, Jasper	
Newton	Mayflower	45.794	73.698	SH 87 – Hemphill, Newton	
Newton	South Toledo Bend	56.596	91.082	FM 692 north – Hornbeck, Burkeville	Eastern terminus
1.000 mi = 1.609 km; 1.000 km = 0.621 mi

== Spur route ==
Recreational Road 255 Spur
- Location: Beans
- Length: 0.700 mi (1,127 m)
- Existed: February 15, 1970–December 12, 1979

Recreational Road 255 Spur (RE 255 Spur) was a 0.7-mile-long (1.1 km) spur connection of FM 255 and later RE 255 that connected the small Beans community in Jasper County to RE 255.

RE 255 Spur began at an intersection with RE 255 near Beans Community, inside the southern edge of Angelina National Forest. The highway proceeded southeastward through rural areas, passing several small fields and houses. The roadway continued to its eastern terminus, a dead end point.

RE 255 Spur was originally designated on February 15, 1970, as FM 255 Spur, on its present location. The spur was redesignated as RE 255 on March 15, 1974. The spur was cancelled and turned back to local maintenance on December 18, 1979. The route has since been added to CR 45.

Major junctions

The entire highway was in Beans, Jasper County.

mi	km	Destinations	Notes
0.000	0.000	RE 255	Western terminus
0.700	1.127	Dead end	Eastern terminus
1.000 mi = 1.609 km; 1.000 km = 0.621 mi

== See also ==
- List of Recreational Roads in Texas
