= Texas State Highway 63 =

State highway in Texas

State Highway 63

Route information
- Maintained by TxDOT
- Length: 61.7 mi (99.3 km)
- Existed: 1923–present

Major junctions
- West end: US 69 in Zavalla
- US 96 / US 190 in Jasper
- East end: LA 8 at the Louisiana state line near Burr Ferry, LA

Location
- Country: United States
- State: Texas
- Counties: Angelina, Jasper, Newton

Highway system
- Highways in Texas; Interstate; US; State; Former; Toll; Loops; Spurs; FM/RM; Park; Rec
← SH 62	→ SH 64

State Highway 63 (SH 63) is a highway in east Texas that runs from Zavalla through Jasper, continuing east to the Louisiana state line. The route is proposed to become an extension of I-14 in the future.

== History ==
The highway was originally designated on August 21, 1923 along the easternmost branch of previously numbered SH 7 from Zavalla southeast to Bon Wier. On September 26, 1939, the section from Jasper to Bon Wier was transferred to U.S. Highway 190 (the original plan was for the remaining section from Lufkin to Jasper to be US 287 Alternate, but that designation was rejected), while SH 63 was rerouted northeast to the Louisiana state line via Burkeville, replacing part of SH 45 (this was proposed as SH 296). This is its current routing.

== Future ==
As part of the I-14 System in Texas project, SH 63 between Jasper and the Louisiana state line is proposed to be upgraded to interstate standards and become I-14.

== Major intersections ==
County	Location	mi	km	Destinations	Notes
Angelina	Zavalla	0.00	0.00	US 69 – Woodville, Lufkin	
Angelina	Zavalla	0.69	1.11	SH 147 north – San Augustine	
Angelina		4.99	8.03	FM 2743 east	
Jasper		18.11	29.15	RE 255 to US 69 – Sam Rayburn Dam	
Jasper		24.13	38.83	FM 1747 south – Bevilport	
Jasper		25.25	40.64	FM 254 (Peach Tree Road) – Peach Tree	
Jasper	Curtis	27.85	44.82	FM 2799 west – Bevilport	West end of FM 2799 overlap
Jasper	Curtis	28.16	45.32	FM 777 south – Science Hall, Beech Grove	
Jasper		29.12	46.86	FM 3414 north	
Jasper		29.17	46.94	FM 2799 east (W Houston Street)	East end of FM 2799 overlap
Jasper	Jasper	30.51	49.10	FM 777	
Jasper	Jasper	31.13	50.10	US 190 west – Woodville	West end of US 190 overlap
Jasper	Jasper	31.90	51.34	FM 252 south (Springhill Road) – Erin, Kirbyville	
Jasper	Jasper	32.71	52.64	US 96 (S Wheeler Street) – San Augustine, Kirbyville	
Jasper	Jasper	33.73	54.28	US 190 east – Newton, DeRidder	East end of US 190 overlap
Jasper		35.19	56.63	FM 776 west – Jasper	
Jasper		36.53	58.79	FM 1408 south – Holly Springs	
Jasper		38.49	61.94	FM 1738 north – Harrisburg	
Newton		41.75	67.19	FM 1012 south – Jamestown	
Newton		50.60	81.43	FM 1415 south to SH 87 – Shankleville	West end of FM 1415 overlap
Newton		51.18	82.37	FM 1415 north to SH 87 – Wiergate	East end of FM 1415 overlap
Newton	Burkeville	53.53	86.15	SH 87 – Hemphill, Newton	
Newton	Burkeville	53.67	86.37	FM 1414 south to SH 87	
Newton	Burkeville	53.94	86.81	FM 692 north – South Toledo Bend	
Newton		56.88	91.54	FM 2991 south to FM 1414	
Newton		64.05	103.08	LA 8 east – Leesville	Burr's Ferry Bridge over the Sabine River; continuation into Louisiana
1.000 mi = 1.609 km; 1.000 km = 0.621 mi: Concurrency terminus
