= Texas State Highway 62 =

State highway in Texas

State Highway 62

Route information
- Maintained by TxDOT
- Length: 29.249 mi (47.072 km)
- Existed: 1923–present

Major junctions
- South end: SH 73 / SH 87 near Bridge City
- I-10 / US 90 in Orange
- North end: US 96 / Bus. US 96 / FM 1004 at Buna

Location
- Country: United States
- State: Texas
- Counties: Orange, Newton, Jasper

Highway system
- Highways in Texas; Interstate; US; State; Former; Toll; Loops; Spurs; FM/RM; Park; Rec
← US 62	→ SH 63

State Highway 62 (SH 62) is a highway located in southeastern Texas. It runs 29.249 miles (47.072 km) from SH 73/SH 87 near Orange to an intersection with U.S. Highway 96 (US 96), Business U.S. Highway 96 (US 96 Bus), and Farm to Market Road 1004 (FM 1004) in Buna. SH 62 was established in 1923, and its southern end was extended from US 90 to SH 73/SH 87 in 1962.

== Route description ==
SH 62 begins at SH 73 and SH 87 between Orange and Bridge City. SH 73 is concurrent with SH 62 from the southern terminus to the intersection with Interstate 10 (I‑10) and US 90, where SH 73 ends. SH 62 continues its northward journey past this point, going through Mauriceville and Texla in Orange County, clipping the extreme southwest corner of Newton County, and, in Jasper County, traveling through the small community of Gist and ending at Buna.

== History ==
This route was designated on August 21, 1923, but with its south end at SH 3 (later US 90), replacing SH 8B. On April 7, 1955, the road was rerouted over a section of FM 406 from Peveto to US 90; a section of the old route was transferred to FM 1078 and the rest of the old rote was given to Orange County, and is now Womack Road. On May 1, 1962, the remainder of FM 406 was canceled and combined with SH 62.

== Major intersections ==
County	Location	mi	km	Destinations	Notes
Orange		29.154	46.919	SH 73 / SH 87 – Bridge City, Orange	South end of SH 73 overlap; SH 73 west continues concurrently with SH 87 south
Orange		27.047	43.528	FM 105 (Orangefield Road) – Orangefield, West Orange	
Orange	Orange	24.571– 24.513	39.543– 39.450	I-10 / US 90 / SH 73 ends – Beaumont, Lake Charles	I-10 exit 873; north end of SH 73 concurrency; east end of SH 73
Orange	Orange	23.221	37.371	FM 1078 east	
Orange	Mauriceville	17.568	28.273	FM 1130 to FM 1136 – Little Cypress	Interchange
Orange	Mauriceville	17.323– 17.207	27.879– 27.692	SH 12 – Beaumont, Deweyville	
Orange	Texla	16.261	26.170	FM 2802 west (Texla Road) to FM 105	
Newton	No major junctions				
Jasper		8.499	13.678	FM 2246 west – Evadale	
Jasper		4.123	6.635	FM 2938 north – Masterson State Forest	
Jasper		2.217	3.568	FM 2938 south	
Jasper	Buna	0.971	1.563	FM 253 east to SH 87	
Jasper	Buna	0.653	1.051	Bus. US 96	South end of unsigned US 96 Business overlap
Jasper	Buna	0.000	0.000	US 96 / Bus. US 96 / FM 1004 – Kirbyville, Evadale	North end of unsigned US 96 Business overlap
1.000 mi = 1.609 km; 1.000 km = 0.621 mi: Concurrency terminus
