= List of Recreational Roads in Texas =

Recreational Roads
- Texas Recreational Road markers

System information
- Length: 80.5 mi (129.6 km)
- Formed: April 1, 1970

Highway names
- Interstates: Interstate X (I-X); Interstate Highway X (IH-X)
- US Highways: U.S. Highway X (US X)
- State: State Highway X (SH X)
- Loops: Loop X
- Spurs: Spur X
- Recreational: Recreational Road X (RE X)
- Farm or Ranch to Market Roads: Farm to Market Road X (FM X); Ranch to Market Road X (RM X)
- Park Roads: Park Road X (PR X)

System links
- Highways in Texas; Interstate; US; State; Former; Toll; Loops; Spurs; FM/RM; Park; Rec

Recreational Roads (RE) are a secondary state highway system located in the U.S. state of Texas, maintained by the Texas Department of Transportation (TxDOT). In contrast to routes of the state's Park Road system, which provide access to state-maintained parks, routes on the Recreational Road system provide access to recreation areas such as those operated by the National Park Service. Recreational Roads currently make up approximately 80.5 miles (129.6 km) of Texas's highway system. The longest route in the system is the 56.6-mile-long (91.1 km) Recreational Road 255 (RE 255), while the shortest route in the system is RE 6 at 0.30 miles (0.48 km). Recreational Roads are signed with route markers that are similar to those for the Farm to Market Road system, with the background color changed to brown and the letter "R" in the upper right corner.

The system was created on April 1, 1970, when a portion of Farm to Market Road 255 (FM 255) was redesignated as RE 255. Except for RE 255, TxDOT numbers recreational roads sequentially: RE 2 is the system's second oldest route, and is numbered accordingly, while RE 11 is the system's most recent addition to the system. Only a few highways on the system were created from preexisting routes. One route on the system, RE 5, has been canceled. TxDOT has previously designated one type of auxiliary route within the system; however, no such route currently exists.

== Overview ==
=== History ===
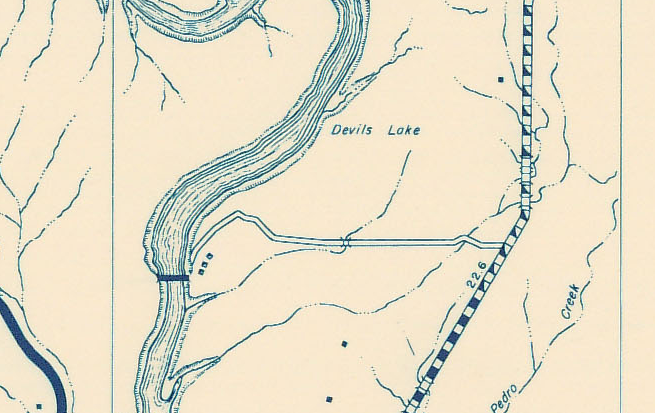
The dirt road which preceded RE 2. Four Recreational Roads, 2, 8, 11, and 255, followed the course of pre-existing roads.

The Recreational Road System began on April 1, 1970, when TxDOT Minute Order 63535 was passed, designating RE 255 and RE 2. Two weeks later, on April 15, TxDOT approved the route of RE 255, and authorized its creation. On May 7, 1970, TxDOT designated RE 3, and on June 1 of the same year, both RE 2 and RE 3 were approved for creation. On September 1, RE 4 was designated, and was approved on October 15, 1970. On April 3, 1972, RE 5 was designated, and was approved less than two weeks later. In October of the same year, RE 6 was designated and approved. On April 3, 1981, RE 7 was designated and approved. On the same day, RE 8, was designated, and in June of that year, it was approved. On October 31, 1996, RE 9 and RE 10, were designated, and these routes were approved on December 20. RE 11, was the last route to be created; it was approved on December 20, 1996. On July 10, 2012, RE 5 was canceled from the system, and turned over to the control of Polk County. It is currently the only Recreational Road to have been completely canceled. RE 255 and RE 8 are the only routes in the system that have been edited.

=== System description ===
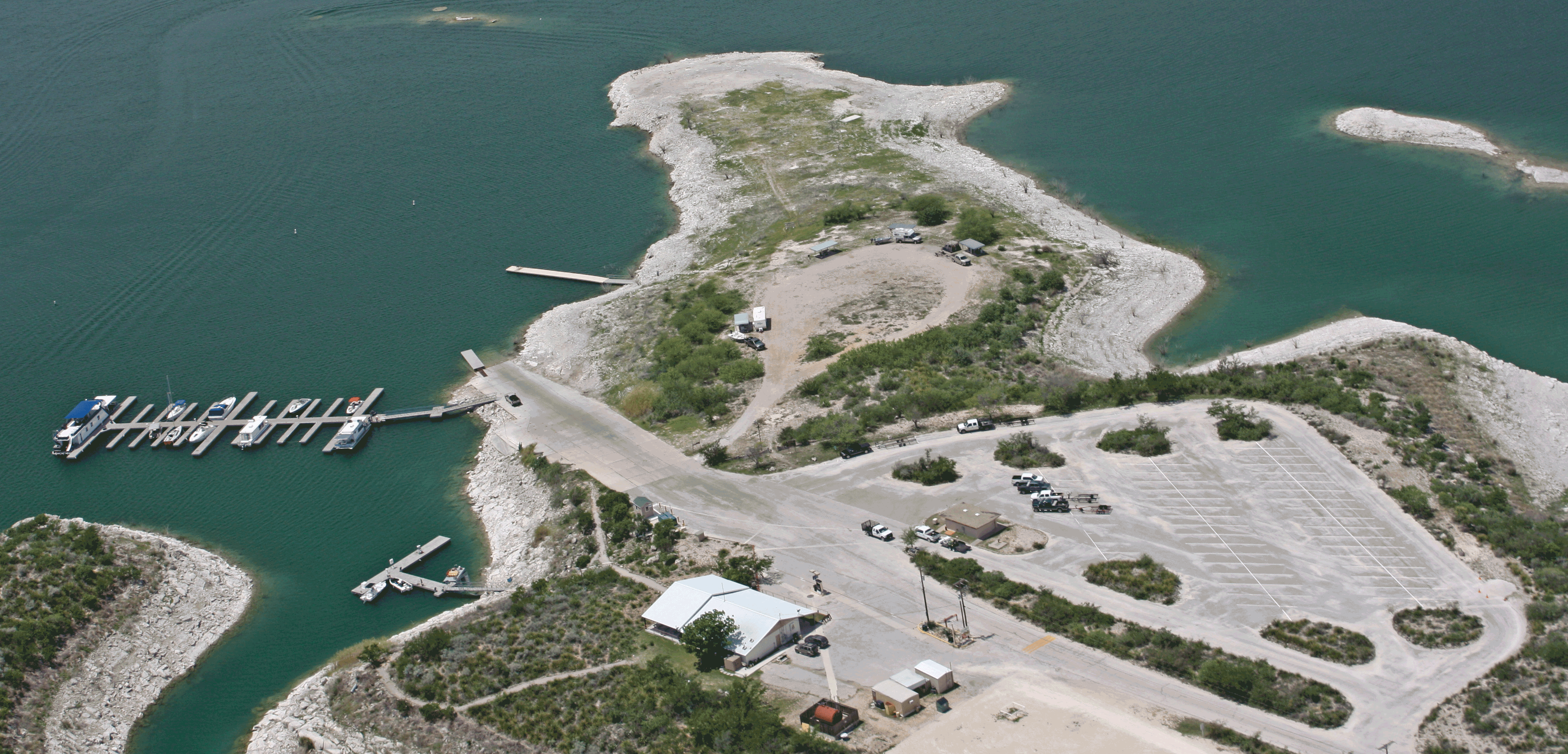
Recreational Roads are designed to connect public recreation areas, apart from state parks, to other Texas highways. Recreational Road 2 serves the Rough Canyon marina and campground (pictured) in Amistad National Recreation Area.

The system is maintained and overseen by TxDOT. The department defines a route on the system as a "roadway to a recognized recreational area, so designated by the Texas Transportation Commission"; routes on the system are very similar to those on the Park Road system, except that a Park Road is defined as "Roadway to a recognized state or national park". Currently, RE 8 is the only route which deviates from the system, as it serves Choke Canyon State Park. The system makes up 80.5 miles (129.6 km) of Texas' state highway system; the longest Recreational Road is RE 255, at approximately 56.6 miles (91.1 km), while the shortest route in the system is RE 6 at just 0.3 miles (480 m).

Recreational Roads are signed with a reassurance marker, or highway shield, that is very similar to the one used for the Farm to Market Road System. The Recreational Road marker, like the Farm to Market Road shield, is rectangular, with the shape of the state of Texas located in the center, with the route number in the center of that. While the FM shield has the word "FARM" located in the top right corner, and the word "ROAD" located in the bottom right corner, the RE shield has the letter "R" located in the top right corner instead. The base color for the FM shield is black, while the base color for the RE shield is brown. The shields are square in shape, with the dimensions of 24 by 24 or 36 by 36 inches (600 mm × 600 mm or 900 mm × 900 mm).

=== Auxiliary routes ===
Recreational Road Spurs (RPs) are a type of auxiliary route for the Recreational Road System. TxDOT defines a Recreational Road Spur as a "roadway which usually begins on an on-system roadway and ends on an off-system roadway". There are currently no Recreational Road Spurs in existence. RE 255 is the only Recreational Road to have had a spur route. The 0.7-mile-long (1,100 m) route was originally designated on February 15, 1970, as FM 255 Spur; it connected FM 255 to the community of Beans through a short, heavily wooded area. The spur was redesignated as RP 255 on March 15, 1974, and was canceled on December 18, 1979.

== Highways ==
=== Recreational Road 2 ===
Recreational Road 2
- Location: Val Verde County
- Length: 7.198 mi (11.584 km)
- Existed: 1970–present

Recreational Road 2 connects U.S. Routes 277 and 377 to the Rough Canyon Recreational Area portion of Amistad National Recreation Area. The road begins at boat-launch ramp on Devils River at the northern end of the Amistad Reservoir. The roadway runs northeasterly past the Rough Canyon Campground, past a small mobile home park, still inside the national recreation area. RE 2 turns directly east at an intersection with Cam Real Road, which connects the route to the community of Devils Shores. The highway exits the park, and continues through the South Texas shrubland, passing a few small roads and homes as well as traveling over several dry creek beds. The highway runs through several miles of shrubland before it reaches its western terminus, an at-grade intersection with US 277/US 377. A primitive dirt road first appeared in the location of RE 2 by 1940. Between 1956 and 1961, the road's surface was improved from gravel to metal and its course had been gradually straightened. RE 2 was designated on June 1, 1970, making it the second route in the system.

=== Recreational Road 3 ===
Recreational Road 3
- Location: Fannin County
- Length: 2.037 mi (3.278 km)
- Existed: 1970–present

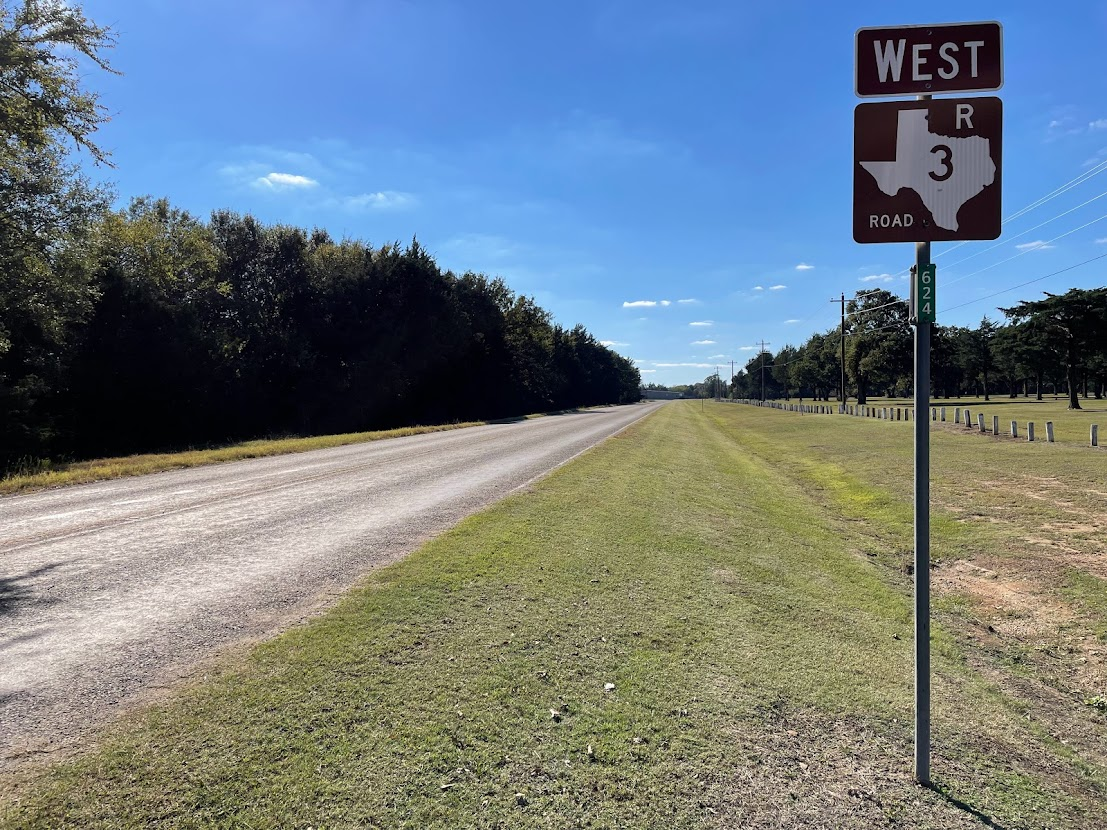
Texas Recreational Road 3 located just north of Bonham

Recreational Road 3 connects FM 273 to Fannin County Road 2610 (CR 2610) and serves Lake Bonham Park. The highway begins at an intersection with FM 273, north of Bonham. From there, the highway travels eastward for approximately 0.1 miles (0.16 km), passing rural areas, before bending northward. The road travels north for about 0.2 miles (0.32 km), passing more rural areas. The highway bends eastward afterward. It passes several small neighborhoods, and parts of Lake Bonham, before turning in a northeast direction. The roadway intersects several county roads before it passes the small Lake Bonham Park and reaches its eastern terminus, an intersection with the Old Bonham Road (CR 2610). RE 3 was designated on June 1, 1970, from an intersection with FM 898 to an intersection with Old Lake Bonham Road, in Fannin County, along its current route. The road was approximately 2.2 miles (3.5 km) in length at the time of designation, but has since been shortened by about 0.2 miles (0.32 km). FM 898 was redesignated as FM 273 on April 1, 2004.

=== Recreational Road 4 ===
Recreational Road 4
- Location: Burleson County
- Length: 3.284 mi (5.285 km)
- Existed: October 15, 1970–present

Recreational Road 4 links Somerville Lake's Big Creek Park to FM 60. The roadway begins at an at-grade intersection with FM 60, northwest of Somerville. The highway proceeds southwest, passing a few small fields before intersecting Burleson County Road 472 (CR 472). The road continues, bending southeastward and passing a few small houses and fields. It proceeds southeast past a few small ranches and it intersects a small road. The roadway continues, passing several houses, on the edge of a small, unnamed community. The roadway continues past a few more small houses and ranches, before intersecting CR 415. The road proceeds southeast, passing a few more ranches, before it intersects CR 416 and continues past a small residential area. The route passes a few more ranches before reaching its southern terminus, the entrance gate to Big Creek Park. A small park road continues from the route. The site provides access to camping and picnic facilities and boat access to Somerville Lake. The U.S. Army Corps of Engineers began construction of Somerville Dam in 1962 and the reservoir was completed in 1968. In addition, the Corps built multiple recreational facilities on the lake, including Big Creek Park and its access road. In 1970, Burleson County officials requested that the state take over the maintenance responsibilities for the route. On September 1, 1970, the State Highway Commission approved the request and on October 15, 1970, RE 4 was officially designated. The highway was approximately 3.4 miles (5.5 km) long when it was originally commissioned; it has since been shortened by slightly more than 0.1 miles (0.16 km).

Junction list

The entire route is in Burleson County.

mi	km	Destinations	Notes
0.000	0.000	FM 60	Northern terminus
1.869	3.008	CR 415	
2.339	3.764	CR 416	
3.284	5.285	Big Creek Park	Southern terminus
1.000 mi = 1.609 km; 1.000 km = 0.621 mi

=== Recreational Road 5 ===
Recreational Road 5
- Location: Polk County
- Length: 0.906 mi (1,458 m)
- Existed: April 15, 1972–July 10, 2012

Recreational Road 5 functioned as the main roadway for Southland Park. The route began at an intersection with FM 1988, south of Lake Livingston, as a two-lane, paved road. Traveling westward, the highway immediately intersected a short dirt track and proceeded to bend to the southwest. On the road's southern shoulder is a Recorded Texas Historic Landmark marker commemorating Indian trails in Polk County. One of those paths, Long King Trace, is believed to have crossed the Trinity River at approximately the location of what was RE 5. The highway passed a few small houses and a small field, while traveling parallel to a small dirt road. RE 5 entered the small Southland Park, where it proceeded southeastward. The road formed a small loop inside the park, passing park facilities, hiking trails, the Trinity River and several parking spaces. The highway continued to its southern terminus, an at-grade intersection with itself at the end of the loop.

The development of Southland Park commenced in late 1969, the same year work on Lake Livingston was completed. In August 1970, Polk County officials requested that the State Highway Commission construct a 1.1-mile (1.8 km) long road to serve the park at a cost of $50,000 (equivalent to $311,000 in 2024). It was not until April 3, 1972, that the Commission approved the proposal; they estimated the construction costs would be about $10,000 more than the original request. RE 5 was officially designated a few days later, on April 15, 1972. By the time of its cancellation, the highway had been shortened by approximately 0.2 miles (0.32 km) from its original length. On July 10, 2012, after an earlier request by Polk County officials, RE 5 was decommissioned and the roadway's jurisdiction was transferred; most of the highway, excluding the loop portion, is currently designated Polk County Road 4320.

=== Recreational Road 6 ===
Recreational Road 6
- Location: Comanche County
- Length: 0.300 mi (483 m)
- Existed: October 15, 1972–present

Recreational Road 6 connects FM 1476 to Sowell Creek Park. The park is operated by the Corps of Engineers and contains camping and picnic areas and a public-access boat ramp. RE 6 begins at the entrance to the recreation area, at an at-grade intersection with the main park road, as a two-lane, paved route. It runs in a straight line northeastward from this point, while Comanche County Road 5132 proceeds southward from the highway's terminus as an unpaved dirt roadway. Traveling from the intersection, RE 6 passes a small house to the east. The route continues through lightly wooded fields on both side, while functioning as the eastern border for Sowell Creek Park. The roadway continues to its northern terminus, an at-grade intersection with FM 1476. At 0.3 miles (0.48 km) in length, the highway is currently the shortest route in the Recreational Road System. The Corps of Engineers began developing Proctor Lake in 1960, and constructed several parks, including Sowell Creek, in the following years. The state highway commission designated RE 6 at its present location on October 5, 1972, and the highway was officially approved on October 15, 1972; the route was expected to cost approximately $10,000 (equivalent to $57,000 in 2024). The road has not since been significantly extended or rerouted.

Junction list

The entire route is in Comanche County.

mi	km	Destinations	Notes
0.000	0.000	CR 5132; Entrance to Sowell Creek Park	Southern terminus
0.300	0.483	FM 1476	Northern terminus
1.000 mi = 1.609 km; 1.000 km = 0.621 mi

=== Recreational Road 7 ===
Recreational Road 7
- Location: McMullen County
- Length: 2.400 mi (3.862 km)
- Existed: April 3, 1981–present

Recreational Road 7 connects SH 72 to a recreational area on Choke Canyon Reservoir. The highway begins at an at-grade intersection with SH 72, located several miles east of the unincorporated community of Tilden, as a two-lane, paved road. McMullen County Road 304 (CR 304) proceeds southward from the intersection. RE 7 travels northward for a very short distance, before turning northeastward, proceeding through rural areas. The road continues past a small reservoir and an oil drilling station before reentering rural land and following northeast to its northern terminus, the designated end of state maintenance. A short park road continues northeasterly to the reservoir, and ends at a boat-launch ramp. RE 7 was approved on April 3, 1981, traveling in its present location from SH 72 to Choke Canyon Reservoir, and was designated later that year. The highway has not since been extended or rerouted.

Junction list

The entire route is in McMullen County.

mi	km	Destinations	Notes
0.000	0.000	SH 72	Southern terminus
2.400	3.862	James E. Daughtrey WMA	Northern terminus; road continues into park
1.000 mi = 1.609 km; 1.000 km = 0.621 mi

=== Recreational Road 8 ===
Recreational Road 8
- Location: McMullen County
- Length: 1.058 mi (1.703 km)
- Existed: 1981–present

Recreational Road 8 connects SH 72 to the community of Calliham and Choke Canyon State Park. The highway begins at an intersection with SH 72, near Calliham, as a two-lane, paved road. The roadway proceeds northward, passing a large field before entering Calliham, and passing a few small houses. The road continues northward, passing several houses and businesses, and intersecting several small roads. RE 8 continues past more houses and businesses and a small trailer park, and intersecting several small roads. The road continues north, passing a small field and a few more houses, before reaching its northern terminus, an intersection with Quail Run. A park road continues northward through Choke Canyon State Park, passing several campgrounds and ending at a small loop near the reservoir.

Recreational Road 8 was approved on April 3, 1981, and was officially designated on June 15, 1981. The original route traveled from FM 99 southward approximately 1.6 miles (2.6 km) to the Choke Canyon Reservoir, due to the relocation of FM 99.This designation replaced an original designation as FM 99. On June 29, 1983, the relocation of the route was approved, and on August 16, 1983, the original designation was canceled, and RE 8 was transferred to its present location on the southern side of the reservoir.

=== Recreational Road 9 ===
Recreational Road 9
- Location: Coleman County
- Length: 1.291 mi (2.078 km)
- Existed: 1993–present

Recreational Road 9 connects FM 2134 to a recreational area on the O.H. Ivie Reservoir. The highway begins at an intersection with FM 2134, near Talpa, as a two-lane, paved road. RE 9 proceeds northwest, passing through rural areas. The roadway bends westward and proceeds through more rural land, passing two oil drilling sites and intersecting a private dirt county road. The highway continues through more rural areas, where it passes a small pond and intersects CR 329. The road continues west, entering Padgitt Park and intersecting two short, unpaved park roads before it passes a few trails. The highway intersects a small dirt road before reaching its western terminus, the designated end of state maintenance. A park road continues a very brief distance westward, proceeding to a boat-launch ramp located on the O. H. Ivie Reservoir. Recreational Road 9 approved on October 31, 1993, and was officially designated on December 20, 1993, in its current location, traveling from FM 2134 westward to Padgitt Park, with a length of 1.4 miles (2.3 km). The highway has since been shortened by appropriately 0.2 miles (0.32 km) in length.

Junction list

The entire route is in Coleman County.

mi	km	Destinations	Notes
0.000	0.000	FM 2134	Eastern terminus
0.923	1.485	CR 329	Southern terminus of CR 329
1.291	2.078	Padgitt Park	Western terminus
1.000 mi = 1.609 km; 1.000 km = 0.621 mi

=== Recreational Road 10 ===
Recreational Road 10
- Location: Coleman County
- Length: 1.070 mi (1.722 km)
- Existed: December 10, 1996–present

Recreational Road 10 connects FM 1929 to Kennedy Park on the O.H. Ivie Reservoir. The highway begins at an intersection with FM 1929, south of the O. H. Ivie Reservoir, as a two-lane, paved road. RE 10 proceeds northward, passing a four small buildings and intersecting two unpaved county roads. The road bends northwest, splitting from a small dirt road and proceeding through rural brushland, where it enters Kennedy Park. The highway bends around several small buildings, and intersects a few roads, which make up part of the Elm Creek Village. It also intersects an unpaved park road which leads to several campgrounds. The road intersects Elm Creek Croad, and bends eastward. The route passes several park facilities before reaching its northern terminus, the designated end of state maintenance, at a small parking lot. A road continues a short distance northward, proceeding to a boat-launch ramp located on the O.H. Ivie Reservoir. Recreational Road 10 was approved on October 31, 1996, and was officially designated on December 10, 1996, to its current location, traveling from FM 1929 northward to Kennedy Park. The route's original length was approximately 0.8 miles (1.3 km), which has since been extended by about 0.2 miles (0.32 km).

Junction list

The entire route is in Coleman County.

mi	km	Destinations	Notes
0.000	0.000	FM 1929	Southern terminus
0.062	0.100	CR 332 (Julie Road)	Western terminus of CR 332
0.156	0.251	CR 318 (Redwire Street)	Northern terminus of CR 318
1.070	1.722	Kennedy Park	Northern terminus
1.000 mi = 1.609 km; 1.000 km = 0.621 mi

=== Recreational Road 11 ===
Recreational Road 11
- Location: Concho County
- Length: 4.251 mi (6.841 km)
- Existed: 1996–present

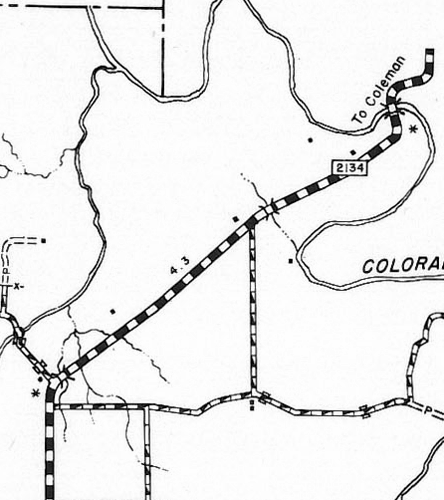
A map of FM 2134 in 1961. The road preceded RE 11. Only RE 2, RE 8, and RE 11 roughly followed the course of pre-existing routes

Recreational Road 11 connects FM 1929 to a recreational area on the O.H. Ivie Reservoir. The highway begins at an intersection with FM 1929, south of the O. H. Ivie Reservoir, as a two-lane, paved road. RE 11 proceeds northward, passing through rural areas on a large peninsula and intersecting a few private ranch roads. The road continues northward, passing more rural areas, where it intersects Concho County Highway 4763 (CR 3763). The highway continues northward through more rural land before bending northeast and intersecting the route of former RM 2134. The road proceeds northeast, though rural area, before intersecting CR 4763, and bending northward. The roadway continues northward, intersecting a few small park roads before bending northwest. The road proceeds northwest, passing campgrounds and other park facilities before passing a parking lot and a boat-launch ramp. The route proceeds to its northern terminus, a separate boat launch ramp on the coast of O.H. Ivie Reservoir.

Two separate roads first appeared by 1940 along a portion of where RE 11 is currently located. Both roads were graded and gravel surfaced. On August 24, 1955, RM 2134 was designated along the northern road segment. By 1956, the route's surface was improved to stone, and on December 1, 1957, RM 2134 was extended. By 1961, the portion designated as RM 2134 had been upgraded to a bituminous surface and other road segment had been upgraded to a metal surface. The RM 2134 designation was removed from the roadway by 1990, due to the construction of the O.H. Ivie Reservoir over portions of the roadway. Recreational Road 11 was designated on December 20, 1996, in its current location, traveling from FM 1929 northward to the Concho Recreation Area.

=== Recreational Road 255 ===
Recreational Road 255
- Location: Tyler, Jasper and Newton counties
- Length: 56.596 mi (91.082 km)
- Existed: 1970–present

Recreational Road 255 is located in Tyler, Jasper, and Newton counties, in the southeastern region of Texas. The highway is approximately 56.6 miles (91.1 km) long, and travels through mainly rural areas in the northern portion of the three counties. RE 255 begins at an intersection with US 69 in Tyler County, near the city of Colmesneil. The route travels through rural farmland in northern Tyler County, where it intersects numerous county roads before it crosses the Neches River into Jasper County. The roadway intersects SH 63 and US 96, and helps form part of the Sam Rayburn Dam. The road passes through several small communities while in Jasper County. The route continues into Newton County, where it intersects SH 87 and travels through additional forested rural areas before terminating at an intersection with Farm to Market Road 692 (FM 692), near the Louisiana state line. RE 255 provides access to much of the southern portion of Angelina National Forest, the Sam Rayburn Reservoir, and the Toledo Bend Reservoir. The highway also provides access to several small recreational areas along both lakes.

Recreational Road 255 began as Farm to Market Road 255, with the first section of the route being designated in 1945. Throughout the 1950s and the 1960s, FM 255 was extended multiple times, with the final extension being made in early 1970. The first stretch of RE 255 was designated over FM 255 on April 1, 1970, creating the first Recreational Road. The highway was extended three more times in the 1970s, completely replacing FM 255.

==== Recreational Road 255 Spur ====
Recreational Road 255 Spur
- Location: Beans, Jasper County
- Length: 0.700 mi (1,127 m)
- Existed: February 15, 1970–December 12, 1979

FM 255 had a short spur that was designated in 1970, and was transferred over to RE 255 in 1974 when the main route was replaced. RE 255 Spur was canceled in 1979.
