= Sam Rayburn, Texas =

Census-designated place in Jasper County, Texas, United States

- Census-designated place
- Location within Texas Location within the United States
- Coordinates: 31°04′42″N 94°00′45″W
- Country: United States
- State: Texas
- County: Jasper

Area
  - Total: 9.931 sq mi (25.72 km^{2})
  - Land: 8.469 sq mi (21.93 km^{2})
  - Water: 1.462 sq mi (3.79 km^{2})
- Elevation: 190 ft (58 m)

Population (2020)
  - Total: 1,273
  - Density: 150.3/sq mi (58.04/km^{2})
- Time zone: UTC-6 (Central (CST))
  - Summer (DST): UTC-5 (CDT)
- Area code: 409
- GNIS feature ID: 2586983

Sam Rayburn is a census-designated place (CDP) in Jasper County, Texas, United States. Its population was 1,273 as of the 2020 census.

== Description ==
The community, which is also known as Rayburn Country, is located on the south shore of the Sam Rayburn Reservoir at the junction of Texas Recreational Road 255 and Farm to Market Road 1007. Sam Rayburn was founded in the 1970s after the formation of the reservoir; its main attraction is its country club, Rayburn Country.

== Demographics ==
Historical population
Census	Pop.	Note	%±
2010	1,181		—
2020	1,273		7.8%
U.S. Decennial Census; 1850–1900 1910; 1920 1930 1940; 1950 1960 1970; 1980 1990 2000; 2010 2020

Sam Rayburn first appeared as a census designated place in the 2010 U.S. census.

Sam Rayburn CDP, Texas – Racial and ethnic composition Note: the US Census treats Hispanic/Latino as an ethnic category. This table excludes Latinos from the racial categories and assigns them to a separate category. Hispanics/Latinos may be of any race.
Race / Ethnicity (NH = Non-Hispanic)	Pop 2010	Pop 2020	% 2010	% 2020
White alone (NH)	1,054	1,183	89.25%	92.93%
Black or African American alone (NH)	24	10	2.03%	0.79%
Native American or Alaska Native alone (NH)	6	5	0.51%	0.39%
Asian alone (NH)	6	1	0.51%	0.08%
Native Hawaiian or Pacific Islander alone (NH)	0	2	0.00%	0.16%
Other race alone (NH)	0	3	0.00%	0.24%
Mixed race or Multiracial (NH)	22	38	1.86%	2.99%
Hispanic or Latino (any race)	69	31	5.84%	2.44%
Total	1,181	1,273	100.00%	100.00%

As of the 2020 United States census, there were 1,273 people, 429 households, and 315 families residing in the CDP.

== Education ==
A portion of the CDP is in the Brookeland Independent School District and the other is in the Jasper Independent School District.

== See also ==
- List of census-designated places in Texas
