= Science Hall, Jasper County, Texas =

Unincorporated community in Texas, United States

Coordinates: 30°52′00″N 94°07′03″W

Science Hall was an unincorporated community in Jasper County, Texas, United States. It is located on Farm to Market Road 777 and U.S. Highway 190.

== History ==
Science Hall was formerly a school community. By 1986, the town was closely identified with the nearby town of Beech Grove. A convenience store remained at that time at the cross road.

== Education ==
Jasper Independent School District serves students.
