= Brookeland High School =

Coordinates: 31.1499°N 93.9934°W

Location
- 187 Wildcat Walk; Brookeland, Texas 75931-0008; United States

Information
- School type: Public high school
- School district: Brookeland Independent School District
- Principal: Brandon Shumake
- Teaching staff: 19.19 (FTE)
- Grades: 6-12
- Enrollment: 174 (2023-2024)
- Student to teacher ratio: 9.07
- Colors: Blue & Gold
- Athletics conference: UIL Class A
- Mascot: Wildcat
- Newspaper: Big Blue Gazette
- Yearbook: The Wildcat
- Website: Brookeland High School

Brookeland High School is a public high school in unincorporated Brookeland, Texas, United States and classified as a 1A school by the UIL. It is part of the Brookeland Independent School District which is located mainly in northeastern Jasper County. In 2015, the school was rated "Met Standard" by the Texas Education Agency.

== Athletics ==
The Brookeland Wildcats compete in these sports -

Cross Country, Basketball, Golf, Tennis, Track, Softball & Baseball

=== State Titles ===
- Boys Basketball -
  - 2000(1A)

==== State Finalists ====
- Softball
  - 2026(1A)
