= Applegate, Texas =

Ghost town in Texas, US

Applegate is a ghost town in Jasper County, Texas, United States. It was established as a company town in 1905, by logger and officer H. D. Applegate, following a northward extension the Gulf, Beaumont and Great Northern Railway in 1901 and 1902. Much of its land was owned by the Texas and Ohio Lumber Company, but was less profitable than other areas. The company put the land in receivership, and the 300 people living there—in 1912—were evicted, and the community was abandoned.
