= Ebenezer, Texas =

Ebenezer, Texas may refer to the following places in Texas:

- Ebenezer, Camp County, Texas
- Ebenezer, Jasper County, Texas
