= Farm to Market Road 255 =

There are two routes in the state of Texas formerly numbered Farm to Market Road 255:

- FM 255 (1945–1978), which was redesignated Recreational Road 255
- FM 255 (1989–2005), which became part of Texas State Highway 255, the former Camino Colombia Toll Road
