= Jasper High School (Jasper, Texas) =

Coordinates: 30.9028°N 94.0066°W

Location
- 400 Bulldog Lane; Jasper, Texas 75951-4946; United States

Information
- School type: Public high school
- School district: Jasper Independent School District
- Principal: Victor Williams
- Teaching staff: 51.74 (FTE)
- Grades: 9-12
- Enrollment: 673 (2023–2024)
- Student to teacher ratio: 13.01
- Colors: Crimson & White
- Athletics conference: UIL Class AAAA
- Mascot: Bulldog
- Yearbook: Bulldog Tale
- Website: Jasper High School

Jasper High School is a public high school located in Jasper, Texas, classified as a 4A school by the University Interscholastic League. It is part of the Jasper Independent School District and serves students in north and central Jasper County. In 2015, the school was rated "Met Standard" by the Texas Education Agency.

== Athletics ==
The Jasper Bulldogs compete in these sports:

- Cross country
- Volleyball
- Football
- Basketball
- Powerlifting
- Soccer
- Golf
- Tennis
- Track
- Baseball
- Softball

=== State titles ===
- Baseball -
  - 2007(3A) Coaches Shawn Mixon, Steve Smith, Joey Brown, David Ford
- Girls golf -
  - 1982(4A)
- Boys track -
  - 1973(3A), 1985(4A), 1991(4A), 1997(4A)
- Girls track
  - 1991(4A)
- Boys powerlifting -
  - 1991, 1992(Div. 1), 1999(Div. 1)
- Cheerleading- 2016 UIL 4A state champions

== Other extracurricular activities ==
Jasper High School also has several other activities, including one-act plays, DECA, and FFA.

== Notable alumni ==
- Sam Adams - NFL
- Max Alvis - MLB
- Derick Armstrong - NFL
- Ben Bronson - NFL
- Zack Bronson - NFL
- Red Bryant - NFL
- John Davis - NFL
- James Hadnot - NFL
- Phil Hennigan - MLB
- Eugene Seale - NFL
- Sean Weatherspoon - NFL
