= Bevilport, Texas =

Bevilport
- Unincorporated Community
- Interactive map of Bevilport
- Location within Texas Bevilport (the United States)
- Coordinates: 30°55′24″N 94°9′19″W
- Country: United States
- State: Texas
- County: Jasper County
- Elevation: 98 ft (30 m)
- Postal code: 75951

Bevilport is an unincorporated community located along Farm Road 2799 and the Angelina River in Jasper County, Texas, United States.

== History ==
The community is named after a Virginian immigrant named John Bevil who migrated to Texas and had a population of 140 in 1831. The community was initially a river navigation point that shipped cotton from the East of Texas as well as hides to New Orleans via flatboats and keelboats during 1830 to 1860. General Sam Houston purchased the first lot in the community. By 1835, Bevilport had a mail station and a hotel and a main street by the 1850s, when the community served as a business and social center. During high-water seasons, the community was utilized as a freight depot for the northern part of the Jasper county. Activity within the community declined in the 1870s when the logging for Beaumont sawmills began to interfere with the river transportation on Neches River. A post office was built within Bevilport in 1854, which would then close in 1866, reopen in 1897, then permanently close in 1899.

A historical marker for the community was built in 1936. By the 1980s, only a few houses and two churches remain in the community.
