= Upland Island Wilderness =

Wilderness area in Texas, United States

- IUCN category Ib (wilderness area)
- Location within the United States
- Location: Texas, United States
- Nearest city: Lufkin, TX
- Coordinates: 31°4′10″N 94°21′31″W
- Area: 13,331 acres (5,395 ha)
- Established: October 30, 1984
- Governing body: U.S. Forest Service
- Website: Angelina N.F. - Upland Island & Turkey Hill Wilderness Areas

Upland Island Wilderness is one of five designated wilderness areas managed by the U.S. Forest Service in East Texas. The 13,331-acre (53.95 km^{2}) wilderness is located in Angelina and Jasper Counties and is part of Angelina National Forest. The area was named by conservationist Edward C. Fritz, who led the effort to designate wilderness areas in East Texas in 1984.

== Ecosystems ==
The wilderness contains a diverse range of ecosystems, from park-like upland forests of longleaf pine and pitcher plant bogs with wild azaleas and orchids to bottomland hardwood forests and palmetto flats along the Neches River.

== Maintenance ==
The primitive landscape has been relatively untouched, and the Forest Service has managed to keep the area natural with the help of regulations and prohibited activities. It is their effort to keep the designated land clean and natural.
