= Browndell, Texas =

- City
- Interactive map of Browndell, Texas
- Coordinates: 31°07′16″N 93°58′47″W
- Country: United States
- State: Texas
- County: Jasper

Area
  - Total: 2.44 sq mi (6.33 km^{2})
  - Land: 2.44 sq mi (6.33 km^{2})
  - Water: 0 sq mi (0.00 km^{2})
- Elevation: 226 ft (69 m)

Population (2020)
  - Total: 160
  - Density: 84.3/sq mi (32.55/km^{2})
- Time zone: UTC-6 (Central (CST))
  - Summer (DST): UTC-5 (CDT)
- ZIP Code: 75931
- FIPS code: 48-10708
- GNIS feature ID: 2409920

Browndell is a city in Jasper County, Texas, United States. The population was 160 at the 2020 census.

== Geography ==
Browndell is located in northern Jasper County. U.S. Route 96 runs along the western border of the city, leading south 15 miles (24 km) to Jasper, the county seat, and north 9 miles (14 km) to Pineland. The community is 2 miles (3 km) east of the Sam Rayburn Reservoir.

According to the United States Census Bureau, the city has a total area of 2.4 square miles (6.3 km^{2}), all land.

== Demographics ==
Historical population
Census	Pop.	Note	%±
1970	243		—
1980	228		−6.2%
1990	192		−15.8%
2000	219		14.1%
2010	197		−10.0%
2020	160		−18.8%
U.S. Decennial Census

=== Racial and ethnic composition ===
Browndell city, Texas – Racial and ethnic composition Note: the US Census treats Hispanic/Latino as an ethnic category. This table excludes Latinos from the racial categories and assigns them to a separate category. Hispanics/Latinos may be of any race.
Race / Ethnicity (NH = Non-Hispanic)	Pop 2000	Pop 2010	Pop 2020	% 2000	% 2010	% 2020
White alone (NH)	84	95	76	38.36%	48.22%	47.50%
Black or African American alone (NH)	133	87	78	60.73%	44.16%	48.75%
Native American or Alaska Native alone (NH)	0	0	0	0.00%	0.00%	0.00%
Asian alone (NH)	0	0	1	0.00%	0.00%	0.63%
Pacific Islander alone (NH)	0	0	1	0.00%	0.00%	0.63%
Other Race alone (NH)	0	0	0	0.00%	0.00%	0.00%
Mixed race or Multiracial (NH)	2	8	2	0.91%	4.06%	1.25%
Hispanic or Latino (any race)	0	7	2	0.00%	3.55%	1.25%
Total	219	197	160	100.00%	100.00%	100.00%

=== 2020 census ===
As of the 2020 census, Browndell had a population of 160, with 62 households and 41 families residing in the city. The median age was 43.5 years, with 24.4% of residents under the age of 18 and 18.8% 65 years of age or older. For every 100 females there were 92.8 males, and for every 100 females age 18 and over there were 80.6 males age 18 and over.

0% of residents lived in urban areas, while 100.0% lived in rural areas.

There were 62 households in Browndell, of which 29.0% had children under the age of 18 living in them. Of all households, 43.5% were married-couple households, 12.9% were households with a male householder and no spouse or partner present, and 41.9% were households with a female householder and no spouse or partner present. About 19.3% of all households were made up of individuals and 9.7% had someone living alone who was 65 years of age or older.

There were 83 housing units, of which 25.3% were vacant. Among occupied housing units, 85.5% were owner-occupied and 14.5% were renter-occupied. The homeowner vacancy rate was <0.1% and the rental vacancy rate was 10.0%.

Racial composition as of the 2020 census
Race	Percent
White	47.5%
Black or African American	48.8%
American Indian and Alaska Native	0%
Asian	0.6%
Native Hawaiian and Other Pacific Islander	0.6%
Some other race	0%
Two or more races	2.5%
Hispanic or Latino (of any race)	1.2%

=== 2000 census ===
As of the census of 2000, there were 219 people, 79 households, and 54 families residing in the city. The population density was 90.5 inhabitants per square mile (34.9/km^{2}). There were 118 housing units at an average density of 48.7 per square mile (18.8/km^{2}). The racial makeup of the city was 38.36% White, 60.73% African American, and 0.91% from two or more races.

There were 79 households, out of which 29.1% had children under the age of 18 living with them, 43.0% were married couples living together, 24.1% had a female householder with no husband present, and 30.4% were non-families. 26.6% of all households were made up of individuals, and 12.7% had someone living alone who was 65 years of age or older. The average household size was 2.77 and the average family size was 3.35.

In the city, the population was spread out, with 29.2% under the age of 18, 5.9% from 18 to 24, 28.8% from 25 to 44, 21.9% from 45 to 64, and 14.2% who were 65 years of age or older. The median age was 38 years. For every 100 females, there were 95.5 males. For every 100 females age 18 and over, there were 82.4 males.

The median income for a household in the city was $25,313, and the median income for a family was $29,583. Males had a median income of $27,500 versus $15,804 for females. The per capita income for the city was $11,229. About 15.3% of families and 14.3% of the population were below the poverty line, including 8.5% of those under the age of eighteen and 31.0% of those 65 or over.

== Education ==
Browndell is served by the Brookeland Independent School District.
