= Mayflower, Newton County, Texas =

Unincorporated community in Newton County, Texas, United States

- Unincorporated community
- Location within Texas Location within the United States
- Coordinates: 31°05′40″N 93°43′46″W
- Country: United States
- State: Texas
- County: Newton
- Elevation: 384 ft (117 m)

Population (as of 2000 per Handbook of Texas)
  - Total: 100
- Time zone: UTC-6 (Central (CST))
  - Summer (DST): UTC-5 (CDT)
- GNIS feature ID: 1380159

Mayflower is an unincorporated community in Newton County, Texas, United States. It is located at the junction of Texas State Highway 87 and Texas Recreational Road 255.

== See also ==
- List of unincorporated communities in Texas
