= Red Bryant =

American football player (born 1984)

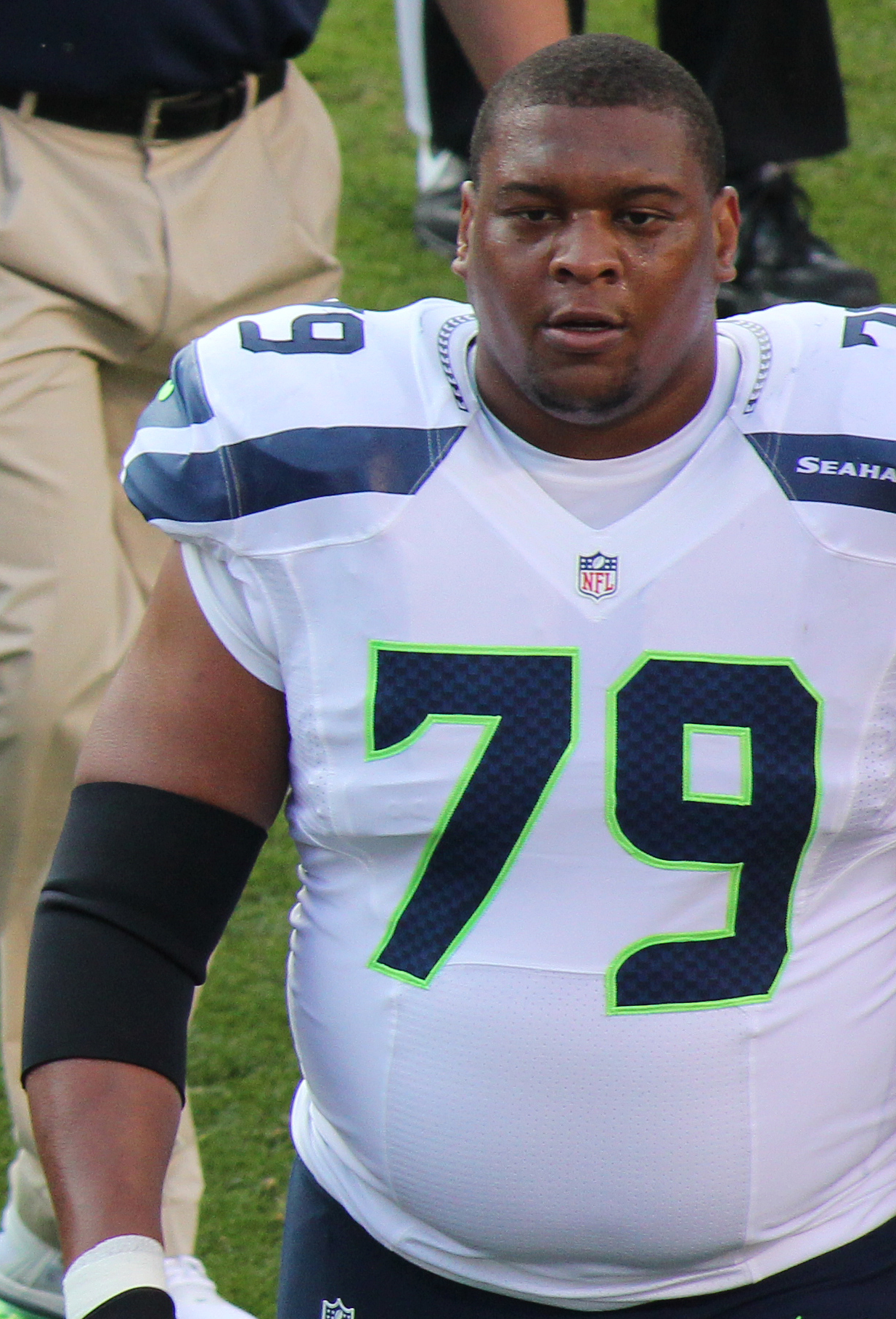
- Bryant with the Seattle Seahawks in 2012

No. 79, 71
- Positions: Defensive tackle, defensive end

Personal information
- Born: April 18, 1984 (age 42); Jasper, Texas, U.S.
- Listed height: 6 ft 4 in (1.93 m)
- Listed weight: 323 lb (147 kg)

Career information
- High school: Jasper
- College: Texas A&M
- NFL draft: 2008: 4th round, 121st overall pick

Career history
- Seattle Seahawks (2008–2013); Jacksonville Jaguars (2014); Buffalo Bills (2015)*; Arizona Cardinals (2015)
- * Offseason or practice squad member only

Awards and highlights
- Super Bowl champion (XLVIII)

Career NFL statistics
- Total tackles: 148
- Sacks: 4.5
- Forced fumbles: 2
- Fumble recoveries: 2
- Interceptions: 2
- Defensive touchdowns: 1
- Stats at Pro Football Reference

Joseph Anthony "Red" Bryant (born April 18, 1984) is an American former professional football player who was a defensive tackle in the National Football League (NFL). He played college football for the Texas A&M Aggies, and was selected by the Seattle Seahawks in the fourth round of the 2008 NFL draft. Bryant was also a member of the Jacksonville Jaguars, Buffalo Bills and Arizona Cardinals.

== Early life ==
Born and raised in Jasper, Texas, Bryant graduated from Jasper High School in 2003. where he was a three-sport star in football, basketball, and track. In football, he was named the District Defensive Player of the Year as well as the Southeast Texas Defensive Player of the Year by The Beaumont Enterprise as a sophomore. As a junior, he made 94 tackles and forced 10 sacks. In his senior year, he earned District and Golden Triangle Defensive MVP honors. He was also selected to the first-team Division 3A All-state team by the Texas Sports Writers Association, and was a finalist for the Willie Ray Smith Award, which is presented to the top offensive and defensive players in Southeast Texas.

Also an standout track & field athlete, Bryant was one of the state's top performers in the throwing events. He captured the state title in the shot put event at the 2003 UIL T&F Championships, recording a career-best throw of 62 ft 10 in (19.20 m). He also competed in the discus throw (top-throw of 158 ft 4 in). In addition, he also ran the 40-yard dash under 5 seconds, bench-pressed 350 pounds and squatted 520.

When it came to college recruiting, Rivals.com gave him a 3-star rating and ranked him No. 83 out of all the Texas players in his 2003 recruiting class. He was recruited for college play by Texas A&M, Arkansas, Colorado, Nebraska, Notre Dame, Oklahoma, and Texas. He chose to sign with Texas A&M to play for head coach Dennis Franchione.

== College career ==
In his first season at Texas A&M in 2003, though Bryant was redshirted, he was named a team captain. In his freshman season, he became a defensive tackle and started in all games. He earned All-American and All-Big 12 honors from The Gridiron Report after making 34 tackles (3.5 of which led to a loss of nine yards), two deflected passes, and a blocked kick. In 33 defensive plays against the option, he was able to hold the opposing team down to 1.85 yards per carry.

In his sophomore season, he started in 10 games, but saw action in all 11. He produced 28 tackles, 7.5 of which led to a loss of yardage, forced two fumbles and three sacks. In 31 plays against the option, he held opposing teams to a minus-27 yards, or minus-0.87-yard average. The Texas A&M defense, however, finished the 2004 season ranked 107th out of 119 Division I teams, after allowing 443.82 offensive yards per game.

In his junior season, he was voted a permanent team captain. He started in 8 games and played in nine before agreeing to end his season by having surgery on his anterior cruciate ligament that he tore. He produced a total of 19 tackles, 1 sack, 1 blocked kick, and 5 pass blocks. When he was benched in the final five games of the season, the Aggie defense gave up 229.2 rushing yards. However, at the end of the season, the defense improved to a national ranking of 46, after allowing 322.62 offensive yards per game.

In his senior season, Bryant recorded 41 tackles, 1 sack that led to a safety, 1 field goal block that led to a touchdown drive, and six stops for losses of 19 yards. In the team's first ten games, he allowed only 43 rushing yards on 42 plays directed at him. The Aggie defense had allowed 160.9 yards per game overall. Along with eight of his Aggie teammates, Bryant received an all-Big 12 Honorable Mention.

After completing his senior season play, Bryant participated in the 2008 Senior Bowl, playing for the South team. At one of the practices prior to the game, he got into a fight with teammate Chris Williams, causing the coaches to break it up. In the game, he recovered one fumble made by quarterback John David Booty. The South team won the game 17–16.

== Professional career ==
Pre-draft measurables
Height	Weight	Arm length	Hand span	40-yard dash	10-yard split	20-yard split	20-yard shuttle	Three-cone drill	Vertical jump	Broad jump	Bench press
6 ft 4 1/8 in (1.93 m)	318 lb (144 kg)	35 3/8 in (0.90 m)	9 1/4 in (0.23 m)	4.90 s	1.70 s	2.79 s	4.64 s	7.75 s	28 in (0.71 m)	9 ft 3 in (2.82 m)	20 reps
All values from NFL Combine/Pro Day

=== Seattle Seahawks ===
He was selected by the Seattle Seahawks in the fourth round of the 2008 NFL draft. Tim Ruskell, the president of the Seahawks, commented: "We're real happy to get Red Bryant. He fills a need for us. This is a big man that can stuff the middle. Coach (Mike) Holmgren has always looked for that guy, and I think we found him with Red." On July 18, he agreed to a contract with the team.

In late July 2008, Bryant injured cartilage in his left knee during one the Seahawks' training camp practices. He underwent surgery and was able to play in Week 1.

He sprained his ankle in the game against the Philadelphia Eagles on November 2, 2008.

In his rookie season, he recorded 8 total tackles, and was inactive for 12 games. In the 2009 season, he compiled 8 more tackles and was inactive for 10 games. During the 2010 offseason, he was moved to defensive end by head coach Pete Carroll. In 2010, Bryant was injured during a week 8 contest against the Oakland Raiders in the 1st half of the game. After the game, Bryant was placed on Injured Reserve for the remainder of the season.

In the 2011 season, he blocked four kicks, breaking the franchise single-season record. In week 15 against the Chicago Bears, Bryant returned an interception for a touchdown after an attempt by Caleb Hanie of the Bears to get the ball away while the quarterback was being pressured. Just before the Seahawks last home game of the season against the San Francisco 49ers on Saturday, December 24 began, Bryant was presented with the club's Steve Largent Award. The Steve Largent Award is given by the Seahawks annually to the team contributor(s) best exemplifying the spirit, dedication, and integrity of former Seahawk wide receiver Steve Largent.

On March 13, 2012, the Seahawks re-signed Bryant to a five-year, $35 million deal with $14.5 million in guaranteed money. In 2012, he started all 16 games making 24 tackles and 3 passes defended. On December 23, in the Seahawks' 42–13 win over the San Francisco 49ers, Bryant blocked a 21-yard field goal attempt by the 49ers' David Akers, and the Seahawks' Richard Sherman returned the blocked kick 90 yards for a touchdown.

Prior to the 2013 season, Bryant adjusted his diet and sleeping habit to become a better player. Bryant was the defensive team captain during the 2012–13 seasons. In 2013, Bryant recorded 1.5 sacks on 34 combines tackles and a pass defended. His efforts helped the Seahawks into Super Bowl XLVIII where their #1 NFL-ranked defense defeated the Denver Broncos 43–8 for their first franchise championship.

Rumors had been circulating for over a week that the Seahawks would release Bryant, and on February 28, 2014, the Seahawks officially announced his release along with wide receiver Sidney Rice. Both moves cleared more than $12 million in cap space for the upcoming season.

=== Jacksonville Jaguars ===
On March 8, 2014, Bryant signed a four-year, $17 million contract with the Jacksonville Jaguars, uniting him with his former defensive coordinator Gus Bradley. Starting all 16 games in 2014, he made 23 tackles with 1 sack, and 1 forced fumble. On March 12, 2015, he was released by the Jaguars.

=== Buffalo Bills ===
Bryant signed with the Buffalo Bills in August 2015 and was released on September 5, 2015.

=== Arizona Cardinals ===
On November 26, 2015, Bryant signed with the Arizona Cardinals. In six games of 2015, he made five tackles. On September 3, 2016, he was released by the Cardinals as part of the final roster cuts.

== NFL career statistics ==
Legend
**Bold**	Career high

=== Regular season ===
Year	Team	Games		Tackles					Interceptions					Fumbles			
Year	Team	GP	GS	Cmb	Solo	Ast	Sck	TFL	Int	Yds	TD	Lng	PD	FF	FR	Yds	TD
2008	SEA	4	0	8	6	2	0.0	0	0	0	0	0	0	0	0	0	0
2009	SEA	6	1	8	6	2	0.0	3	0	0	0	0	0	0	0	0	0
2010	SEA	7	7	18	16	2	1.0	2	0	0	0	0	0	**1**	**2**	0	0
2011	SEA	**16**	**16**	**32**	**20**	12	1.0	2	**2**	**25**	**1**	**20**	2	0	0	0	0
2012	SEA	**16**	**16**	24	14	10	0.0	1	0	0	0	0	**4**	0	0	0	0
2013	SEA	15	15	30	16	**14**	**1.5**	**4**	0	0	0	0	1	0	0	0	0
2014	JAX	**16**	**16**	23	15	8	1.0	2	0	0	0	0	0	**1**	0	0	0
2015	ARI	6	0	5	3	2	0.0	0	0	0	0	0	0	0	0	0	0
		86	71	148	96	52	4.5	14	2	25	1	20	7	2	2	0	0

=== Playoffs ===
Year	Team	Games		Tackles					Interceptions					Fumbles			
Year	Team	GP	GS	Cmb	Solo	Ast	Sck	TFL	Int	Yds	TD	Lng	PD	FF	FR	Yds	TD
2012	SEA	2	**2**	**3**	**1**	**2**	0.0	0	0	0	0	0	0	0	0	0	0
2013	SEA	**3**	**2**	**3**	**1**	**2**	0.0	**1**	0	0	0	0	0	0	0	0	0
2015	ARI	1	0	2	**1**	1	0.0	0	0	0	0	0	0	0	0	0	0
		6	4	8	3	5	0.0	1	0	0	0	0	0	0	0	0	0

== Personal life ==
In December 2007, Bryant graduated from Texas A&M, receiving a degree in agricultural leadership and development. He believes that this was his greatest and most fulfilling achievement. He is also the first college graduate in his immediate family. He also overcame dyslexia.

On February 29, 2009, Bryant married Janelle Green, who is the daughter of former Texas A&M and Seattle Seahawks player Jacob Green. Janelle played for the Texas A&M soccer team from 2002 to 2005.

According to Bryant, he got the nickname "Red" because "his mom said that (he) was a red baby."
