= Texas Recreational Road 2 =

Highway in Texas

Recreational Road 2
- RE 2 highlighted in red

Route information
- Maintained by TxDOT
- Length: 7.198 mi (11.584 km)
- Existed: June 1, 1970–present

Major junctions
- West end: Boat-launch ramp near Rough Canyon Colonia
- East end: US 277 / US 377

Location
- Country: United States
- State: Texas
- Counties: Val Verde

Highway system
- Highways in Texas; Interstate; US; State; Former; Toll; Loops; Spurs; FM/RM; Park; Rec
← PR 2	→ SH 3

Recreational Road 2 (RE 2) is a Recreational Road located in Val Verde County in the southwestern portion of the U.S. state of Texas. The highway is approximately 7.2 miles (11.6 km) in length, and connects the Rough Canyon Colonia portion of the Amistad National Recreation Area to U.S. Highway 277 (US 227) and US 377. The roadway travels through mainly rural areas. A road first appeared in the location of RE 2 around 1940. RE 2 was officially designated in June 1970, and was just the second Recreational Road formed at the time.

== Route description ==
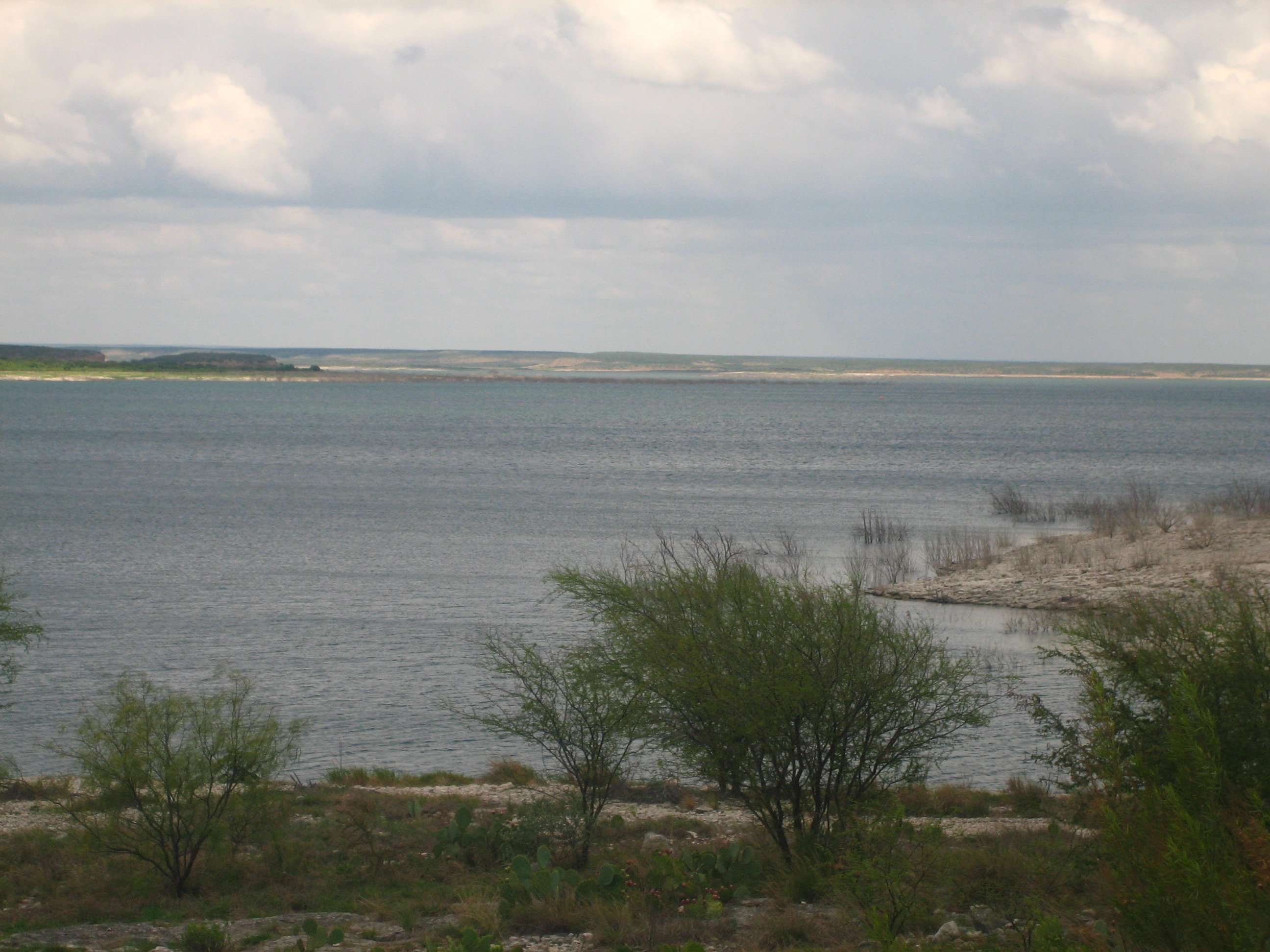
The Amistad Reservoir, served by RE 2

RE 2 begins at the Rough Canyon boat-launch ramp on the Amistad Reservoir in the Rough Canyon Colonia region of the Amistad National Recreation Area. From this terminus, the highway proceeds as a two-lane, paved road, which travels through a small parking lot and turns northeastward. The road continues northeast as it passes the Rough Canyon Marina and the Rough Canyon Colonia camping area on the eastern edge of the park, as well as several houses and independent camp sites. The highway intersects Cam Real Road, which leads to the Devils Shores community and the surrounding area. The route bends eastward, passing the Rough Canyon Inn and a small parking lot and intersecting a small road before it continues into rural areas again. Proceeding along a small ridge, the highway bends northeastward and travels over a small unnamed wash before reaching its eastern terminus with US 277/US 377.

== History ==
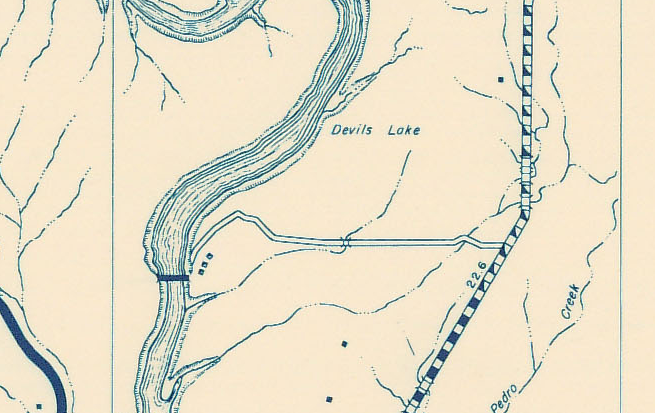
A map of the road preceding RE 2, circa 1940

A road first appeared in the location of RE 2 around 1940. This route was an unimproved dirt track with a primitive bridge over a small creek near the middle of it. The road led to a small community made up of three residential buildings. By 1951, the highway's bridge had been converted to a small concrete dip which allowed the creek to flow through it. The route had been improved to a graded, drained gravel surface by 1956. By 1961, it had been improved to a metaled surface, and had been straightened along the eastern portion. Two additional concrete dips had been constructed, over two small creeks connecting to Devils River. In addition, the community which the road served had expanded to five residential structures and a gate was built at the western end of the highway.

The first serious interest in the road came in mid-1969, when the National Park Service approved a plan to develop the facilities with Amistad. The Rough Canyon and Diablo East portions of the park were given particular focus, since they were the only two that were in existence at the time. Large boat ramps were constructed at both areas, in an attempt to increase tourism.

In early August 1971, several consecutive days of heavy rainfall led to flooding throughout the area. Several highways in the area were damaged, including RE 2. Portions of the highway were completely washed out, which took about two weeks to repair.

On April 1, 1970, RE 2 was officially designated by TxDOT. The highway, along with Recreational Road 255, became the first routes designated as "recreational roads" by the Texas State Highway Department. However, both roadways still had to be approved by the Highway Department's Administration Circle; RE 255 was approved on April 15, 1970, making it the first official highway. RE 2 was approved by the Administration Circle on June 1, 1970, making it the second route officially designated as a recreational road. Since RE 2's designation, each recreational road has been numbered sequentially. Between 1970 and 1972, the highway was paved, and the concrete dips replaced with drainage pipes. One of the route's bends was straightened, shortening it from 7.4 miles (11.9 km) to about 7.2 miles (11.6 km) in length. The highway has not undergone any major rerouting or redesignation since.

== Major intersections ==
The entire highway is in Val Verde County.

Location	mi	km	Destinations	Notes
Rough Canyon Colonia	0.000	0.000	Amistad National Recreation Area boat-launch ramp	Western end of state maintenance
Rough Canyon Colonia	1.009	1.624	Camino Real Street (CR 219)	
Rough Canyon Colonia	1.389	2.235	Alamo Drive (CR 39)	
	7.198	11.584	US 277 / US 377	Eastern terminus
1.000 mi = 1.609 km; 1.000 km = 0.621 mi
