= Burkeville Independent School District =

School district in Texas, United States

Address
- 231 CR 2099 Burkeville, Texas, 75932; United States

District information
- Type: Public
- Grades: PK–12
- Schools: 1
- NCES District ID: 4812150

Students and staff
- Students: 247 (2023–2024)
- Teachers: 21.23 (on an FTE basis) (2023–2024)
- Staff: 22.72 (on an FTE basis) (2023–2024)
- Student–teacher ratio: 11.63 (2023–2024)

Other information
- Website: www.burkevilleisd.org

Burkeville Independent School District is a public school district based in the community of Burkeville, Texas (USA). The district has three campuses - Burkeville High School (Grades 9-12), Burkeville Middle School (Grades 7-8) and Burkeville Elementary School (Grades PK-6).

In 2009, the school district was rated "academically acceptable" by the Texas Education Agency.
