= Beans, Texas =

Unincorporated community in Texas, US

Coordinates: 31°00′22″N 94°10′59″W

Beans (also known as Beans Place, Beans Community, Cross, and Horger) is an unincorporated community in Jasper County, Texas, United States. Beans is located on the west side of the Angelina River, 12 miles (19 km) northwest of Jasper.

The community was founded in 1904 by Ira S. Bean, who initially named its post office Horger, in honor of John Miller Horger. In 1925, the Post Office Department established a new post office for Bean's Place to avoid confusion with the towns of Borger and Spurger; however, the Horger post office did not close until 1929. Beans had a population of 25 through 1944 and was marked on highway maps as Beans Community through the 1980s. From 1970 to 1979, Beans was served by a spur route of Texas Recreational Road 255.
