= Zeirath, Texas =

Ghost town in Texas, USA

Zeirath
- Ghost town
- Location within Texas
- Coordinates: 30°43′50.4″N 93°55′33.2″W
- Country: United States of America
- State: Texas
- County: Jasper County
- Time zone: UTC-6:00 (CST)
  - Summer (DST): UTC-5:00 (CDT)

Zeirath is a ghost town in eastern Jasper County, Texas, United States. The town was located along the Gulf, Beaumont and Kansas City railroad between Jasper and Kirbyville. It disappeared sometime in the 1920s.

== History ==
In 1901, there was a post office in Zeirath. Zeriath had a railroad loading switch in 1905. By 1912, the town was an Electoral precinct. In 1986, some people remained in the town, but there was no community center.
