= Ebenezer, Jasper County, Texas =

Ebenezer, Texas
- Unincorporated community
- Location within Texas Location within the United States
- Coordinates: 31°02′17″N 94°09′40″W
- Country: United States
- State: Texas
- County: Jasper
- Elevation: 148 ft (45 m)
- Time zone: UTC-6 (Central (CST))
  - Summer (DST): UTC-5 (CDT)
- Area code: 409
- GNIS feature ID: 1381830

Ebenezer is an unincorporated community in Jasper County, Texas, United States. Ebenezer is located near Texas Recreational Road 255, 13 miles (21 km) northwest of Jasper. William P. M. and Mary Ann Dean founded the community by 1860 and established a Methodist church and cemetery by 1861. By the 1900s, Ebenezer also had a school. Both the school and the church closed by 1965; the church and cemetery were given historical markers in the 1980s.
