= Angelina National Forest =

National forest in east Texas

- Location within the United States
- Location: Texas, USA
- Nearest city: Lufkin, TX
- Coordinates: 31°16′07″N 94°24′43″W
- Area: 153,180 acres (619.9 km^{2})
- Established: October 13, 1936
- Governing body: U.S. Forest Service
- Website: National Forests in Texas

Angelina National Forest is a United States national forest, one of four located in the piney woods region of Texas. The 153,180-acre (619.9 km^{2}) Angelina National Forest is located in East Texas in parts of San Augustine, Angelina, Jasper and Nacogdoches counties. It is managed together with the three other National Forests in Texas (Davy Crockett, Sabine, and Sam Houston) from Forest Service offices in Lufkin, Texas. There are local district offices located in Zavalla. The forest lies in the Neches River Basin and on the north and south shores of Sam Rayburn Reservoir. Longleaf pine is the predominant cover type in the southern portion of the forest, while loblolly and shortleaf pine are dominant species in the northern portion and abundant throughout.

== History ==
Humans came to the area around 8,000 years ago. Archeological sites document the evidence of man's presence over the entire period since then.

In 1934, the Texas Legislature approved a resolution to urge federal purchase of land to create National Forests in Texas. In 1935, acquisition began on the Davy Crockett, Sam Houston, Sabine and Angelina National Forests.

== Fauna ==
Mammals known from the area include Virginia opossum (Didelphis virginiana), nine-banded armadillo (Dasypus novemcinctus), North American least shrew (Cryptotis parva), eastern mole (Scalopus aquaticus), northern raccoon (Procyon lotor), striped skunk (Mephitis mephitis), northern river otter (Lontra canadensis), bobcat (Lynx rufus), coyote (Canis latrans), gray fox (Urocyon cinereoargenteus), white-tailed deer (Odocoileus virginianus) and others. Among the many species of rodents occurring in the forest are American beaver (Castor canadensis), Baird’s pocket gopher (Geomys breviceps), eastern gray squirrel (Sciurus carolinensis), eastern fox squirrel (Sciurus niger), cotton mouse (Peromyscus gossypinus), and eastern woodrat (Neotoma floridana). Lagomorphs include eastern cottontail (Sylvilagus floridanus), and the swamp rabbit (Sylvilagus aquaticus).

Birds, counting year-round residents, spring and fall migrants, spring and summer nesters, and wintering birds, total nearly 300 species in the forest of southeast Texas. Just a few of the year-round residents include wood duck (Aix sponsa), bald eagle (Haliaeetus leucocephalus), red-shouldered hawk (Buteo lineatus), wild turkey (Meleagris gallopavo), northern bobwhite (Colinus virginianus), mourning dove (Zenaida macroura), American woodcock (Scolopax minor), barred owl (Strix varia), brown-headed nuthatch (Sitta pusilla), pine warbler (Setophaga pinus), and Bachman's sparrow (Peucaea aestivalis). The red-cockaded woodpecker (Dryobates borealis), an endangered species, is found throughout the forest.

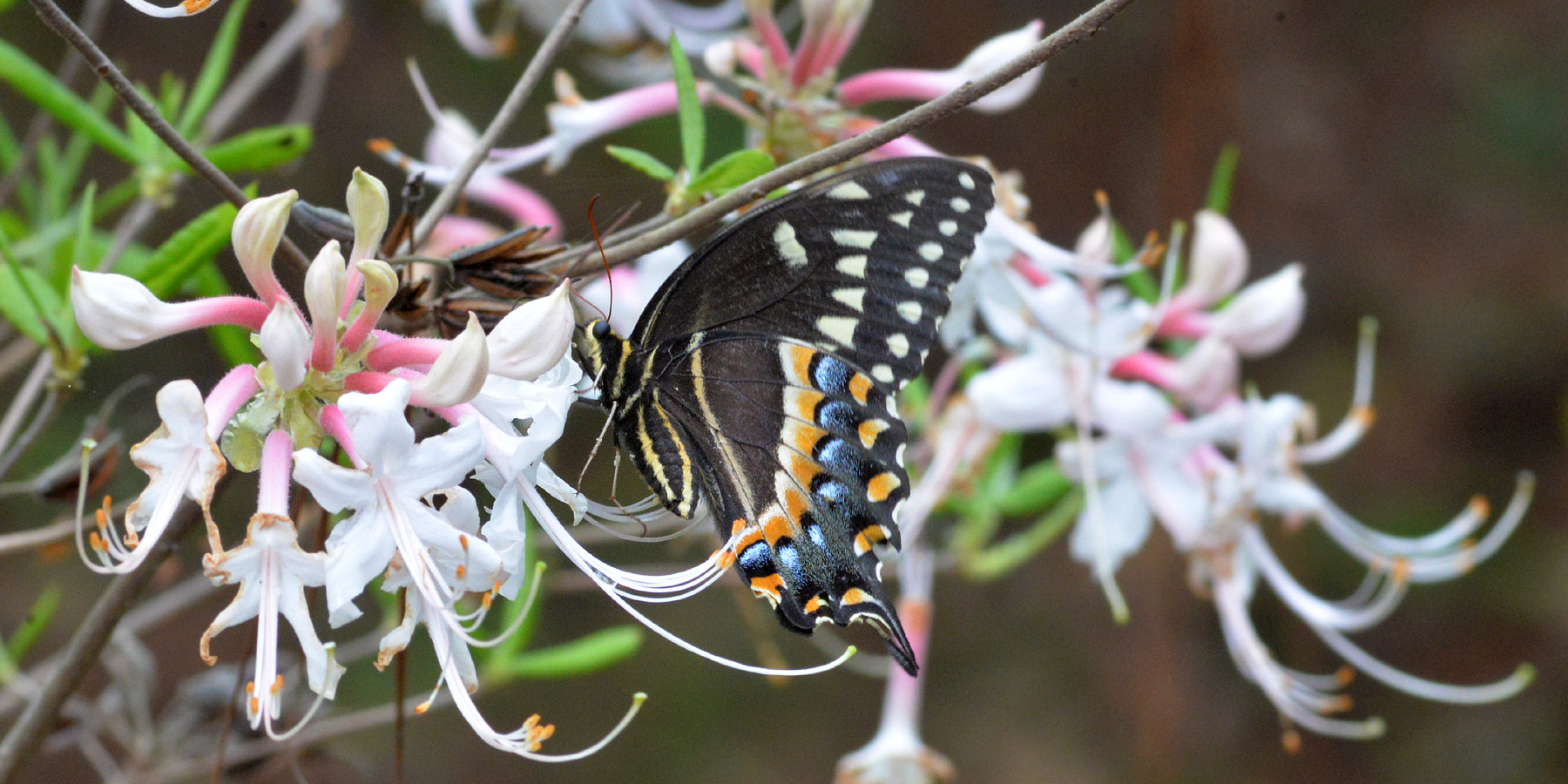
A Palamedes Swallowtail (Papilio palamedes) on a hoary azalea (Rhododendron canescens) Angelina NF.

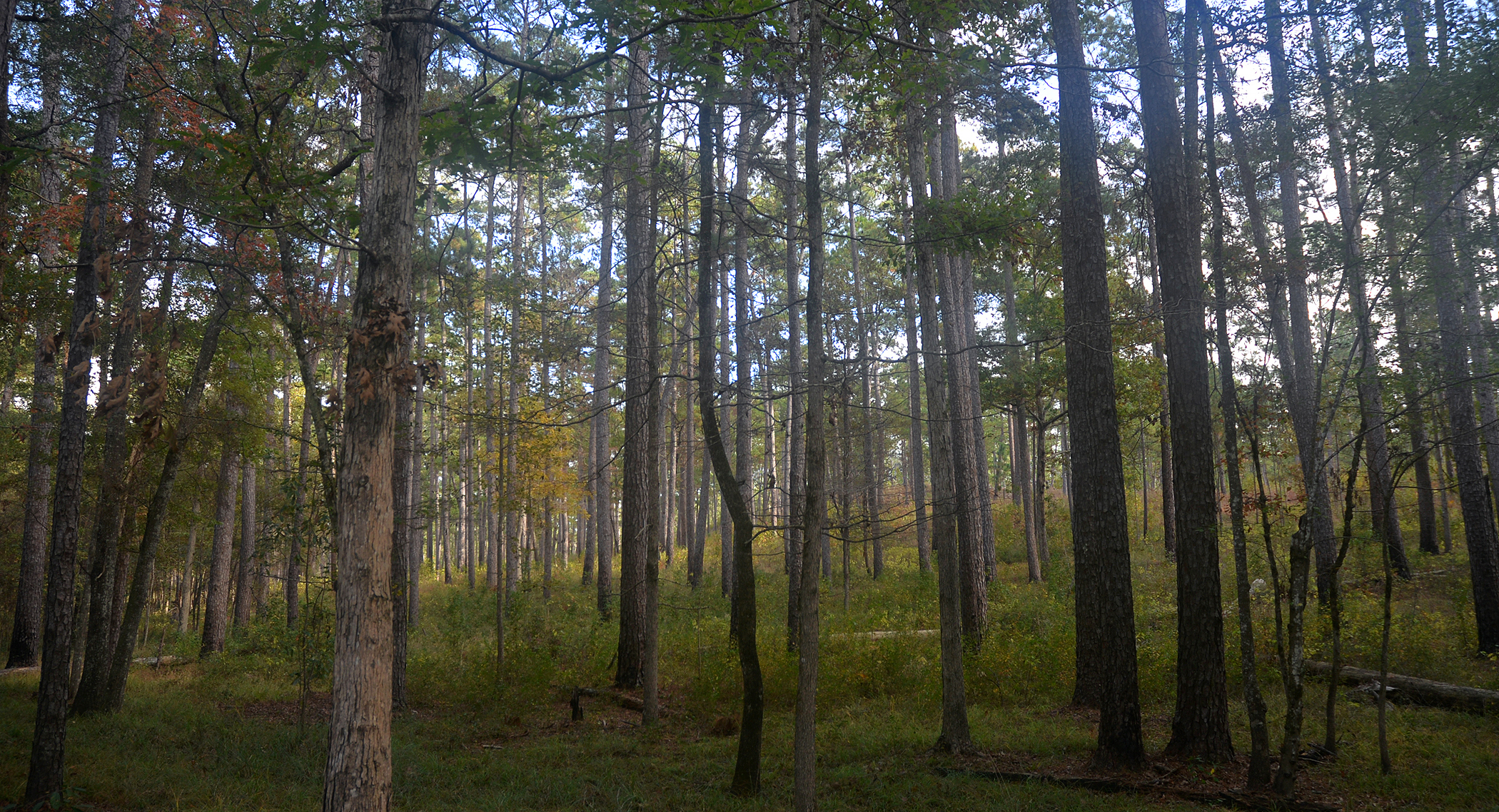
Angelina National Forest, Angelina County, Texas, USA (November 2020)

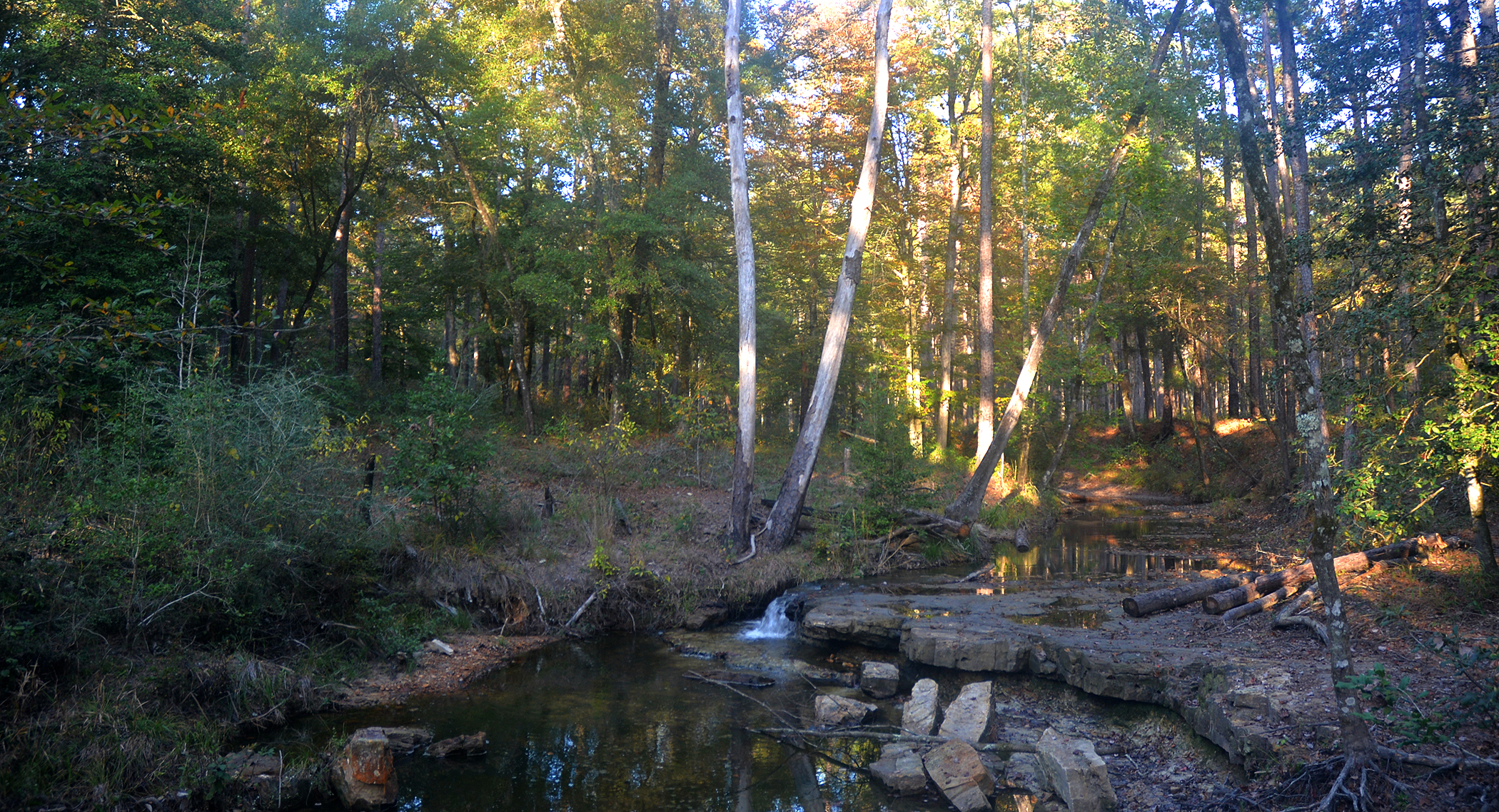
Boykin Creek, Angelina National Forest, Angelina County, Texas, USA (November 2020)

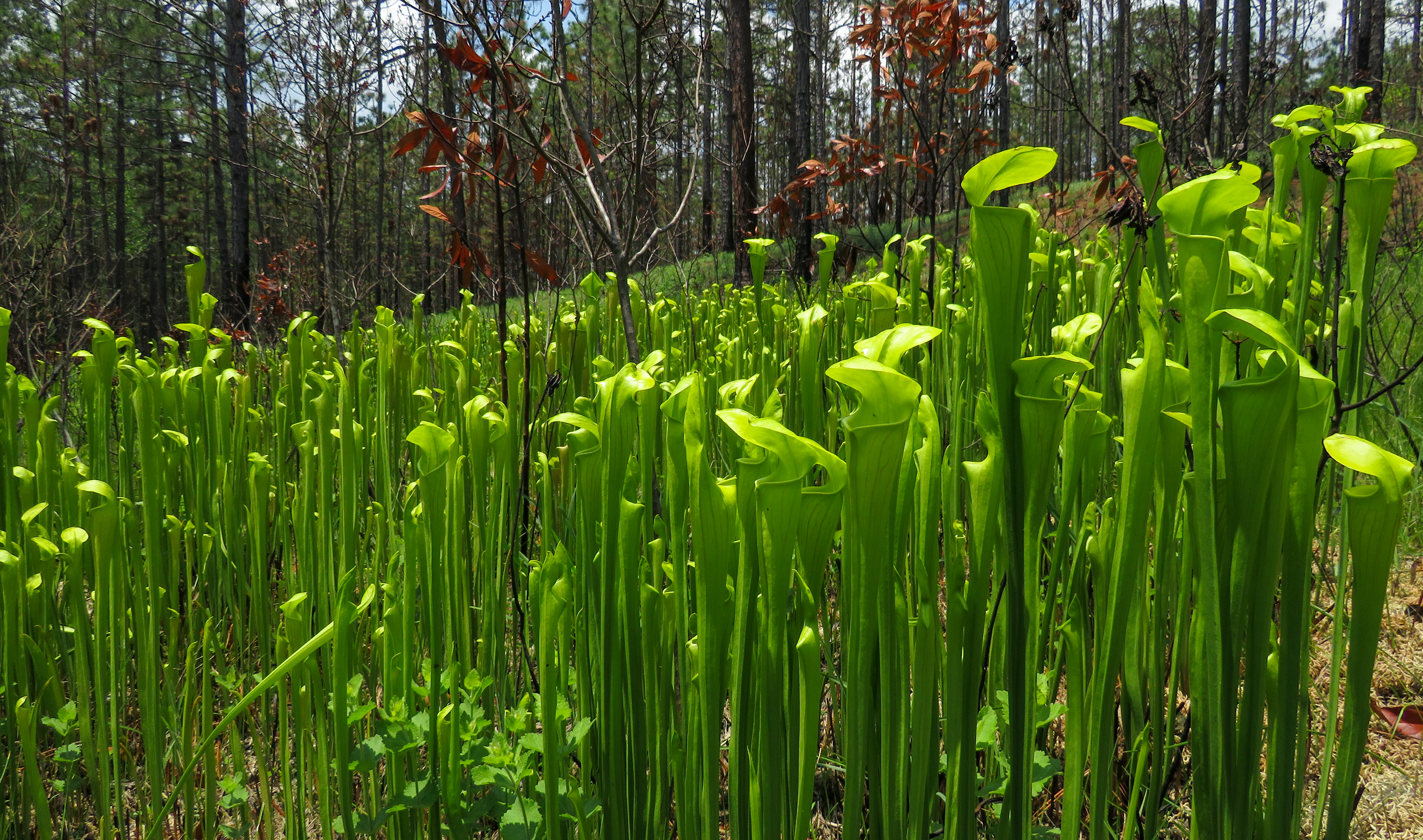
Newly emergent pitcher plants (Sarracenia alata) after a prescribed burn, Angelina NF.

== Wilderness areas ==
There are two officially designated wilderness areas lying within Angelina National Forest that are part of the National Wilderness Preservation System.

- Turkey Hill Wilderness
- Upland Island Wilderness

== See also ==
- Texas Forest Trail
- List of national forests of the United States
