= Brookeland Independent School District =

School district in Texas, United States

Address
- 187 Wildcat Walk Brookeland, Texas, 75931; United States

District information
- Type: Public
- Grades: PK–12
- Schools: 2
- NCES District ID: 4811520

Students and staff
- Students: 371 (2023–2024)
- Teachers: 38.50 (on an FTE basis) (2023–2024)
- Staff: 31.95 (on an FTE basis) (2023–2024)
- Student–teacher ratio: 9.64 (2023–2024)

Other information
- Website: www.brookelandisd.net

Brookeland Independent School District is a public school district based in the community of Brookeland, Texas (USA).

In addition to Brookeland, the district covers portions of four counties - southwestern Sabine, northeastern Jasper (including Browndell), northwestern Newton, and southeastern San Augustine.

In 2009, the school district was rated "academically acceptable" by the Texas Education Agency.

== Schools ==
- Brookeland High School (Grades 6–12)
- Brookeland Elementary School (Grades PK-5)
