= Gist, Texas =

Unincorporated community in Texas, US

Coordinates: 30°16′28″N 93°54′21″W

Gist is an unincorporated community in Jasper County, Texas, United States.

== History ==
A post office called Gist was established in 1912, and remained in operation until 1955. The community has the name of the local Gist family.
