= Texla, Texas =

Coordinates: 30°13′13″N 93°52′52″W

Texla is a ghost town in northern Orange County, Texas, United States, in the southeastern part of the state. It is located northwest of Orange, just west of Mauriceville. The site was originally called Bruce, after the postmaster Charles G. Bruce, who served when the office opened in 1905. The first sawmill to operate there was known as the Harrell-Votaw Lumber Company with proximity to the Orange and Northwestern Railway. The following year, the R. W. Wier Lumber Company out of Houston took over operations. The site (and the post office) was renamed Texla, due to its proximity to Louisiana. The owner Wier sold out to the Miller-Link Lumber Company in 1917. The peak population of the town reached an estimated 600 residents. In 1918 the mill was destroyed by fire, but was rebuilt in 1919 with a double-circular mill of the same size. Within a year, the Peavy-Moore Lumber Company of Deweyville took ownership, and operated the site until the nearby timber became exhausted. In 1929, the mill was dismantled and the site was abandoned.
From 1945 until 1977, a sawmill operated under the name Texla Lumber Company in nearby Mauriceville, according to the Texas Forestry Museum.

== See also ==
- Ghost town, and List of ghost towns
