= Beech Grove, Texas =

Unincorporated community in Texas, US

Coordinates: 30°51′22″N 94°07′17″W

Beech Grove, also known as Beach Grove, is an unincorporated community in Jasper County, Texas, United States. It is located on U.S. Highway 190, approximately six miles from Jasper. Its most recent population estimate is 75.

== History ==
A post office was established in 1890, so it can be presumed to have been founded in or before that year. By the late 1890s, a local school was established. By the 1910s, it had a store and a cotton gin. The school was moved to Highway 190 in 1937. The post office was moved to Curtis in 1944. It apparently was an incorporated town as late as 1986, as it had a town hall on that date. The school still existed at that same period of time.

== Education ==
Jasper Independent School District serves area students. Despite the small size of the town, Beech Grove still had a school as late as 1986.
