= Burkeville, Texas =

Unincorporated community in Texas, US

Coordinates: 31°0′0″N 93°40′5″W

Location of Burkeville
Burkeville, Texas (the United States)

Burkeville is an unincorporated community in northern Newton County, Texas, United States. It sits at the intersection of State Highways 63 and 87, 10 miles west of the Sabine River. The Burkeville Independent School District serves the resident students.

== Historical development ==
The town was named for John R. Burke, a well-educated and wealthy man from New York who took up residence there. He donated the land tract that would be used for the county courthouse. The plots for the town were laid out in 1844, and within three years the residents there petitioned to become the county seat. Over several years, the county seat would switch between Burkeville and Newton until the state legislature ordered that Newton should remain the permanent county seat in 1856. The town also served as an arsenal of the Confederacy during the Civil War. Agriculture and trade would keep the economy prospering until the lumber industry would add to the local market. In 1906, a catastrophic fire consumed all of the town's businesses excluding one.

== Recreation ==
The nearby Toledo Bend Reservoir is used for recreation by the locals as well as tourists and freshwater fishing enthusiasts.

Burkeville has a long-standing tradition of football excellence in the state of Texas. The Burkeville Mustangs won state in football in 1986 and 2001 in class 1A. Recently, due to diminishing numbers of students who attend, the football program has suffered tremendously and has been forced to switch from 11-man to 6-man. The team has not made it passed the first round of the playoffs in several years.

== Notable people ==
- Ernie Holmes- Former NFL defensive tackle for the Pittsburgh Steelers (1971-1977) and New England Patriots (1978) and 2x Super Bowl champion. He was part of the legendary Steel Curtain Pittsburgh Steelers' defense along with fellow linemen Joe Greene, Dwight White, and L. C. Greenwood.
- Robert Hunt- NFL Offensive Lineman for the Carolina Panthers
