= Brookeland, Texas =

Unincorporated community in Texas, US

Coordinates: 31°09′10″N 93°59′37″W

Brookeland is an unincorporated community in southwestern Sabine and northwestern Jasper counties in the Deep East region of the U.S. state of Texas. It is located thirteen miles south of Bronson on U.S. Route 96. The community has a population of approximately 300. The ZIP Code for Brookeland is 75931.

The Brookeland Independent School District serves area students. West Sabine ISD serves some students in the area as well.
