= South Toledo Bend, Texas =

- CDP
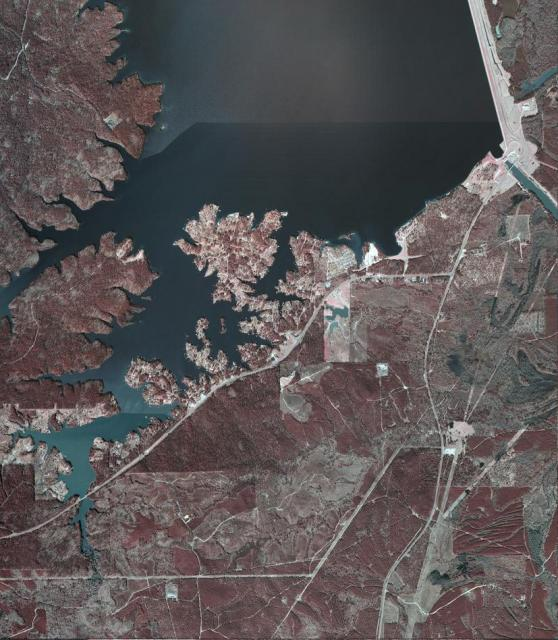
- Satellite view of South Toledo Bend

- Location within the state of Texas
- Coordinates: 31°09′12″N 93°37′12″W
- Country: United States
- State: Texas
- County: Newton

Area
  - Total: 5.7 sq mi (14.8 km^{2})
  - Land: 3.2 sq mi (8.3 km^{2})
  - Water: 2.5 sq mi (6.5 km^{2})
- Elevation: 171 ft (52 m)

Population (2020)
  - Total: 434
  - Density: 140/sq mi (52/km^{2})
- Time zone: UTC-6 (Central (CST))
  - Summer (DST): UTC-5 (CDT)
- Zip Code: 75932
- Area code: 409
- FIPS code: 48-69326
- GNIS feature ID: 2408775

South Toledo Bend is a census-designated place (CDP) in Newton County, Texas, United States. The population was 434 at the 2020 census, down from 524 at the 2010 census.

== Geography ==
According to the United States Census Bureau in 2000, the CDP has a total area of 21.2 square miles (55 km^{2}), of which 18.5 square miles (48 km^{2}) was land and 2.7 square miles (7.0 km^{2}) (12.85%) was water.

The CDP lost area prior to the 2010 census. The new total area is 5.7 square miles (15 km^{2}), of which 3.2 square miles (8.3 km^{2}) is now land and 2.5 square miles (6.5 km^{2}) is water.

== Demographics ==
Historical population
Census	Pop.	Note	%±
2000	576		—
2010	524		−9.0%
2020	434		−17.2%
U.S. Decennial Census; 1850–1900 1910; 1920 1930 1940; 1950 1960 1970; 1980 1990 2000; 2010

South Toledo Bend first appeared as a census designated place in the 2000 U.S. census.

=== 2020 census ===
South Toledo Bend CDP, Texas – Racial and ethnic composition Note: the US Census treats Hispanic/Latino as an ethnic category. This table excludes Latinos from the racial categories and assigns them to a separate category. Hispanics/Latinos may be of any race.
Race / Ethnicity (NH = Non-Hispanic)	Pop 2000	Pop 2010	Pop 2020	% 2000	% 2010	% 2020
White alone (NH)	553	503	399	96.01%	95.99%	91.94%
Black or African American alone (NH)	13	3	6	2.26%	0.57%	1.38%
Native American or Alaska Native alone (NH)	2	1	2	0.35%	0.19%	0.46%
Asian alone (NH)	1	3	4	0.17%	0.57%	0.92%
Native Hawaiian or Pacific Islander alone (NH)	0	0	0	0.00%	0.00%	0.00%
Other race alone (NH)	0	0	0	0.00%	0.00%	0.00%
Mixed race or Multiracial (NH)	3	3	11	0.52%	0.57%	2.53%
Hispanic or Latino (any race)	4	11	12	0.69%	2.10%	2.76%
Total	576	524	434	100.00%	100.00%	100.00%

As of the 2020 United States census, there were 434 people, 187 households, and 159 families residing in the CDP.

As of the census of 2000, there were 576 people, 289 households, and 199 families residing in the CDP. The population density was 31.2 inhabitants per square mile (12.0/km^{2}). There were 723 housing units at an average density of 39.2 per square mile (15.1/km^{2}). The racial makeup of the CDP was 96.70% White, 2.26% African American, 0.35% Native American, 0.17% Asian, and 0.52% from two or more races. Hispanic or Latino of any race were 0.69% of the population.

There were 289 households, out of which 10.0% had children under the age of 18 living with them, 64.0% were married couples living together, 2.1% had a female householder with no husband present, and 30.8% were non-families. 27.7% of all households were made up of individuals, and 14.2% had someone living alone who was 65 years of age or older. The average household size was 1.99 and the average family size was 2.37.

In the CDP, the population was spread out, with 10.2% under the age of 18, 3.1% from 18 to 24, 15.1% from 25 to 44, 37.2% from 45 to 64, and 34.4% who were 65 years of age or older. The median age was 58 years. For every 100 females, there were 100.0 males. For every 100 females age 18 and over, there were 102.7 males.

The median income for a household in the CDP was $37,697, and the median income for a family was $42,212. Males had a median income of $33,646 versus $14,375 for females. The per capita income for the CDP was $20,238. About 4.1% of families and 9.4% of the population were below the poverty line, including 8.1% of those under age 18 and 7.0% of those age 65 or over.
