= Angelina River =

River in Texas, United States

Angelina River Shawnee Creek
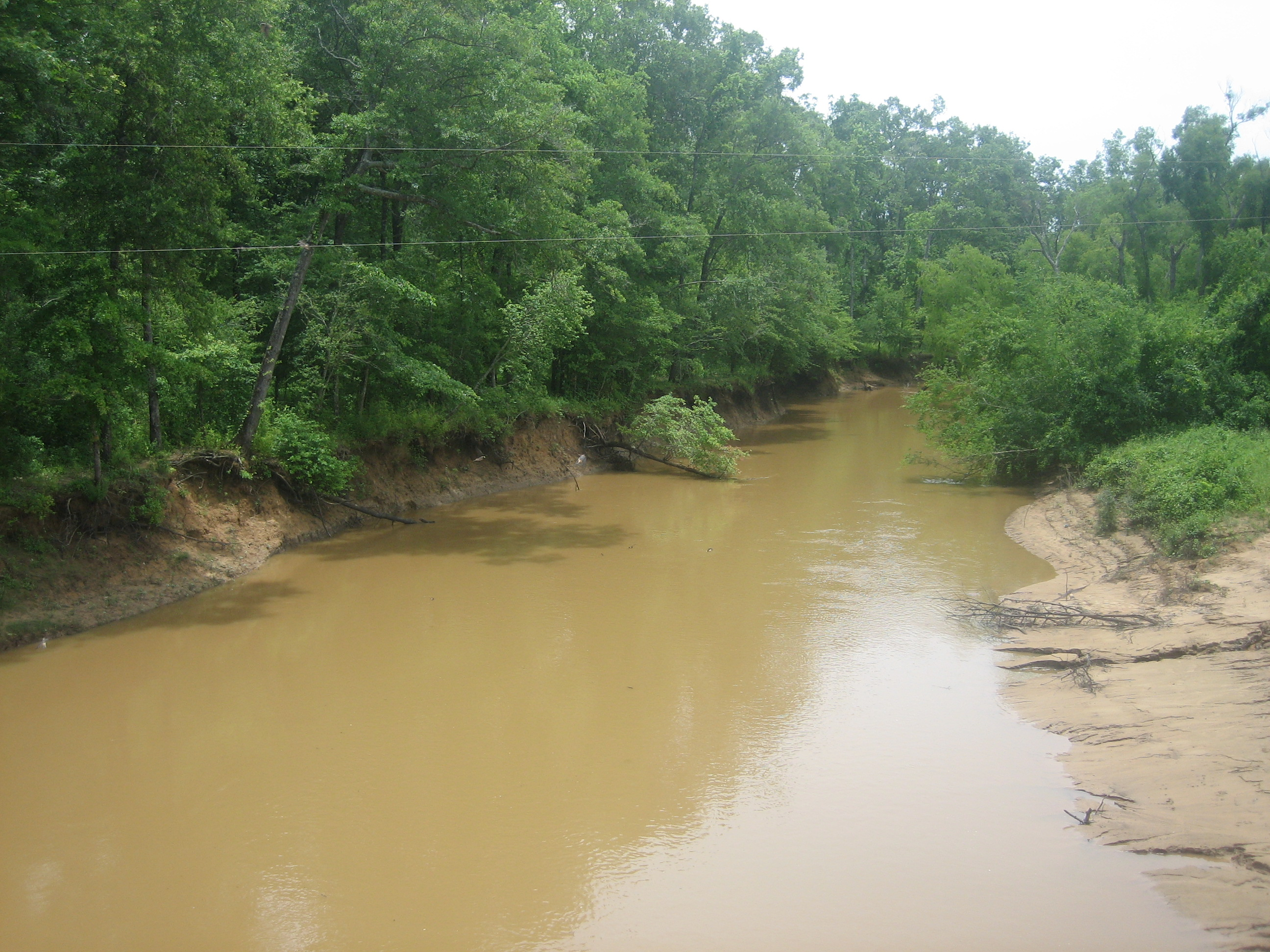
- The muddy Angelina River on Texas State Highway 21 west of Nacogdoches
- Native name: Río Angelina (Spanish)

Location
- Country: United States
- State: Texas

Physical characteristics
- Source: Berryhill Creek
  - coordinates: 32°01′25″N 94°49′35″W
- Mouth: Neches River
  - location: Pace Hill, Texas, United States
  - coordinates: 30°53′41″N 94°11′52″W
- Length: 120 mi (190 km)

The Angelina River is formed by the confluence of Barnhardt and Shawnee creeks 3 miles (5 km) northwest of Laneville in southwest central Rusk County, Texas, United States.

A tributary of the Neches River, the river flows southeast for 120 miles (193 km) and forms the boundaries between Cherokee and Nacogdoches, Angelina and Nacogdoches, and Angelina and San Augustine counties. It passes under US 59 via former Angelina River Bridge. It empties into the Neches River 12 miles (19 km) north of Jasper in northwestern Jasper County.

The Sam Rayburn Reservoir is on the southern part of the river.

== History ==
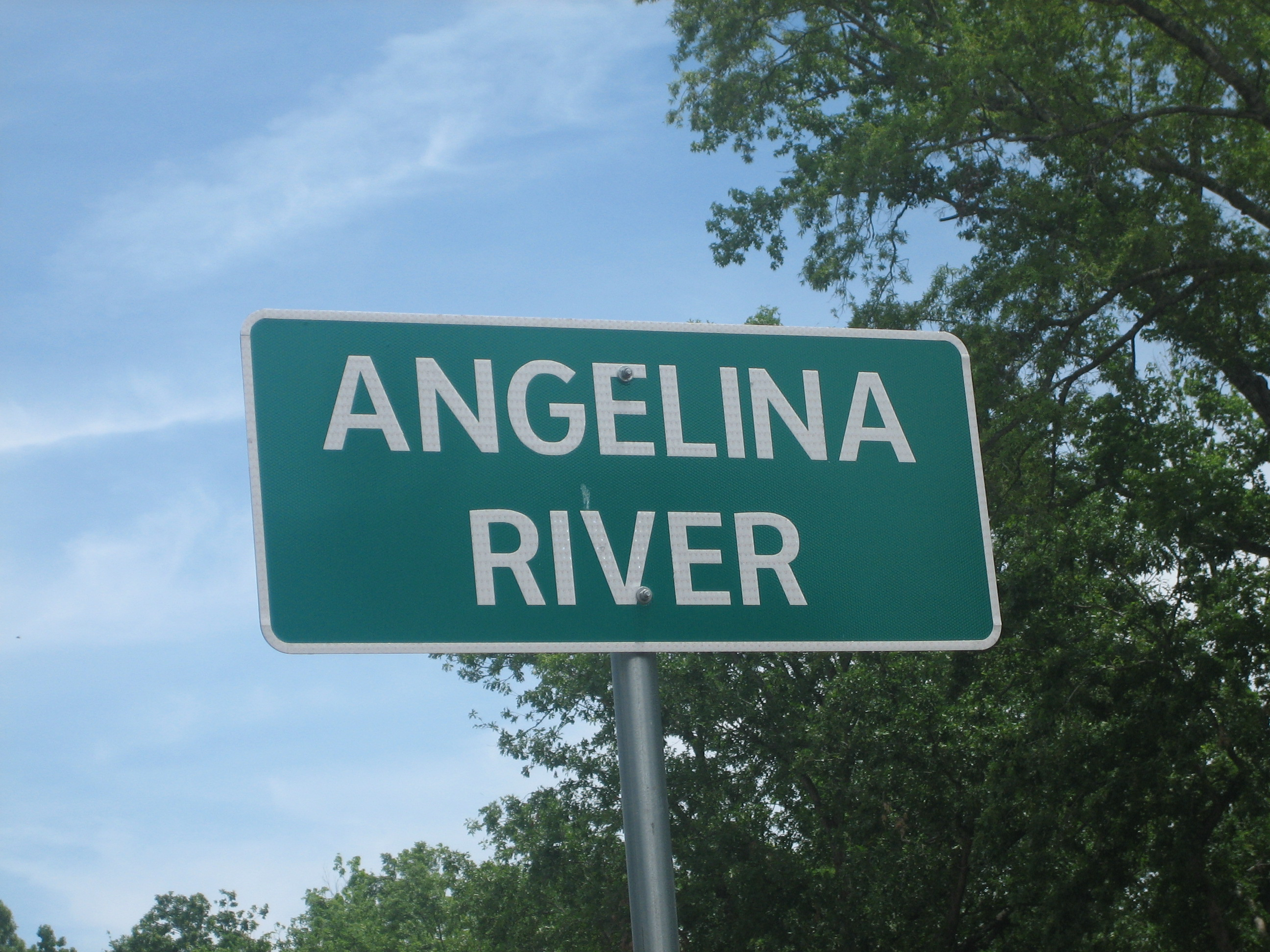
Angelina River Sign

The river was named for a native Hasinai girl whom Spanish missionaries called Angelina. It was well known to Spanish and French explorers and to missionaries in East Texas. Spanish land grants along the stream date back to the later eighteenth century, and there was considerable settlement in the area during the Mexican period.

In 1832, the Battle of Nacogdoches spilled over onto the Angelina, when James Bowie ambushed the fleeing Mexican army at this river.

River traffic on the Angelina began to die in the 1880s with the arrival of the railroads. By 1900, the stream was no longer navigable. Farming and clear-cutting by the growing lumber industry in the river's watershed caused the river to silt up, and numerous sandbars formed along its course.

== See also ==
- List of rivers of Texas
- Angelina College
