= Jasper Independent School District =

School district in Texas, United States

Address
- 128 Park Street Jasper, Texas, 75951; United States

District information
- Type: Public
- Grades: PK–12
- Schools: 4
- NCES District ID: 4824630

Students and staff
- Students: 2,194 (2023–2024)
- Teachers: 161.68 (on an FTE basis) (2023–2024)
- Staff: 218.74 (on an FTE basis) (2023–2024)
- Student–teacher ratio: 13.57 (2023–2024)

Other information
- Website: www.jasperisd.net

Jasper Independent School District is a public school district based in Jasper, Texas. Jasper ISD serves the city of Jasper.

== History ==
In 1948 the district absorbed an area formerly in the Vernon County Line Common School District which had only white students.

In 2009, the school district was rated "recognized" by the Texas Education Agency.

Effective the 2022–2023 school year the district will hold classes four days per week instead of five.

== Schools ==
Secondary schools

- Jasper High School (grades 9–12)
- Jasper Junior High School (grades 6–8)

Primary schools

- Parnell Elementary School (grades 4–5)
- Jean C. Few Primary School (prekindergarten through grade 3)

Former schools

- Rowe High School (A segregated all-African-American school)
