= Sam Rayburn Reservoir =

Reservoir in southeast Texas, U.S.

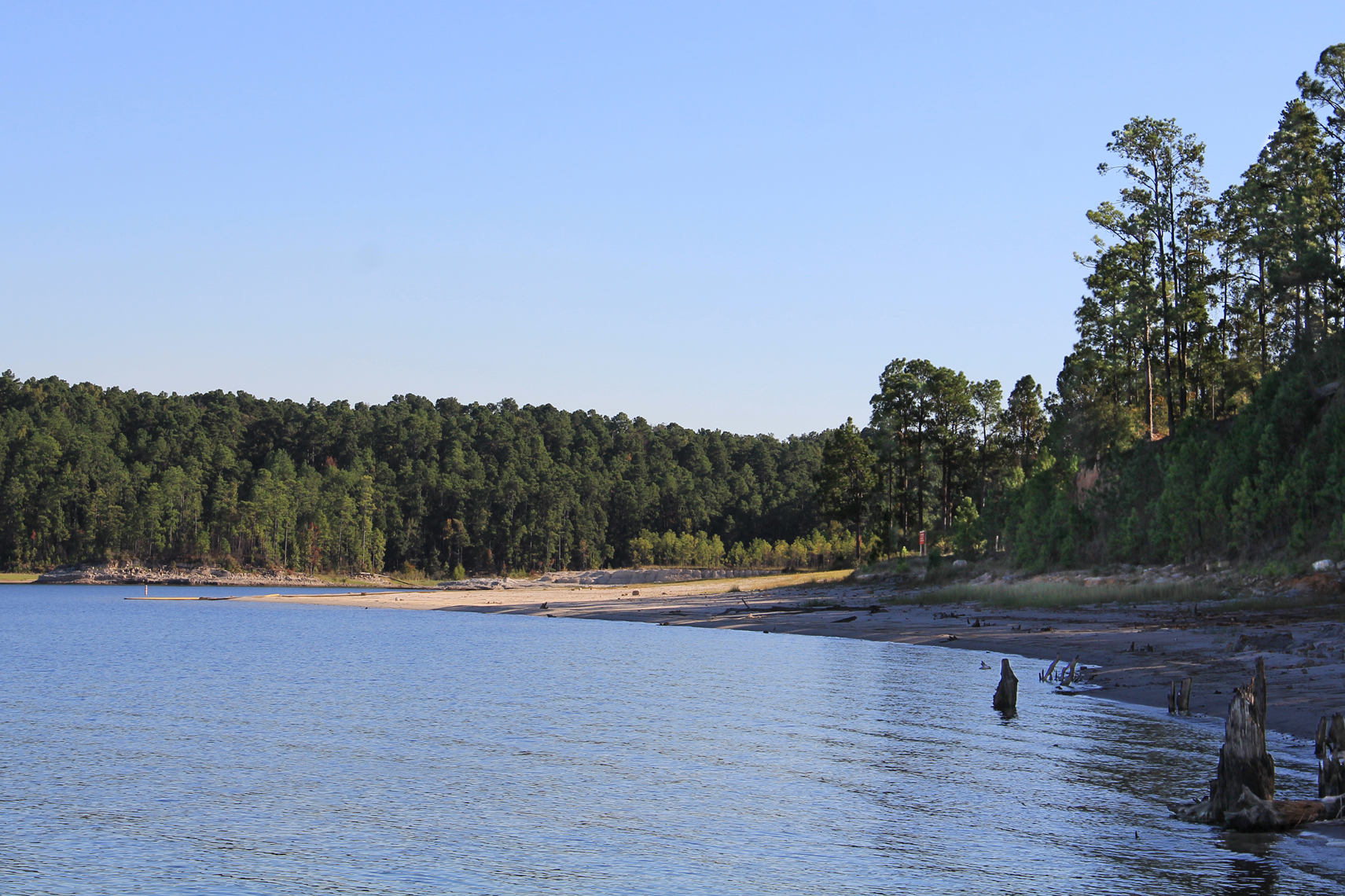

- Location within Texas Location within the United States
- Location: Angelina/ Nacogdoches/ San Augustine / Jasper / Sabine counties, Southeast Texas
- Coordinates: 31°03′40″N 94°06′22″W
- Type: reservoir
- Primary inflows: Angelina River
- Primary outflows: Angelina River
- Catchment area: 3,449 sq mi (8,930 km^{2})
- Basin countries: United States
- Max. length: 36.43 miles (58.63 km)
- Max. width: 4.29 miles (6.90 km)
- Surface area: 114,500 acres (463 km^{2})
- Max. depth: 90 feet (27 m)
- Water volume: 1,140,500 acre⋅ft (1.4068 km^{3})
- Surface elevation: 164 ft (50 m)
- Islands: numerous islands and islets

Sam Rayburn Reservoir is a reservoir in the United States in Deep East Texas, 70 miles (110 km) north of Beaumont. The reservoir is fed by the Angelina River, the major tributary of the Neches River. The Reservoir is upstream of the Big Thicket National Preserve.

The reservoir's capacity is 3,997,600 acre-feet (4.9310×10^{9} m^{3}), and is the largest lake wholly within the state of Texas. It is the ninth largest reservoir in the United States. Sam Rayburn Reservoir is operated by the United States Army Corps of Engineers, Fort Worth district.

== History ==
Construction began September 7, 1956, and the reservoir began serving its purpose on March 29, 1965. The main purposes of the reservoir are flood control, hydroelectric power generation, and conservation of water. Construction costs, including those for recreation facilities, were estimated at $66 million.

It was known as McGee Bend Dam and Reservoir until 1963. In September of that year, the 88th Congress adopted a special resolution changing the name to "Sam Rayburn Dam and Reservoir" in honor of the recently deceased Speaker of the House Sam Rayburn, a long-time champion of soil and water conservation. Dedication ceremonies were held on May 8, 1965.

In accordance with the 1945 federal Rivers and Harbors Act, four reservoirs were originally approved for the Neches and Angelina Rivers Basin. They were designated as Dam A, Dam B, Rockland, and McGee Bend. The first to be built was Dam B, completed on the Neches River in 1953. The name was changed to Town Bluff Dam and B. A. Steinhagen Reservoir, but locals still refer to it as Dam B. In 1955, Congress approved the funding for McGee Bend Dam and Reservoir, and construction began in 1957. Congress changed the name to Sam Rayburn Dam and Reservoir in 1963, and it was formally dedicated in 1965. The Dam A and Rockland dams, which were to be on the Neches River upstream from the convergence of the Neches and Angelina Rivers, were deemed to be unnecessary and listed as "deferred".

Lake Sam Rayburn can be crossed on Texas State Highway 147 and is a popular recreation destination, both for boating and fishing, with game fish species in the lake including largemouth bass, bluegill, and channel catfish. Due to the abundance of bass, it is home to more than 300 tournaments annually, which include tournaments such as the Bassmaster Elite Series and Opens, BASS Champs, BFL, Major League Fishing, Toyota Series, the Cabela's Texas Team Trail, Angler's Quest, Bass-n-Bucks, and McDonald's Big Bass Splash. In 2018, Lake Sam Rayburn was ranked number one by Bassmaster magazine for being the best bass lake in the nation.

== Notable people ==
The science-fiction and fantasy writer Ardath Mayhar lived near Sam Rayburn Lake, on a homestead bordering the Attoyac River above the lake. She wrote her tales there and also at a local bookstore she ran.
