= Jasper County, Texas =

County in Texas, United States

- County
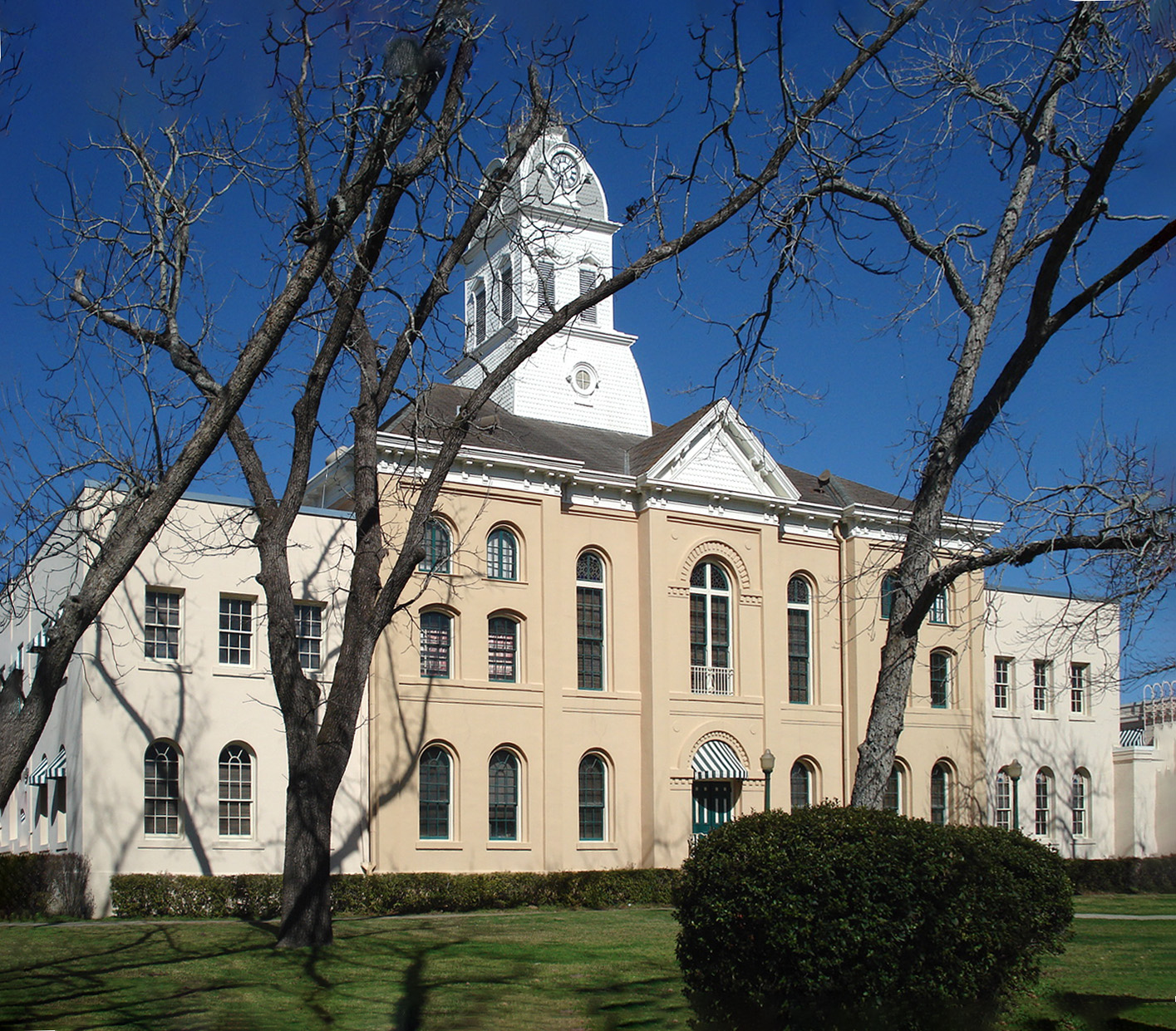
- Jasper County Courthouse

- Location within the U.S. state of Texas
- Coordinates: 30°44′N 94°02′W
- Country: United States
- State: Texas
- Founded: 1837
- Named for: William Jasper
- Seat: Jasper
- Largest city: Jasper

Area
  - Total: 970 sq mi (2,500 km^{2})
  - Land: 939 sq mi (2,430 km^{2})
  - Water: 31 sq mi (80 km^{2}) 3.2%

Population (2020)
  - Total: 32,980
  - Estimate (2025): 33,075 ▲
  - Density: 35.1/sq mi (13.6/km^{2})
- Time zone: UTC−6 (Central)
  - Summer (DST): UTC−5 (CDT)
- Congressional district: 36th
- Website: www.co.jasper.tx.us

Jasper County is a county located in the U.S. state of Texas. As of the 2020 census, its population was 32,980. Its county seat is Jasper. The county was created as a municipality in Mexico in 1834, and in 1837 was organized as a county in the Republic of Texas. It is named for William Jasper, an American Revolutionary War hero.

== Geography ==
According to the U.S. Census Bureau, the county has a total area of 970 square miles (2,500 km^{2}), of which 939 square miles (2,430 km^{2}) are land and 31 square miles (80 km^{2}) (3.2%) are covered by water.

=== Major highways ===
- U.S. Highway 69
- U.S. Highway 96
- U.S. Highway 190
- State Highway 62
- State Highway 63
- Loop 149
- Spur 68
- Recreational Road 255

=== Adjacent counties ===
- San Augustine County (north)
- Sabine County (northeast)
- Newton County (east)
- Orange County (south)
- Hardin County (southwest)
- Tyler County (west)
- Angelina County (northwest)

=== National protected areas ===
- Angelina National Forest (part)
- Big Thicket National Preserve (part)
- Sabine National Forest (part)

== Demographics ==
Historical population
Census	Pop.	Note	%±
1850	1,767		—
1860	4,037		128.5%
1870	4,218		4.5%
1880	5,779		37.0%
1890	5,592		−3.2%
1900	7,138		27.6%
1910	14,000		96.1%
1920	15,569		11.2%
1930	17,064		9.6%
1940	17,491		2.5%
1950	20,049		14.6%
1960	22,100		10.2%
1970	24,692		11.7%
1980	30,781		24.7%
1990	31,102		1.0%
2000	35,604		14.5%
2010	35,710		0.3%
2020	32,980		−7.6%
2025 (est.)	33,075	▲	0.3%
U.S. Decennial Census; 1850–2010 2010–2020

=== 2020 census ===
As of the 2020 census, the county had a population of 32,980. The median age was 43.7 years. 22.6% of residents were under the age of 18 and 21.4% of residents were 65 years of age or older. For every 100 females there were 97.1 males, and for every 100 females age 18 and over there were 95.2 males age 18 and over.

The racial makeup of the county was 73.8% White, 17.0% Black or African American, 0.6% American Indian and Alaska Native, 0.4% Asian, 0.1% Native Hawaiian and Pacific Islander, 3.5% from some other race, and 4.8% from two or more races. Hispanic or Latino residents of any race comprised 6.7% of the population.

22.1% of residents lived in urban areas, while 77.9% lived in rural areas.

There were 13,050 households in the county, of which 29.3% had children under the age of 18 living in them. Of all households, 49.7% were married-couple households, 18.1% were households with a male householder and no spouse or partner present, and 28.0% were households with a female householder and no spouse or partner present. About 27.7% of all households were made up of individuals and 13.5% had someone living alone who was 65 years of age or older.

There were 16,172 housing units, of which 19.3% were vacant. Among occupied housing units, 78.4% were owner-occupied and 21.6% were renter-occupied. The homeowner vacancy rate was 2.0% and the rental vacancy rate was 12.5%.

=== Racial and ethnic composition ===
Jasper County, Texas – Racial and ethnic composition Note: the US Census treats Hispanic/Latino as an ethnic category. This table excludes Latinos from the racial categories and assigns them to a separate category. Hispanics/Latinos may be of any race.
Race / Ethnicity (NH = Non-Hispanic)	Pop 1980	Pop 1990	Pop 2000	Pop 2010	Pop 2020	% 1980	% 1990	% 2000	% 2010	% 2020
White alone (NH)	24,424	24,529	27,320	26,939	23,795	79.35%	78.87%	76.73%	75.44%	72.15%
Black or African American alone (NH)	5,904	5,852	6,302	5,931	5,572	19.18%	18.82%	17.70%	16.61%	16.90%
Native American or Alaska Native alone (NH)	30	74	125	168	127	0.10%	0.24%	0.35%	0.47%	0.39%
Asian alone (NH)	22	36	111	200	114	0.07%	0.12%	0.31%	0.56%	0.35%
Native Hawaiian or Pacific Islander alone (NH)	x	x	5	12	16	x	x	0.01%	0.03%	0.05%
Other race alone (NH)	19	17	10	21	72	0.06%	0.05%	0.03%	0.06%	0.22%
Mixed race or Multiracial (NH)	x	x	347	422	1,086	x	x	0.97%	1.18%	3.29%
Hispanic or Latino (any race)	382	594	1,384	2,017	2,198	1.24%	1.91%	3.89%	5.65%	6.66%
Total	30,781	31,102	35,604	35,710	32,980	100.00%	100.00%	100.00%	100.00%	100.00%

=== 2000 census ===
As of the 2000 census, 35,604 people, 13,450 households, and 9,966 families resided in the county. The population density was 38 people per square mile (15 people/km^{2}). The 16,576 housing units averaged 18 units per square mile (6.9/km^{2}). The racial makeup of the county was 78.24% White, 17.81% Black or African American, 0.42% Native American, 0.32% Asian, 0.03% Pacific Islander, 2.04% from other races, and 1.15% from two or more races. About 3.89% of the population was Hispanic or Latino of any race.

Of the 13,450 households, 33.40% had children under the age of 18 living with them, 58.20% were married couples living together, 12.50% had a female householder with no husband present, and 25.90% were not families. About 23% of all households were made up of individuals, and 11.2% had someone living alone who was 65 years of age or older. The average household size was 2.58 and the average family size was 3.03.

In the county, the population was distributed as 26.50% under the age of 18, 8.00% from 18 to 24, 26.80% from 25 to 44, 23.40% from 45 to 64, and 15.30% who were 65 years of age or older. The median age was 37 years. For every 100 females, there were 94.60 males. For every 100 females age 18 and over, there were 92.10 males.

The median income for a household in the county was $30,902, and for a family was $35,709. Males had a median income of $31,739 versus $19,119 for females. The per capita income for the county was $15,636. About 15.00% of families and 18.10% of the population were below the poverty line, including 23.40% of those under age 18 and 17.80% of those age 65 or over.

== Government ==
=== United States Congress ===
Senators	Name	Party	First Elected	Level
Senate Class 1	John Cornyn	Republican	2002	Senior Senator
Senate Class 2	Ted Cruz	Republican	2012	Junior Senator
Representatives	Name	Party	First Elected	Area(s) of Jasper County Represented
District 36	Brian Babin	Republican	New district created with 2010 census. First elected 2014.	Entire county

United States presidential election results for Jasper County, Texas
Year	Republican		Democratic		Third party(ies)	
Year	No.	%	No.	%	No.	%
1912	40	4.33%	628	67.97%	256	27.71%
1916	75	7.31%	906	88.30%	45	4.39%
1920	62	5.66%	793	72.42%	240	21.92%
1924	176	10.24%	1,526	88.77%	17	0.99%
1928	611	40.44%	898	59.43%	2	0.13%
1932	93	4.46%	1,990	95.49%	1	0.05%
1936	109	6.76%	1,500	93.05%	3	0.19%
1940	220	8.96%	2,236	91.04%	0	0.00%
1944	341	14.05%	1,850	76.23%	236	9.72%
1948	284	11.24%	1,777	70.32%	466	18.44%
1952	1,946	42.84%	2,595	57.12%	2	0.04%
1956	2,430	56.41%	1,856	43.08%	22	0.51%
1960	2,102	41.03%	3,004	58.64%	17	0.33%
1964	1,919	34.66%	3,600	65.02%	18	0.33%
1968	1,839	25.60%	2,438	33.94%	2,906	40.46%
1972	4,575	62.46%	2,746	37.49%	4	0.05%
1976	3,167	36.80%	5,422	63.00%	18	0.21%
1980	4,396	42.86%	5,707	55.64%	154	1.50%
1984	5,965	50.64%	5,787	49.13%	27	0.23%
1988	4,985	42.87%	6,613	56.87%	31	0.27%
1992	3,870	32.02%	5,658	46.81%	2,559	21.17%
1996	4,523	42.51%	5,039	47.36%	1,078	10.13%
2000	7,071	60.22%	4,533	38.61%	138	1.18%
2004	8,347	64.84%	4,471	34.73%	55	0.43%
2008	9,022	70.62%	3,658	28.63%	96	0.75%
2012	9,957	73.66%	3,423	25.32%	137	1.01%
2016	10,609	79.06%	2,590	19.30%	220	1.64%
2020	12,542	80.26%	2,954	18.90%	131	0.84%
2024	13,162	83.09%	2,615	16.51%	64	0.40%

United States Senate election results for Jasper County, Texas1
Year	Republican		Democratic		Third party(ies)	
Year	No.	%	No.	%	No.	%
2024	12,842	81.56%	2,702	17.16%	201	1.28%

United States Senate election results for Jasper County, Texas2
Year	Republican		Democratic		Third party(ies)	
Year	No.	%	No.	%	No.	%
2020	12,312	80.01%	2,851	18.53%	226	1.47%

Texas Gubernatorial election results for Jasper County
Year	Republican		Democratic		Third party(ies)	
Year	No.	%	No.	%	No.	%
2022	9,701	85.25%	1,601	14.07%	77	0.68%

=== County officials ===
- County Judge - Judge Mark W. Allen
- Commissioner, Pct. #1 - Seth Martindale
- Commissioner, Pct. #2 - Roy Parker
- Commissioner, Pct. #3 - Willie Stark
- Commissioner, Pct. #4 - Vance Moss
- County Sheriff - Chuck Havard
- Tax Assessor/Collector - Bobby Biscamp
- County Clerk - Debbie Newman
- County Treasurer - René Ellis
- County Auditor - Mellissa Smith
- Tax Appraiser - Lori Barnett
- District Attorney - Ann Pickle
- Emergency Management Coordinator - Billy Ted Smith

The County jail is named after former Sheriff, Aubrey E. Cole.

=== District officials ===
- District Judge - Judicial District 1 - Judge Craig M. Mixson (appointed by Texas Governor Rick Perry to complete term of Judge Gary Gatlin, who resigned effective December 31, 2011)
- District Judge - Judicial District 1A - DeLinda Gibbs-Walker
- District Clerk - Rosa Norsworthy
- District Attorney - Anne Pickle

=== Courts ===
- Justice of the Peace, Pct. #1 - John Cooper
- Justice of the Peace, Pct. #2 - Raymond Hopson
- Justice of the Peace, Pct. #3 - Mike Smith
- Justice of the Peace, Pct. #4 - Gina Cleveland
- Justice of the Peace, Pct. #5 - Brett Holloway
- Justice of the Peace, Pct. #6 - Steve Conner
- Constable, Pct. #1 - Jimmy Hensarling
- Constable, Pct. #2 - Niles Nichols
- Constable, Pct. #3 - Ronnie Hutchison
- Constable, Pct. #4 - Gene Hawthorne
- Constable, Pct. #5 - Michael Poindexter
- Constable, Pct. #6 - Chad Ainsworth

== Communities ==
=== Cities ===
- Browndell
- Jasper (county seat)
- Kirbyville

=== Census-designated places ===
- Buna
- Evadale
- Sam Rayburn

=== Unincorporated communities ===
- Beans
- Beech Grove
- Bessmay
- Brookeland (partly in Sabine County)
- Erin
- Gist

=== Ghost towns ===
- Zeirath

== Education ==
School districts:

- Brookeland Independent School District
- Buna Independent School District
- Colmesneil Independent School District
- Evadale Independent School District
- Jasper Independent School District
- Kirbyville Consolidated Independent School District
- Vidor Independent School District

Areas of Jasper County in Brookeland ISD, Colmesneil ISD, and Jasper ISD are assigned to Angelina College. Legislation does not specify a community college for the remainder of the county.

== See also ==
- National Register of Historic Places listings in Jasper County, Texas
- Recorded Texas Historic Landmarks in Jasper County
