= Texas State Highway 87 =

State highway in Texas

State Highway 87
- SH 87 highlighted in red

Route information
- Maintained by TxDOT
- Length: 249.39 mi (401.35 km)
- Existed: 1923–present

Major junctions
- South end: I-45 / Spur 342 in Galveston
- US 69 / US 96 / US 287 in Port Arthur; I-10 / US 90 in Orange; US 190 in Newton; US 96 in Center
- North end: Future I-69 / US 59 / US 84 at Timpson

Location
- Country: United States
- State: Texas

Highway system
- Highways in Texas; Interstate; US; State; Former; Toll; Loops; Spurs; FM/RM; Park; Rec
| ← US 87 | → SH 88 |

State Highway 87 (SH 87) runs for 249.4 miles (401.4 km) between Galveston, Texas (at a terminus shared with Interstate 45 and Spur 342) to U.S. Highway 59 and U.S. Highway 84 in Timpson, Texas.

Highway 87 has a notable stretch between Sea Rim State Park and High Island, Texas that has been washed out repeatedly over the decades and has been closed continuously since 1990. Portions of this stretch were less than 100 feet (30 m) away from high tide in the 1990s. The storm surge from Hurricane Jerry which made landfall on October 15, 1989, left the highway in a state of disrepair.

In 2018, a repair project was started by the Texas Department of Transportation to raise the elevation of the segment from Rollover Pass to High Island by 2.5 feet, with the goal of keeping the roadway passable during high tides. The project has an estimated cost of $20.8 million. There is also a separate project, begun in 2022, to rehabilitate the dunes on Bolivar Peninsula to mitigate the erosion caused by the tides.

A section of highway which is now known as the Warden Michael C. Pauling Memorial Highway stretches from the Intracoastal Waterway Bridge to Sabine Pass on Texas 87.

== History ==
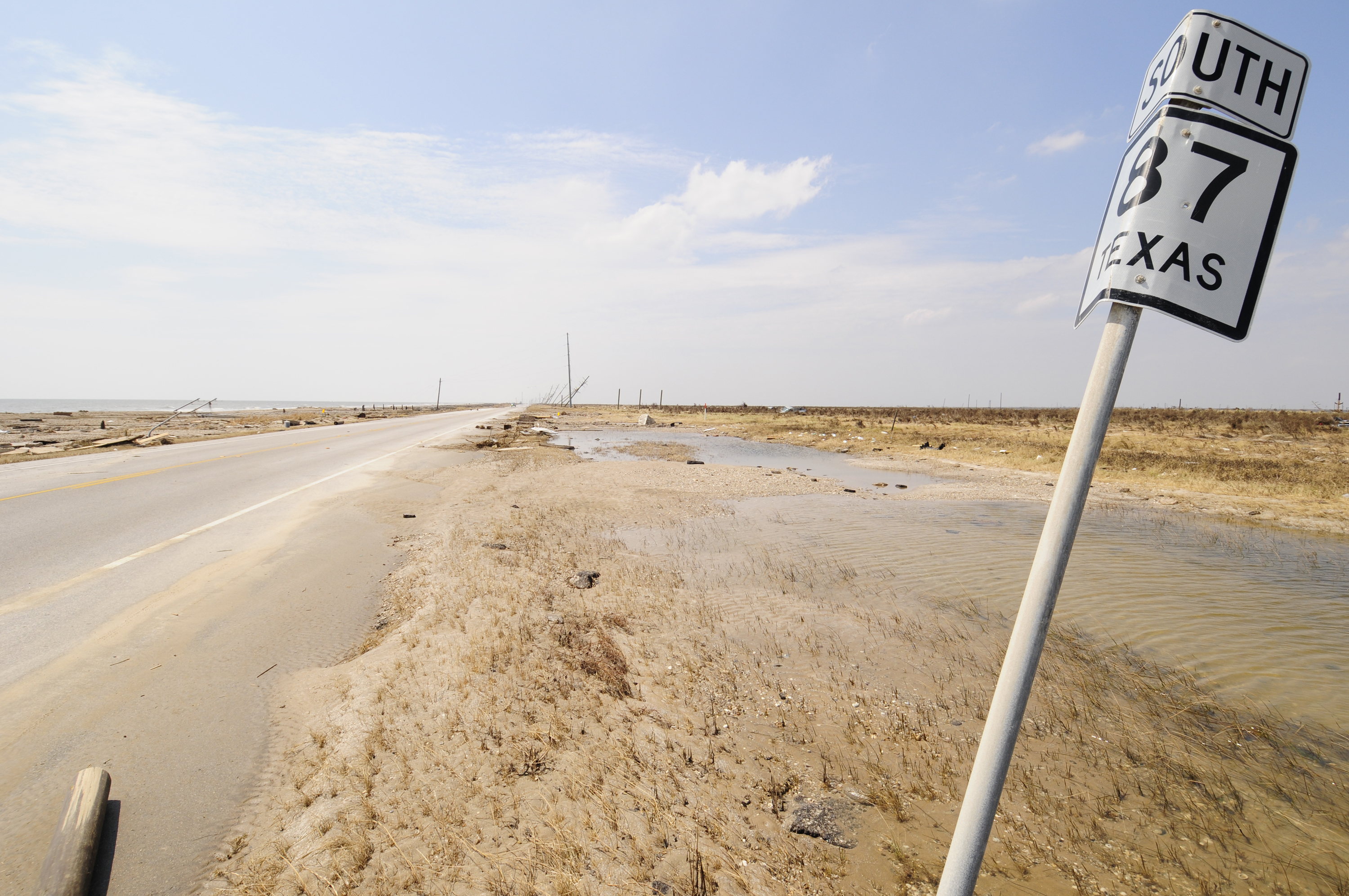
SH 87 approaching Gilchrist with damage from Hurricane Ike

SH 87 was originally designated on August 21, 1923 from Orange to Milam. The route was the previously proposed to be SH 8A before being renumbered. On September 16, 1926, SH 87 was extended to Port Arthur, though this was not taken over for maintenance until January 1, 1927. An extension via High Island to Galveston was planned to be taken over when TxDOT could afford it. On March 19, 1930, the north end was shortened to Hemphill. On August 1, 1930, SH 87 extended back to Milam, replacing SH 21 Spur. On May 5, 1931, it was extended again, this time to High Island. On November 22, 1933, SH 87 extended to Carter's Store. On March 17, 1936, SH 87 replaced the section of SH 124 from High Island to Galveston. On December 22, 1936, SH 87 was extended to its current terminus in Timpson. On May 23, 1939, SH 87 Spur was designated to Wiergate. On September 26, 1939, The spurs were changed to Spur 24 (Wiergate) and Spur 69 (Deweyville). On August 20, 1952, SH 87 was no longer concurrent with US 96 from Center to Carter's Store. In 1970, road machinery used in its construction accidentally dug up several cannonballs and crumbling kegs of black powder about 10 miles west of Sabine Pass. Further excavation eventually produced more kegs of black powder and several hundred cannonballs. The ammunition had been buried there by Confederate soldiers in what were the ditches of Fort Manhassett in 1865. Fort Manhassett was a series of earthworks constructed by the Confederacy in 1863 to defend the western approaches to Sabine Pass. On January 28, 1987, SH 87 was extended 4.1 miles west to Spur 342, replacing a section of US 75, which was decommissioned south of Dallas.

On November 19, 1926, a spur, SH 87A was designated from Bronson to Hemphill. On March 19, 1930, this route was erroneously omitted from the state highway log. On November 30, 1932, this road was added back to the state highway log, but was renumbered as SH 184. Another SH 87A was designated on November 19, 1928, from Deweyville to Louisiana. This was redesignated as Spur 69 on September 26, 1939.

=== Failed bridge proposal ===
Two ferry routes, and up to five ferries, currently operate on Galveston Bay, taking passengers from Port Bolivar to Galveston Island. Because of increasing traffic, especially during summer months, TxDOT was studying the possibility of building a bridge to connect Galveston Island or Pelican Island to the Bolivar Peninsula; however, the decision was made not to build the bridge.

== Major intersections ==
| County | Location | mi | km | Destinations | Notes |
|---|---|---|---|---|---|
| Galveston | Galveston | 0.0 | 0.0 | I-45 north / Spur 342 south (61st Street) / 71st Street – Houston, Scholes International Airport | |
| Galveston | Galveston | 4.7 | 7.6 | SH 275 west (Harborside Drive / truck route) | |
| Galveston | Galveston | 5.0 | 8.0 | SH 168 north | |
| Galveston | | 5.6– 8.2 | 9.0– 13.2 | Galveston-Port Bolivar Ferry | |
| Galveston | Bolivar Peninsula | 9.3 | 15.0 | Loop 108 north – Port Bolivar | |
| Galveston | Bolivar Peninsula | 11.9 | 19.2 | Loop 108 south | |
| Galveston | Bolivar Peninsula | 35.5 | 57.1 | SH 124 north | |
Gap in route
| Jefferson | | | | McFaddin National Wildlife Refuge | |
| Jefferson | | | | PR 69 – Sea Rim State Park | |
| Jefferson | Sabine Pass | | | FM 3322 east – USCG | |
| Jefferson | Port Arthur | | | bridge over Gulf Intracoastal Waterway | |
| Jefferson | Port Arthur | | | SH 82 – Houston, Cameron, Galveston | |
| Jefferson | Port Arthur | | | Spur 215 north (Savannah Avenue) | |
| Jefferson | Port Arthur | | | US 69 north / US 96 north / US 287 north (Woodworth Boulevard) | Southern terminus of US 69/US 96/US 287 |
| Jefferson | Port Arthur | | | SH 347 north (Jefferson Drive) | |
| Jefferson | Port Arthur | | | SH 73 west / Taft Avenue / Procter Street | interchange; south end of SH 73 overlap |
| Jefferson | Port Arthur | | | FM 366 – Groves, Port Neches | interchange |
| Neches River | | | | Veterans Memorial Bridge / Rainbow Bridge | |
| Orange | Bridge City | | | FM 1442 north | |
| Orange | Cow Bayou | | | Cow Bayou Swing Bridge | |
| Orange | | | | SH 62 north / SH 73 east to I-10 – Mauriceville | north end of SH 73 overlap |
| Orange | | | | FM 1006 east | |
| Orange | Orange | | | FM 105 to SH 62 / FM 1006 – West Orange | |
| Orange | Orange | | | Bus. US 90 west to I-10 – Pinehurst | south end of US 90 Bus. overlap |
| Orange | Orange | | | Bus. US 90 east (West Green Avenue) – Lamar State College–Orange, Museums, Theaters | north end of US 90 Bus. overlap |
| Orange | Orange | | | I-10 (US 90) – Lake Charles | I-10 exit 877 |
| Orange | Orange | | | FM 3247 north | south end of FM 3247 overlap |
| Orange | Orange | | | FM 3247 south – Little Cypress | north end of FM 3247 overlap |
| Newton | | | | SH 12 – Beaumont, Deweyville | |
| Newton | | | | FM 253 – Buna | |
| Newton | | | | FM 2829 east – Old Salem | |
| Newton | | | | FM 1416 north – Bon Wier | |
| Newton | Trout Creek | | | FM 1004 south to US 96 | |
| Newton | | | | FM 2460 east to FM 1416 | |
| Newton | Bleakwood | | | FM 363 – Kirbyville, Bon Wier | |
| Newton | | | | FM 2939 west | |
| Newton | Newton | | | Loop 505 north – Newton | |
| Newton | Newton | | | US 190 – Jasper, Newton, Deridder | |
| Newton | Newton | | | Loop 505 south – Newton | |
| Newton | Newton | | | FM 2626 south to US 190 | |
| Newton | | | | FM 1414 north to SH 63 | |
| Newton | | | | FM 1415 north to SH 63 – Shankleville | |
| Newton | Burkeville | | | SH 63 – Jasper, Leesville | |
| Newton | | | | FM 1415 south – Wiergate | |
| Newton | Mayflower | | | RE 255 to US 96 – Toledo Bend Dam | |
| Sabine | | | | FM 3315 east | |
| Sabine | | | | FM 2928 east | |
| Sabine | Yellowpine | | | FM 2343 south | |
| Sabine | Yellowpine | | | FM 2426 west – Pineland | |
| Sabine | Hemphill | | | FM 944 east | |
| Sabine | Hemphill | | | FM 83 west | south end of FM 83 overlap |
| Sabine | Hemphill | | | SH 184 west | |
| Sabine | Hemphill | | | FM 83 east | north end of FM 83 overlap |
| Sabine | Milam | | | SH 21 – San Augustine, Many | |
| Sabine | Isla | | | FM 276 east (Carters Ferry Road) – Toledo Bend Reservoir | |
| Sabine | Sexton | | | FM 330 south – Geneva | |
| Shelby | | | | FM 353 west – San Augustine | |
| Shelby | | | | FM 1279 west | |
| Shelby | Patroon | | | FM 2261 east – East Hamilton | |
| Shelby | | | | FM 139 south – East Liberty | south end of FM 139 overlap |
| Shelby | | | | FM 139 north – Strong, Ragtown Recreation Area | north end of FM 139 overlap |
| Shelby | | | | SH 147 south – San Augustine | |
| Shelby | Shelbyville | | | FM 417 west | south end of FM 417 overlap |
| Shelby | Shelbyville | | | FM 417 east – Huxley | north end of FM 417 overlap |
| Shelby | | | | FM 414 east | |
| Shelby | Center | | | Loop 500 to US 96 / SH 7 – San Augustine, Shelby College Center | |
| Shelby | Center | | | SH 7 (San Augustine Street / Cora Street) / FM 699 north (Logansport Street) | traffic circle around Shelby County Courthouse |
| Shelby | Center | | | US 96 (Hurst Street / Tenaha Street) to Loop 500 / SH 7 / SH 87 south – San Augustine, Tenaha | |
| Shelby | | | | FM 1645 south | south end of FM 1645 overlap |
| Shelby | | | | FM 1645 north | north end of FM 1645 overlap |
| Shelby | | | | FM 415 south – Silas, Stockman | |
| Shelby | Timpson | | | Spur 470 (Bear Drive) | |
| Shelby | Timpson | | | US 59 / US 84 (Future I-69) | U.S. 59/U.S. 84 are the future Interstate 69 |
1.000 mi = 1.609 km; 1.000 km = 0.621 mi
