= Wier Longleaf Lumber Company =

1918–1942 lumber and milling company in eastern Texas

The Wier Longleaf Lumber Company was a lumber and milling operation established by Robert Withrow Wier (1873–1945) in East Texas that ran from 1918 until 1942. During that period, the company clearcut more than 86,000 acres (350 km²) of virgin pine forest in Newton, Jasper and Sabine counties. Because the city fathers of nearby Burkeville did not appreciate the rough workers Wier's company brought in, Wier established two new towns, Wiergate and Bon Wier, four miles away to house the company's employees. In its heyday, the mill could process approximately 200,000 feet of longleaf yellow pine every 10 hours. Wier also established a railroad to connect the mill and town to Newton. Towards the end of the Second World War, Wier sold his operation and closed down the mill, leading to the decline of Wiergate and Bon Wier.

Although Wier Longleaf Lumber Company provided jobs in this area of the rural South during the Great Depression, it was at the expense of tremendous environmental damage and diminishment of ecological diversity. Whereas before the region was home to southern magnolia, black cherry, and white ash trees, the company reseeded the area with faster-growing loblolly pines. Because by an act of the State of Texas much of this area is now legally protected, the region has begun to redevelop its prior biodiversity.

Today, an unrelated reclaimed lumber company operates under the name Longleaf Lumber, in Cambridge, Massachusetts and Berwick, Maine
