= Forest Heights, Texas =

Unincorporated community in Texas, US

Coordinates: 30°14′02″N 93°45′12″W

Forest Heights is an unincorporated community and census designated place (CDP) in Orange County, Texas, United States. It is located immediately east of State Highway 87 in northeastern Orange County, approximately five miles north of Little Cypress and eight miles north of Orange. As of the 2020 census, Forest Heights had a population of 1,329. Forest Heights is part of the Beaumont–Port Arthur Metropolitan Statistical Area.

Public education in the community is provided by the Little Cypress-Mauriceville Consolidated Independent School District.

== Demographics ==
Historical population
Census	Pop.	Note	%±
2020	1,329		—
U.S. Decennial Census; 1850–1900 1910; 1920 1930 1940; 1950 1960 1970; 1980 1990 2000; 2010 2020

Forest Heights first appeared as a census designated place in the 2020 U.S. census.

=== 2020 Census ===
Forest Heights CDP, Texas – Racial and ethnic composition Note: the US Census treats Hispanic/Latino as an ethnic category. This table excludes Latinos from the racial categories and assigns them to a separate category. Hispanics/Latinos may be of any race.
Race / Ethnicity (NH = Non-Hispanic)	Pop 2020	% 2020
White alone (NH)	1,153	86.76%
Black or African American alone (NH)	9	0.68%
Native American or Alaska Native alone (NH)	13	0.98%
Asian alone (NH)	5	0.38%
Native Hawaiian or Pacific Islander alone (NH)	0	0.00%
Other race alone (NH)	4	0.30%
Mixed race or Multiracial (NH)	64	4.82%
Hispanic or Latino (any race)	81	6.09%
Total	1,329	100.00%

== Education ==
It is in the Little Cypress-Mauriceville Consolidated Independent School District.
