= Trotti, Texas =

Unincorporated community in Texas, US

Coordinates: 30°52′44″N 93°42′32″W

Trotti (formerly Klondike, Old Trotti, and Trottie) is an unincorporated inhabited place located approximately 6 miles (9.7 km) northeast of Newton in Newton County, Texas, United States. The community was established as a logging camp, and was for a time known as Klondike, in association with the gold producing area in Alaska.
