= Texas State Highway Spur 69 =

State highway in Austin, Texas, United States

State Highway Spur 69
- Spur 69 highlighted in red

Route information
- Maintained by TxDOT
- Length: 1.260 mi (2.028 km)
- Existed: 1969–present

Major junctions
- West end: RM 2222 & Lamar Boulevard
- East end: I-35 & US 290

Location
- Country: United States
- State: Texas
- Counties: Travis

Highway system
- Highways in Texas; Interstate; US; State; Former; Toll; Loops; Spurs; FM/RM; Park; Rec
← Spur 68	→ Loop 70

Spur 69 is a 1.2-mile (1.9 km), unsigned, four-lane state highway spur in Austin, Texas, United States, that connects Ranch to Market Road 2222 (RM 2222) and Lamar Boulevard with Interstate 35 (I-35) and U.S.Route 290 (US 290). It is part of Koenig Lane /ˈkeɪnɪɡ/ and is signed over its entire length as RM 2222, rather than as Spur 69.

== Route description ==
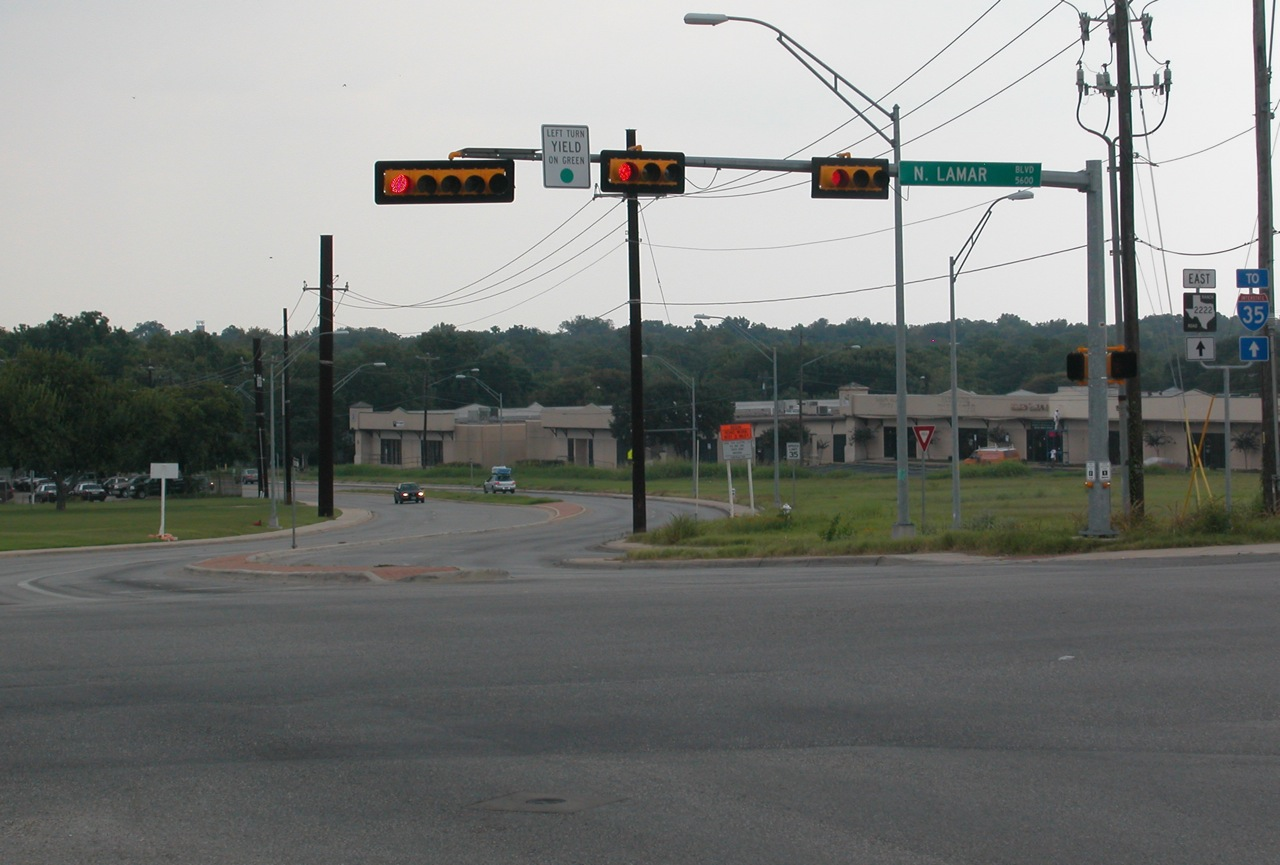
Koenig Lane (Spur 69) heading east from Lamar Boulevard. Note that the road is signed as RM 2222, September 2007

Spur 69 begins at an intersection with North Lamar Boulevard in Austin, where the roadway continues northwest as RM 2222. From here, the highway heads southeast as West Koenig Lane, a four-lane divided highway (signed as RM 2222). The road passes businesses before heading into residential areas with some commercial establishments, becoming East Koenig Lane. Spur 69 crosses the Capital MetroRail Red Line, turning east and becoming an undivided freeway with frontage roads. The highway reaches an interchange with Airport Boulevard south of the Highland Mall and becomes a divided highway again as it comes to a large interchange with I-35 and the west end of US 290. It is east of this interchange that Spur 69 ends and the freeway continues east as part of US 290.

== History ==
The original Spur 69 was established in Deweyville, in Newton County, on September 26, 1939, running from Texas State Highway 87 to the Sabine River as a renumbering of Texas State Highway SH 87A. This road was replaced with a portion of Texas State Highway 235 on October 27, 1945, which became Texas State Highway 12 on August 27, 1959. The current Spur 69 was designated on January 21, 1969, to run from I-35 west to Koenig Lane, near the Southern Pacific railroad tracks. The highway was extended west 0.7 miles (1.1 km) to its current western terminus at RM 2222 and North Lamar Boulevard on January 31, 1972. On October 17, 1989, Spur 69 was replaced with Texas State Highway 169 (a proposed freeway) upon these requirements: local support as exhibited by the passage of a referendum election; and the City of Austin's support of a west/east controlled access facility in this corridor. These requirements were not met, so the designation reverted to Spur 69 on July 19, 1990.

== Major intersections ==
The entire route is in Austin, Travis County.

mi	km	Destinations	Notes
0.0	0.0	RM 2222 west (Koenig Lane)	Continuation west from western terminus
0.0	0.0	Lamar Boulevard	Western terminus
0.9	1.4	Airport Boulevard	West end of freeway
1.260	2.028	I-35	Eastern terminus
1.260	2.028	US 290 east	Continuation east from eastern terminus as a freeway
1.000 mi = 1.609 km; 1.000 km = 0.621 mi

== See also ==
- List of state highway spurs in Texas
