= Newton High School (Texas) =

Location
- 2812 US Hwy 190 E Newton, Texas 75966; United States; 30.82413°N 93.74294°W

Information
- School type: Public High School
- School district: Newton Independent School District
- Principal: Lydia Bean
- Staff: 31.57 (FTE)
- Grades: 9–12
- Enrollment: 278 (2023–2024)
- Student to teacher ratio: 8.81
- Colors: Purple & White
- Athletics conference: UIL Class 3A
- Mascot: Eagle
- Yearbook: The Eagle
- Website: www.newtonisd.net/91108_2

Newton High School is a public high school located in Newton, Texas, United States and classified as a 3A school by the UIL. It is part of the Newton Independent School District located in central Newton County. In 2015, the school was rated "Met Standard" by the Texas Education Agency.

== Athletics ==
The Newton Eagles compete in: Cross Country, Volleyball, Football, Basketball, Powerlifting, Track, Softball & Baseball, Cheer. In 2005 after being hit by Hurricane Rita the football program won the State Championship by going undefeated. On September 24, 2010 during a district game at Buna, Texas, current head coach Curtis Barbay was rushed by ambulance to St. Elizabeth Hospital in Beaumont, Texas, where he would die that following morning he was 68 years old, Barbay would become #4 winning coach in the State of Texas with 317 wins at Newton, after his death, Coach Curtis Barbay would become a Texas High School hall of famer in 2024. Newton would then hire W.T. Johnston as the next head coach in 2010. during the summer of 2018, after winning the State Championship. Johnston would gather his players, that he didn't have much longer to live, Johnston would survive to watch his players to win the 2018 State Championship, during the post game speech, Johnston would give a spiritual message, and that speech would go make its way to Good Morning America, ESPN, and ESPN College Gameday in the 2019 season. On May 11, 2019 Johnston would die at the age of 54 years old. Newton is currently the top ten powerhouse in the State of Texas and currently on 85 district winning streak that started in 2011, during the 2025 season Newton football team would become the first team to host College Football Game Of The Week, making them the first none college team to ever host the event.

Currently the head coach is Drew Johnston who played for the 2005 State Championship team.

=== State titles ===
- Football - 1974(2A), 1998(3A/D2), 2005(2A/D1), 2017(3A/D2), 2018(3A/D2)

==== State finalists ====
- Football - 2004(2A/D1), 2014(3A/D2), 2025(3A/D2)

== Notable alumni ==
- Sam Forse Collins, member of the Texas House of Representatives
- James Gulley (born 1965), professional basketball player for Ironi Ramat Gan in the Israeli Basketball Premier League
