= Alexander Gilmer =

American businessman (1829–1906)

Alexander Gilmer (September 7, 1829 – July 30, 1906) was a sawmiller that became one of the United States' most successful individual timberland owners in his era.

== Biography ==
Nicknamed "Sandy", he was born on September 7, 1829, in County Armagh, the son of George and Jane Gilmer. He immigrated to Georgia at the age of seventeen where he constructed shipmasts for the French government with his brother John. Together, they built a steamboat to work the Chattahoochee, but suffered a major setback when it sank, leaving Gilmer almost penniless. In the late 1840s, he migrated to Orange, Texas, where he entered the shipbuilding business with his cousin George C. Gilmer. The two would shortly after enter the mercantile business and continue until the Civil War. Alexander participated in the war as a Confederate blockade runner in The Battle of Sabine Pass.

In 1866, Gilmer founded his first sawmill. He would eventually own sawmills and lumberyards in as many as ten communities. One of these, named Remlig (Gilmer spelled backwards) would become one of the largest businesses in Jasper County. Gilmer had a series of economic setbacks. He lost his sawmill at Orange four times due to fire, after which he re-built his main operation at Lemonville (now a ghost town) in northern Orange County.
Alexander Gilmer was married twice. His first wife Etta Reading died within the first year of the marriage. His second wife Cleora C. Thomas bore 9 children, two of which died as infants. In his last days, Gilmer traveled to San Antonio for health reasons before making his last business trip to New York City where he died, on July 30, 1906. At the time of his death, he was the second wealthiest man in Orange, Texas. The Texas Historical Commission has constructed a marker to commemorate his business contributions.

Some of Alexander Gilmer's papers were salvaged from a storefront in Orange, Texas and are now housed at the Briscoe Center for American History at the University of Texas at Austin. The papers include personal letters, business logs, and political letters.
