= Isla, Texas =

Isla
- Location within Texas
- Coordinates: 31°30′19″N 93°50′44″W
- Country: United States
- State: Texas
- County: Sabine
- Elevation: 253 ft (77 m)
- GNIS feature ID: 1388577

Isla is an unincorporated community in northeastern Sabine County, Texas, United States.

The community is located at the junction of State Highway 87 and Farm to Market Road 276, eleven miles northeast of Hemphill.

A post office was established in 1896 and by the mid-1930s, Isla had an estimated population of twenty-five, along with three businesses.
