= Wiergate, Texas =

Unincorporated community in Texas, US

Coordinates: 31°00′12″N 93°42′27″W

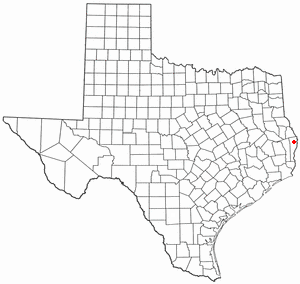
Location of Wiergate, Texas

Wiergate is a small unincorporated community in Newton County, Texas, United States. It is in the far eastern part of the state lies approximately 70 miles (110 km) northeast of Beaumont near State Highways 63 and 87. Its population today hovers at approximately 450 (recorded as 461 in the 1990 US Census).

== Historical development ==
Along with Bon Wier, it was founded as a company town to service the needs of Wier Longleaf Lumber Company, the last of the major lumber milling operations in East Texas which was founded by Robert Withrow Wier (1873–1945) and family in 1917. At its height in the 1920s and 1930s, it had a population of over 2,500, but with the sale of the lumber mill in 1944, the population slowly declined to its current levels.
