= Adsul =

Adsul may refer to:

- Adsul, Texas, an unincorporated community
- Anandrao Vithoba Adsul (born 1947), an Indian politician
