= Lemonville, Texas =

Ghost town in Texas, U.S.

Coordinates: 30°12′52″N 93°50′45″W

Lemonville is a ghost town that was the site of the Lemon Lumber Company in northern Orange County, Texas, United States, in the southeastern part of the state. Sometimes referred to as Lemon, it is located north of Orange and just east of Mauriceville. The town plat was filed in 1901 by a man named William Manuel, with the location chosen for its proximity to the tracks of the Kansas City Southern Railroad. In 1902, when the population was about 300, a post office was established, with Cornelius P. Ryan as first postmaster.

In 1900, the mill had a capacity of 30,000 feet (9,100 m) per day. The lumber baron Alexander Gilmer purchased the mill in 1904, and by the following year production was increased to 100,000 feet (30,000 m) per day with the addition of new equipment. After Gilmer’s death in 1906, the sawmills at Lemonville were owned and operated by others, including the Miller-Link and Peavy-Moore lumber companies.

As the nearby lumber eventually became depleted, and as lumber prices fell, the operators eventually abandoned the site. The Lemonville post office was officially closed in 1928.

== See also ==
- Ghost town, and List of ghost towns
