= Belgrade, Texas =

American ghost town

Coordinates: 30°41′09″N 93°39′49″W

Belgrade is a ghost town in Newton County, in the U.S. state of Texas. Located near Farm to Market Road 1416 and one mile west of the Sabine River, Belgrade was a thriving community until the beginning of the Civil War. Now abandoned, a cemetery still remains, as well as a centennial marker. It was named after Belgrade, the capital of Serbia.
