= Bolivar Bridge =

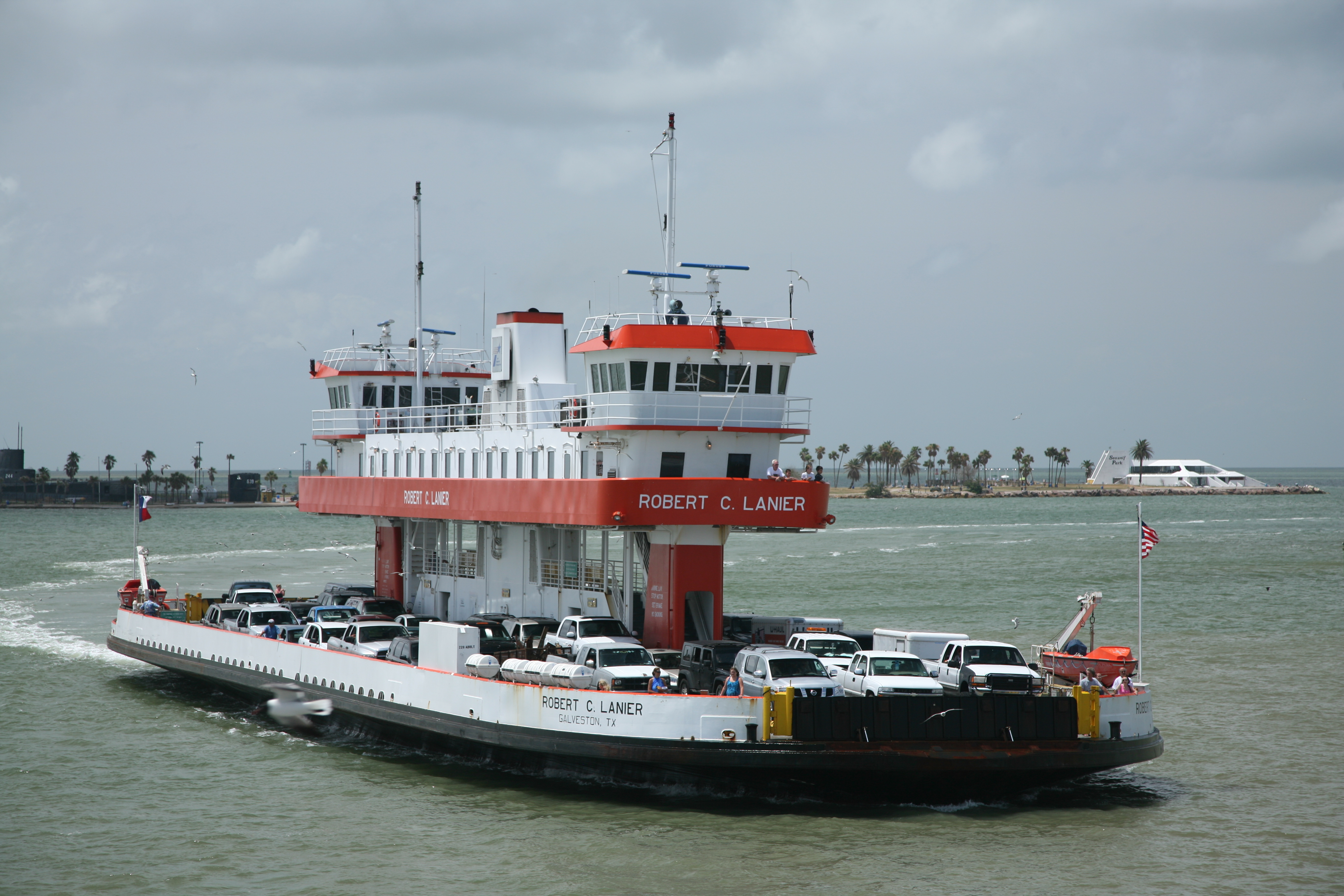
- Robert C. Lanier Bolivar Ferry between Galveston Island and Bolivar Peninsula
- Coordinates: 29°21′01″N 94°47′03″W
- Locale: Galveston Island
- Named for: Bolivar Peninsula
- Preceded by: Bolivar Ferry

Location
- Interactive map of Bolivar Bridge

The Bolivar Bridge was a proposed bridge connecting Galveston Island and the Bolivar Peninsula in the United States state of Texas. Its intention was to replace the Bolivar Ferry, the only direct connection for traffic from Galveston Island. In 2007, it was decided that the study would not move forward due to a failure in finding a toll partner to leverage funds, leaving everything as is.

== Galveston-Port Bolivar Ferry ==
Service between Galveston and Port Bolivar is currently provided via a ferry operated by the Texas Department of Transportation (TxDOT) linking both halves of State Highway 87. The state-operated ferry has operated since 1934, replacing earlier operations.

Due to the rapid growth of the Greater Houston area (which includes Galveston County), the commute time required to board the ferry has rapidly increased (during the summer the wait can be up to two hours), which slows emergency response times (there are few emergency services, and no hospitals, on the peninsula, thus requiring trips to Galveston). Maintenance costs for the ferry crossing have risen to approximately $12 million per year, a 200 percent increase in the last eight years alone. The ferry is unusable in the event a tropical storm or hurricane approaches the area, thus forcing evacuating traffic onto the other two egresses from the island (Interstate 45 and a two-lane toll bridge on the west end of the island), and projected ship traffic in Galveston Bay (including the Houston Ship Channel) is expected to increase dramatically in the coming years.

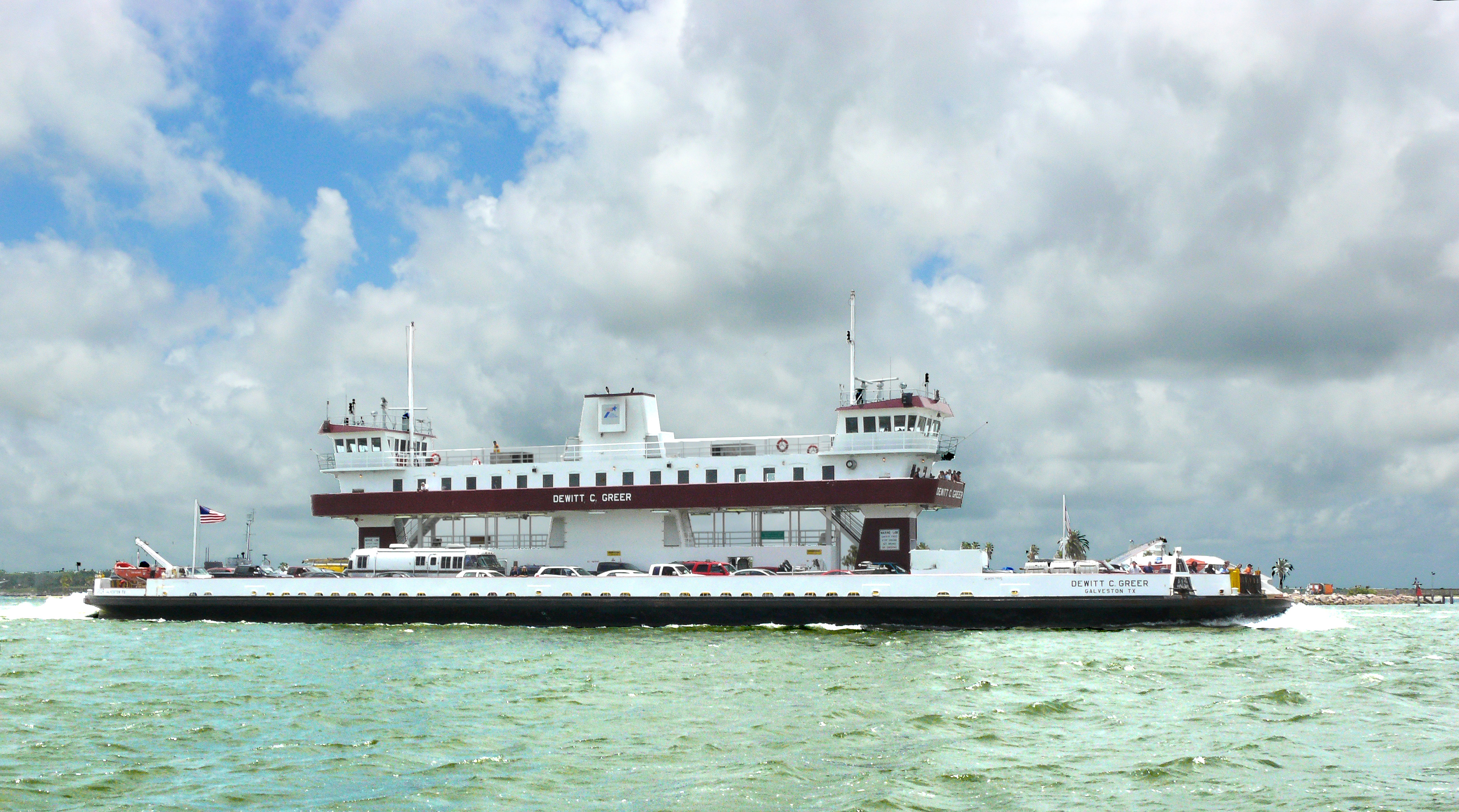
Dewitt C. Greer Boat at Bolivar Ferry

The original ferry consisted of three vessels. Traditionally, these have been named for significant directors of the TxDOT. The first three vessels were named "Cone Johnson", "E.H. Thornton, Jr." and "R.S. Sterling". All three of these original ferry boats have been replaced with five slightly larger vessels. The first two had fixed shaft/propeller designs as the original boats. The following three were built with the same basic hull, but steerable prop pods. The oldest of the second generation boats is named "Gibb Gilchrist", followed by the "Robert C. Lanier", "Dewitt C. Greer", "Ray Stoker, Jr.", and the "Robert H. Dedman". The latter 4 vessels are all painted in a differing color scheme to honor various universities of Texas. In the order above, these schemes are Orange/White for UT, Maroon/White for Texas A&M, Green/Gold for Baylor, and Red/Blue for SMU. The current fleet of ferries comprises seven vessels, the newest of which is the Esperanza "Hope" Andrade which entered service in the spring of 2024.

== Proposal ==
In 2000, TxDOT identified immediate need for improvements to the ferry crossing, specifically a third landing site (which is under construction), and also identified that the best long-term solution was to replace the ferry with a bridge linking Galveston and Port Bolivar. The option to make the bridge a toll bridge is being considered along with other options.

TxDOT held meetings with the Galveston and Port Bolivar communities to obtain input. A third ferry landing being built was considered an interim solution only; the long-term goal is a permanent fixed crossing.

TxDOT identified the following alternatives:

- "No Build" (no improvements) – rejected as ferry system is at capacity
- Expansion of ferry system – rejected as the system cannot be relied upon during evacuation or bad weather
- Tunnel Crossing – rejected due to high cost and vehicle/cargo restrictions

The final solution was to build a bridge between the communities. Four tentative corridors were identified:

- Route 1-1, using the existing State Highway 87 corridor
- Route 1-2, using the Galveston Seawall as a corridor
- Route 1-3, using nearby Pelican Island (immediately north of Galveston Island) as a corridor at approximately 29.350219°N 94.784075°W.
- Route 2 (including alternatives 2-1, 2-2, and 2-3), using the Texas City Dike as a corridor

The preferred corridor is Route 1-3, the Pelican Island alternative. One estimate for the cost of the bridge was $240 million.

== Cancellation of project ==
After numerous environmental studies, TxDOT worked with the Houston-Galveston district and made a final plan to cancel the project. The plan was canceled in 2007. Failure to find a partner, such as a county or city toll agency or a private developer, to support the project was a deciding factor for not building the bridge. Harris County Toll Road Authority was previously interested, but lost interest. The ferry systems will remain as the access point to the Bolivar Peninsula from Galveston Island.

== Related links ==
- Bolivar bridge might get Houston help (2002)
- State scraps Bolivar bridge plan (2007)
