= Texas State Highway Spur 342 =

State highway in Texas

State Highway Spur 342
- 61st Street
- Spur 342 highlighted in red

Route information
- Maintained by TxDOT
- Length: 1.683 mi (2.709 km)
- Existed: 1960–present

Major junctions
- South end: FM 3005 in Galveston
- North end: I-45 / SH 87 in Galveston

Location
- Country: United States
- State: Texas

Highway system
- Highways in Texas; Interstate; US; State; Former; Toll; Loops; Spurs; FM/RM; Park; Rec
← Spur 341	→ Loop 343

Spur 342 is a state highway spur route located completely within the city of Galveston, Texas. Officially named Butterowe Boulevard, but mostly known by locals as 61st Street, it stretches two miles (3.2 km) across Galveston Island.

== Route description ==
Spur 342 begins at an intersection with Seawall Boulevard on the Galveston Seawall in Galveston, Galveston County, heading north-northwest on 61st Street, a six-lane divided highway. From here, FM 3005 heads west on Seawall Boulevard. Spur 342 heads through commercial resort areas with some residences. After passing more businesses, the highway crosses Offats Bayou. A short distance later, Spur 342 comes to its northern terminus at an interchange with I-45 in a commercial area.

== History ==
Spur 342 was designated onto its current alignment on September 26, 1960. It has remained there since.

== Major intersections ==
The entire route is in Galveston, Galveston County.

mi	km	Destinations	Notes
0.000	0.000	FM 3005 west (Seawall Boulevard)	Southern terminus; eastern terminus of FM 3005
1.683	2.709	I-45 north (Gulf Freeway) / SH 87 north (Broadway Avenue J)	Northern terminus; southern terminus and exit 1A on I-45; southern terminus of SH 87
1.000 mi = 1.609 km; 1.000 km = 0.621 mi
