= Kirbyville High School =

Coordinates: 30.6502°N 93.8951°W

Location
- 100 Wildcat Dr; Kirbyville, Texas 75956-2496; United States

Information
- School type: Public high school
- School district: Kirbyville Consolidated Independent School District
- Principal: Gena McClatchy
- Staff: 37.70 (FTE)
- Grades: 9-12
- Enrollment: 427 (2023–2024)
- Student to teacher ratio: 11.33
- Colors: Red, black, and white
- Athletics conference: UIL Class 3A
- Mascot: Wildcat
- Newspaper: The Wildcat Roar
- Yearbook: Wildcat
- Website: Kirbyville High School

Kirbyville High School is a public high school in Kirbyville, Texas, United States and classified as a 3A school by the UIL. It is part of the Kirbyville Consolidated Independent School District which is located in central Jasper County. In 2015, the school was rated "Met Standard" by the Texas Education Agency.

== Athletics ==
The Kirbyville Wildcats compete in the following sports -

Volleyball, Cross Country, Football, Basketball, Powerlifting, Golf, Tennis, Track, Baseball & Softball

=== State Titles ===
- Boys Basketball -
  - 1968(2A)
- Softball -
  - 2003(3A)

=== State Finalist ===
- Football -
  - 2008(2A)
  - 2009(2A)
- Baseball -
  - 2019(3A)
