= Sam Forse Collins =

American politician (1928–2021)

Member of the Texas House of Representatives
- In office January 13, 1959 – January 12, 1965

Personal details
- Born: June 9, 1928 New Orleans, Louisiana
- Died: November 3, 2021 (aged 93) Newton, Texas
- Party: Democratic

Sam Forse Collins (June 9, 1928 – November 3, 2021) was an American politician. He served as a Democratic member in the Texas House of Representatives from 1959 to 1964.

== Life and career ==
Collins was born in New Orleans, Louisiana, the son of Sam Cody Collins and Onie Lelee Forse. He grew up in Newton, Texas. Following his graduation from Newton High School, Collins attended Stephen F. Austin State University and Baylor University, graduating from the latter. He was married to Doris Shofner (died 1955) and Sue Johnson.

Besides his position in the Texas House of Representatives, Collins worked for the Sabine River Authority for 35 years, where he served as a general manager, and was a local sports announcer and historian.

Collins died November 3, 2021, in Newton, Texas.
