= Shankleville, Texas =

Shankleville
- Unincorporated community
- Location within Texas Location within the United States
- Coordinates: 30°58′13″N 93°42′25″W
- Country: United States
- State: Texas
- County: Newton
- Elevation: 217 ft (66 m)
- Time zone: UTC-6 (Central (CST))
  - Summer (DST): UTC-5 (CDT)
- GNIS feature ID: 1380524

Shankleville is an unincorporated community in Newton County, Texas, United States, founded by James and Winnie Shankle and Stephen McBride. It was founded as a Freedmen's town, one of over 500 such "freedom colonies" in Texas.

== James and Winnie Shankle ==
Jim (James) and Winnie (Brush) Shankle were the first Black couple in Newton County, Texas to purchase land. The Shankles were born enslaved, Jim in Kentucky in 1811 and Winnie in Tennessee in 1814. Winnie had three children prior to meeting Jim Shankle on a plantation of Isaac Rollins in Wayne County, Mississippi. The family was later separated when Winnie and the children were sold to a man moving from Mississippi to Newton County in East Texas. Following Winnie's departure, Jim self-liberated from the plantation in Mississippi, searching for his family; Jim traveled 400 miles on foot to East Texas, where the plantation owner arranged to purchase Jim as well. Along with Winnie's three children, the couple had six of their own: George Washington Rollins, Tobe Perkins, Mary Rollins (McBride), George, Henry, Houston, John, Harriet (Odom), B.M. (Lewis).

Following Emancipation, the Shankles and their son-in-law (husband of Mary) Stephen McBride began purchasing land in Newton County in 1867. They eventually owned over 4,000 acres and their neighborhood would grow to include farms, churches, grist mills, cotton gin, sawmills, cotton mill, store, blacksmith, and schools. Stephen McBride gave the land for a school and cemetery and built McBride College in 1883, which remained in operations until 1909.

== History ==
Shankleville was founded in 1867 by James "Jim" and Winnie (Brush) Shankle and Stephen McBride, the first African Americans to purchase land, become leaders of the settlement, and develop the town after the Emancipation Proclamation. Named in honor of the Jim and Winnie, Shankleville was one of ten freedmen's settlements established in Newton County following the Civil War, including Biloxi, Cedar Grove, Galloway, Huff Creek, Indian Hills, Jamestown, Liberty, Pleasant Hill, and St. John.

The Shankles bought "a league" of land and invited other families to live and create businesses there, amassing land holdings over 4,000 acres. "Shankleville began as a rural community where African-Americans could live and farm their own land away from the violence of white supremacist activities, the strictures of segregation, and the economic enslavement of sharecropping, or working for less than subsistence wages as domestic servants and in other menial jobs," the U.S. Department of the Interior notes in its National Register of Historic Places designation of Shankleville's Addie L. and A.T. Odom Homestead.

At Shankleville, a single family—the interrelated Shankle-McBride clan—had unusual financial resources that they initially used to purchase land early on, which fostered the development of the community (Handbook of Texas Online: "Freedmen's Settlements"). At its peak, Shankleville is thought to have housed about 75 families. The settlement prospered and included schools, churches, a cotton gin, saw mill, grist mill, sugarcane mill, store, and blacksmith.

Stephen McBride gave the land for a school and cemetery. McBride College was a two-story structure which operated from 1883 to 1909. Named after Stephen McBride, the school also served as a community center and town hall. During summer, teachers came to attend training conferences and seminars. When school was not in session, McBride College was also used to host revivals featuring traveling preachers.

== Preservation, conversation, and media ==
The descendants of Shankleville are involved in historic research, community preservation, and family genealogy. Annual homecomings have been held since 1941 on the first weekend of August each year.

The Shankleville Historical Society was founded in 1988 to "preserve the heritage", "document the history", and "propagate the legacy" of Shankleville. The society hosts many cultural events in honor of Shankleville, including the annual Texas Purple Hull Pea Festival which celebrated its sesquicentennial homecoming in 2017. The festival features cultural events commemorating different historical aspects of the settlement. Purple-hull peas were a historic cash crop and a staple of the local economy. Currently, the Shankleville Historical Society and the Texas Freedom Colonies Project are working to raise awareness of Shankleville and other similar settlements.

Good Morning America host and retired NFL player and Hall of Fame Defensive End Michael Strahan is a descendant of Jim and Winnie Shankle. The show Finding Your Roots, confirmed the Shankles were Strahan's 3rd paternal great-grandparents.
