= Calaboose Museum =

Museum in Kirbyville, Texas, U.S.

The Calaboose Museum is located on East Lavielle Street in Kirbyville, Texas. The museum was built in 1910 as the city jail. It houses many artifacts and photographs, as well as an abundance of historical facts about Kirbyville and the surrounding area.

== Additional Information ==
The museum is open to tours every Friday and Saturday. Any additional information can be acquired by calling 409-423-3028.
