= Little Cypress-Mauriceville Consolidated Independent School District =

School district in Texas, United States

Address
- 6586 FM 1130 Orange, Texas, 77632; United States

District information
- Type: Public
- Grades: PK–12
- Established: 1927
- Superintendent: Stacey Brister
- Schools: 6
- NCES District ID: 4827690

Students and staff
- Students: 3,241 (2023–2024)
- Teachers: 252.76 (on an FTE basis) (2023–2024)
- Staff: 268.14 (on an FTE basis) (2023–2024)
- Student–teacher ratio: 12.82 (2023–2024)
- District mascot: Bear
- Colors: Green and gold

Other information
- Website: www.lcmcisd.org

Little Cypress-Mauriceville Consolidated Independent School District is a public school district located in northeastern Orange County, Texas (USA).

The district serves the communities of Forest Heights, Little Cypress, and Mauriceville as well as sections of Orange.

In 2009, the school district was rated "academically unacceptable" by the Texas Education Agency.
