= Texas State Highway Loop 108 =

State highway in Texas

State Highway Loop 108
- Loop 108 highlighted in red

Route information
- Maintained by TxDOT
- Length: 3.922 mi (6.312 km)

Major junctions
- South end: SH 87 in Port Bolivar
- North end: SH 87 in Port Bolivar

Location
- Country: United States
- State: Texas

Highway system
- Highways in Texas; Interstate; US; State; Former; Toll; Loops; Spurs; FM/RM; Park; Rec
← Loop 107	→ Loop 109

Loop 108 is a 3.922-mile-long (6.312 km) state highway loop in Port Bolivar, Texas.

== Route description ==
Loop 108 begins at an intersection with SH 87 near Fort Travis Seashore Park on the Gulf of Mexico in Galveston County, heading northwest on two-lane undivided 7th Street. The road heads through marshland before heading into the community of Port Bolivar. Here, Loop 108 turns northeast onto Broadway Avenue while Spur 108 continues northwest on 7th Street. The highway heads between residential areas and wetlands before leaving Port Bolivar. Loop 108 runs through more coastal marshes and turns southeast onto Kingston Beach Road, ending at another intersection with SH 87.

== History ==
The designation originally belonged to Spur 108, which was designated on July 1, 1940, from U.S. Highway 281 to Lipan. On March 26, 1942, this route was redesignated as FM 7, which was redesignated as an extension of FM 4 on October 23, 1949. On March 26, 1980, the present routing was designated, replacing a former route of FM 2612.

== Major intersections ==
The entire route is in Port Bolivar, Galveston County.

mi	km	Destinations	Notes
0.000	0.000	SH 87	
		Spur 108 north (7th Street)	
3.922	6.312	SH 87	
1.000 mi = 1.609 km; 1.000 km = 0.621 mi
