= Kirbyville Consolidated Independent School District =

School district in Texas, United States

Address
- 206 East Main Street Kirbyville, Texas, 75956; United States

District information
- Type: Public
- Grades: PK–12
- Schools: 3
- NCES District ID: 4825710

Students and staff
- Students: 1,458 (2023–2024)
- Teachers: 108.27 (on an FTE basis) (2023–2024)
- Staff: 112.43 (on an FTE basis) (2023–2024)
- Student–teacher ratio: 13.47 (2023–2024)

Other information
- Website: www.kirbyvillecisd.org

Kirbyville Consolidated Independent School District is a public school district based in Kirbyville, Texas (USA).

Located in Jasper County, a small portion of the district extends into Newton County.

In 2009, the school district was rated "academically acceptable" by the Texas Education Agency.

== Schools ==
- Kirbyville High School (Grades 9–12)
- Kirbyville Junior High School(Grades 7–8)
- Kirbyville Elementary School(Grades PK–6)
