= Kirbyville, Texas =

City in Jasper County, Texas, United States

- City
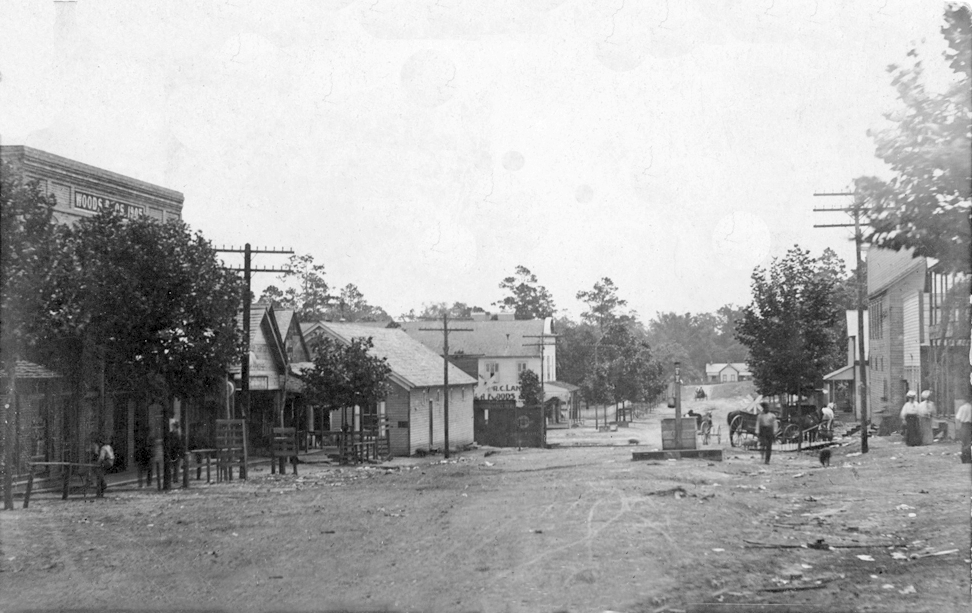
- Kirbyville, circa 1907
- Nickname: K-Ville
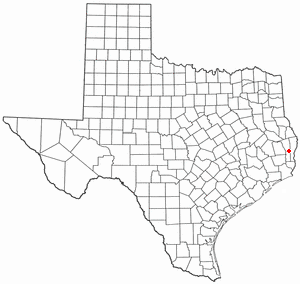
- Location of Kirbyville, Texas

- Coordinates: 30°39′28″N 93°54′00″W
- Country: United States
- State: Texas
- County: Jasper

Area
  - Total: 2.42 sq mi (6.28 km^{2})
  - Land: 2.42 sq mi (6.26 km^{2})
  - Water: 0.0077 sq mi (0.02 km^{2})
- Elevation: 105 ft (32 m)

Population (2020)
  - Total: 2,036
  - Density: 856.1/sq mi (330.56/km^{2})
- Time zone: UTC-6 (Central (CST))
  - Summer (DST): UTC-5 (CDT)
- ZIP code: 75956
- Area code: 409
- FIPS code: 48-39460
- GNIS feature ID: 2411551
- Website: cityofkirbyville.com

Kirbyville is a city in Jasper County, Texas, United States. The population was 2,036 at the 2020 census.

== History ==
=== Early development ===
The town was first established in 1895 when the Gulf, Beaumont, and Kansas City railroad reached the site. It was first named Kirby for John Henry Kirby, a lumber businessman who intended to use the site for building a facility to market his lumber. The post office was established the same year, but the name was changed to Kirbyville when a town already called Kirby was discovered. The town became incorporated in 1926.

=== Significant events ===
On September 24, 2005, Hurricane Rita made landfall in extreme Southwest Louisiana as a Category 3 hurricane. As Rita moved inland, the center of the storm moved very near Kirbyville. According to the National Weather Service, wind gusts around the area reached speeds of up to 120 mph. As a result, wind damage throughout the town and surrounding towns was extensive. Several buildings in the city sustained damage, some of which sustained major damage or were destroyed. Many residents were without power for several weeks due to the storm.

== Geography ==
According to the United States Census Bureau, the city has a total area of 2.4 square miles (6.2 km^{2}), of which 2.4 square miles (6.2 km^{2}) is land and 0.41% is covered by water.

=== Climate ===
The climate of Kirbyville and surrounding areas consists of mainly hot and humid summers, while winters are usually mild. According to the Köppen Climate Classification system, Kirbyville has a humid subtropical climate, mainly because of its close proximity to the warm waters of the Gulf of Mexico.

Climate data for Kirbyville, Texas
Month	Jan	Feb	Mar	Apr	May	Jun	Jul	Aug	Sep	Oct	Nov	Dec	Year
Record high °F (°C)	90 (32)	86 (30)	90 (32)	98 (37)	97 (36)	101 (38)	104 (40)	105 (41)	105 (41)	98 (37)	94 (34)	87 (31)	105 (41)
Mean daily maximum °F (°C)	57 (14)	60 (16)	68 (20)	76 (24)	83 (28)	89 (32)	91 (33)	92 (33)	87 (31)	78 (26)	67 (19)	59 (15)	76 (24)
Mean daily minimum °F (°C)	39 (4)	42 (6)	49 (9)	56 (13)	65 (18)	71 (22)	73 (23)	73 (23)	68 (20)	57 (14)	49 (9)	41 (5)	57 (14)
Record low °F (°C)	6 (−14)	11 (−12)	17 (−8)	27 (−3)	35 (2)	46 (8)	51 (11)	55 (13)	34 (1)	22 (−6)	22 (−6)	13 (−11)	6 (−14)
Average precipitation inches (mm)	5.28 (134)	4.69 (119)	4.96 (126)	3.94 (100)	4.49 (114)	6.18 (157)	3.90 (99)	4.02 (102)	4.29 (109)	5.55 (141)	6.34 (161)	6.14 (156)	59.78 (1,518)

== Demographics ==
Historical population
Census	Pop.	Note	%±
1920	1,165		—
1930	1,184		1.6%
1940	1,088		−8.1%
1950	1,150		5.7%
1960	1,660		44.3%
1970	1,869		12.6%
1980	1,972		5.5%
1990	1,871		−5.1%
2000	2,085		11.4%
2010	2,142		2.7%
2020	2,036		−4.9%
U.S. Decennial Census

=== 2020 census ===
As of the 2020 census, Kirbyville had a population of 2,036 and 511 families; the median age was 37.7 years. 28.3% of residents were under the age of 18 and 17.6% of residents were 65 years of age or older. For every 100 females there were 86.6 males, and for every 100 females age 18 and over there were 81.6 males age 18 and over.

0.0% of residents lived in urban areas, while 100.0% lived in rural areas.

There were 809 households in Kirbyville, of which 34.5% had children under the age of 18 living in them. Of all households, 37.0% were married-couple households, 17.1% were households with a male householder and no spouse or partner present, and 40.4% were households with a female householder and no spouse or partner present. About 35.8% of all households were made up of individuals and 15.8% had someone living alone who was 65 years of age or older.

There were 951 housing units, of which 14.9% were vacant. The homeowner vacancy rate was 2.5% and the rental vacancy rate was 9.8%.

Racial composition as of the 2020 census
Race	Number	Percent
White	1,456	71.5%
Black or African American	377	18.5%
American Indian and Alaska Native	30	1.5%
Asian	2	0.1%
Native Hawaiian and Other Pacific Islander	3	0.1%
Some other race	32	1.6%
Two or more races	136	6.7%
Hispanic or Latino (of any race)	140	6.9%

=== 2000 census ===
As of the census of 2000, 2,085 people, 828 households, and 550 families resided in the city. The population density was 856.1 inhabitants per square mile (330.5/km^{2}). The 931 housing units averaged 382.2 per square mile (147.3/km^{2}). The racial makeup of the city was 76.31% White, 21.20% African American, 0.34% Native American, 0.29% Asian, 1.20% from other races, and 0.67% from two or more races. Hispanics or Latinos of any race were 2.69% of the population.

Of the 828 households, 32.5% had children under the age of 18 living with them, 43.5% were married couples living together, 18.8% had a female householder with no husband present, and 33.5% were not families. About 30.7% of all households were made up of individuals, and 14.6% had someone living alone who was 65 years of age or older. The average household size was 2.42 and the average family size was 3.01.

In the city, the population was distributed as 27.4% under the age of 18, 9.0% from 18 to 24, 24.3% from 25 to 44, 21.0% from 45 to 64, and 18.4% who were 65 years of age or older. The median age was 37 years. For every 100 females, there were 79.3 males. For every 100 females age 18 and over, there were 72.2 males.

The median income for a household in the city was $25,438, and for a family was $32,381. Males had a median income of $30,144 versus $20,060 for females. The per capita income for the city was $12,839. About 22.6% of families and 26.1% of the population were below the poverty line, including 33.9% of those under age 18 and 17.2% of those age 65 or over.

== Arts and culture ==
- The Calaboose Museum in displays artifacts from the city's rich history.
- The Palace Theater in Downtown Kirbyville hosts the Country Music Show on the second Saturday of every month.

== Education ==
The City of Kirbyville is served by the Kirbyville Consolidated Independent School District and home to the Kirbyville High School Wildcats.

== Notable people ==
- Ernest "Bubba" Bean, football player who was born in Kirbyville
- Ivory Joe Hunter, R&B singer, was born in Kirbyville in 1914
- Bhob Stewart, writer, editor, cartoonist, and filmmaker

== See also ==
- List of municipalities in Texas
