= Hemphill, Texas =

City in and county seat of Sabine County, Texas, United States

- City
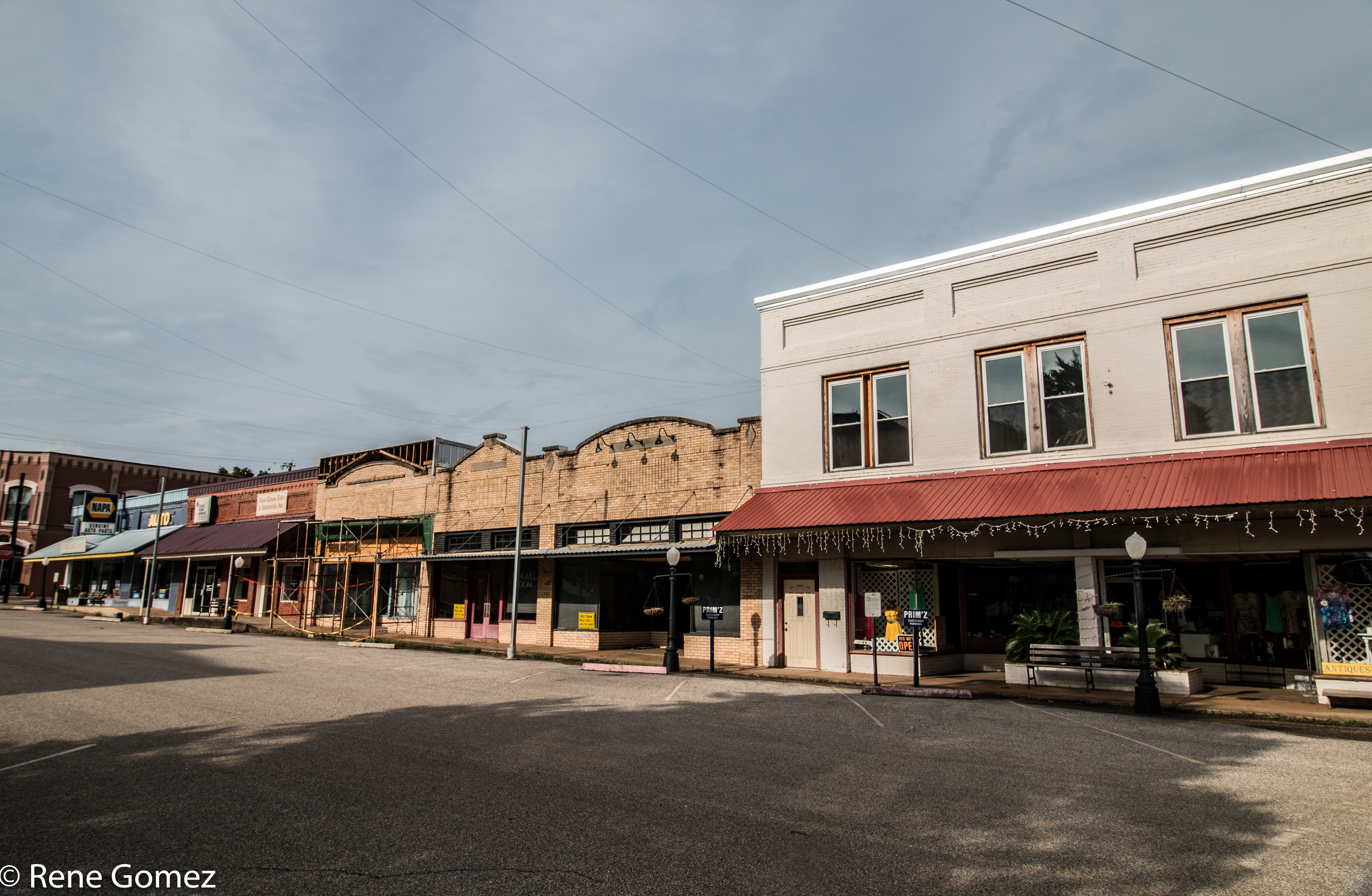
- Hemphill, June 2017

- Seal

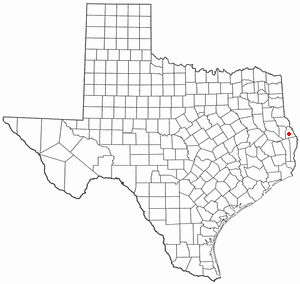
- Location of Hemphill, Texas

- Coordinates: 31°20′35″N 93°51′04″W
- Country: United States
- State: Texas
- County: Sabine

Area
  - Total: 2.55 sq mi (6.60 km^{2})
  - Land: 2.54 sq mi (6.58 km^{2})
  - Water: 0.0077 sq mi (0.02 km^{2})
- Elevation: 266 ft (81 m)

Population (2020)
  - Total: 1,029
  - Density: 490.0/sq mi (189.19/km^{2})
- Time zone: UTC-6 (Central (CST))
  - Summer (DST): UTC-5 (CDT)
- ZIP code: 75948
- Area code: 409
- FIPS code: 48-33188
- GNIS feature ID: 2410739
- Website: www.cityofhemphill.com

Hemphill is a city in and the county seat of Sabine County, Texas, United States. The population was 1,029 at the 2020 census. It is the county seat of Sabine County. It is located on State Highway 87 at the junction of State Highway 184, and is surrounded by the Sabine National Forest and the Toledo Bend Reservoir.

== Historical development ==
In 1858 the Sabine County voters elected to move the county seat from Milam, in the east along the Sabine River, to a more central part of the county. The following year, the plans for the town were laid down, with the post office opening as well. The Town was named after John Hemphill, an early Texas judge and legal scholar, and later a United States senator.

The location was ideal in terms of being centrally located in relation to other settlements, but it initially had poor transportation access, as it was neither located on the Sabine River or existing rail lines. In 1912, the Lufkin, Hemphill and Gulf Railway provided Hemphill with rail connections. This construction also supported nearby lumber operations. After the timber was depleted and sawmills closed in these communities, by 1938 the line would be abandoned.

== Geography ==
According to the United States Census Bureau, the city has a total area of 2.4 square miles (6.2 km^{2}), of which 2.4 square miles (6.2 km^{2}) is land and 0.04 square miles (0.10 km^{2}) (1.66%) is water.

Hemphill is 484 miles (as the crow flies) from Hemphill County (which is in the northern Panhandle). This is the largest separation of a Texas city from a Texas county of the same name.

== Demographics ==
Historical population
Census	Pop.	Note	%±
1930	731		—
1940	739		1.1%
1950	972		31.5%
1960	913		−6.1%
1970	1,005		10.1%
1980	1,353		34.6%
1990	1,182		−12.6%
2000	1,106		−6.4%
2010	1,198		8.3%
2020	1,029		−14.1%
U.S. Decennial Census

=== 2020 census ===
As of the 2020 census, Hemphill had a population of 1,029 and a median age of 47.6 years. 21.0% of residents were under the age of 18 and 27.2% of residents were 65 years of age or older. For every 100 females there were 87.8 males, and for every 100 females age 18 and over there were 84.8 males age 18 and over.

There were 412 households in Hemphill, of which 34.2% had children under the age of 18 living in them. Of all households, 37.6% were married-couple households, 22.3% were households with a male householder and no spouse or partner present, and 33.5% were households with a female householder and no spouse or partner present. About 31.1% of all households were made up of individuals, and 16.3% had someone living alone who was 65 years of age or older. Of these households, 313 were families.

There were 532 housing units, of which 22.6% were vacant. The homeowner vacancy rate was 1.7% and the rental vacancy rate was 16.2%.

0.0% of residents lived in urban areas, while 100.0% lived in rural areas.

Racial composition as of the 2020 census
Race	Number	Percent
White	811	78.8%
Black or African American	118	11.5%
American Indian and Alaska Native	3	0.3%
Asian	16	1.6%
Native Hawaiian and Other Pacific Islander	0	0.0%
Some other race	29	2.8%
Two or more races	52	5.1%
Hispanic or Latino (of any race)	77	7.5%

=== 2000 census ===
As of the 2000 census, there were 1,106 people, 467 households, and 301 families residing in the city. The population density was 465.3 inhabitants per square mile (179.7/km^{2}). There were 574 housing units at an average density of 241.5 per square mile (93.2/km^{2}). The racial makeup of the city was 77.40% White, 16.82% African American, 0.63% Native American, 3.62% from other races, and 1.54% from two or more races. Hispanic or Latino of any race were 5.61% of the population.

There were 467 households, out of which 27.2% had children under the age of 18 living with them, 45.8% were married couples living together, 15.6% had a female householder with no husband present, and 35.5% were non-families. 32.1% of all households were made up of individuals, and 19.5% had someone living alone who was 65 years of age or older. The average household size was 2.35 and the average family size was 2.96.

In the city, the population was spread out, with 25.8% under the age of 18, 8.0% from 18 to 24, 24.2% from 25 to 44, 21.6% from 45 to 64, and 20.4% who were 65 years of age or older. The median age was 39 years. For every 100 females, there were 80.4 males. For every 100 females age 18 and over, there were 80.8 males.

The median income for a household in the city was $25,781, and the median income for a family was $33,839. Males had a median income of $30,000 versus $20,417 for females. The per capita income for the city was $15,674. About 14.1% of families and 20.8% of the population were below the poverty line, including 31.5% of those under age 18 and 18.6% of those age 65 or over.

== Education ==
The City of Hemphill is served by the Hemphill Independent School District.

== Recreation ==
The nearby Toledo Bend and Sam Rayburn lakes attract many tourists during the summer months.

== Killing of Loyal Garner Jr. ==
On Christmas night 1987, Loyal Garner Jr. of Florien, Louisiana, a 34-year-old African-American truck driver and married father of six, was arrested with two companions for alleged drunk driving in Sabine County. After being beaten on a bridge near the Toledo Bend area by the Hemphill Police Department's Chief of Police, Thomas Ladner, and two deputies which were called for by Ladner, Loyal Garner Jr. was taken to the Sabine County Jail. The following morning, he was found comatose in his cell. Garner was taken for treatment to a local hospital and then to one in the city of Tyler, Texas, seat of Smith County, where he died after neurosurgery. Officials in Tyler thought the death suspicious, as an autopsy showed evidence of beating, and they refused to return the body to Hemphill until completing their own investigation. Ladner and two sheriff deputies were tried in Hemphill of violating Garner's civil rights and acquitted, to cheers by whites in the courtroom. Garner's family sued city officials for his death, and the city settled with the family for an undisclosed amount. In 1990, Ladner and the two Sabine County Sheriff's Office deputies were convicted of murder by a jury in Tyler, and sentenced to lengthy prison terms, especially for Ladner.

The difference in the two trial verdicts has been attributed in part to the composition and attitudes of the juries. African-Americans in Hemphill comprised about 20 percent of the small town's population. They conducted their first civil rights protest after Ladner's acquittal, and founded the first chapter here of the NAACP. The circumstances of Garner's death and the two trials of Hemphill law enforcement officers had attracted national media attention. The protest and associated events were also covered by CBS 60 Minutes.

== Space Shuttle Columbia disaster ==
In February 2003, the town and its vicinity were one of the key search areas for wreckage from the Space Shuttle Columbia after it broke up over Texas. Search teams recovered some of the remains of the shuttle and crew members, and the Orbiter Experiment Support System recorder (OEX) was found near Hemphill.

A memorial has been erected in Hemphill commemorating the deceased Columbia astronauts. The memorial is located at the intersection of Hwy 87 North and Hwy 83 East.

On the eighth anniversary of the disaster, the Patricia Huffman Smith NASA "Remembering Columbia" Museum was opened in Hemphill on February 1, 2011, in a new building constructed next to the J.R. Huffman Public Library. The museum is named for the late wife of philanthropist Al Smith, who donated most of the money to build the museum. The Sugar Land real estate developer also exports construction materials. He and his wife had also donated money for the library a decade before. The new museum features the permanent "NASA Remembering Columbia" exhibit. It includes many items donated by area families who worked on the search for remains, as well as items from families of the astronauts, and official material from NASA, which operates the museum.

== Climate ==
The climate in this area is characterized by hot, humid summers and generally mild to cool winters. According to the Köppen Climate Classification system, Hemphill has a humid subtropical climate, abbreviated "Cfa" on climate maps.

== Photo gallery ==
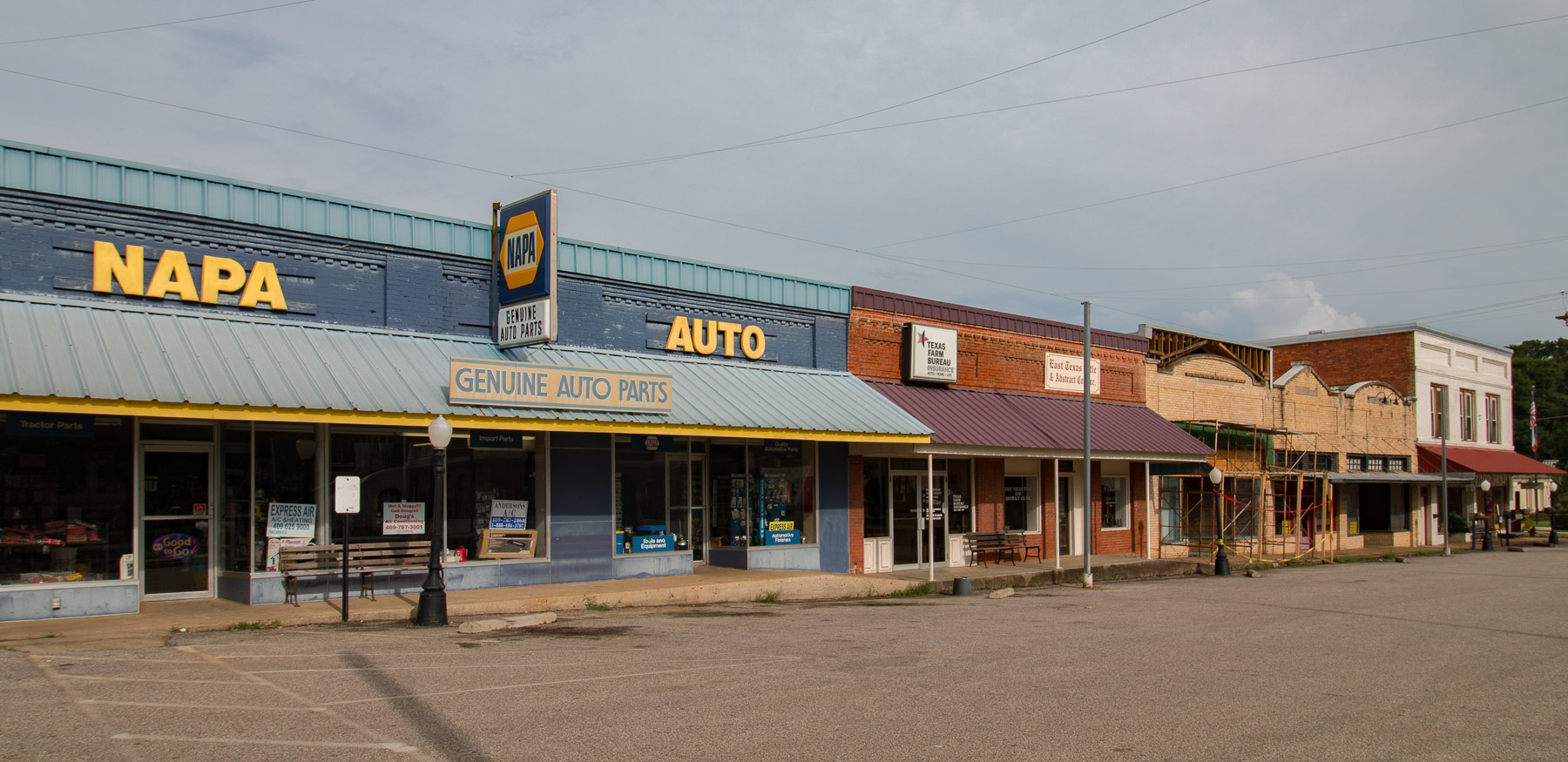
Downtown Hemphill

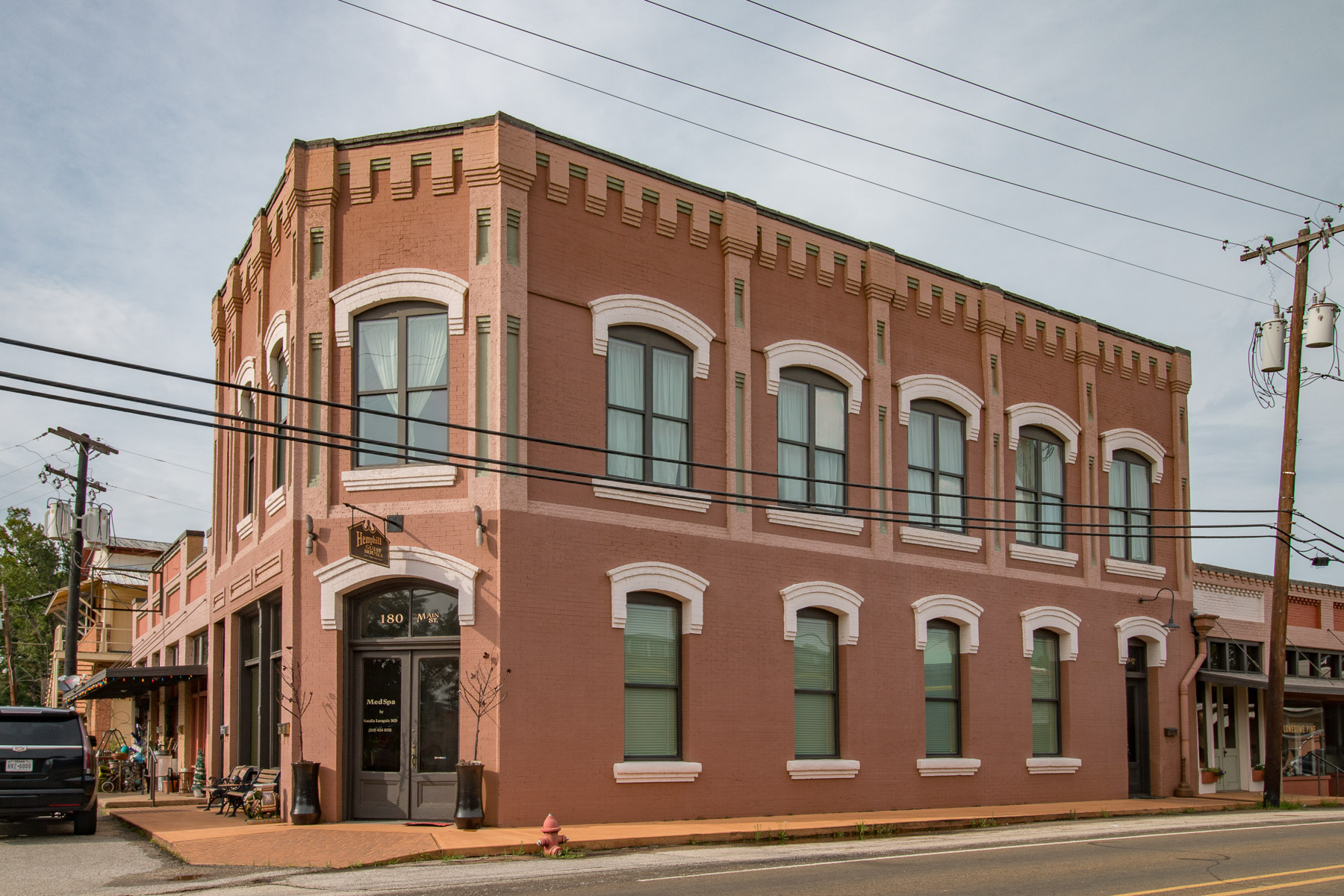
Downtown Hemphill

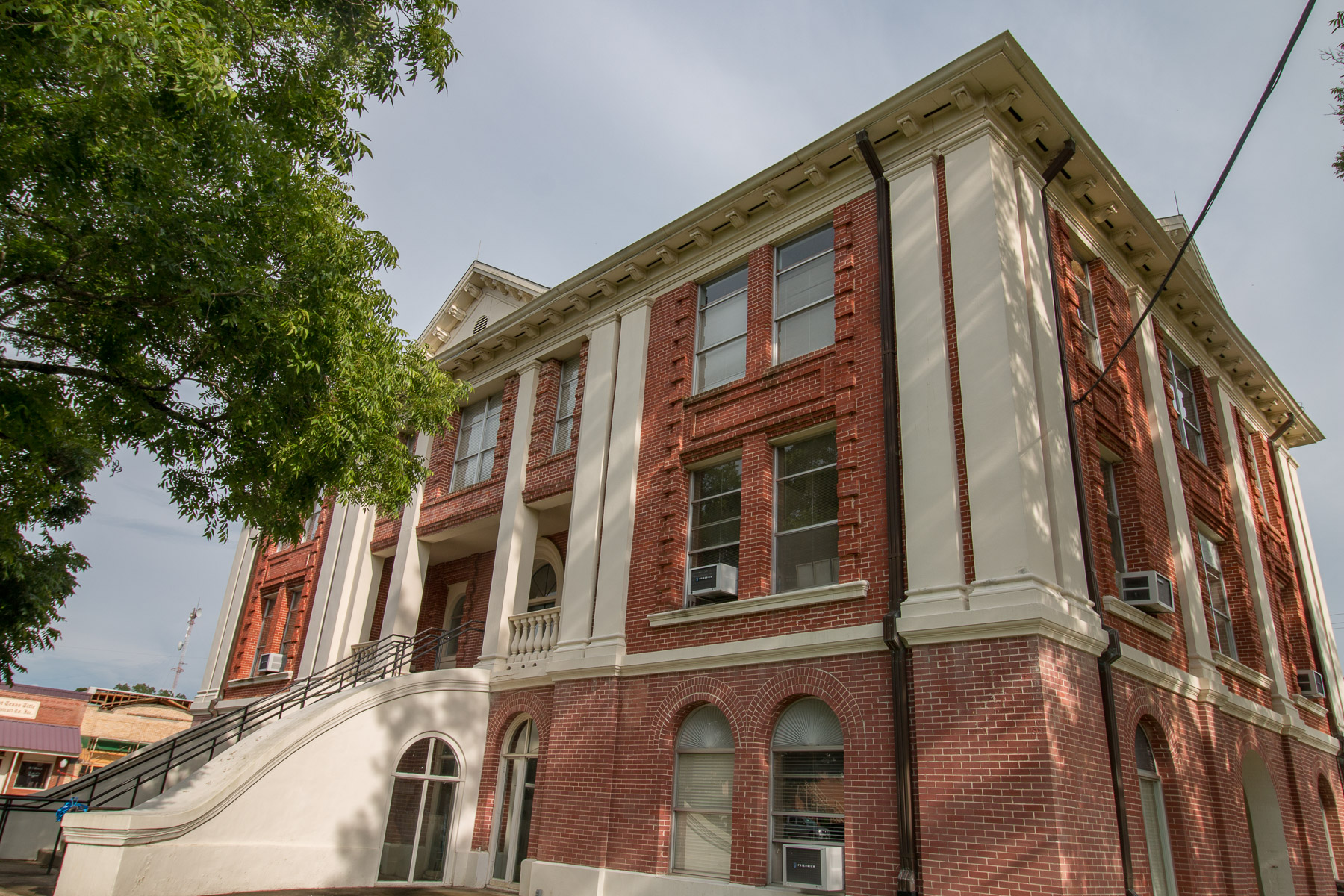
Sabine County Courthouse

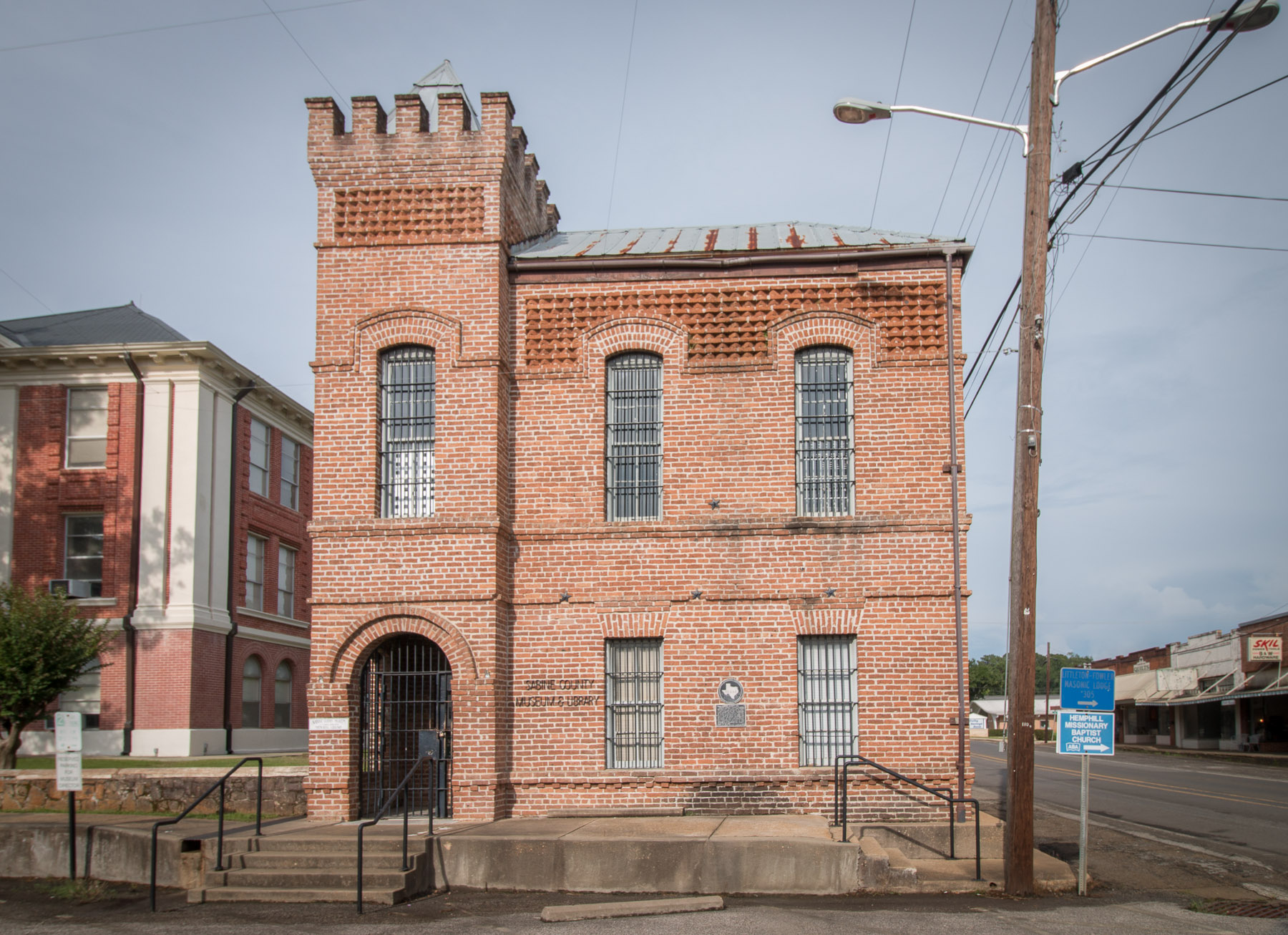
Sabine County Jail

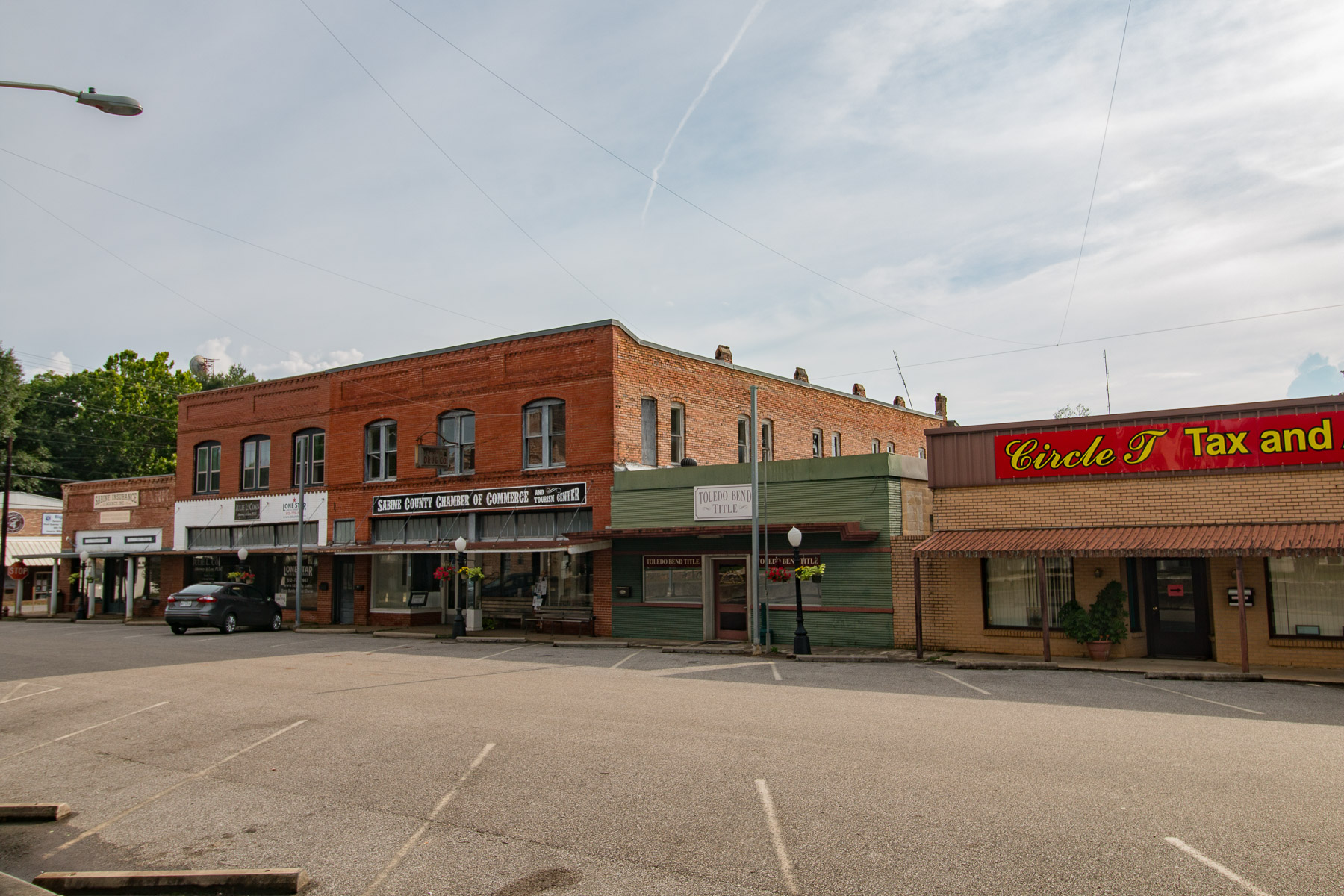
Downtown Hemphill

== See also ==
- List of municipalities in Texas
