= Orange County, Texas =

County in Texas, United States

- County
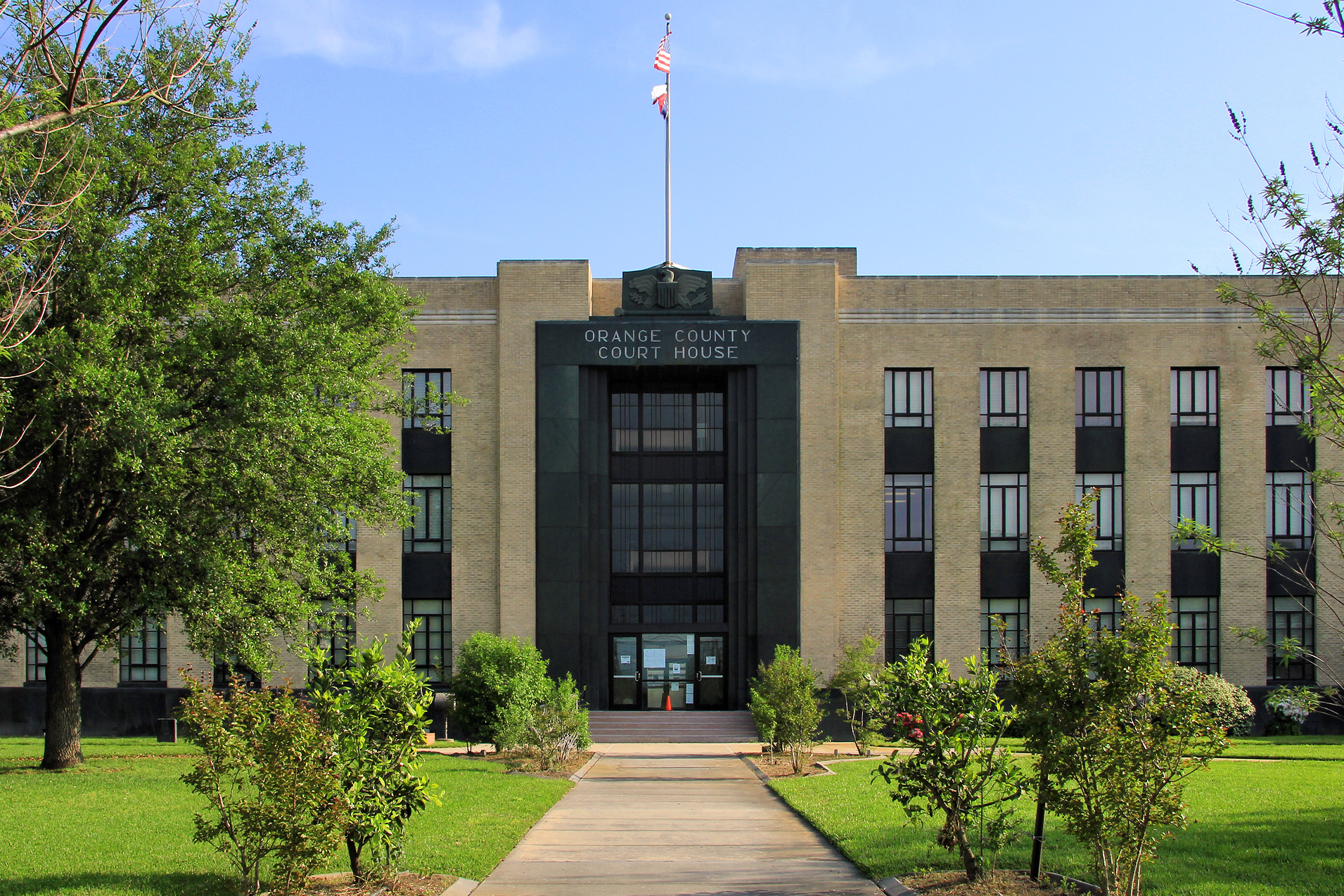
- The Orange County Courthouse in Orange

- Flag Seal

- Location within the U.S. state of Texas
- Coordinates: 30°08′N 93°53′W
- Country: United States
- State: Texas
- Founded: January 5, 1852
- Named for: Orange fruit
- Seat: Orange
- Largest city: Orange

Area
  - Total: 380 sq mi (980 km^{2})
  - Land: 334 sq mi (870 km^{2})
  - Water: 46 sq mi (120 km^{2}) 12%

Population (2020)
  - Total: 84,808
  - Estimate (2025): 86,266 ▲
  - Density: 220/sq mi (85/km^{2})
- Time zone: UTC−6 (Central)
  - Summer (DST): UTC−5 (CDT)
- Congressional district: 14th
- Website: www.co.orange.tx.us

Orange County is a county located in the very southeastern corner of the U.S. state of Texas, sharing a boundary with Louisiana, within the Golden Triangle of Texas. As of the 2020 census, its population was 84,808. The county seat is the city of Orange, and it falls within the Beaumont–Port Arthur metropolitan area.

== History ==
Orange County was formed in 1852 from portions of Jefferson County. It was named after the orange fruit, the common citrus fruit grown by the early settlers of this county near the mouth of the Sabine River. Due to periodic spells of quite cold winter weather (frosts) in Orange County, it is no longer the home of orange trees and citrus orchards. The production of those fruits in Texas long ago was moved a long way southwest into the Rio Grande Valley, where the weather is almost always warm all winter long. Citrus trees produce their fruit in the wintertime, which makes them especially vulnerable to frost and icy weather.

A similar thing has happened in Florida, where orchards of citrus trees no longer exist in either Citrus County or Orange County because of bad winter freezes in some years. In both Florida and Texas, the citrus agriculture has been moved farther south in search of milder winters, and away from the periodic frosts.

During World War II, Orange County was the home of a large amount of shipbuilding for the navies of the United States and allied countries. The major shipbuilder, Consolidated Steel Corporation, was located in the town of Orange, and among the warships that it built were the USS Aulick (DD-569) (1942), the first warship built there, the USS Pope (DE-134) (1943), and the USS Carpenter (DD-825) (1945–46), the last warship built there. During the war, the Consolidate Steel Corporation employed as many as 20,000 people at its shipyard in Orange.

== Geography ==
According to the U.S. Census Bureau, the county has a total area of 380 sq mi (980 km^{2}), of which 334 sq mi (870 km^{2}) are land and 46 sq mi (120 km^{2}) (12%) are covered by water.

Orange County is bordered on its east by the Sabine River, on its southeast by Sabine Lake, and on the northwest by the Neches River.

The geography of Orange County varies relatively little, with an elevation that reaches 33 ft (10 m) above sea level at very few points within the county. Orange County is very flat, and its soil is quite sandy, as could be expected in a county along the Gulf of Mexico. (Sandy soil is also common in southern Louisiana, Mississippi, and Alabama, and in western and southern Florida.) Saltwater marshes occur in much of the southeastern part of Orange County that borders the Sabine River. The Piney Woods are in the northern part of the county.

=== Adjacent counties and parishes ===
- Jasper County (north)
- Newton County (north)
- Hardin County (northwest)
- Jefferson County (west)
- Calcasieu Parish, Louisiana (east)
- Cameron Parish, Louisiana (southeast)

=== National protected area ===
- Big Thicket National Preserve (part)

== Communities ==
=== Cities ===
- Bridge City
- Orange (county seat)
- Pine Forest
- Pinehurst
- Port Arthur (mostly in Jefferson County)
- Rose City
- Vidor
- West Orange

=== Census-designated places ===
- Forest Heights
- Little Cypress
- Mauriceville

=== Unincorporated communities ===
- Orangefield

=== Ghost towns ===
- Lemonville
- Texla

== Demographics ==
Historical population
Census	Pop.	Note	%±
1860	1,916		—
1870	1,255		−34.5%
1880	2,938		134.1%
1890	4,770		62.4%
1900	5,905		23.8%
1910	9,528		61.4%
1920	15,379		61.4%
1930	15,149		−1.5%
1940	17,382		14.7%
1950	40,567		133.4%
1960	60,357		48.8%
1970	71,170		17.9%
1980	83,838		17.8%
1990	80,509		−4.0%
2000	84,966		5.5%
2010	81,837		−3.7%
2020	84,808		3.6%
2025 (est.)	86,266	▲	1.7%
U.S. Decennial Census; 1850–2010 2010–2020

=== Racial and ethnic composition ===
Orange County, Texas – Racial and ethnic composition Note: the US Census treats Hispanic/Latino as an ethnic category. This table excludes Latinos from the racial categories and assigns them to a separate category. Hispanics/Latinos may be of any race.
Race / Ethnicity (NH = Non-Hispanic)	Pop 1980	Pop 1990	Pop 2000	Pop 2010	Pop 2020	% 1980	% 1990	% 2000	% 2010	% 2020
White alone (NH)	74,595	71,142	72,955	67,895	64,935	88.98%	88.37%	85.86%	82.96%	76.57%
Black or African American alone (NH)	6,806	6,734	7,080	6,922	7,981	8.12%	8.36%	8.33%	8.46%	9.41%
Native American or Alaska Native alone (NH)	195	182	391	340	343	0.23%	0.23%	0.46%	0.42%	0.40%
Asian alone (NH)	442	477	652	797	1,108	0.53%	0.59%	0.77%	0.97%	1.31%
Native Hawaiian or Pacific Islander alone (NH)	x	x	19	38	13	x	x	0.02%	0.05%	0.02%
Other race alone (NH)	38	41	21	73	196	0.05%	0.05%	0.02%	0.09%	0.23%
Mixed race or Multiracial (NH)	x	x	775	1,006	2,967	x	x	0.91%	1.23%	3.50%
Hispanic or Latino (any race)	1,762	1,933	3,073	4,766	7,265	2.10%	2.40%	3.62%	5.82%	8.57%
Total	83,838	80,509	84,966	81,837	84,808	100.00%	100.00%	100.00%	100.00%	100.00%

=== 2020 census ===
As of the 2020 census, the county had a population of 84,808. The median age was 39.4 years. 24.0% of residents were under the age of 18 and 17.1% of residents were 65 years of age or older. For every 100 females there were 97.7 males, and for every 100 females age 18 and over there were 95.2 males age 18 and over.

The racial makeup of the county was 78.9% White, 9.5% Black or African American, 0.5% American Indian and Alaska Native, 1.3% Asian, <0.1% Native Hawaiian and Pacific Islander, 3.3% from some other race, and 6.4% from two or more races. Hispanic or Latino residents of any race comprised 8.6% of the population.

63.9% of residents lived in urban areas, while 36.1% lived in rural areas.

There were 32,811 households in the county, of which 32.4% had children under the age of 18 living in them. Of all households, 49.9% were married-couple households, 18.8% were households with a male householder and no spouse or partner present, and 25.5% were households with a female householder and no spouse or partner present. About 25.5% of all households were made up of individuals and 11.2% had someone living alone who was 65 years of age or older.

There were 37,313 housing units, of which 12.1% were vacant. Among occupied housing units, 74.0% were owner-occupied and 26.0% were renter-occupied. The homeowner vacancy rate was 1.8% and the rental vacancy rate was 14.5%.

=== 2000 census ===
As of the 2000 census, 84,966 people, 31,642 households, and 23,794 families resided in the county. The population density was 238 people per square mile (92 people/km^{2}). The 34,781 housing units averaged 98 units per square mile (38/km^{2}). The racial makeup of the county was 87.98% White, 8.38% African American, 0.56% Native American, 0.78% Asian, 1.15% from other races, and 1.15% from two or more races. About 3.62% of the population was Hispanic or Latino of any race.

Of the 31,642 households, 35.30% had children under the age of 18 living with them, 58.80% were married couples living together, 12.10% had a female householder with no husband present, and 24.80% were not families. About 21.7% of all households were made up of individuals, and 9.30% had someone living alone who was 65 years of age or older. The average household size was 2.65 and the average family size was 3.08.

In the county, the population was distributed as 27.30% under the age of 18, 8.70% from 18 to 24, 28.10% from 25 to 44, 23.20% from 45 to 64, and 12.70% who were 65 years of age or older. The median age was 36 years. For every 100 females, there were 96.40 males. For every 100 females age 18 and over, there were 92.60 males.

The median income for a household in the county was $37,586, and for a family was $44,152. Males had a median income of $40,185 versus $21,859 for females. The per capita income for the county was $17,554. About 11.40% of families and 13.80% of the population were below the poverty line, including 18.50% of those under age 18 and 12.40% of those age 65 or over.

== Government ==
The Orange County Courthouse serves as the court for the region. Republican County Judge John Gothia presides over the five-member Orange County Commissioners' Court.

Orange County lies in Texas House District 21, represented beginning in 2015 by Republican Dade Phelan of Beaumont.

=== United States Congress ===
Senators	Name	Party	First Elected	Level
Senate Class 1	John Cornyn	Republican	2002	Senior Senator
Senate Class 2	Ted Cruz	Republican	2012	Junior Senator
Representatives	Name	Party	First Elected	Area(s) of Orange County Represented
District 14	Randy Weber	Republican	New district created with 2020 census. First elected 2012	Entire county

=== Politics ===
United States presidential election results for Orange County, Texas
Year	Republican		Democratic		Third party(ies)	
Year	No.	%	No.	%	No.	%
1912	22	3.32%	549	82.81%	92	13.88%
1916	92	10.42%	758	85.84%	33	3.74%
1920	121	9.34%	1,055	81.47%	119	9.19%
1924	509	26.33%	1,385	71.65%	39	2.02%
1928	919	42.43%	1,247	57.57%	0	0.00%
1932	244	7.93%	2,830	91.94%	4	0.13%
1936	190	7.66%	2,281	92.01%	8	0.32%
1940	358	10.60%	3,011	89.19%	7	0.21%
1944	910	15.58%	4,500	77.05%	430	7.36%
1948	987	14.49%	4,957	72.76%	869	12.76%
1952	4,491	41.15%	6,403	58.67%	19	0.17%
1956	5,501	47.99%	5,910	51.56%	51	0.44%
1960	5,483	37.46%	9,078	62.02%	76	0.52%
1964	6,216	39.73%	9,390	60.02%	39	0.25%
1968	5,886	27.74%	6,485	30.57%	8,845	41.69%
1972	13,234	64.63%	7,172	35.02%	72	0.35%
1976	9,147	37.36%	15,177	61.99%	160	0.65%
1980	12,389	44.43%	14,928	53.53%	570	2.04%
1984	15,386	47.63%	16,816	52.06%	101	0.31%
1988	11,959	39.99%	17,834	59.63%	115	0.38%
1992	9,793	30.14%	15,305	47.11%	7,392	22.75%
1996	12,560	42.85%	13,741	46.88%	3,010	10.27%
2000	17,325	58.42%	11,887	40.09%	442	1.49%
2004	20,292	63.60%	11,476	35.97%	140	0.44%
2008	21,509	73.14%	7,646	26.00%	251	0.85%
2012	23,366	76.12%	6,800	22.15%	529	1.72%
2016	25,513	79.73%	5,735	17.92%	752	2.35%
2020	29,186	81.09%	6,357	17.66%	451	1.25%
2024	30,191	83.08%	5,945	16.36%	202	0.56%

United States Senate election results for Orange County, Texas1
Year	Republican		Democratic		Third party(ies)	
Year	No.	%	No.	%	No.	%
2024	29,050	80.78%	6,285	17.48%	626	1.74%

United States Senate election results for Orange County, Texas2
Year	Republican		Democratic		Third party(ies)	
Year	No.	%	No.	%	No.	%
2020	28,720	80.46%	6,249	17.51%	724	2.03%

Texas Gubernatorial election results for Oldham County
Year	Republican		Democratic		Third party(ies)	
Year	No.	%	No.	%	No.	%
2022	21,153	84.28%	3,722	14.83%	224	0.89%

== Economy ==
Primary economic activities in Orange County are the petroleum refining industry, paper milling, rice farming, and shrimping.

Orange County was formerly a center for the building of warships, and a large U.S. Navy ghost fleet (reserve fleet) still exists in Jefferson County - from which currently, many old warships are being cleaned of water pollution sources and then scrapped for their metals, thus employment for residents of Orange County in shipbreaking.

Newspapers published in the county include the twice-weekly Orange Leader and weeklies including the Bridge City-based Penny Record, County Record, and Vidor Vidorian.

== Transportation ==
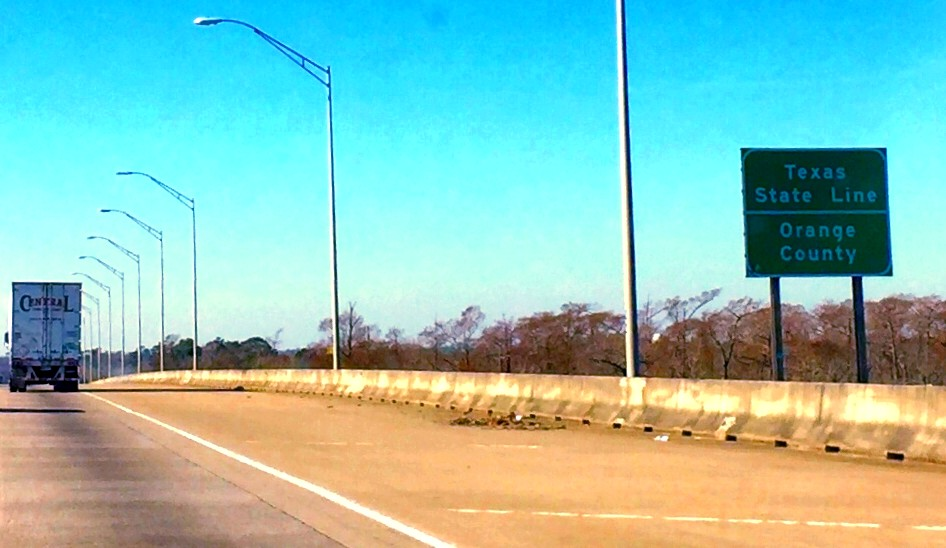
Orange County's eastern county line borders the state of Louisiana, as seen from Interstate 10

=== Airports ===
Orange County Airport operates general-aviation flights.

Nearby Southeast Texas Regional Airport (Port Arthur) operates commercial flights.

=== Major highways ===
- Interstate 10
- U.S. Highway 90
- State Highway 12
- State Highway 62
- State Highway 73
- State Highway 87

== Education ==
The county is served by five school districts: Bridge City ISD, Little Cypress-Mauriceville Consolidated ISD, Orangefield ISD, Vidor ISD, and West Orange-Cove Consolidated ISD.

The Texas Legislature specifies community college districts for most places in Texas; as of 2026 it has not directly assigned any areas in Orange County to a specific community college district.

== See also ==
- National Register of Historic Places listings in Orange County, Texas
- Recorded Texas Historic Landmarks in Orange County
