= Biloxi, Texas =

Unincorporated community in Texas, US

Coordinates: 30°37′21″N 93°44′1″W

Location of Biloxi

Biloxi is an unincorporated community in eastern Newton County, Texas, United States, in the East Texas region. It was named either for Biloxi, Mississippi, or the Biloxi Indians. Biloxi had many plantations in the pre–Civil War era. It is located on the border between Texas and Louisiana. Nowadays, the population is relatively small.
