= Adsul, Texas =

Unincorporated community in Texas, US

Coordinates: 30°38′35″N 93°50′35″W

Adsul is an unincorporated community in Newton County, in the U.S. state of Texas.

== History ==
A post office was established at Adsul in 1907, and remained in operation until 1911. The town's name is an amalgamation of Adams and Sullivan, the owners of a local sawmill.
