= Newton Independent School District =

School district in Texas, United States

Address
- 720 Rusk Street Newton, Texas, 75966; United States

District information
- Type: Public
- Grades: PK–12
- Schools: 3
- NCES District ID: 4832730

Students and staff
- Students: 927 (2023–2024)
- Teachers: 90.69 (on an FTE basis) (2023–2024)
- Staff: 109.91 (on an FTE basis) (2023–2024)
- Student–teacher ratio: 10.22 (2023–2024)

Other information
- Website: www.newtonisd.net

Newton Independent School District is a public school district based in Newton, Texas (USA).

In 2009, the school district was rated "academically acceptable" by the Texas Education Agency.

== Schools ==
- Newton High School (Grades 9-12)
- Newton Middle (Grades 6-8)
- Newton Elementary (Grades PK-5)
