= Little Cypress, Texas =

Unincorporated community in Texas, US

Coordinates: 30°10′18″N 93°44′40″W

Little Cypress is a large unincorporated community and census designated place (CDP) in the northern area of Orange in Orange County, Texas, United States. As of the 2020 census, Little Cypress had a population of 1,968. It is part of the Beaumont–Port Arthur Metropolitan Statistical Area. The settlement was probably named for nearby Little Cypress Bayou and began sometime after the Civil War, when the first school was built.

== Demographics ==
Historical population
Census	Pop.	Note	%±
2020	1,968		—
U.S. Decennial Census; 1850–1900 1910; 1920 1930 1940; 1950 1960 1970; 1980 1990 2000; 2010 2020

Little Cypress first appeared as a census designated place in the 2020 United States census.

=== 2020 Census ===
Little Cypress CDP, Texas – Racial and ethnic composition Note: the US Census treats Hispanic/Latino as an ethnic category. This table excludes Latinos from the racial categories and assigns them to a separate category. Hispanics/Latinos may be of any race.
Race / Ethnicity (NH = Non-Hispanic)	Pop 2020	% 2020
White alone (NH)	1,673	85.01%
Black or African American alone (NH)	63	3.20%
Native American or Alaska Native alone (NH)	5	0.25%
Asian alone (NH)	15	0.76%
Native Hawaiian or Pacific Islander alone (NH)	1	0.05%
Other race alone (NH)	3	0.15%
Mixed race or Multiracial (NH)	77	3.91%
Hispanic or Latino (any race)	131	6.66%
Total	1,968	100.00%

== Education ==
The Little Cypress-Mauriceville Consolidated Independent School District serves area students.

In 1927, the schools of Little Cypress and Gum Grove consolidated. A four-room brick school served as elementary and high schools. From 1931 to 1954, the community did not have high school classes; the high school grades were later re-established. In the late 20th century, the current consolidated school district was established.
