= Newton, Texas =

- City
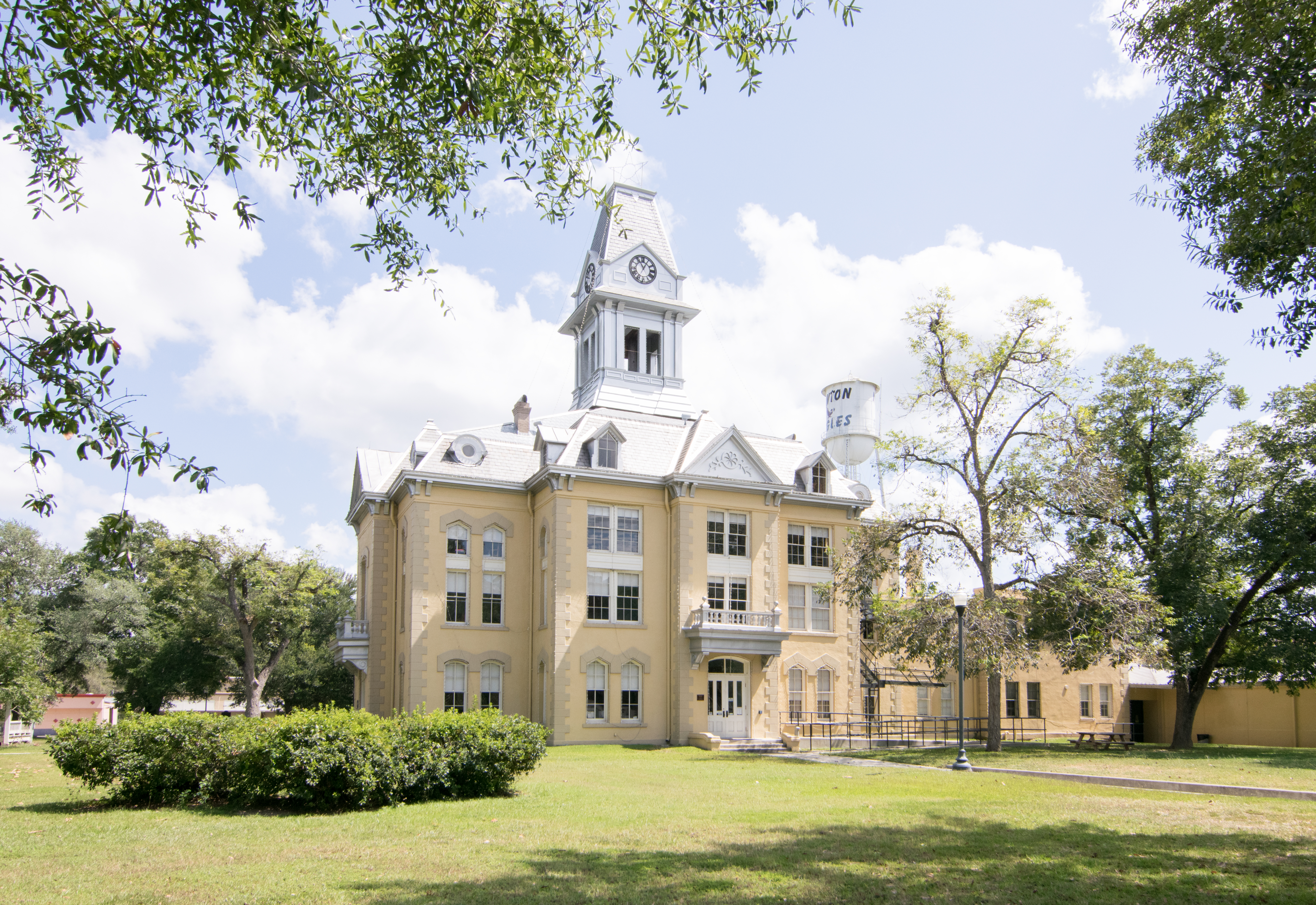
- Newton County Courthouse

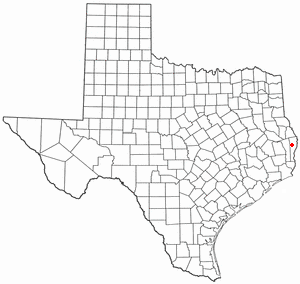
- Location of Newton, Texas

- Coordinates: 30°51′12″N 93°44′15″W
- Country: United States
- State: Texas
- County: Newton

Area
  - Total: 5.46 sq mi (14.13 km^{2})
  - Land: 5.44 sq mi (14.10 km^{2})
  - Water: 0.012 sq mi (0.03 km^{2})
- Elevation: 207 ft (63 m)

Population (2020)
  - Total: 1,633
  - Density: 435.3/sq mi (168.06/km^{2})
- Time zone: UTC-6 (Central (CST))
  - Summer (DST): UTC-5 (CDT)
- ZIP code: 75966
- Area code: 409
- FIPS code: 48-51372
- GNIS feature ID: 2411251
- Website: www.newtontexas.org

Newton is a city in and the county seat of Newton County, Texas, United States. Its population was 1,633 at the 2020 census.

== History ==
Both Newton County and its county seat, Newton, were named after John Newton, a supposed hero of the American Revolutionary War, but John Newton's heroics are said to be a product of Parson Weems, who also fictionalized the story of George Washington and the cherry tree. In 1853, disputes led to the building of a courthouse and town in the county's geographical center instead of in Burkeville, a community 11 miles north northeast of Newton. A second courthouse in Newton, a Second Empire-style structure, was built in 1902–1903 with bricks from nearby Caney Creek, according to a Texas Historical Commission marker. The town was incorporated in 1935 and remains the only incorporated city in the county. The town's public school began when the W.H. Ford Male and Female College was chartered in 1889. The site of the college later became the Powell Hotel and now serves as a museum and houses the city's chamber of commerce. The growth of the city during the first half of the 20th century was largely due to the dominant timber industry in East Texas. The town had at least one newspaper prior to 1920s.

The county courthouse, a focal point of a city square that featured extensive Christmas lighting in the early 1990s, was severely damaged by a fire in August 2000. Various funding and other problems pushed back the timeframe for the restoration of the interior for years. The historic building finally reopened in December 2012.

Although almost 80 miles from the Gulf of Mexico, Newton suffered extensive damage in September 2005 from Hurricane Rita. The National Weather Service estimated wind gusts in the vicinity of Newton to be between 80 mph and 100 mph. Some residents were without electricity for a month.

== Geography ==
According to the United States Census Bureau, the city has a total area of 5.5 square miles (14 km^{2}) [3,500 acres (1,400 ha)], of which 0.18% is covered by water.

== Demographics ==
Historical population
Census	Pop.	Note	%±
1880	68		—
1940	886		—
1950	929		4.9%
1960	1,233		32.7%
1970	1,529		24.0%
1980	1,620		6.0%
1990	1,885		16.4%
2000	2,459		30.5%
2010	2,478		0.8%
2020	1,633		−34.1%
U.S. Decennial Census

=== Racial and ethnic composition ===
Newton city, Texas – Racial and ethnic composition Note: the US Census treats Hispanic/Latino as an ethnic category. This table excludes Latinos from the racial categories and assigns them to a separate category. Hispanics/Latinos may be of any race.
Race / Ethnicity (NH = Non-Hispanic)	Pop 2000	Pop 2010	Pop 2020	% 2000	% 2010	% 2020
White alone (NH)	1,334	1,445	1,014	54.25%	58.31%	62.09%
Black or African American alone (NH)	768	872	487	31.23%	35.19%	29.82%
Native American or Alaska Native alone (NH)	2	10	10	0.08%	0.40%	0.61%
Asian alone (NH)	27	17	1	1.10%	0.69%	0.06%
Native Hawaiian or Pacific Islander alone (NH)	1	1	0	0.04%	0.04%	0.00%
Other race alone (NH)	0	0	6	0.00%	0.00%	0.37%
Mixed race or Multiracial (NH)	25	19	57	1.02%	0.77%	3.49%
Hispanic or Latino (any race)	302	114	58	12.28%	4.60%	3.55%
Total	2,459	2,478	1,633	100.00%	100.00%	100.00%

=== 2020 census ===
As of the 2020 census, Newton had a population of 1,633. The median age was 42.2 years. 25.7% of residents were under the age of 18 and 21.6% of residents were 65 years of age or older. For every 100 females there were 83.1 males, and for every 100 females age 18 and over there were 79.4 males age 18 and over.

0.0% of residents lived in urban areas, while 100.0% lived in rural areas.

There were 654 households in Newton, of which 33.6% had children under the age of 18 living in them. Of all households, 37.2% were married-couple households, 19.4% were households with a male householder and no spouse or partner present, and 39.9% were households with a female householder and no spouse or partner present. About 34.4% of all households were made up of individuals and 18.5% had someone living alone who was 65 years of age or older.

There were 780 housing units, of which 16.2% were vacant. The homeowner vacancy rate was 2.5% and the rental vacancy rate was 10.1%.

Racial composition as of the 2020 census
Race	Number	Percent
White	1,036	63.4%
Black or African American	497	30.4%
American Indian and Alaska Native	10	0.6%
Asian	1	0.1%
Native Hawaiian and Other Pacific Islander	0	0.0%
Some other race	18	1.1%
Two or more races	71	4.3%

=== 2000 census ===
At the 2000 census, 2,459 people, 731 households, and 508 families were living in the city. The population density was 446.9 inhabitants per square mile (172.5/km^{2}). The 900 housing units had an average density of 163.6 per square mile (63.2/km^{2}). The racial makeup of the city was 59.78% White, 31.60% African American, 0.08% Native American, 1.10% Asian, 0.04% Pacific Islander, 6.02% from other races, and 1.38% from two or more races. Hispanics or Latinos of any race were 12.28%.

Of the 731 households, 35.7% had children under 18 living with them, 49.9% were married couples living together, 16.8% had a female householder with no husband present, and 30.5% were not families. About 28.9% of households were one person and 13.7% were one person 65 or older. The average household size was 2.54 and the average family size was 3.12.

The age distribution was 23.9% under 18, 13.8% from 18 to 24, 31.4% from 25 to 44, 17.7% from 45 to 64, and 13.1% 65 or older. The median age was 33 years. For every 100 females, there were 129.4 males. For every 100 females 18 and over, there were 138.3 males.

The median income for a household was $26,667 and for a family was $31,250. Males had a median income of $28,571 versus $18,542 for females. The per capita income for the city was $11,416. About 25.0% of families and 27.4% of the population were below the poverty line, including 35.1% of those under 18 and 17.6% of those 65 or over.

== Education ==
The City of Newton is served by the Newton Independent School District and home to the Newton High School Eagles.

== Climate ==
The climate in this area is characterized by hot, humid summers and generally mild to cool winters. According to the Köppen climate classification, Newton has a humid subtropical climate, Cfa on climate maps.

== Notable people ==
- Sam Forse Collins Democratic member in the Texas House of Representatives from 1959 to 1964.
- Todd Gilbert, speaker of the Virginia House of Delegates (2022–2024)
- James Gulley (born 1965), professional basketball player in the Israeli Basketball Premier League
