= Newton County, Texas =

County in Texas, United States

- County
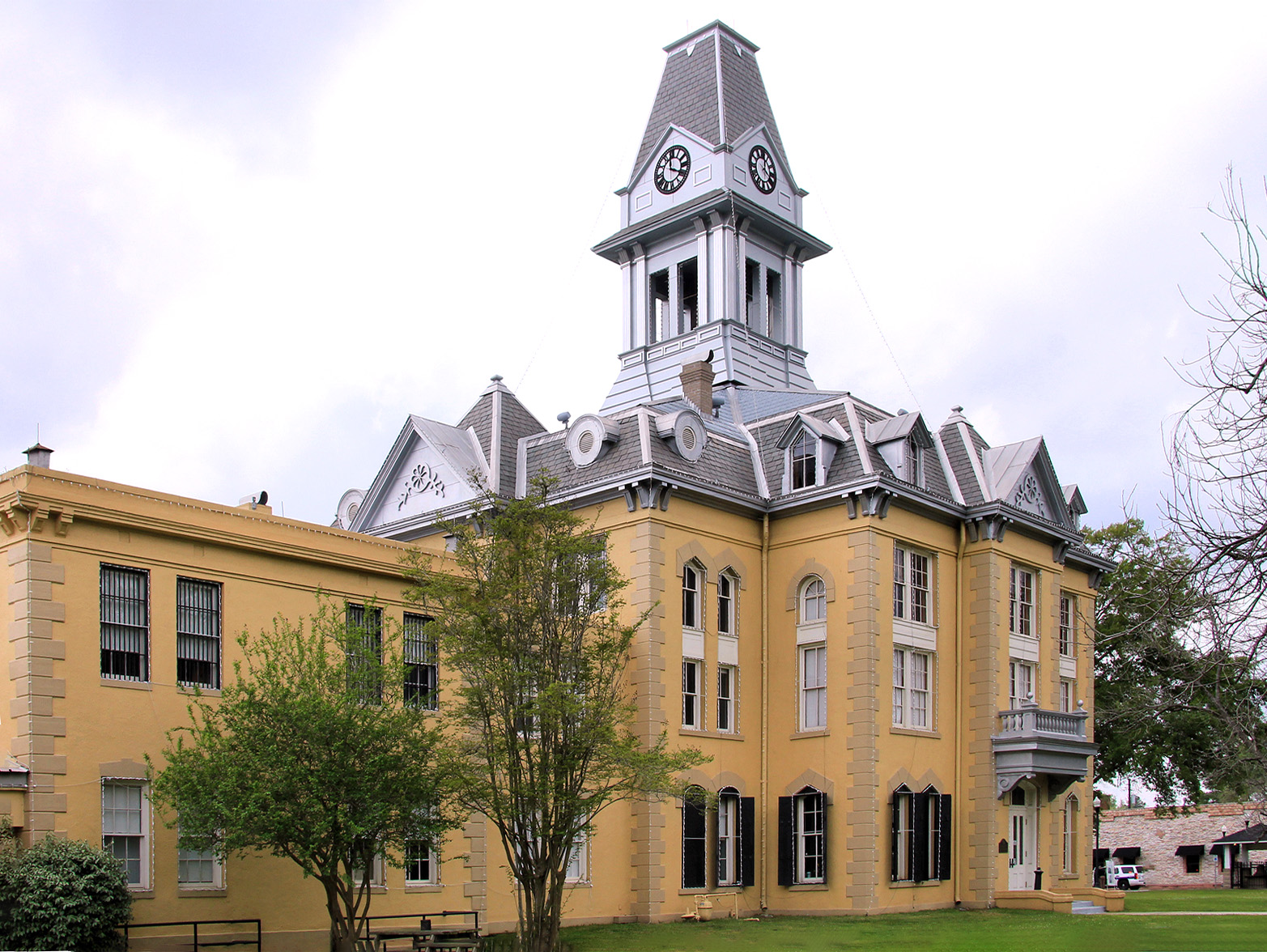
- The Newton County Courthouse

- Location within the U.S. state of Texas
- Coordinates: 30°47′N 93°45′W
- Country: United States
- State: Texas
- Founded: 1846
- Named for: John Newton
- Seat: Newton
- Largest city: Newton

Area
  - Total: 940 sq mi (2,400 km^{2})
  - Land: 934 sq mi (2,420 km^{2})
  - Water: 6.1 sq mi (16 km^{2}) 0.6%

Population (2020)
  - Total: 12,217
  - Estimate (2025): 11,954 ▼
  - Density: 13.1/sq mi (5.05/km^{2})
- Time zone: UTC−6 (Central)
  - Summer (DST): UTC−5 (CDT)
- Congressional district: 36th
- Website: www.co.newton.tx.us

Newton County is the easternmost county in the U.S. state of Texas. As of the 2020 census, its population was 12,217. Its county seat is Newton. The county is named for John Newton, a veteran of the American Revolutionary War.

Newton County is included in the Beaumont–Port Arthur metropolitan area.

As of 2000, it had the second-lowest population density for all counties in East Texas, behind only Red River County, and the lowest population density in Deep East Texas.

== Geography ==
According to the U.S. Census Bureau, the county has a total area of 940 sq mi (2,400 km^{2}), of which 6.1 sq mi (16 km^{2}) (0.6%) is covered by water.

=== Major highways ===
- U.S. Highway 190
- State Highway 12
- State Highway 62
- State Highway 63
- State Highway 87
- Loop 505
- Spur 135
- Spur 272
- Recreational Road 255

=== Adjacent counties and parishes ===
- Sabine County (north)
- Sabine Parish, Louisiana (northeast)
- Vernon Parish, Louisiana (northeast)
- Beauregard Parish, Louisiana (east)
- Calcasieu Parish, Louisiana (southeast)
- Orange County (south)
- Jasper County (west)

== Demographics ==
Historical population
Census	Pop.	Note	%±
1850	1,689		—
1860	3,119		84.7%
1870	2,187		−29.9%
1880	4,350		98.9%
1890	4,650		6.9%
1900	7,282		56.6%
1910	10,850		49.0%
1920	12,196		12.4%
1930	12,524		2.7%
1940	13,700		9.4%
1950	10,832		−20.9%
1960	10,372		−4.2%
1970	11,657		12.4%
1980	13,254		13.7%
1990	13,569		2.4%
2000	15,072		11.1%
2010	14,445		−4.2%
2020	12,217		−15.4%
2025 (est.)	11,954	▼	−2.2%
U.S. Decennial Census; 1850–2010 2010–2020

=== 2020 census ===
As of the 2020 census, the county had a population of 12,217 and a median age of 46.5 years; 20.8% of residents were under 18 and 22.4% were 65 years of age or older.

For every 100 females there were 97.5 males, and for every 100 females age 18 and over there were 96.6 males age 18 and over.

There were 4,979 households in the county, of which 26.4% had children under the age of 18 living in them; 48.4% of households were married-couple households, 21.1% were households with a male householder and no spouse or partner present, and 26.6% were households with a female householder and no spouse or partner present. About 28.8% of all households were made up of individuals and 14.6% had someone living alone who was 65 years of age or older.

The racial makeup of the county was 76.7% White, 17.1% Black or African American, 0.5% American Indian and Alaska Native, 0.2% Asian, <0.1% Native Hawaiian and Pacific Islander, 0.9% from some other race, and 4.6% from two or more races. Hispanic or Latino residents of any race comprised 2.8% of the population.

There were 6,376 housing units, of which 21.9% were vacant. Among occupied housing units, 86.4% were owner-occupied and 13.6% were renter-occupied; the homeowner vacancy rate was 1.6% and the rental vacancy rate was 7.9%. Less than 0.1% of residents lived in urban areas, while 100.0% lived in rural areas.

=== Racial and ethnic composition ===
Newton County, Texas – Racial and ethnic composition Note: the US Census treats Hispanic/Latino as an ethnic category. This table excludes Latinos from the racial categories and assigns them to a separate category. Hispanics/Latinos may be of any race.
Race / Ethnicity (NH = Non-Hispanic)	Pop 1980	Pop 1990	Pop 2000	Pop 2010	Pop 2020	% 1980	% 1990	% 2000	% 2010	% 2020
White alone (NH)	9,974	10,329	11,157	10,825	9,249	75.25%	76.12%	74.02%	74.94%	75.71%
Black or African American alone (NH)	3,152	3,027	3,100	2,891	2,075	23.78%	22.31%	20.57%	20.01%	16.98%
Native American or Alaska Native alone (NH)	6	43	78	77	59	0.05%	0.32%	0.52%	0.53%	0.48%
Asian alone (NH)	8	11	39	62	24	0.06%	0.08%	0.26%	0.43%	0.20%
Native Hawaiian or Pacific Islander alone (NH)	x	x	5	1	0	x	x	0.03%	0.01%	0.00%
Other race alone (NH)	5	6	2	0	27	0.04%	0.04%	0.01%	0.00%	0.22%
Mixed race or Multiracial (NH)	x	x	120	186	439	x	x	0.80%	1.29%	3.59%
Hispanic or Latino (any race)	109	153	571	403	344	0.82%	1.13%	3.79%	2.79%	2.82%
Total	13,254	13,569	15,072	14,445	12,217	100.00%	100.00%	100.00%	100.00%	100.00%

=== 2000 census ===
As of the 2000 census, 15,072 people, 5,583 households, and 4,092 families resided in the county. The population density was 16 people per square mile (6.2 people/km^{2}). The 7,331 housing units averaged 8 units per square mile (3.1/km^{2}). The racial makeup of the county was 75.84% White, 20.69% Black, 0.63% Native American, 0.27% Asian, 0.03% Pacific Islander, 1.56% from other races, and 0.98% from two or more races. About 3.79% of the population was Hispanic or Latino of any race.

Of the 5,583 households, 32.3% had children under 18 living with them, 58.1% were married couples living together, 11.5% had a female householder with no husband present, and 26.7% were not families; 24.1% of all households were made up of individuals, and 10.5% had someone living alone who was 65 or older. The average household size was 2.59 and the average family size was 3.07.

In the county, the population was distributed as 26.2% under 18, 9.0% from 18 to 24, 26.6% from 25 to 44, 24.1% from 45 to 64, and 14.2% who were 65 or older. The median age was 37 years. For every 100 females, there were 104.10 males. For every 100 females 18 and over, there were 102.80 males.

The median income for a household in the county was $28,500 and for a family was $34,345. Males had a median income of $31,294 versus $17,738 for females. The per capita income for the county was $13,381. About 15.5% of families and 19.1% of the population were below the poverty line, including 24.4% of those under 18 and 17.3% of those 65 or over.

== Politics ==
=== United States Congress ===
Senators	Name	Party	First Elected	Level
Senate Class 1	John Cornyn	Republican	2002	Senior Senator
Senate Class 2	Ted Cruz	Republican	2012	Junior Senator
Representatives	Name	Party	First Elected	Area(s) of Newton County Represented
District 36	Brian Babin	Republican	New district created with 2010 census. First elected 2014.	Entire county

=== Political culture ===
Newton County was once one of the most Democratic-leaning counties in East Texas and the Deep South altogether. Until 1968, the county had voted for the Democratic candidate in every election since Texas first participated in 1848 (excluding the 1860, 1864 and 1868 elections when the state had seceded). Even when Republicans Herbert Hoover and Dwight D. Eisenhower carried Texas in 1928, 1952, and 1956, respectively, Newton County remained Democratic, usually by wide margins.

The Democratic streak in Newton County was ended in 1968 when American Independent Party candidate George Wallace narrowly won the county with 42.6% of the vote against Democrat Hubert Humphrey's 41.7%. President Richard Nixon in 1972 became the first Republican to ever win the county in an election with 54% of the vote against Democrat George McGovern's 45.4%. After 1972, the county returned to voting Democratic, surviving the landslide elections of Republicans Ronald Reagan and George H. W. Bush in 1980, 1984, and 1988, respectively. In fact, Newton County was Walter Mondale's strongest county in East Texas in the 1984 election, winning 60.6% of the vote, and one of only four in the region to vote for him. Michael Dukakis in 1988 remains the last Democratic presidential candidate to win over 60% of the vote in the county.

Since 1988, the Democratic percentage in Newton County has decreased in every election, culminating in Al Gore's narrow win in 2000 with 50.16% against Governor George W. Bush's 48.56%. As of 2024, Gore remains the last Democrat to win the county's votes in a presidential election. Since 2004, the Republican candidate has comfortably carried the county in every election, with Bush winning 55.42% in 2004, John McCain winning 65.51% in 2008, Mitt Romney winning 70.06% in 2012 and Donald Trump winning 77.48%, 80.11%, and 83.16% in 2016, 2020, and 2024 respectively.

United States presidential election results for Newton County, Texas
Year	Republican		Democratic		Third party(ies)	
Year	No.	%	No.	%	No.	%
1912	11	3.12%	278	78.75%	64	18.13%
1916	34	6.09%	493	88.35%	31	5.56%
1920	58	8.68%	420	62.87%	190	28.44%
1924	145	15.30%	782	82.49%	21	2.22%
1928	397	41.27%	564	58.63%	1	0.10%
1932	46	2.81%	1,586	97.00%	3	0.18%
1936	93	7.71%	1,111	92.12%	2	0.17%
1940	174	8.22%	1,940	91.68%	2	0.09%
1944	187	15.28%	910	74.35%	127	10.38%
1948	110	7.86%	957	68.41%	332	23.73%
1952	917	35.99%	1,630	63.97%	1	0.04%
1956	1,030	49.61%	1,037	49.95%	9	0.43%
1960	756	29.19%	1,815	70.08%	19	0.73%
1964	738	24.97%	2,211	74.82%	6	0.20%
1968	555	15.67%	1,476	41.68%	1,510	42.64%
1972	1,946	53.98%	1,636	45.38%	23	0.64%
1976	1,011	22.46%	3,468	77.03%	23	0.51%
1980	1,379	29.25%	3,284	69.66%	51	1.08%
1984	2,123	39.03%	3,296	60.60%	20	0.37%
1988	1,659	31.25%	3,640	68.56%	10	0.19%
1992	1,212	22.00%	3,249	58.99%	1,047	19.01%
1996	1,409	31.62%	2,554	57.32%	493	11.06%
2000	2,423	48.56%	2,503	50.16%	64	1.28%
2004	3,159	55.42%	2,513	44.09%	28	0.49%
2008	3,446	65.51%	1,751	33.29%	63	1.20%
2012	4,112	70.06%	1,677	28.57%	80	1.36%
2016	4,288	77.48%	1,156	20.89%	90	1.63%
2020	4,882	80.11%	1,173	19.25%	39	0.64%
2024	4,781	83.16%	952	16.56%	16	0.28%

United States Senate election results for Newton County, Texas1
Year	Republican		Democratic		Third party(ies)	
Year	No.	%	No.	%	No.	%
2024	4,650	81.71%	972	17.08%	69	1.21%

United States Senate election results for Newton County, Texas2
Year	Republican		Democratic		Third party(ies)	
Year	No.	%	No.	%	No.	%
2020	4,784	79.51%	1,163	19.33%	70	1.16%

Texas Gubernatorial election results for Newton County
Year	Republican		Democratic		Third party(ies)	
Year	No.	%	No.	%	No.	%
2022	3,660	83.70%	689	15.76%	24	0.55%

== Communities ==
=== City ===
- Newton (county seat)

=== Unincorporated areas ===
==== Census-designated places ====
- Deweyville
- South Toledo Bend

==== Unincorporated communities ====
- Adsul
- Biloxi
- Bon Wier
- Burkeville
- Call
- Mayflower
- Trotti
- Wiergate

=== Ghost towns ===
- Belgrade
- Princeton
- Shankleville

== Education ==
School districts:

- Brookeland Independent School District
- Burkeville Independent School District
- Deweyville Independent School District
- Kirbyville Consolidated Independent School District
- Newton Independent School District

Areas of Newton County in Brookeland ISD, Burkeville ISD, and Newton ISD are assigned to Angelina College. Legislation does not specify a community college for the remainder of the county.

== See also ==
- National Register of Historic Places listings in Newton County, Texas
- Recorded Texas Historic Landmarks in Newton County
