= Mauriceville, Texas =

- CDP
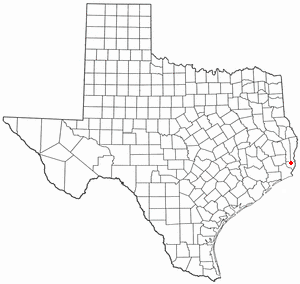
- Location of Mauriceville, Texas

- Coordinates: 30°13′17″N 93°52′12″W
- Country: United States
- State: Texas
- County: Orange

Area
  - Total: 8.5 sq mi (22.0 km^{2})
  - Land: 8.5 sq mi (22.0 km^{2})
  - Water: 0 sq mi (0.0 km^{2})
- Elevation: 30 ft (9.1 m)

Population (2020)
  - Total: 2,983
  - Density: 351/sq mi (136/km^{2})
- Time zone: UTC-6 (Central (CST))
  - Summer (DST): UTC-5 (CDT)
- ZIP code: 77626
- Area code: 409
- FIPS code: 48-47100
- GNIS feature ID: 2408189

Mauriceville is a census-designated place (CDP) in Orange County, Texas, United States. The population was 2,983 at the 2020 census. It is part of the Beaumont–Port Arthur Metropolitan Statistical Area.

== Historical development ==
The site was established when the two lines known as Texarkana and Fort Smith Railway and the Orange and Northwestern Railway were built in 1898 and 1902 respectively. This community was named for Maurice Miller, the son of the Orange and Northwestern's first president. The post office was opened in 1906, and initially, the lumber industry would be the primary center of the local economy. With the local timber supply becoming diminished, other resources such as rice and dairy farming would become the area's economic focus.

== Geography ==
According to the United States Census Bureau, the CDP has a total area of 8.5 square miles (22 km^{2}), all land.

=== Climate ===
The climate in this area is characterized by hot, humid summers and generally mild to cool winters. According to the Köppen Climate Classification system, Mauriceville has a humid subtropical climate, abbreviated "Cfa" on climate maps.

== Demographics ==
Historical population
Census	Pop.	Note	%±
1990	2,046		—
2000	2,743		34.1%
2010	3,252		18.6%
2020	2,983		−8.3%
U.S. Decennial Census; 1850–1900 1910; 1920 1930 1940; 1950 1960 1970; 1980 1990 2000; 2010

Mauriceville first appeared as a census designated place in the 1990 U.S. census.

=== 2020 census ===
Mauriceville CDP, Texas – Racial and ethnic composition Note: the US Census treats Hispanic/Latino as an ethnic category. This table excludes Latinos from the racial categories and assigns them to a separate category. Hispanics/Latinos may be of any race.
Race / Ethnicity (NH = Non-Hispanic)	Pop 2000	Pop 2010	Pop 2020	% 2000	% 2010	% 2020
White alone (NH)	2,541	2,914	2,514	92.64%	89.61%	84.28%
Black or African American alone (NH)	10	19	16	0.36%	0.58%	0.54%
Native American or Alaska Native alone (NH)	12	8	13	0.44%	0.25%	0.44%
Asian alone (NH)	2	1	24	0.07%	0.03%	0.80%
Native Hawaiian or Pacific Islander alone (NH)	0	3	0	0.00%	0.09%	0.00%
Other race alone (NH)	0	1	3	0.00%	0.03%	0.10%
Mixed race or Multiracial (NH)	17	37	136	0.62%	1.14%	4.56%
Hispanic or Latino (any race)	161	269	277	5.87%	8.27%	9.29%
Total	2,743	3,252	2,983	100.00%	100.00%	100.00%

As of the 2020 United States census, there were 2,983 people, 1,043 households, and 865 families residing in the CDP.

As of the census of 2000, there were 2,743 people, 939 households, and 754 families residing in the CDP. The population density was 322.4 inhabitants per square mile (124.5/km^{2}). There were 1,021 housing units at an average density of 120.0 per square mile (46.3/km^{2}). The racial makeup of the CDP was 95.44% White, 0.36% African American, 0.66% Native American, 0.07% Asian, 2.52% from other races, and 0.95% from two or more races. Hispanic or Latino of any race were 5.87% of the population.

There were 939 households, out of which 44.1% had children under the age of 18 living with them, 67.0% were married couples living together, 8.7% had a female householder with no husband present, and 19.7% were non-families. 16.2% of all households were made up of individuals, and 6.4% had someone living alone who was 65 years of age or older. The average household size was 2.92 and the average family size was 3.27.

In the CDP, the population was spread out, with 31.4% under the age of 18, 7.9% from 18 to 24, 32.4% from 25 to 44, 21.2% from 45 to 64, and 7.1% who were 65 years of age or older. The median age was 32 years. For every 100 females, there were 107.6 males. For every 100 females age 18 and over, there were 104.2 males.

The median income for a household in the CDP was $52,500, and the median income for a family was $56,422. Males had a median income of $40,608 versus $24,554 for females. The per capita income for the CDP was $18,388. About 7.3% of families and 10.6% of the population were below the poverty line, including 17.5% of those under age 18 and none of those age 65 or over.

== Culture ==
The Texas state legislature designated Mauriceville as the "Crawfish Capital of Texas" in 1983. The previous year, the town's budding crawfish farming industry had been profiled by the New York Times. The town holds an annual Crawfish Festival each April.

== Education ==
Mauriceville is served by the Little Cypress-Mauriceville Consolidated Independent School District.

== Notable person ==
- James Douglas Latham, a spree killer from Mauriceville.
