= Bon Wier, Texas =

Unincorporated community in Texas, US

Location of Bon Wier within the state of Texas. Bon Wier is located just 1.5 miles (2.4 km) west of the Texas–Louisiana border.

Bon Wier (/bɒn ˈwɪər/ bon WEER) is an unincorporated community in eastern Newton County, Texas, United States, and is located along U.S. Route 190. The ZIP Code for Bon Wier is 75928.

== Historical development ==
Established in 1905, the town was a stop on the Jasper and Eastern Railroad which was primarily a line servicing the lumber industry. The town's name was derived from the last name of two key men who were associated with the Kirby Lumber Company, owned by John Henry Kirby. B. F. Bonner was the sawmill manager, and Robert Withrow Wier was the town surgeon. The town was established to take advantage of the timber of the region as part of the company expansion. A post office opened for the town in 1906. Logging camps would operate in the vicinity intermittently from 1918 until 1935. In 1948, the railway was acquired by the Gulf, Colorado and Santa Fe Railway. Sawmills were the key businesses for the town as late as the 1990s.

== Climate ==
The climate in this area is characterized by hot, humid summers and generally mild to cool winters. According to the Köppen Climate Classification system, Bon Wier has a humid subtropical climate, abbreviated "Cfa" on climate maps.
