= Farm to Market Road 1 =

State road in Sabine and San Augustine counties in Texas, United States

Farm to Market Road 1
- FM 1, highlighted in red

Route information
- Maintained by TxDOT
- Length: 18.640 mi (29.998 km)
- Existed: 1941–present

Major junctions
- South end: US 96 in Pineland
- SH 184 in Bronson; SH 103 in Rosevine
- North end: SH 21 in Fords Corner

Location
- Country: United States
- State: Texas
- Counties: Sabine, San Augustine

Highway system
- Highways in Texas; Interstate; US; State; Former; Toll; Loops; Spurs; FM/RM; Park; Rec
← Loop 1	→ RR 1

Farm to Market Road 1 (FM 1) is a Farm to Market Road (a state-maintained road connecting rural and agricultural areas to market towns) in the U.S. state of Texas, maintained by the Texas Department of Transportation (TxDOT). FM 1 was the first such to be designated in Texas. This 18.6-mile (29.9 km) road provides access from rural areas of East Texas to U.S. Highway 96 (US 96).

== Route description ==
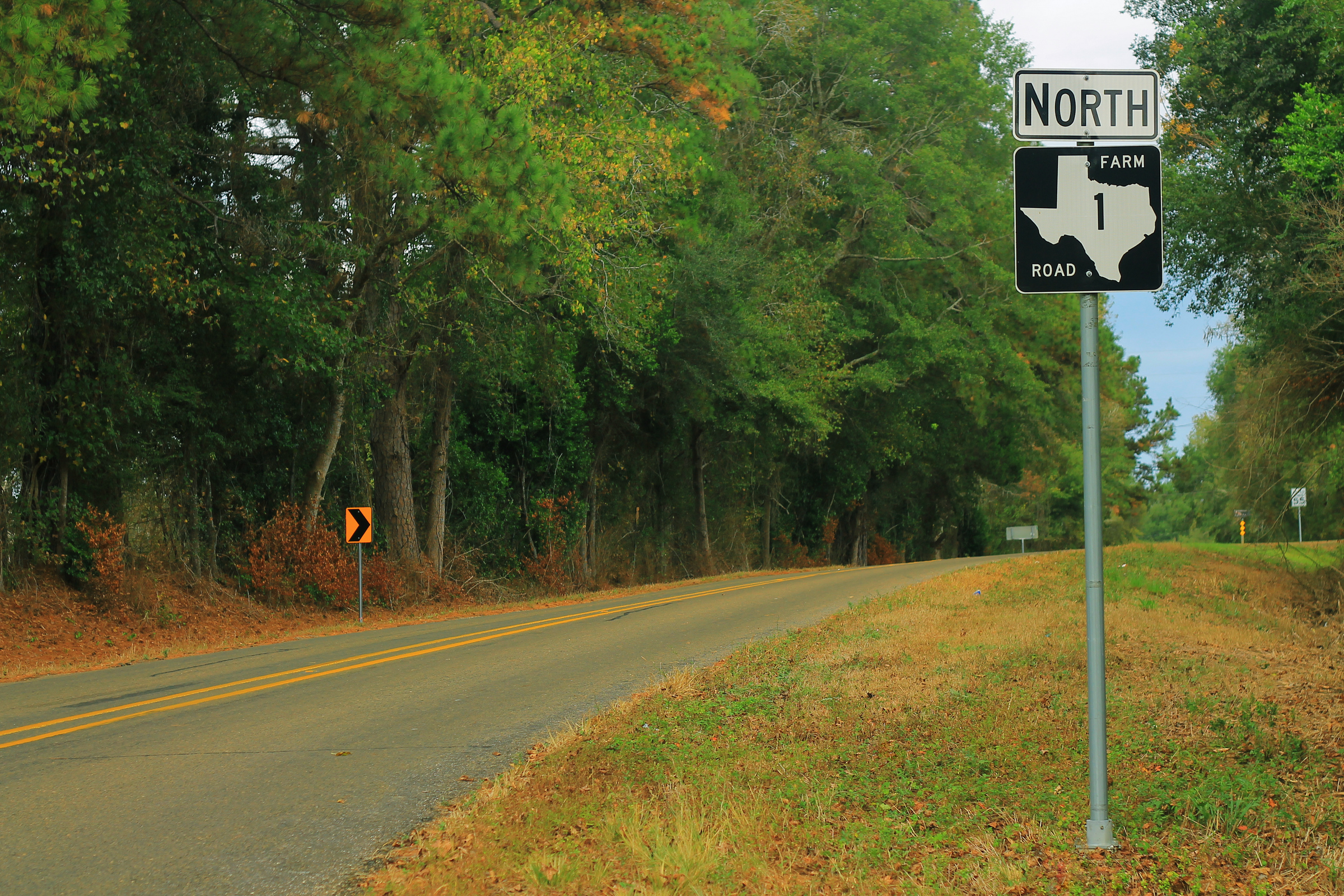
FM 1 near Rosevine, November 2016

FM 1 begins in southwestern Sabine County near Pineland at a junction with US 96. In Pineland, FM 1 is known as Temple Avenue and travels eastward and then northward through the town. North of Pineland, the road's name changes to Magasco Drive as it travels northward to the town of Magasco. Just south of Magasco, FM 1 Spur diverges from the main route and travels on the west side of the BNSF Railway tracks, while FM 1 crosses the tracks and runs to the east of them.

FM 1 continues northward through Sabine County and then turns to a more northwesterly route after its junction with FM 2024. FM 1 is known as North Temple Road as it enters the town of Bronson. A short break occurs in the road as it intersects SH 184 in Bronson. FM 1 resumes at a point farther north on SH 184 and heads north as Bronson Road.

FM 1 heads north from Bronson until it intersects with SH 103 west of Rosevine. At this point another break in the road occurs. FM 1 begins again at a point farther east along SH 103. The road heads to the northeast and is known as Rosevine Road. The road changes course to the north-northwest after a junction with FM 1592. FM 1 leaves Sabine County northwest of Rosevine and enters the northeastern portion of San Augustine County. FM 1 continues north until it terminates at SH 21 at Fords Corner.

== History ==
FM 1 was designated on April 23, 1941, and was the first Farm to Market Road to be so designated in Texas. Connecting a sawmill owned by Temple Lumber Company to US 96 and obviating the need to use the Pendelton Ferry, it had been designated shortly after being upgraded from a dirt road to a paved road at the request of Temple and two gas companies. Throughout its history, the road has predominantly served the logging industry.

FM 1 ran from Pineland northward to Magasco from its inception in 1941 to October 13, 1954, when it was rerouted to end at Texas State Highway 184 (SH 184). Its old route became a spur connection to Magasco, signed as FM Spur 1. FM 1776 was also cancelled and combined with FM 1.

== Major intersections ==
County	Location	mi	km	Destinations	Notes
Sabine	Pineland	0.0	0.0	US 96 – San Augustine, Jasper	Southern terminus
Sabine	Pineland	0.7	1.1	FM 2426 east – Sabine National Forest	
Sabine	Pineland	1.1	1.8	FM 83 west (Timberland Highway) – Sam Rayburn Reservoir	Southern terminus of concurrency with FM 83
Sabine	Pineland	1.5	2.4	FM 83 east – Hemphill	Northern terminus of concurrency with FM 83
Sabine		2.7	4.3	FM Spur 1 north (Magasco Road) – Magasco	
Sabine		5.8	9.3	FM 2024 east	
Sabine	Bronson	8.8	14.2	SH 184 west (Benton Street)	Southern terminus of concurrency with SH 184
Sabine	Bronson	9.0	14.5	SH 184 east – Hemphill	Northern terminus of concurrency with SH 184
Sabine	Rosevine	13.6	21.9	SH 103 west / FM 3229 north (Loggins Road) – Sam Rayburn Reservoir	Western terminus of concurrency with SH 103, southern terminus of FM 3229
Sabine	Rosevine	14.1	22.7	SH 103 east – Sabine National Forest	Eastern terminus of concurrency with SH 103
Sabine	Rosevine	15.1	24.3	FM 1592 south (Gravehill Road)	Northern terminus of FM 1592
Sabine		16.7	26.9	CR 151 north – Tebo Ranch	Southern terminus of CR 151
San Augustine	Fords Corner	19.3	31.1	SH 21 – San Augustine, Sabine National Forest	Northern terminus
1.000 mi = 1.609 km; 1.000 km = 0.621 mi: Concurrency terminus

== See also ==
- List of Farm to Market Roads in Texas
