= List of Farm to Market Roads in Texas (1500–1599) =

- Texas Farm to Market Road and Ranch to Market Road markers

Highway names
- Interstates: Interstate Highway X (IH-X, I-X)
- US Highways: U.S. Highway X (US X)
- State: State Highway X (SH X)
- Loops: Loop X
- Spurs: Spur X
- Recreational: Recreational Road X (RE X)
- Farm or Ranch to Market Roads: Farm to Market Road X (FM X); Ranch to Market Road X (RM X)
- Park Roads: Park Road X (PR X)

System links
- Highways in Texas; Interstate; US; State; Former; Toll; Loops; Spurs; FM/RM; Park; Rec

Farm to Market Roads in Texas are owned and maintained by the Texas Department of Transportation (TxDOT).

== FM 1500 ==
Farm to Market Road 1500
- Location: Lamar County
- Length: 6.950 mi (Note: The certified length given is shorter than the actual mileage, as the TxDOT description of FM 1500 considers it to be discontinuous at rather than concurrent with FM 1499.) (11.185 km)
- Existed: August 25, 1949–present

Farm to Market Road 1500 (FM 1500) is located in Lamar County.

FM 1500 begins at an intersection with FM 79 northwest of Paris. The highway travels in a northern direction through rural areas and has an overlap with FM 1499 near the Emberson area. After the overlap, FM 1500 continues to run in a northern direction and starts to see more development along its route as it nears Pat Mayse Lake. State maintenance for the highway ends at the entrance for the Lamar Point Campground.

FM 1500 was designated on August 25, 1949, running from FM 1499 southward to FM 79 at a distance of 2.6 miles (4.2 km). The highway was extended 4.5 miles (7.2 km) northward on May 7, 1970, creating an overlap with FM 1499 in the process.

Junction list

The entire route is in Lamar County.

Location	mi	km	Destinations	Notes
	0.0	0.0	FM 79 – Sumner, Paris	
	2.5	4.0	FM 1499 west – Emberson	South end of FM 1500 overlap
	3.0	4.8	FM 1499 east to US 271	North end of FM 1499 overlap
	7.4	11.9	Lamar Point Campground	
1.000 mi = 1.609 km; 1.000 km = 0.621 mi: Concurrency terminus

== FM 1501 ==
Farm to Market Road 1501
- Location: Lamar County
- Length: 4.160 mi (6.695 km)
- Existed: August 25, 1949–present

Farm to Market Road 1501 (FM 1501) is located in Lamar County. It runs from FM 196 near the community of Milton east to FM 1503 in Deport. A spur connection of approximately 0.6 miles (0.97 km) provides access to Milton.

FM 1501 was designated on August 25, 1949, along the current route.

== FM 1502 ==
Farm to Market Road 1502
- Location: Lamar County
- Length: 12.192 mi (19.621 km)
- Existed: August 25, 1949–present

Farm to Market Road 1502 (FM 1502) is located in Lamar County.

== FM 1503 ==
Farm to Market Road 1503
- Location: Lamar County
- Length: 7.833 mi (12.606 km)
- Existed: August 25, 1949–present

Farm to Market Road 1503 (FM 1503) is located in Lamar County. It runs from US 271 in Deport south and west to FM 196 in Minter.

FM 1503 was designated on August 25, 1949, along the current route.

== FM 1504 ==
Farm to Market Road 1504
- Location: Van Zandt County
- Length: 7.318 mi (11.777 km)
- Existed: September 29, 1949–present

Farm to Market Road 1504 (FM 1504) is located in Van Zandt County.

== FM 1505 ==
Farm to Market Road 1505
- Location: El Paso County
- Length: 0.796 mi (1,281 m)
- Existed: September 28, 1949–May 24, 2018

Farm to Market Road 1505 (FM 1505) was located in El Paso County. No highway currently uses the FM 1505 designation.

FM 1505 was designated on September 28, 1949, from SH 20 (was US 80 before its rerouting off of this road; and its future truncation) to Trowbridge Drive. FM 1505 was also called Clark Drive. FM 1505 was decommissioned on May 24, 2018, and given to the city of El Paso.

== FM 1506 ==
Farm to Market Road 1506
- Location: Lamar County
- Length: 6.911 mi (11.122 km)
- Existed: August 25, 1949–present

Farm to Market Road 1506 (FM 1506) is located in Lamar County.

== FM 1507 ==
Farm to Market Road 1507
- Location: Lamar County
- Length: 3.452 mi (5.555 km)
- Existed: August 25, 1949–present

Farm to Market Road 1507 (FM 1507) is located in Lamar County.

The road, located within the city of Paris, passes near the Love Civic Center, which also houses the Red River Valley Veterans Memorial and the city's Eiffel Tower replica.

== FM 1508 ==
Farm to Market Road 1508
- Location: Lamar County
- Length: 2.770 mi (4.458 km)
- Existed: August 25, 1949–present

Farm to Market Road 1508 (FM 1508) is located in Lamar County.

== FM 1509 ==
Farm to Market Road 1509
- Location: Lamar County
- Length: 5.607 mi (9.024 km)
- Existed: August 25, 1949–present

Farm to Market Road 1509 (FM 1509) is located in Lamar County.

== FM 1510 ==
Farm to Market Road 1510
- Location: Lamar County
- Length: 4.326 mi (6.962 km)
- Existed: August 25, 1949–present

Farm to Market Road 1510 (FM 1510) is located in Lamar County.

== FM 1511 ==
Farm to Market Road 1511
- Location: Leon County
- Length: 9.837 mi (15.831 km)
- Existed: August 25, 1949–present

Farm to Market Road 1511 (FM 1511) is located in Leon County.

== FM 1512 ==
Farm to Market Road 1512
- Location: Leon County
- Length: 13.471 mi (21.679 km)
- Existed: August 25, 1949–present

Farm to Market Road 1512 (FM 1512) is located in Leon County.

== FM 1513 ==
Farm to Market Road 1513
- Location: Rusk County
- Length: 3.324 mi (5.349 km)
- Existed: August 25, 1949–present

Farm to Market Road 1513 (FM 1513) is located in Rusk County.

== FM 1514 ==
Farm to Market Road 1514
- Location: San Jacinto County
- Length: 9.837 mi (15.831 km)
- Existed: August 25, 1949–present

Farm to Market Road 1514 (FM 1514) is located in San Jacinto County.

== FM 1515 ==
Farm to Market Road 1515
- Location: Denton County
- Length: 2.122 mi (3.415 km)
- Existed: December 17, 1952–present

Farm to Market Road 1515 (FM 1515) is located in Denton County. Its western terminus is at the entrance to Denton Enterprise Airport. Its eastern terminus is at I-35E near the campus of the University of North Texas. The road is known locally as Airport Road and Bonnie Brae Street.

FM 1515 was designated on December 17, 1952 (numbered January 16, 1953), from the truck route of US 77 (now I-35E) west to the airport. On June 30, 1995, the road was transferred to Urban Road 1515 (UR 1515). The designation reverted to FM 1515 with the elimination of the Urban Road system on November 15, 2018.

Junction list

The entire route is in Denton, Denton County.

mi	km	Destinations	Notes
0.0	0.0	Airport Road – Denton Enterprise Airport	
1.7	2.7	I-35W south – Fort Worth	I-35W exit 84
2.1	3.4	I-35 north / I-35E south – Gainesville, Dallas	I-35E exit 467; I-35 exit 468
1.000 mi = 1.609 km; 1.000 km = 0.621 mi

=== FM 1515 (1949) ===
Farm to Market Road 1515
- Location: Victoria County
- Existed: August 25, 1949–January 16, 1953

A previous route numbered FM 1515 was designated in Victoria County on August 25, 1949, from US 59, 2 miles (3.2 km) west of Victoria, northwest via Garfield School and Mission Valley to the DeWitt County line. FM 1515 was cancelled on January 16, 1953, and transferred to FM 236.

== FM 1516 ==
Farm to Market Road 1516
- Location: Bexar County
- Length: 9.838 mi (15.833 km)
- Existed: September 28, 1949–present

Farm to Market Road 1516 (FM 1516) is located in Bexar County. It runs from US 87 in China Grove to FM 1976 in Converse.

FM 1516 begins at an intersection with US 87 in China Grove, running through the town along Real Road. The highway exits China Grove before intersecting FM 1346 in Martinez. Just north of Martinez, FM 1516 briefly enters the city limits of San Antonio, where it meets I-10/US 90/SH 130. The highway enters Converse, intersecting FM 78 and Seguin Road (formerly FM 3502) before ending at an intersection with FM 1976.

FM 1516 was designated on September 28, 1949, from FM 78 near Converse southward 7.3 miles (11.7 km) to China Grove School. On October 13, 1954, the road was extended south 1.9 miles (3.1 km) to US 87. On March 12, 1963, the road was extended north 0.2 miles (0.32 km) over the old location of FM 78. On May 22, 1979, the road was extended north to the FM 1976 spur connection. On December 30, 1988, a 0.2-mile (0.32 km) section from FM 1516 southwest and northwest to FM 1976 was added, replacing a section of the FM 1976 spur connection (the remainder was renumbered FM 3502). On June 27, 1995, the section from FM 1976 to I-10 was transferred to Urban Road 1516 (UR 1516). The designation of this section reverted to FM 1516 with the elimination of the Urban Road system on November 15, 2018. On April 30, 2020, FM 1516 was rerouted onto a new road (Hilltop Avenue extension) from Seguin Road to FM 1976, while the old route on Gibbs Sprawl and Toepperwein Road was given to the city of Converse (along with FM 3502).

Junction list

The entire route is in Bexar County.

Location	mi	km	Destinations	Notes
China Grove	0.0	0.0	US 87 – La Vernia, San Antonio	
Martinez	2.3	3.7	FM 1346	
San Antonio	5.3	8.5	I-10 / US 90 / SH 130	I-10 exit 585
Converse	9.0	14.5	FM 78 (John E. Peterson Boulevard)	
Converse	9.7	15.6	FM 3502 east (Seguin Road)	
Converse	9.9	15.9	FM 1976 (Gibbs Sprawl Road) to I-35 – Windcrest, San Antonio	
1.000 mi = 1.609 km; 1.000 km = 0.621 mi

== FM 1517 ==
Farm to Market Road 1517
- Location: Bexar County
- Length: 1.868 mi (3.006 km)
- Existed: September 28, 1949–December 18, 2014

Farm to Market Road 1517 (FM 1517) was located in Bexar County, running along Eckhert Road from 1949 to 2014.

The western terminus of FM 1517 was at an intersection with SH 16 (Bandera Road) in San Antonio, at the northern city limits of Leon Valley. The route traveled along Eckhert Road in a northeasterly direction, passing John Marshall High School before turning due east and ending at an intersection with Huebner Road. While the Eckhert Road name extended beyond both given termini, only the indicated portion was designated FM 1517.

The routing of FM 1517 was designated in 1949. It was redesignated as Urban Road 1517 (UR 1517) on June 27, 1995. The designation was canceled on December 18, 2014, and control was returned to the city of San Antonio as part of TxDOT's San Antonio turnback program, which gave 21.8 miles of roads to the city.

== FM 1518 ==
Farm to Market Road 1518
- Location: Bexar and Guadalupe counties
- Length: 16.615 mi (26.739 km)
- Existed: September 28, 1949–present

Farm to Market Road 1518 (FM 1518) is located in the Greater San Antonio area.

The southern terminus of FM 1518 is at a junction with Loop 1604 in the southeastern Bexar County town of Adkins. It continues north through the town of St. Hedwig and crosses Interstate 10 (I-10) at its exit 591. The route then passes to the east of Randolph Air Force Base before reaching FM 78 near Schertz, just west of the Guadalupe County line. Officially, FM 1518 is discontinuous here, and the route designation resumes at another point farther east along FM 78. Now in Guadalupe County, FM 1518 travels through the southwestern portion of Schertz and into Selma, where it ends at an intersection with I-35's exit 174A.

FM 1518 was designated on September 28, 1949, as a short route that connected unincorporated southern Bexar county communities 3.4 miles (5.5 km) southeast of SH 346 to SH 346 (which would ultimately become part of SH 16). On December 17, 1952, FM 1518 was extended 3.2 miles (5.1 km) west to a road intersection. On April 21, 1953, the route was extended west 1.1 miles (1.8 km) to Somerset. On May 25, 1953, the road was extended 8.3 miles (13.4 km) to US 81 (now SH 132), replacing FM 1749. On November 21, 1956, FM 1518 was extended east to FM 1937. On August 8, 1958, FM 1518 was extended east to US 81(now I-35), replacing the section of FM 1937 from its current end to US 87. FM 1518 also replaced FM 1316 from US 90 to FM 78 and FM 1621 from FM 78 to US 81. On June 28, 1963, FM 1518 was extended west to FM 471, creating a route of approximately 66.5 miles (107.0 km) that looped around the southwestern, southern, and eastern portions of the greater San Antonio area. On August 23, 1973, the section of FM 1518 from FM 471 to what is now Loop 1604 (then FM 2173) was renumbered as FM 2790 and the section from there to SH 16 became a portion of FM 1604 (now Loop 1604). On June 30, 1977, the section of FM 1518 from there to the current junction with Loop 1604 was transferred to Loop 1604. At that same time, FM 1604 was canceled and redesignated as Loop 1604, shortening FM 1518 to its current route. In 1995, the northern portion of FM 1518, from I-35 to FM 78 was officially redesignated as Urban Road 1518 (UR 1518); the designation reverted to FM 1518 with the elimination of the Urban Road system on November 15, 2018.

Junction list

County	Location	mi	km	Destinations	Notes
Bexar	Adkins	0.0	0.0	Loop 1604 (Anderson Loop)	
Bexar	St. Hedwig	2.6	4.2	FM 1346 (St. Hedwig Road)	
Bexar	San Antonio	7.2	11.6	I-10 / US 90 (SH 130) – San Antonio, Seguin	I-10 exit 591
Bexar	Schertz	12.7	20.4	FM 78 west – Universal City	South end of FM 78 overlap
Guadalupe	Schertz	13.0	20.9	FM 78 east (John E. Peterson Boulevard) – Seguin	North end of FM 78 overlap
Guadalupe	Selma	16.7	26.9	I-35 – San Antonio, New Braunfels	I-35 exit 174A
1.000 mi = 1.609 km; 1.000 km = 0.621 mi

== FM 1519 ==
Farm to Market Road 1519
- Location: Camp and Franklin counties
- Length: 12.714 mi (20.461 km)
- Existed: September 28, 1949–present

Farm to Market Road 1519 (FM 1519) is located in Camp and Franklin counties. It runs from FM 556 southwest of Pittsburg to FM 1448.

FM 1519 was designated on September 28, 1949, from FM 556 southwest of Pittsburg west to SH 11 at Leesburg. On October 9, 1961, the road was extended to FM 1448, replacing FM 2680 and creating a concurrency with SH 11.

== FM 1520 ==
Farm to Market Road 1520
- Location: Camp County
- Length: 6.973 mi (11.222 km)
- Existed: September 28, 1949–present

Farm to Market Road 1520 (FM 1520) is located in Camp County.

== FM 1521 ==
Farm to Market Road 1521
- Location: Camp County
- Length: 2.925 mi (4.707 km)
- Existed: September 28, 1949–present

Farm to Market Road 1521 (FM 1521) is located in Camp County.

== FM 1522 ==
Farm to Market Road 1522
- Location: Camp County
- Length: 0.935 mi (1,505 m)
- Existed: September 28, 1949–present

Farm to Market Road 1522 (FM 1522) is located in Camp County.

== FM 1523 ==
Farm to Market Road 1523
- Location: Culberson County
- Length: 7.976 mi (12.836 km)
- Existed: November 20, 1951–present

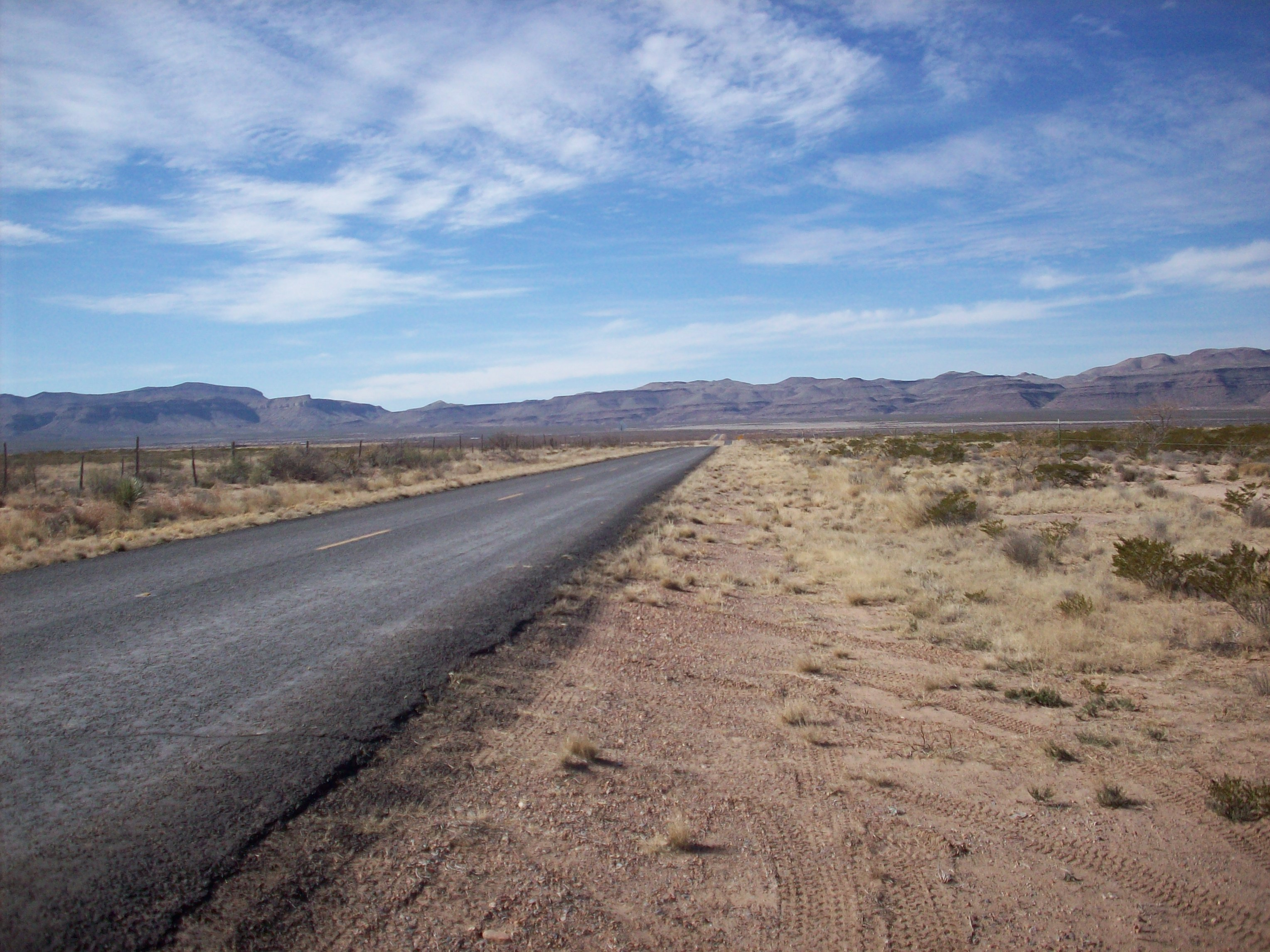
Westward view along FM 1523 with the Sierra Vieja in the background

Farm to Market Road 1523 (FM 1523) is a 8-mile-long (13 km) route in Culberson County. Its southern terminus is at a junction with US 90, near the abandoned community of Lobo. The route travels west to an intersection with FM 2017, which begins to the south while FM 1523 turns to the north. The route ends at another junction with US 90.

=== FM 1523 (1949) ===
Farm to Market Road 1523
- Location: Camp County
- Existed: September 28, 1949–December 18, 1951

A previous route numbered FM 1523 was designated on September 28, 1949, from SH 11 at Newsome south to a road intersection. FM 1523 was eliminated on December 18, 1951, due to lack of funding.

== FM 1524 ==
Farm to Market Road 1524
- Location: Castro County
- Length: 17.155 mi (27.608 km)
- Existed: September 28, 1949–present

Farm to Market Road 1524 (FM 1524) is located in Castro County.

== FM 1525 ==
Farm to Market Road 1525
- Location: Crosby County
- Length: 5.629 mi (9.059 km)
- Existed: September 28, 1949–present

Farm to Market Road 1525 (FM 1525) is located in Crosby County.

== RM 1526 ==
Ranch to Market Road 1526
- Location: Hutchinson County
- Length: 3.094 mi (4.979 km)
- Existed: October 31, 1958–present

Ranch to Market Road 1526 (RM 1526) is located in Hutchinson County. Its western terminus is at SH 136/SH 207 (former SH 15) in Stinnett. It runs to the east along Broadway and leaves the city limits before state maintenance ends near the ghost town of Plemons. The roadway continues as CR Q.

RM 1526 was designated on October 31, 1958, on the current route.

=== FM 1526 (1949) ===
Farm to Market Road 1526
- Location: Crosby County
- Existed: September 28, 1949–December 29, 1949

The first use of the FM 1526 designation was in Crosby County, from an intersection with FM 378, 2 miles (3.2 km) north of Robertson, west to the Lubbock County line. FM 1526 was cancelled on December 29, 1949, and became part of FM 40.

=== FM 1526 (1957) ===
Farm to Market Road 1526
- Location: Floyd County
- Existed: October 31, 1957–March 18, 1958

The second use of the FM 1526 designation was in Floyd County, from FM 2301 west to the Hale County line. FM 1526 was cancelled on March 18, 1958, and transferred to FM 2286.

== FM 1527 ==
Farm to Market Road 1527
- Location: Crosby County
- Length: 4.176 mi (6.721 km)
- Existed: September 28, 1949–present

Farm to Market Road 1527 (FM 1527) is located in Crosby County.

== FM 1528 ==
Farm to Market Road 1528
- Location: Delta County
- Length: 11.415 mi (18.371 km)
- Existed: 1949–present

Farm to Market Road 1528 (FM 1528) is located in the western and central portions of Delta County. The highway is approximately 11.4 miles (18.3 km) in length, and travels through mainly rural portions of Delta County. The roadway begins at an intersection with FM 64 in the community of Antioch. The highway proceeds southward, passing through the former community of Gough, before bending east. The highway proceeds east, running concurrently with SH 24 for a short distance. The road travels northeast, parallel to Cooper Lake, before bending north and entering Cooper, where it terminates at SH 154.

Early roads existed in the place of FM 1528 by 1936, and a short section of highway between SH 24 and Klondike was designated as Spur 39 on September 26, 1939, and FM 1528 was designated on September 28, 1949, replacing Spur 39. The route of the highway has been altered since its designation, including rerouting due to the construction of Cooper Lake.

== FM 1529 ==
Farm to Market Road 1529
- Location: Delta County
- Length: 5.525 mi (8.892 km)
- Existed: September 28, 1949–present

Farm to Market Road 1529 (FM 1529) is located in Delta County.

== FM 1530 ==
Farm to Market Road 1530
- Location: Delta County
- Length: 8.650 mi (13.921 km)
- Existed: September 28, 1949–present

Farm to Market Road 1530 (FM 1530) is located in Delta County.

== FM 1531 ==
Farm to Market Road 1531
- Location: Delta County
- Length: 4.168 mi (6.708 km)
- Existed: September 28, 1949–present

Farm to Market Road 1531 (FM 1531) is located in Delta County.

== FM 1532 ==
Farm to Market Road 1532
- Location: Hunt and Delta counties
- Length: 7.707 mi (12.403 km)
- Existed: September 26, 1949–present

Farm to Market Road 1532 (FM 1532) is located in Hunt and Delta counties.

== FM 1533 ==
Farm to Market Road 1533
- Location: Delta County
- Length: 3.686 mi (5.932 km)
- Existed: September 28, 1949–present

Farm to Market Road 1533 (FM 1533) is located in Delta County.

== FM 1534 ==
Farm to Market Road 1534
- Location: Hill County
- Length: 4.609 mi (7.417 km)
- Existed: April 16, 1984–present

Farm to Market Road 1534 (FM 1534) is located in Hill County, It runs from FM 933, 3 miles (4.8 km) southeast of Whitney, northeast to FM 1947.

FM 1534 was designated on April 16, 1984, on the current route.

=== FM 1534 (1949) ===
Farm to Market Road 1534
- Location: DeWitt County
- Existed: September 28, 1949–September 28, 1950

The first use of the FM 1534 designation was in DeWitt County, from SH 119 3 miles (4.8 km) north of Yorktown, northwest 5.6 miles (9.0 km) via Gohlke School Road towards Nopal to a road intersection. FM 1534 was cancelled 12 months later and became a portion of FM 108.

=== FM 1534 (1958) ===
Farm to Market Road 1534
- Location: Hale County
- Existed: October 31, 1958–October 7, 1960

The second use of the FM 1534 designation was in Hale County, from SH 194 at Edmonson north to the Swisher County line. FM 1534 was cancelled on October 7, 1960, and transferred to FM 2355. On October 10, 1961, FM 2355 was cancelled and transferred to FM 1424.

=== RM 1534 ===
Ranch to Market Road 1534
- Location: Kimble County
- Existed: June 1, 1964–December 8, 1981

The third use of the FM 1534 designation was as RM 1534 in Kimble County, from US 290, 9.7 miles (15.6 km) northwest of the Kerr County line, east 5 miles (8.0 km). RM 1534 was cancelled on December 8, 1981, and became a portion of RM 479.

== FM 1535 ==
Farm to Market Road 1535
- Location: Bexar County
- Length: 8.192 mi (13.184 km)
- Existed: October 15, 1955–present

Farm to Market Road 1535 (FM 1535) is a 8.2-mile-long (13.2 km) route in Bexar County. It is known in Greater San Antonio as Northwest Military Highway.

FM 1535 begins at Interstate 410 in Castle Hills. The route travels north through north central San Antonio, crossing Wurzbach Parkway, and passes through Shavano Park before reentering San Antonio at its junction with Loop 1604. FM 1535 ends at the San Antonio city limits, at the entrance to the Camp Bullis Military Training Reservation.

FM 1535 was designated on October 15, 1955. Its designation was officially changed to Urban Road 1535 (UR 1535) on June 27, 1995. In 2003, the route was designated the Second Indian Head Division Memorial Highway, in honor of the 2nd Infantry Division of the U.S. Army. The designation reverted to FM 1535 with the elimination of the Urban Road system on November 15, 2018. The sections of FM 1535 from Lockhill-Selma Road (at the Castle Hills city limit boundary) to the Shavano Park city limit boundary and from Loop 1604 to the Camp Bullis were proposed for decommissioning (one section of FM 1535 would have been renumbered) in 2014 as part of TxDOT's San Antonio turnback proposal, which would have relinquished jurisdiction of over 129 miles of roads to the city of San Antonio; however, the city rejected that proposal.

Junction list

The entire route is in Bexar County.

Location	mi	km	Destinations	Notes
Castle Hills	0.0	0.0	I-410 (Connally Loop)	Southern terminus
San Antonio	2.9	4.7	Wurzbach Parkway (PA 1502)	
San Antonio	6.3	10.1	Loop 1604 (Anderson Loop)	
San Antonio	8.2	13.2	Camp Bullis	Northern terminus
1.000 mi = 1.609 km; 1.000 km = 0.621 mi

=== FM 1535 (1949) ===
Farm to Market Road 1535
- Location: Freestone County
- Existed: September 28, 1949–April 13, 1955

A previous route numbered FM 1535 was designated in Freestone County on September 28, 1949, from FM 80 south of Teague west and south to a road intersection. This route was cancelled on April 13, 1955, due to lack of funding.

== FM 1536 ==
Farm to Market Road 1536
- Location: Hopkins County
- Length: 7.487 mi (12.049 km)
- Existed: September 28, 1949–present

Farm to Market Road 1536 (FM 1536) is located in Hopkins County.

== FM 1537 ==
Farm to Market Road 1537
- Location: Hopkins County
- Length: 5.836 mi (9.392 km)
- Existed: September 28, 1949–present

Farm to Market Road 1537 (FM 1537) is located in Hopkins County.

== FM 1538 ==
Farm to Market Road 1538
- Location: Jim Wells County
- Length: 8.722 mi (14.037 km)
- Existed: September 28, 1949–present

Farm to Market Road 1538 (FM 1538) is located in Jim Wells County.

== FM 1539 ==
Farm to Market Road 1539
- Location: Jim Wells County
- Length: 4.358 mi (7.014 km)
- Existed: September 28, 1949–present

Farm to Market Road 1539 (FM 1539) is located in Jim Wells County.

== FM 1540 ==
Farm to Market Road 1540
- Location: Jim Wells County
- Length: 8.999 mi (14.482 km)
- Existed: September 28, 1949–present

Farm to Market Road 1540 (FM 1540) is located in Jim Wells County.

== FM 1541 ==
Farm to Market Road 1541
- Location: Randall County
- Length: 16.308 mi (26.245 km)
- Existed: September 28, 1949–present

Farm to Market Road 1541 (FM 1541) is located in Randall County.

FM 1541 begins at I-27 and Cemetery Road near Canyon. The highway travels north and intersects SH 217 and FM 3331 just east of Canyon. FM 1541 runs in a generally north direction through Randall County, passing near several subdivisions. The highway has an interchange at Loop 335 before entering the city limits of Amarillo near SW 58th Street. FM 1541 is known locally as Washington Street in the city and runs through a heavily developed area before ending at I-27/US 60/US 87.

FM 1541 was first designated on September 28, 1949, running southward 7.4 miles (11.9 km) from US 60/US 87 to road intersection. On December 18, 1951, the highway was extended further south to SH 217 near Canyon. On November 29, 1957, FM 1541 was extended further south to FM 285, absorbing FM 2390 in the process. A year later, the highway was extended southward again to the Randall-Swisher county line at what is now FM 1075. On February 14, 1991, FM 1541's southern terminus was truncated to I-27 southeast of Canyon with a spur connection to SH 217 being added. On June 27, 1995, the section from Loop 335 to I-27/US 60/US 87 was redesignated Urban Road 1541 (UR 1541). The designation reverted to FM 1541 with the elimination of the Urban Road system on November 15, 2018.

Junction list

The entire route is in Randall County.

Location	mi	km	Destinations	Notes
	0.0	0.0	I-27 / Cemetery Road – Lubbock	I-27 exit 103
	2.9	4.7	SH 217 – Canyon, West Texas A&M University, Palo Duro Canyon State Park	
	3.9	6.3	FM 3331 west – Canyon	
	10.4	16.7	FM 1151 east – Lake Tanglewood, Claude	
	12.3	19.8	Loop 335 (Hollywood Road)	Interchange
Amarillo	16.3	26.2	I-27 / US 60 / US 87 (Canyon Expressway)	I-27 exit 652A
1.000 mi = 1.609 km; 1.000 km = 0.621 mi

== FM 1542 ==
Farm to Market Road 1542
- Location: Parker and Tarrant counties
- Length: 4.918 mi (7.915 km)
- Existed: September 28, 1949–present

Farm to Market Road 1542 (FM 1542) is located in Parker and Tarrant counties.

== FM 1543 ==
Farm to Market Road 1543
- Location: Hood County
- Length: 1.415 mi (2.277 km)
- Existed: September 28, 1949–present

Farm to Market Road 1543 (FM 1543) is located in Hood County.

== FM 1544 ==
Farm to Market Road 1544
- Location: Nolan County
- Length: 16.308 mi (26.245 km)
- Existed: September 26, 1979–present

Farm to Market Road 1544 (FM 1544) is located in Nolan County. It runs from FM 419 in Sweetwater west and south to Business I-20 (formerly Loop 432).

FM 1544 was designated on September 26, 1979, on the current route.

=== FM 1544 (1949) ===
Farm to Market Road 1544
- Location: Parker County
- Existed: September 28, 1949–February 6, 1953

The first route numbered FM 1544 was designated in Parker County on September 28, 1949, from US 180 north to Garner. FM 1544 was cancelled on February 6, 1953, and transferred to FM 113.

=== FM 1544 (1952) ===
Farm to Market Road 1544
- Location: Yoakum County
- Existed: December 17, 1952–October 15, 1976

The second route numbered FM 1544 was designated in Yoakum County on December 17, 1952 (numbered February 6, 1953), from FM 396 (now FM 213), 1 mile (1.6 km) west of the Terry County line, south to FM 1939. On May 7, 1974, the road was extended 5 miles (8.0 km) north from FM 213 to a point south of US 82/US 380. On May 25, 1976, the road was extended north 4 miles (6.4 km) to US 82/US 380. FM 1544 was cancelled on September 15, 1976, and became a portion of FM 1780.

== FM 1545 ==
Farm to Market Road 1545
- Location: Live Oak County
- Length: 6.308 mi (10.152 km)
- Existed: May 6, 1964–present

Farm to Market Road 1545 (FM 1545) is located in Live Oak County. It runs from SH 72, 3 miles (4.8 km) west of US 281 in Three Rivers, southeast, southwest and north to SH 72.

FM 1545 was designated on May 6, 1964, from SH 72, 3 miles (4.8 km) west of US 281 in Three Rivers, southeast and southwest 5.4 miles (8.7 km). On October 26, 1983, the road was extended north 1 mile (1.6 km) to SH 72.

=== FM 1545 (1949) ===
Farm to Market Road 1545
- Location: Parker County
- Existed: September 28, 1949–August 1, 1963

A previous route numbered FM 1545 was designated on September 28, 1949, from US 80 (now I-20) south 3.0 miles (4.8 km) to Anneta. FM 1545 was cancelled on August 1, 1963, and transferred to FM 5.

== FM 1546 ==
Farm to Market Road 1546
- Location: Kleberg County
- Length: 3.812 mi (6.135 km)
- Existed: July 14, 1949–present

Farm to Market Road 1546 (FM 1546) is located in Kleberg County.

== FM 1547 ==
Farm to Market Road 1547
- Location: Wheeler, Collingsworth, and Hall counties
- Length: 43.128 mi (69.408 km)
- Existed: November 11, 1949–present

Farm to Market Road 1547 (FM 1547) is located in Wheeler, Collingsworth and Hall counties.

== FM 1548 ==
Farm to Market Road 1548
- Location: Collingsworth County
- Length: 2.510 mi (4.039 km)
- Existed: November 11, 1949–present

Farm to Market Road 1548 (FM 1548) is located in Collingsworth County.

== FM 1549 ==
Farm to Market Road 1549
- Location: Atascosa and Frio counties
- Length: 12.485 mi (20.093 km)
- Existed: October 26, 1949–present

Farm to Market Road 1549 (FM 1549) is located in Atascosa and Frio counties.

== FM 1550 ==
Farm to Market Road 1550
- Location: Fannin County
- Length: 16.259 mi (26.166 km)
- Existed: October 26, 1949–present

Farm to Market Road 1550 (FM 1550) is located in Fannin County.

== FM 1551 ==
Farm to Market Road 1551
- Location: Hutchinson County
- Length: 3.265 mi (5.255 km)
- Existed: May 23, 1951–present

Farm to Market Road 1551 (FM 1551) is located in Hutchinson County.

=== FM 1551 (1949) ===
Farm to Market Road 1551
- Location: Fannin County
- Existed: October 26, 1949–November 30, 1949

A previous route numbered FM 1551 was designated in Fannin County on October 26, 1949, from SH 78 to the Hunt County line. This route was cancelled on November 30 of that year and became a portion of FM 816.

== FM 1552 ==
Farm to Market Road 1552
- Location: Fannin County
- Length: 2.438 mi (3.924 km)
- Existed: 1949–present

Farm to Market Road 1552 (FM 1552) is located in Fannin County. From its western terminus at SH 78 north of Bailey, the route runs east and then north for approximately 2.4 miles (3.9 km) to the site of the former 3-P school. The roadway continues as CR 3710.

FM 1552 was designated on October 26, 1949, along the current route.

== FM 1553 ==
Farm to Market Road 1553
- Location: Fannin County
- Length: 8.363 mi (13.459 km)
- Existed: 1949–present

Farm to Market Road 1553 (FM 1553) is located in Fannin County.

== FM 1554 ==
Farm to Market Road 1554
- Location: Jim Wells County
- Length: 5.794 mi (9.325 km)
- Existed: 1949–present

Farm to Market Road 1554 (FM 1554) is located in Jim Wells County.

== RM 1555 ==
Ranch to Market Road 1555
- Location: Upton and Reagan counties
- Length: 20.522 mi (33.027 km)
- Existed: October 26, 1949 (Note: RM 1555 was originally designated as FM 1555 from 1949 to 1960.)–present

Ranch to Market Road 1555 (RM 1555) is located in Upton and Reagan counties.

RM 1555 begins at an intersection with SH 349 north of Rankin. The highway runs in a slight northeast direction through rural areas of Upton County, passing the Atlas Pipeline. RM 1555 intersects RM 2594 before entering Reagan County. At the Upton–Reagan county line, the highway turns at a nearly 90-degree angle and begins to run in a southeast direction. South of Jackson Lane, RM 1555 travels in a southward direction to its terminus at US 67 near Texon.

RM 1555 was designated on October 26, 1949, as Farm to Market Road 1555 (FM 1555) and ran northwest from US 67 to the Upton–Reagan county line. On December 17, 1952, the highway was extended approximately 10.6 miles (17.1 km) to the west to SH 349. The designation was changed to RM 1555 on January 16, 1960.

== FM 1556 ==
Farm to Market Road 1556
- Location: Dimmit County
- Length: 2.543 mi (4.093 km)
- Existed: 1949–present

Farm to Market Road 1556 (FM 1556) is located in Dimmit County.

== FM 1557 ==
Farm to Market Road 1557
- Location: Dimmit County
- Length: 8.76 mi (14.10 km)
- Existed: 1949–present

Farm to Market Road 1557 (FM 1557) is located in Dimmit County.

== FM 1558 ==
Farm to Market Road 1558
- Location: Dimmit County
- Length: 1.459 mi (2.348 km)
- Existed: November 9, 1949–present

Farm to Market Road 1558 (FM 1558) is located in Dimmit County. It runs southeastward from FM 1019 in the community of Valley Wells for approximately 1.5 miles (2.4 km) before state maintenance ends. The roadway continues as the unimproved Valley Wells Road, which connects to FM 468 northwest of Cotulla.

FM 1558 was designated on November 9, 1949, along the current route.

== FM 1559 ==
Farm to Market Road 1559
- Location: Hutchinson County
- Length: 5.305 mi (8.538 km)
- Existed: May 23, 1951–present

Farm to Market Road 1559 (FM 1559) is located in Hutchinson County.

=== FM 1559 (1946) ===
Farm to Market Road 1559
- Location: Orange County
- Existed: December 10, 1946–January 16, 1950

A previous route numbered FM 1559 was designated on December 10, 1946, from Orange north 4.5 miles (7.2 km) to Lemonville Road. This was formerly a section of SH 87 before it was rerouted east over FM 407. FM 1559 was cancelled on January 16, 1950, and became a portion of FM 1130.

== FM 1560 ==
Farm to Market Road 1560
- Location: Bexar County
- Length: 7.343 mi (Note: The certified length given is shorter than the actual mileage as the TxDOT description of FM 1560 considers to be discontinuous at rather than concurrent with SH 16 in Helotes.) (11.817 km)
- Existed: September 21, 1955–present

Farm to Market Road 1560 (FM 1560) is located in the Greater San Antonio area. The highway runs from FM 471 in extreme west San Antonio to Loop 1604 near the main campus of UTSA.

FM 1560 begins at an intersection with FM 471 in western San Antonio, near Loop 1604. The highway runs through rural areas of Bexar County to SH 16 in Helotes. The two highways share a short wrong-way concurrency. After leaving SH 16, FM 1560, now signed as Hausman Road, travels through the northern part of Helotes, passing by many subdivisions. The highway turns to the east, before ending at Loop 1604, near UTSA.

The current FM 1560 was designated on September 21, 1955, and the highway originally ran from FM 471 northward and eastward to a county road in Bexar County; the eastern terminus would be designated as part of FM 1604 on 1959 and renumbered Loop 1604 in 1977. On December 18, 2014, the section from Loop 1604 west to Helotes city limit was proposed for removal from the state highway system as part of TxDOT's San Antonio turnback program, which gave 21.8 miles (35.1 km) of roads to the city. This proposal was rescinded on August 30, 2022.

The intersections with SH 16 in Helotes are currently being upgraded as that highway is being converted into a superstreet.

Junction list

The entire route is in Bexar County.

Location	mi	km	Destinations	Notes
San Antonio	0.0	0.0	FM 471 (Culebra Road) / Alamo Parkway – Castroville	Southern terminus of FM 1560; continues south as Alamo Parkway
Helotes	5.3	8.5	SH 16 north (Bandera Road) – Bandera	South end of SH 16 overlap
Helotes	5.7	9.2	SH 16 south (Bandera Road) – Leon Valley, San Antonio	North end of SH 16 overlap
San Antonio	7.7	12.4	Loop 1604 (Anderson Loop) / Hausman Road	Northern terminus of FM 1560; continues east as Hausman Road
1.000 mi = 1.609 km; 1.000 km = 0.621 mi: Concurrency terminus

=== FM 1560 (1949) ===
Farm to Market Road 1560
- Location: Fannin County
- Existed: November 30, 1949–October 15, 1954

A previous route numbered FM 1560 was designated on November 30, 1949, from SH 34 to FM 824. FM 1560 was cancelled on October 15, 1954, and became a portion of FM 1550.

== FM 1561 ==
Farm to Market Road 1561
- Location: Cameron County
- Length: 4.279 mi (6.886 km)
- Existed: June 1, 1965–present

Farm to Market Road 1561 (FM 1561) is located in Cameron County. It runs from SH 345, 3 miles (4.8 km) south of FM 106, east to FM 803.

FM 1561 was designated on June 1, 1965, on the current route.

=== FM 1561 (1949) ===
Farm to Market Road 1561
- Location: Starr and Hidalgo counties
- Existed: November 30, 1949–February 15, 1958

The first route numbered FM 1561 was designated in Hidalgo County on November 30, 1949, from FM 681 at McCook west to the Starr County line. On November 20, 1951, the road was extended westward into Starr County by 14.5 miles (23.3 km) to FM 755. FM 1561 was cancelled on February 15, 1958, and transferred to FM 490.

=== FM 1561 (1958) ===
Farm to Market Road 1561
- Location: Brazoria and Galveston counties
- Existed: October 31, 1958–October 15, 1964

The second route numbered FM 1561 was designated in Brazoria County on October 31, 1958, from FM 523 at Stratton Ridge northeast 5.8 miles (9.3 km). On January 1, 1960, the road was extended northeast 2.8 miles (4.5 km) to Danbury Road. On May 30, 1961, the original routing was cancelled and FM 1561 was reassigned on a route in Brazoria and Galveston counties, from SH 288 to SH 6, replacing a section of FM 646. FM 1561 was cancelled on October 15, 1964; the section from SH 6 at Alta Loma south 3.8 miles (6.1 km) was transferred to FM 646, and the section from that point south of SH 6 to SH 288 was transferred to FM 2004.

== FM 1562 ==
Farm to Market Road 1562
- Location: Collin and Hunt counties
- Length: 7.097 mi (11.422 km)
- Existed: November 30, 1949–present

Farm to Market Road 1562 (FM 1562) is located in Collin and Hunt counties.

FM 1562 begins at an intersection with FM 981 east of Blue Ridge. The highway travels in a mostly eastern direction, intersecting FM 36, before ending at an intersection with US 69 in Celeste.

FM 1562 was designated on November 30, 1949, running from US 69 in Celeste westward to the Collin County line at a distance of 6.7 miles (10.8 km). The highway was extended 0.9 miles (1.4 km) westward to FM 981 on November 26, 1954.

== FM 1563 ==
Farm to Market Road 1563
- Location: Hunt County
- Length: 12.729 mi (20.485 km)
- Existed: November 30, 1949–present

Farm to Market Road 1563 (FM 1563) is located in Hunt County.

== FM 1564 ==
Farm to Market Road 1564
- Location: Hunt County
- Length: 11.802 mi (Note: The certified length given is shorter than the actual mileage, as the TxDOT description of FM 1564 considers it to be discontinuous at SH 34.) (18.993 km)
- Existed: November 30, 1949–present

Farm to Market Road 1564 (FM 1564) is located south of Greenville in unincorporated Hunt County.

FM 1564 begins at an intersection with FM 36, approximately 1.75 mi (2.82 km) southwest of that route's junction I-30. The route travels eastward to an intersection with SH 34, with which it shares a brief concurrency of 0.7 mi (1.1 km). After separating from SH 34 and continuing to the east, the route crosses FM 2101, which provides access to Majors Airport to the north. FM 1564 ends at a junction with US 69. FM 1564 is two lanes for its entire length, and primarily serves agricultural traffic, but it is also used by recreational traffic bound for the northern shore of Lake Tawakoni.

FM 1564 was first designated on November 30, 1949, along what is now its eastern section, from SH 34 to US 69 south of the community of Dixon. The westward extension from SH 34 to FM 36 was approved on June 2, 1967.

Junction list

The entire route is in Hunt County.

Location	mi	km	Destinations	Notes
	0.0	0.0	FM 36 – Caddo Mills	Western terminus
	4.7	7.6	SH 34 south – Quinlan	West end of SH 34 concurrency
	5.4	8.7	SH 34 north – Greenville	East end of SH 34 concurrency
	8.4	13.5	FM 2101 – Greenville, Majors Airport	
	12.5	20.1	US 69 – Greenville, Point	Eastern terminus
1.000 mi = 1.609 km; 1.000 km = 0.621 mi

== FM 1565 ==
Farm to Market Road 1565
- Location: Hunt and Kaufman counties
- Length: 16.485 mi (Note: The certified length given is shorter than the actual mileage, as the TxDOT description of FM 1565 considers it to be discontinuous at rather than concurrent with the I-30 frontage road.) (26.530 km)
- Existed: November 30, 1949–present

Farm to Market Road 1565 (FM 1565) is located in Hunt and Kaufman counties.

FM 1565 begins at an intersection with FM 986 in Poetry. The highway runs in a northwest direction before turning northeast at County Road 2452 just past the Kaufman–Hunt county line. FM 1565 turns in a more direct northern direction near SH 276, then enters Union Valley, intersecting FM 35 in the town. The highway intersects the eastbound frontage road of I-30 in the southwestern tip of Caddo Mills. FM 1567 travels along the eastbound frontage road for approximately 0.7 miles (1.1 km) then turns north, passes by the Caddo Mills Municipal Airport, then ends at an intersection with SH 66.

FM 1565 was designated in 1949, running from US 67 (now SH 66), southwest of Caddo Mills, southward to the Kaufman–Hunt county line. In 1951, the designation was extended south to FM 986 in Poetry.

Junction list

County	Location	mi	km	Destinations	Notes
Kaufman	Poetry	0.0	0.0	FM 986 – Terrell	
Hunt		7.1	11.4	SH 276 – Rockwall, Quinlan	
Hunt	Union Valley	7.8	12.6	FM 35 – Royse City, Quinlan	
Hunt	Caddo Mills	13.3	21.4	I-30 (US 67) – Dallas, Greenville	Exit 83 on I-30
Hunt	Caddo Mills	17.2	27.7	SH 66 – Royse City, Caddo Mills	
1.000 mi = 1.609 km; 1.000 km = 0.621 mi

== FM 1566 ==
Farm to Market Road 1566
- Location: Hunt County
- Length: 9.624 mi (15.488 km)
- Existed: November 30, 1949–present

Farm to Market Road 1566 (FM 1566) is located in Hunt County.

== FM 1567 ==
Farm to Market Road 1567
- Location: Hunt and Hopkins counties
- Length: 33.047 mi (Note: The certified length given is shorter than the actual mileage, as the TxDOT description of FM 1567 considers it to be discontinuous at rather than concurrent with SH 19 and SH 154.) (53.184 km)
- Existed: November 30, 1949–present

Farm to Market Road 1567 (FM 1567) is located in Hunt and Hopkins counties.

FM 1567 begins at an intersection with US 69/FM 513 in Lone Oak. The highway travels in a slight northeast direction before turning east near the city limits, then makes a sharp turn to the north near County Road 3223 before turning back in a northeast direction, then runs in a mostly eastern direction again near County Road 3215. FM 1567 travels through rural farming areas and intersects FM 275 in the unincorporated community of Miller Grove. Leaving Miller Grove, the highway continues to run through rural farm land littered with several ponds, then has a short overlap with SH 19. Leaving SH 19, FM 1567 winds its way through rural areas lined with trees before turning south at an intersection with FM 2297. The highway continues to travel in a mostly southern direction before turning back east at FM 2081. FM 1567 continues to run east, has an overlap with SH 154, then turns north at County Road 2948. The highway continues to travel in a mostly northern direction before ending at an intersection with SH 11 near Como.

FM 1567 was designated in 1948 from US 69 in Lone Oak east to the Hunt–Hopkins county line at a distance of 5.5 miles (8.9 km). In 1952, the highway was extended to Reilly Springs, absorbing FM 1597, FM 1716, and FM 1720 in the process. In 1958, FM 1567 was extended to SH 11 near Como, bringing the highway to its current route.

Junction list

County	Location	mi	km	Destinations	Notes
Hunt	Lone Oak	0.0	0.0	US 69 / FM 513 – Greenville, Emory	
Hopkins	Miller Grove	8.6	13.8	FM 275 – Cumby, Emory	
Hopkins		14.7	23.7	SH 19 south – Emory	West end of SH 19 overlap
Hopkins		15.0	24.1	SH 19 north – Sulphur Springs	East end of SH 19 overlap
Hopkins		18.0	29.0	FM 2297 north – Sulphur Springs	
Hopkins	Arbala	20.1	32.3	FM 2081 south	
Hopkins		23.5	37.8	SH 154 east – Quitman	West end of SH 154 overlap
Hopkins		24.0	38.6	SH 154 west – Sulphur Springs	East end of SH 154 overlap
Hopkins		33.8	54.4	SH 11	
1.000 mi = 1.609 km; 1.000 km = 0.621 mi: Concurrency terminus

== FM 1568 ==
Farm to Market Road 1568
- Location: Hunt County
- Length: 6.610 mi (10.638 km)
- Existed: November 30, 1949–present

Farm to Market Road 1568 (FM 1568) is located in Hunt County.

== FM 1569 ==
Farm to Market Road 1569
- Location: Hunt County
- Length: 9.115 mi (14.669 km)
- Existed: November 30, 1949–present

Farm to Market Road 1569 (FM 1569) is located in Hunt County.

== FM 1570 ==
Farm to Market Road 1570
- Location: Hunt County
- Length: 10.890 mi (Note: The certified length given is shorter than the actual length as the TxDOT description of FM 1570 considers to be discontinuous at the I-30/US 67 frontage road instead of concurrent with it.) (17.526 km)
- Existed: November 30, 1949–present

Farm to Market Road 1570 (FM 1570) is a major thoroughfare located in Hunt County, roughly along the city limits of Greenville. It is approximately 11 miles (18 km) long and is known locally as Jack Finney Boulevard.

The road has five lanes (four traffic lanes, plus a bidirectional left turn lane) for the approximately 5 miles (8.0 km) between U.S. Highway 69 (US 69) and SH 34. The road has two lanes and 12 ft (3.7 m) shoulders between SH 34 and SH 66. There are only 4 traffic signals on its entire length, making it the preferred route for Dallas/Fort Worth-bound commuters attempting to avoid local traffic within Greenville.

FM 1570 was designated on November 30, 1949, from SH 34 south of Greenville east 2 miles (3.2 km) to Majors Air Field. This route was formerly War Highway 20. On March 5, 1959, the road was extended north to US 69, replacing FM 2298. On January 15, 1963, the road was extended southwest to I-30. On August 19, 1964, the road was extended north to SH 66, replacing FM 2032. An extension from SH 66 north to US 380 signed as "Spur 1570" opened in December 2018. In addition, FM 3211 was realigned to end at the extension rather than at SH 66.

Junction list

The entire route is in Greenville, Hunt County.

mi	km	Destinations	Notes
0.0	0.0	SH 66 – Greenville, Caddo Mills	Western terminus
3.2– 3.3	5.1– 5.3	I-30 / US 67 – Sulphur Springs, Dallas	I-30/US 67 exit 89
6.0	9.7	SH 34 (Wesley Street) – Greenville, Quinlan	
7.9	12.7	FM 2101 south – Lake Tawakoni	
10.8	17.4	US 69 (Joe Ramsey Boulevard) – Celeste, Emory	
11.0	17.7	Bus. US 69 (Moulton Street) – Greenville	Eastern terminus
1.000 mi = 1.609 km; 1.000 km = 0.621 mi

== FM 1571 ==
Farm to Market Road 1571
- Location: Hunt County
- Length: 4.493 mi (7.231 km)
- Existed: November 30, 1949–present

Farm to Market Road 1571 (FM 1571) is located in Hunt County.

== FM 1572 ==
Farm to Market Road 1572
- Location: Kinney County
- Length: 16.109 mi (25.925 km)
- Existed: October 28, 1953–present

Farm to Market Road 1572 (FM 1572) is located in Kinney County.

=== FM 1572 (1949) ===
Farm to Market Road 1572
- Location: Nolan and Fisher counties
- Existed: November 30, 1949–November 4, 1953

A previous route numbered FM 1572 was designated on November 30, 1949, from US 80 in Sweetwater north 4.0 miles (6.4 km) to the Nolan–Fisher county line. The highway was extended 10.6 miles (17.1 km) miles north into Fisher County to a road intersection on May 23, 1951. FM 1572 was cancelled on November 4, 1953, and transferred to FM 419.

== FM 1573 ==
Farm to Market Road 1573
- Location: Sherman and Hansford counties
- Length: 32.332 mi (52.033 km)
- Existed: November 30, 1949–present

Farm to Market Road 1573 (FM 1573) is located in Sherman and Hansford counties.

== FM 1574 ==
Farm to Market Road 1574
- Location: Uvalde County
- Length: 0.981 mi (1,579 m)
- Existed: October 15, 1965–present

Farm to Market Road 1574 (FM 1574) is located in Uvalde County.

=== FM 1574 (1949) ===
Farm to Market Road 1574
- Location: Burleson County
- Existed: December 29, 1949–June 11, 1965

A previous route numbered FM 1574 was designated on December 29, 1949, from SH 21 northwest 4.6 miles (7.4 km) to the town of Gus. FM 1574 was cancelled on June 11, 1965, and became a portion of FM 696.

== FM 1575 ==
Farm to Market Road 1575
- Location: Cameron County
- Length: 4.013 mi (6.458 km)
- Existed: December 29, 1949–present

Farm to Market Road 1575 (FM 1575) is located in Cameron County. It begins at an intersection with SH 100 near Los Fresnos. The highway runs north through unincorporated areas of the county before entering Laureles, where it intersects FM 2893 before ending at FM 510.

FM 1575 was designated on December 29, 1949, on its current route.

== FM 1576 ==
Farm to Market Road 1576
- Location: Hudspeth County
- Length: 23.896 mi (38.457 km)
- Existed: September 18, 1957–present

Farm to Market Road 1576 (FM 1576) is a 24-mile-long (39 km) route in Hudspeth County. Its southern terminus is at US 62/US 180 near the ghost town of Salt Flat. It runs northward, intersecting FM 2249, before ending at the New Mexico state line. The roadway continues as Otero County Road G-005.

FM 1576 was designated on September 18, 1957, from the mileage of FM 2318 and a section of FM 2249. The renumbering from FM 2318 was necessary because there was already a route in Bosque County with that number. On September 27, 1960, the mileage of FM 2636 was transferred to FM 1576, extending it to US 62/US 180. On September 5, 1973, it was extended to its current northern terminus.

=== FM 1576 (1949) ===
Farm to Market Road 1576
- Location: Cameron County
- Existed: December 29, 1949–April 30, 1956

A previous route numbered FM 1576 was designated on December 29, 1949, from SH 4 northeast of Brownsville southwest 0.5 miles (0.80 km) to FM 1419. FM 1576 was cancelled on April 30, 1956, and transferred to SH 4.

== FM 1577 ==
Farm to Market Road 1577
- Location: Cameron County
- Length: 5.277 mi (8.493 km)
- Existed: December 29, 1949–present

Farm to Market Road 1577 (FM 1577) is located in Cameron County.

== FM 1578 ==
Farm to Market Road 1578
- Location: Navarro County
- Length: 2.024 mi (3.257 km)
- Existed: October 29, 1962–present

Farm to Market Road 1578 (FM 1578) is located in Navarro County.

=== FM 1578 (1949) ===
Farm to Market Road 1578
- Location: Cochran County
- Existed: December 29, 1949–March 25, 1961

A previous route numbered FM 1578 was designated on December 29, 1949, from FM 769 north 4.0 miles (6.4 km) to a road intersection. FM 1578 was cancelled on March 25, 1961, and transferred to FM 1169.

== FM 1579 ==
Farm to Market Road 1579
- Location: Fayette County
- Length: 3.55 mi (5.71 km)
- Existed: 1949–present

Farm to Market Road 1579 (FM 1579) is located in Fayette County.

== FM 1580 ==
Farm to Market Road 1580
- Location: Freestone County
- Length: 4.367 mi (7.028 km)
- Existed: 1949–present

Farm to Market Road 1580 (FM 1580) is located in Freestone County.

== FM 1581 ==
Farm to Market Road 1581
- Location: Frio County
- Length: 12.714 mi (Note: The certified length given is shorter than the actual mileage, as the TxDOT description of FM 1581 considers it to be discontinuous at Business I-35-E instead of concurrent with it.) (20.461 km)
- Existed: 1949–present

Farm to Market Road 1581 (FM 1581) is located in Frio County. Its southern terminus is at FM 117 near the community of Divot. The highway runs northeast through unincorporated Frio County and enters Pearsall, intersecting I-35 at exit 99. From here, FM 1581 runs concurrently with Business I-35 to an intersection with FM 140, where the FM 1581 designation ends.

FM 1581 was designated on December 29, 1949, from FM 1465 (now FM 140) southwest on Oil Field Road 6.9 miles (11.1 km). On December 17, 1952, FM 1581 was extended southwest 0.4 miles (0.6 km) across the Frio River. It was extended to its current southern terminus at FM 117 near Divot on November 24, 1959.

== FM 1582 ==
Farm to Market Road 1582
- Location: Frio, La Salle, and McMullen counties
- Length: 26.139 mi (42.067 km)
- Existed: 1949–present

Farm to Market Road 1582 (FM 1582) runs from Spur 581 in Pearsall to SH 97 between Charlotte and Fowlerton.

FM 1582 begins at an intersection with Spur 581 in southern Pearsall. The highway runs southeast through rural areas of Frio County and intersects SH 85 approximately 10 miles (16 km) southeast of Pearsall. FM 1582 briefly enters La Salle County before entering McMullen County, where it ends at an intersection with SH 97.

FM 1582 was designated on December 29, 1949, running from US 81 (now Spur 581) to a road intersection near the current location of SH 85. On December 19, 1958, the highway was extended further southeast to its current terminus at SH 97.

== FM 1583 ==
Farm to Market Road 1583
- Location: Frio County
- Length: 6.778 mi (10.908 km)
- Existed: 1949–present

Farm to Market Road 1583 (FM 1583) is located in Frio County.

FM 1583 begins at I-35/Spur 581 in Derby, with the road continuing west as County Road 4427. The highway runs southeast through rural and unincorporated areas of Frio County before ending at an intersection with SH 85.

FM 1583 was designated on December 29, 1949, running from US 81 (current I-35/Spur 581) in Derby to a point 3.5 miles (5.6 km) southeast of US 81. On September 29, 1977, the highway was extended 3.1 miles (5.0 km) southeast to its current terminus at SH 85.

== FM 1584 ==
Farm to Market Road 1584
- Location: Howard, Borden, and Dawson counties
- Length: 22.45 mi (36.13 km)
- Existed: 1949–present

Farm to Market Road 1584 (FM 1584) runs from US 87 north of Big Spring to US 87 near Ackerly.

FM 1584 begins at an intersection with US 87 just north of Big Spring. The highway runs in a generally north direction, intersecting FM 846 before intersecting FM 1785 in Vealmoor. North of Vealmoor, FM 1584 briefly enters Borden County where it turns left to the west at Vealmoore Road, turns back to the north at County Road 239, and back to the west at County Road 236. The highway enters Dawson County before ending at US 87 near Ackerly.

FM 1584 was designated on December 29, 1949, running north from US 87 to the Howard–Borden county line north of Vealmoor. On November 20, 1951, the highway was extended north and west to the Borden–Dawson county line. On August 20, 1952, FM 1584 was extended west to its current terminus at US 87 near Ackerly.

Junction list

County	Location	mi	km	Destinations	Notes
Howard		0.0	0.0	US 87 – Big Spring, Lamesa	
Howard		4.6	7.4	FM 846 – Knott, Gail	
Howard	Vealmoor	11.6	18.7	FM 1785	
Borden	No major junctions				
Dawson		22.5	36.2	US 87 – Big Spring, Lamesa	
1.000 mi = 1.609 km; 1.000 km = 0.621 mi

== FM 1585 ==
Farm to Market Road 1585
- Location: Cochran, Hockley, and Lubbock counties
- Length: 80.568 mi (Note: The certified length given is shorter than the actual mileage, as the TxDOT description of FM 1585 considers it to be discontinuous at rather concurrent with FM 1780, FM 303 and US 62/US 82.) (129.662 km)
- Existed: 1949–present

Farm to Market Road 1585 (FM 1585) is located in Cochran, Hockley, and Lubbock counties.

FM 1585 begins at an intersection with FM 769 at the New Mexico state line, south of Bledsoe. The highway travels through rural areas of Cochran County, intersecting with SH 214. FM 1585 shares a short overlap with FM 1780 before entering into Hockley County. The highway shares an overlap with FM 300 southwest of Levelland. FM 1585 intersects with US 385 south of Levelland, maintaining its rural route. Crossing into Lubbock County, FM 1585 shares a short overlap with US 62/US 82 southwest of Wolfforth. A few miles east of here, FM 1585 enters into the city of Lubbock, running along the southernmost boundary of the city. The highway leaves the Lubbock city limits just west of the I-27/US 87 intersection. East of I-27/US 87, FM 1585 becomes a rural route once again, ending at an intersection with US 84 just north of Slaton.

FM 1585 was designated on December 29, 1949, from FM 1316 (later FM 1073, then FM 179) 2 miles (3.2 km) south of Wolfforth and ran east for 5 miles (8.0 km). On January 18, 1952, FM 1585 was extended east 12.5 miles (20.1 km) to US 84. On November 21, 1956, FM 1585 was extended west 3.3 miles (5.3 km) to US 62. On November 21, 1957, FM 1585 was extended west to FM 300 (now FM 303), replacing FM 2010. On July 11, 1968, FM 1585 was extended west to FM 1780. On May 18, 1970, FM 1585 was extended west to FM 769, replacing FM 3024.

The section of highway between US 62/US 82 and I-27/US 87 has seen rapid growth as the Lubbock metropolitan area has expanded southward. The segment between US 62/US 82 near Wolfforth and US 84 near Slaton will become a part of the future Loop 88.

Junction list

County	Location	mi	km	Destinations	Notes
Cochran		0.0	0.0	FM 769 – Bledsoe	
Cochran		13.8	22.2	SH 214 – Morton, Plains	
Cochran		26.2	42.2	FM 1780 south – Seagraves	West end of FM 1780 overlap
Cochran		26.8	43.1	FM 1780 north – Whiteface	East end of FM 1780 overlap
Hockley		33.9	54.6	FM 303 south – Sundown	West end of FM 303 overlap
Hockley		34.3	55.2	FM 303 north – Levelland	East end of FM 303 overlap
Hockley		40.9	65.8	US 385 – Levelland, Brownfield	
Hockley		44.0	70.8	FM 3261 north	West end of FM 3261 overlap
Hockley		45.3	72.9	FM 3261 south	East end of FM 3261 overlap
Hockley		47.4	76.3	FM 2646	
Hockley		53.4	85.9	FM 168 – Smyer, Ropesville	
Hockley		58.4	94.0	FM 2378 north	
Lubbock		60.4	97.2	US 62 east / US 82 east – Wolfforth, Lubbock	West end of US 62/82 overlap
Lubbock		62.1	99.9	US 62 west / US 82 east – Brownfield	East end of US 62/82 overlap
Lubbock		65.4	105.3	FM 179 – Wolfforth, Lamesa	
Lubbock	Lubbock	70.4	113.3	FM 1730 south / Slide Road	
Lubbock		74.9	120.5	I-27 / US 87 (Tahoka Highway) – Lubbock, Tahoka	Interchange
Lubbock		78.6	126.5	FM 3431 north – TDCJ Montford Unit	
Lubbock		83.2	133.9	US 84 – Lubbock, Slaton	
1.000 mi = 1.609 km; 1.000 km = 0.621 mi: Concurrency terminus

== FM 1586 ==
Farm to Market Road 1586
- Location: Gonzales County
- Length: 2.755 mi (4.434 km)
- Existed: 1950–present

Farm to Market Road 1586 (FM 1586) is located in Gonzales County.

== FM 1587 ==
Farm to Market Road 1587
- Location: Knox and Haskell counties
- Existed: January 27, 1950–August 29, 1990

Farm to Market Road 1587 (FM 1587) was located in Knox and Haskell counties. No highway currently uses the FM 1587 designation.

FM 1587 was designated on January 27, 1950, running southeast from US 277 in Knox County to the Haskell County line. On July 28, 1955, the highway was extended further southeast another 5.6 miles (9.0 km) to FM 1720. On May 24, 1962, the section from FM 266 south 3.5 miles (5.6 km) was transferred to FM 266. On September 5, 1973, FM 1587 was signed (but not designated) as part of SH 222. FM 1587 was cancelled on August 29, 1990, as the SH 222 designation became official.

== FM 1588 ==
Farm to Market Road 1588
- Location: Maverick County
- Length: 3.507 mi (5.644 km)
- Existed: 1950–present

Farm to Market Road 1588 (FM 1588) is located in Maverick County.

== FM 1589 ==
Farm to Market Road 1589
- Location: Maverick County
- Length: 2.068 mi (3.328 km)
- Existed: 1950–present

Farm to Market Road 1589 (FM 1589) is located in Maverick County.

== FM 1590 ==
Farm to Market Road 1590
- Location: Maverick County
- Length: 4.025 mi (6.478 km)
- Existed: January 28, 1950–present

Farm to Market Road 1590 (FM 1590) is located in Maverick County. It runs in a 4-mile-long (6.4 km) semicircular route eastward, northward, and westward from US 277 via Normandy to FM 1908 south of Quemado.

FM 1590 was designated on January 28, 1950; at the time, both of its termini were at SH 85 (now US 277). It was truncated to its current length on October 19, 1956, when the final 0.4 miles (0.6 km) became a part of an extended FM 1908.

== FM 1591 ==
Farm to Market Road 1591
- Location: Maverick County
- Length: 2.197 mi (3.536 km)
- Existed: January 27, 1950–present

Farm to Market Road 1591 (FM 1591) is located in Maverick County. It runs 2.2 miles (3.5 km) from US 277 north of Quemado eastward to FM 1908.

FM 1591 was designated on January 27, 1950, from SH 85 (now US 277) eastward to its current endpoint, then southward to FM 1590. The latter segment became a part of an extended FM 1908 on October 19, 1956.

== FM 1592 ==
Farm to Market Road 1592
- Location: Sabine County
- Length: 8.715 mi (14.025 km)
- Existed: January 27, 1950–present

Farm to Market Road 1592 (FM 1592) is located in Sabine County. Its southern terminus is at SH 184 northwest of Hemphill. It runs north and northwest for 8.7 miles (14.0 km), intersecting FM 2784 and crossing SH 103, to its northern terminus at FM 1 near Rosevine.

FM 1592 was designated on January 27, 1950, from SH 184 to the proposed location of SH 103. It was extended to FM 1 on August 24, 1955.

== FM 1593 ==
Farm to Market Road 1593
- Location: Jackson and Calhoun counties
- Length: 22.82 mi (36.73 km)
- Existed: 1950–present

Farm to Market Road 1593 (FM 1593) is located in Jackson and Calhoun counties.

== FM 1594 ==
Farm to Market Road 1594
- Location: Foard County
- Length: 8.208 mi (13.209 km)
- Existed: 1950–present

Farm to Market Road 1594 (FM 1594) is located in Foard County.

== FM 1595 ==
Farm to Market Road 1595
- Location: Cameron County
- Length: 2.218 mi (3.570 km)
- Existed: 1950–present

Farm to Market Road 1595 (FM 1595) is located in Cameron County.

== FM 1596 ==
Farm to Market Road 1596
- Location: Live Oak County
- Length: 8.014 mi (12.897 km)
- Existed: 1950–present

Farm to Market Road 1596 (FM 1596) is located in Live Oak County.

== FM 1597 ==
Farm to Market Road 1597
- Location: Jones County
- Length: 5.102 mi (8.211 km)
- Existed: July 28, 1955–present

Farm to Market Road 1597 (FM 1597) is located in Jones County.

FM 1597 begins at an intersection with FM 600 west of Lueders. The highway travels in an eastern direction and enters Leuders. FM 1597 turns northeast at Herrick Street before ending at an intersection with SH 6.

The current FM 1597 was designated on July 28, 1955, running from FM 1193 (now FM 600) to US 380 (now SH 6).

=== FM 1597 (1950) ===
Farm to Market Road 1597
- Location: Hopkins County
- Existed: April 28, 1950–January 16, 1953

FM 1597 was first designated on April 28, 1950, running from FM 275 at Miller Grove eastward 1.9 miles (3.1 km) to a county road. On May 23, 1951, the highway was extended further east to SH 19. FM 1597 was cancelled on January 16, 1953, with the mileage being transferred to FM 1567.

=== FM 1597 (1952) ===
Farm to Market Road 1597
- Location: Colorado County
- Existed: December 17, 1952–November 5, 1954

The second use of the FM 1597 designation was in Colorado County, from FM 102 (now US 90 Alt.) in Eagle Lake northeastward 5.9 miles (9.5 km) to a road intersection. The highway was extended to the Wharton county line on February 24, 1953, resulting in the cancellation of FM 1694. FM 1597 was cancelled on November 5, 1954, and transferred to FM 1093.

== FM 1598 ==
Farm to Market Road 1598
- Location: Moore and Hutchinson counties
- Length: 12.081 mi (19.442 km)
- Existed: May 30, 1950–present

Farm to Market Road 1598 (FM 1598) is located in Moore and Hutchinson counties.

== FM 1599 ==
Farm to Market Road 1599
- Location: Cameron County
- Length: 2.213 mi (3.561 km)
- Existed: December 29, 1949–present

Farm to Market Road 1599 (FM 1599) is located in Cameron County.
