= Gaines Ferry =

- Location within Texas
- 31°20′50″N 93°57′10″W
- Location: Pendleton, Texas / Louisiana

History
- Built: circa 1795

Site notes
- Area: 0.1 acres (0.040 ha)

Gaines Ferry was a ferry on the Sabine River, between what is now Sabine Parish, Louisiana and Sabine County, Texas, at the eastern terminus of Texas State Highway 21, and the western terminus of LA 6. Much of the early history of New Spain, France, Mexico, the Republic of Texas, the United States, including the American Civil War, and the U.S. states of Texas and Louisiana, involve some aspect of Gaines Ferry. It was a major highway to the west and cattle trail east, a port of entry for the Republic of Texas, and a transportation road for military supplies and soldiers during the American Civil War that included transporting cotton to Mexico. Gaines Ferry was the northern entry for many colonists heading to Texas, and it was named after James Gaines who purchased it in 1819. The ferry saw continuous service until 1937.

== History ==
The ferry, formerly Chabanan Ferry circa 1795, was a major crossing between what was to become the states of Texas and Louisiana, across a point where the Gaines-Pendleton Bridge is now located, at the site of the old town of Pendleton, near Milam, Texas. The road leading to the ferry was part of the El Camino Real highway, a series of roads in Louisiana that converged at, or near, the crossing. The road ran from Natchitoches, Louisiana, across the Sabine via the ferry into Texas, through Milam, historic San Augustine and Nacogdoches and then to Mexico City. It was also referred to as the King's Highway, the Old San Antonio Road and also the El Camino Real de Los Tejas or El Camino Real de los Tejas National Historic Trail.

=== The Sabine River boundary ===
The Sabine river was a matter of contention between countries, states, and governments for years. Long a disputed boundary, the issue was left unresolved by the Treaty of Fontainebleau that ceded it from France to Spain, the Third Treaty of San Ildefonso ceding it back to France, and the 1803 Louisiana Purchase agreement ceding it to the United States. The Neutral Ground (Louisiana) military agreement of 1806 created the Sabine Free State during the interim and the Adams–Onís Treaty of 1819, that was not ratified until 1821, was supposed to be the solution. The Mexican independence of Texas from New Spain provided further fuel to the dispute, but this was settled with Texas's independence from Mexico.

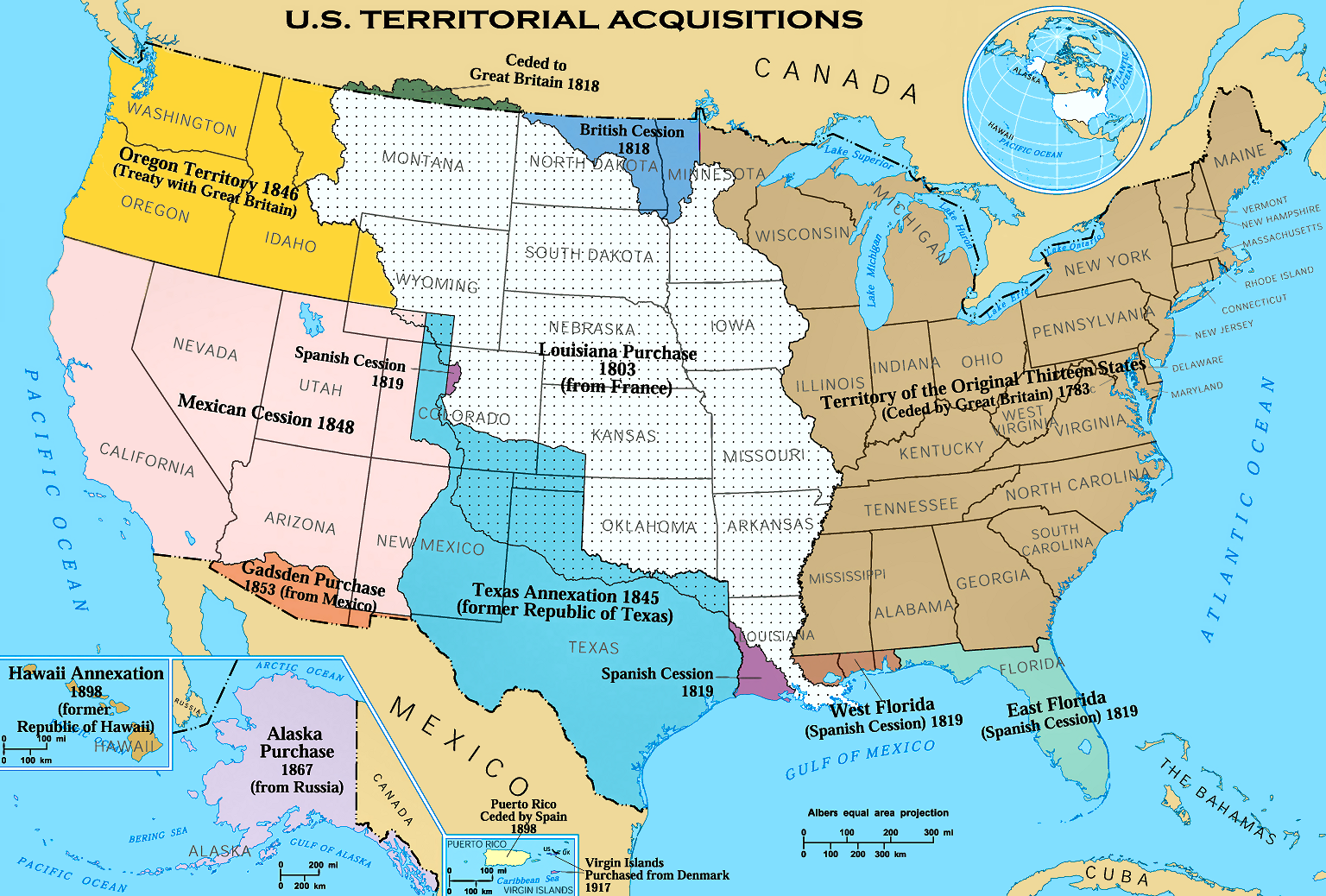
Disputed area shown in lavender

=== James Gaines ===
James Taylor Gaines was born November 14, 1776, Robert Thomas in Culpeper County, Virginia but changed his name in 1810. He was a member of the famed Pendleton family that included a double first cousin, General Edmund Pendleton Gaines, a great uncle, Edmund Pendleton and cousins, Nathaniel Pendleton, John Penn, and John Taylor of Caroline, and was a distant cousin to James Madison. Edmund P. Gains was involved in the arrest and presentation for prosecution against Aaron Burr. Aaron Burr was the second cousin of Dr. Timothy Burr, the owner of Burr's Ferry, and founder of Burr Ferry, about 35 miles down river.

Although history is lacking on his education James Gaines was extremely well educated. Aside from owning a ferry, he also owned a mercantile store, an Inn, was a captain and raised and commanded Alabama and Coushatta Indians troops in the Gutiérrez-Magee expedition, fought in the War of 1812, served as alcalde in 1824, sheriff in 1828, and was Post Master for years. Gaines was a leader in the forces opposing Haden Edwards in the Fredonian Rebellion and the brief Republic of Fredonia. After building the first house, purchasing the ferry, and building a second house for in-laws, he enlisted Thomas Stuart McFarland to survey for a town and named it Pendleton. He sold the ferry and lands in 1843, after owning it over 23 years, and moved to Nacogdoches, where he was a signer of the Texas Declaration of Independence and helped write the Constitution of the Republic of Texas. He then served as a senator in the Republic of Texas in the Fourth, Fifth, and Sixth congresses, representing Shelby, Sabine, and Harrison counties. He owned and operated a hotel in Texas for a time then he decided to move to California.

== Move to California ==
James Gaines decided to follow two sons Edmund and John B. and arrived on the steamer Ecuador in San Francisco on August 23, 1850. There they discovered gold and formed the Mount Gaines Gold Mine that still exist today. He died November 12, 1856, and was buried in Oakland, California.

== End of an era ==
The ferry remained in operation until becoming unneeded in 1937 with the installation of a bridge on what was to become Texas Farm-to-Market #1. The original house, built in 1815, was sold and became known as the Gaines-McGown House. It was destroyed in 1969 with the filling of Toledo Bend Reservoir. The second house was sold to Martha Oliphin and has become known as the Gaines-Oliphint House that was listed on the National Register of Historic Places August 18, 1977.

== See also ==
- Sabine River (Texas–Louisiana)
