= Texas State Highway 184 =

State highway in Texas

State Highway 184
- SH 184, highlighted in red

Route information
- Maintained by TxDOT
- Length: 11.079 mi (17.830 km)
- Existed: 1932–present

Major junctions
- West end: US 96 at Bronson
- East end: SH 87 / FM 83 at Hemphill

Location
- Country: United States
- State: Texas

Highway system
- Highways in Texas; Interstate; US; State; Former; Toll; Loops; Spurs; FM/RM; Park; Rec
← SH 183	→ SH 185

State Highway 184 (SH 184) is a Texas state highway running 11.079 miles (17.830 km) from Bronson east to Hemphill. This route was designated on November 30, 1932, along its current route. This highway was SH 87A before March 19, 1930, and this highway was erroneously omitted from the March 19, 1930 highway log.

== Major Junctions ==
The entire route is in Sabine County.

Location	mi	km	Destinations	Notes
Bronson			US 96 – San Augustine, Jasper	Western terminus
Bronson			FM 1 south – Pineland	West end of SH 184 / FM 1 overlap
Bronson			FM 1 north – Rosevine	East end of SH 184 / FM 1 overlap
			FM 2024 south	
			FM 1592 north – Rosevine	
Hemphill			SH 87 / FM 83 – Newton, Milam	Eastern terminus
1.000 mi = 1.609 km; 1.000 km = 0.621 mi: Concurrency terminus
