= Gaines–Oliphint House =

Historic house in Texas, United States

- Oliphint House
- U.S. National Register of Historic Places
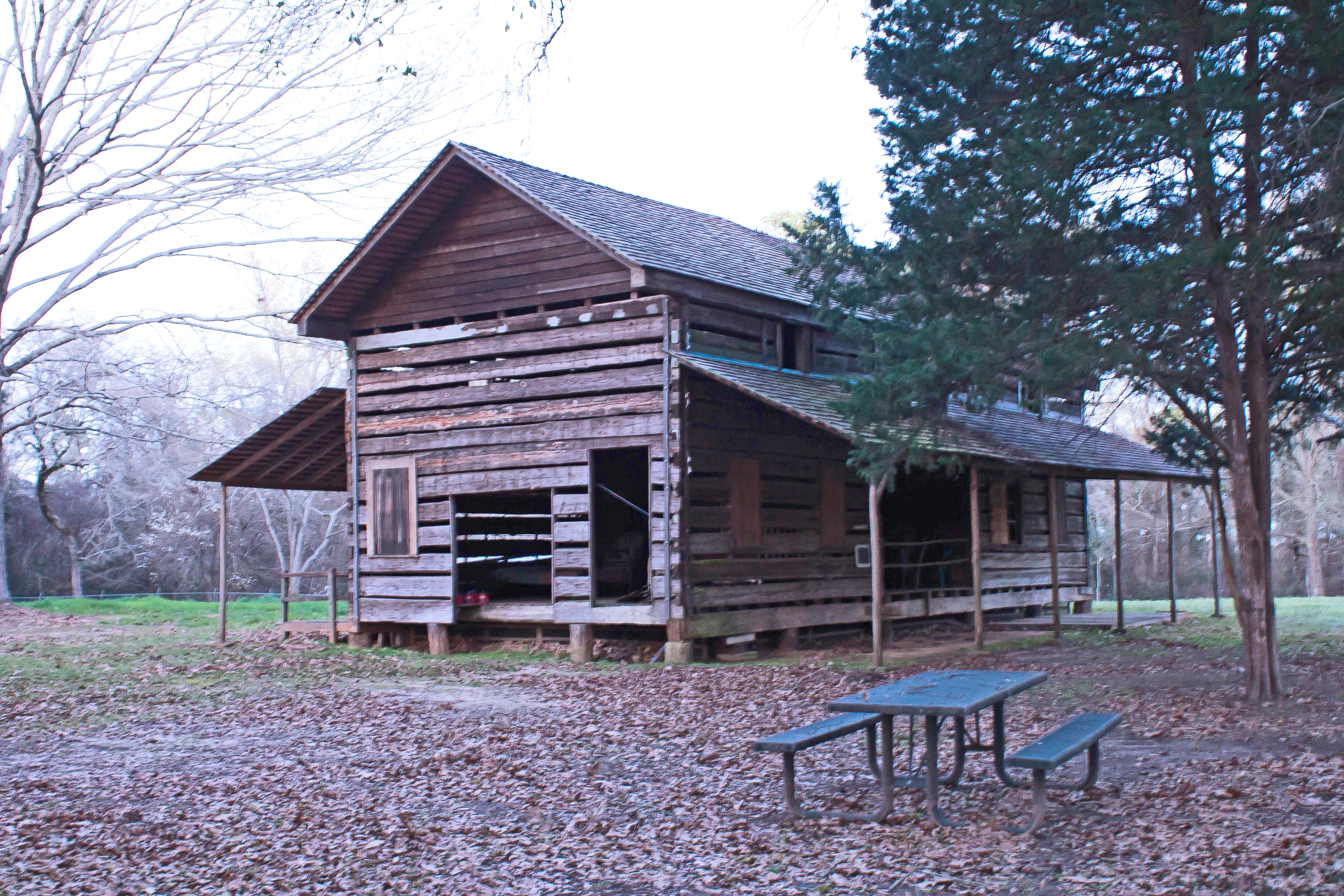
- Oliphint House in 2016

- Location within Texas Location within the United States
- Nearest city: Milam, Texas
- Coordinates: 31°28′4″N 93°45′23″W
- Area: 2 acres (0.81 ha)
- Built: 1820
- Built by: James Taylor Gaines
- NRHP reference No.: 77001473
- Added to NRHP: August 18, 1977

The Gaines–Oliphint House is a historic log cabin in Milam, Sabine County, Texas.

== History ==
The house was built by slaves in 1818 for the third wife's parents of James Taylor Gaines (1776–1856), the second cousin of General Edmund P. Gaines (1777–1849). In 1843, he sold it to Martha A. Oliphint. In 1984, it belonged to Mrs. Tom Foster, who donated it to the Sons of the Republic of Texas, who in turn donated to the Daughters of the Republic of Texas. The latter organization held many fundraisers for its preservation.

Notable Texans, such as Sam Houston, Davy Crockett and Stephen F. Austin, have stayed in the log cabin.

It has been added to the National Register of Historic Places listings since August 18, 1977.

== See also ==
- National Register of Historic Places listings in Sabine County, Texas
- Recorded Texas Historic Landmarks in Sabine County
