= Texas State Highway 103 =

Highway in Texas

State Highway 103
- SH 103, highlighted in red

Route information
- Maintained by TxDOT
- Length: 63.05 mi (101.47 km)
- Existed: by 1933–present

Major junctions
- West end: SH 7 near Redtown
- US 69 at Lufkin Future I-69 / US 59 at Lufkin; US 96 near Bronson
- East end: SH 21 near Milam

Location
- Country: United States
- State: Texas

Highway system
- Highways in Texas; Interstate; US; State; Former; Toll; Loops; Spurs; FM/RM; Park; Rec
← SH 102	→ SH 104

State Highway 103 (SH 103) is a state highway that runs through east Texas from an intersection with SH 7 near the Neches River through Lufkin to an intersection with SH 21 near the Louisiana state line. The route was originally designated in 1926.

== Route description ==
SH 103 begins at an intersection with SH 7 just east of the Neches River. It then travels generally eastward to the western outskirts of Lufkin. The route then briefly travels northeast along State Loop 287 and US Route 69 before entering Lufkin coinciding with the business route of US 69. At Atkinson Drive, it turns east and proceeds out of town. It crosses two arms of Lake Sam Rayburn before reaching its eastern terminus at SH 21 just west of Milam, and 10 miles from the Louisiana state line. The entire route covers 63.05 miles.

== History ==
SH 103 was originally designated on February 17, 1925 from Centerville east through Crockett to Lufkin, and SH 103 was conditional on location and construction. On March 28, 1927, another SH 103 was created as a renumbering of SH 104 from Ranger to Morton Valley (as it was unsure if the other SH 103 would be built). This SH 103 was eliminated by 1930. As a result, there was only one SH 103 from Centerville east through Crockett to Lufkin. On December 1, 1930, SH 103 was cancelled. SH 103 was restored on January 22, 1931. By 1933, the route had only been built between Crockett and Ratcliff, and was only an improved earth road. On July 15, 1935, only the already constructed section from Crockett to Ratcliff remained. The section from Ratcliff to Lufkin was restored on February 25, 1937. On January 26, 1939, SH 103 was extended east to Milam. On September 26, 1939, the western section from Crockett to Ratcliff was reassigned to SH 7 (the original plan was to reroute it northeast over SH 266 to Nacogdoches), and the remainder was redesignated as SH 293 as originally planned. On October 30, 1939, before signage was changed, SH 293 was changed back to SH 103. By 1940, sections around Lufkin were completed, but did not connect to earthen roads to the west. On January 22, 1940, the section of SH 103 from Ratcliff to the Neches River was cancelled. On March 26, 1942, SH 103 was extended west 3.5 miles from the Neches River. On September 14, 1944, SH 103 was extended west to Ratcliff. On June 14, 1961, SH 103 was truncated to rerouted SH 7, which was built along a new route and part of cancelled FM 327 (the rest of FM 327 became part of FM 1819). On June 21, 1990, one small section of SH 103 from Loop 287 to Business US 59 was transferred to Business US 69.

== Major intersections ==
County	Location	mi	km	Destinations	Notes
Angelina				SH 7 – Crockett, Nacogdoches	
Angelina				FM 1819 north	
Angelina				FM 2021 east – Clawson	
Angelina				FM 706 south	west end of FM 706 overlap
Angelina				FM 706 north	east end of FM 706 overlap
Angelina	Lufkin			Loop 287 south (North John Redditt Drive) / Spur 339 south (North Raguet Street) – Downtown District	west end of Loop 287 overlap
Angelina	Lufkin			Loop 36 south – Keltys	
Angelina	Lufkin			US 69 north / FM 2680 north – Tyler	interchange; west end of US 69 Bus. overlap
Angelina	Lufkin			US 69 south / Loop 287 north (Ellen Trout Drive) – Nacogdoches, Beaumont, Houston	interchange; east end of Loop 287 overlap
Angelina	Lufkin			FM 2251 north	
Angelina	Lufkin			I-69 BL / Bus. US 59 north (North Timberland Drive)	west end of Bus. I-69/US 59 Bus. overlap
Angelina	Lufkin			Loop 266 south (Hoskins Street)	
Angelina	Lufkin			I-69 BL / Bus. US 59 south / Bus. US 69 south (North Timberland Drive) to SH 94 / East Atkinson Drive – Downtown District	east end of Bus. I-69/US 59 Bus. / US 69 Bus. overlap
Angelina	Lufkin			Future I-69 / US 59 / US 69 / Loop 287 (North Medford Drive) – Houston, Nacogdoches	interchange; U.S. 59 is the future Interstate 69
Angelina	Lufkin			FM 842	
Angelina				FM 326 south	
Angelina				FM 1669 south – Huntington	west end of FM 1669 overlap
Angelina				FM 1669 north – Marion Ferry Park	east end of FM 1669 overlap
Nacogdoches	Etoile			FM 226 north – Woden, Nacogdoches	west end of FM 226 overlap
Nacogdoches	Etoile			FM 226 south – Shirley Creek Park	east end of FM 226 overlap
Nacogdoches				FM 95 north – Chireno	
San Augustine				FM 1277 – Broaddus	
San Augustine				FM 1992 north	
San Augustine				SH 147 south – Broaddus, Zavalla	west end of SH 147 overlap
San Augustine				SH 147 north – San Augustine	east end of SH 147 overlap
San Augustine				FM 705 – San Augustine	
San Augustine				FM 3279 south	
San Augustine	Chinquapin			FM 1751	
San Augustine				US 96 – Bronson, San Augustine	interchange
San Augustine	Rebecca			FM 3229 south	
Sabine				FM 1 south / FM 3229 north – Bronson	west end of FM 1 overlap
Sabine				FM 1 north – Rosevine	east end of FM 1 overlap
Sabine	Rosevine			FM 1592 – San Augustine, Hemphill	
Sabine				FM 2784 south (Woodland Hills)	
Sabine				SH 21 – Milam, San Augustine	
1.000 mi = 1.609 km; 1.000 km = 0.621 mi
