= National Register of Historic Places listings in Sabine County, Texas =

Location of Sabine County in Texas

This is a list of the National Register of Historic Places listings in Sabine County, Texas.

This is intended to be a complete list of properties listed on the National Register of Historic Places in Sabine County, Texas. There are three properties listed on the National Register in the county.

This National Park Service list is complete through NPS recent listings posted March 21, 2025.

== Current listings ==
The publicly disclosed locations of National Register properties may be seen in a mapping service provided.

	Name on the Register	Image	Date listed	Location	City or town	Description
1	Lobanillo Swales	Lobanillo Swales	November 24, 2015 (#15000839)	Address restricted	Geneva vicinity	
2	Oliphint House	Oliphint House	August 18, 1977 (#77001473)	7 mi (11 km). E of Milam off TX 21; 31°28′04″N 93°45′23″W	Milam	

== Former listings ==
	Name on the Register	Image	Date listed	Date removed	Location	City or town	Description
3	Toole Building		December 20, 2002 (#02001568)	September 21, 2018	202 Main St. 31°20′32″N 93°50′56″W	Hemphill	Demolished between 2005 and 2009

== See also ==
- National Register of Historic Places listings in Texas
- Recorded Texas Historic Landmarks in Sabine County
