= U.S. Route 96 =

Highway in the United States

U.S. Highway 96
- US 96 highlighted in red

Route information
- Maintained by TxDOT
- Length: 133.746 mi (215.243 km)
- Existed: September 26, 1939–present

Major junctions
- South end: US 69 / US 287 / SH 87 in Port Arthur
- I-10 / US 90 in Beaumont; US 190 in Jasper
- North end: Future I-69 / Future I-369 / US 59 / US 84 in Tenaha

Location
- Country: United States
- State: Texas
- Counties: Jefferson, Hardin, Jasper, Sabine, San Augustine, Shelby

Highway system
- United States Numbered Highway System; List; Special; Divided; Highways in Texas; Interstate; US; State; Former; Toll; Loops; Spurs; FM/RM; Park; Rec
← US 95	US	→ US 97
← SH 95	TX	→ SH 96

U.S. Highway 96 (US 96) is a north–south United States Numbered Highway that runs for about 117.11 miles (188.47 km) entirely in the U.S state of Texas. Its number is a violation of the standard numbering convention, as even-numbered two-digit highways are east–west routes by rule. As of 2004, the highway's southern terminus (as well as those of US 287 and US 69) is in Port Arthur at an intersection with State Highway 87 (SH 87). Its northern terminus is in Tenaha at an intersection with US 59 (Future I-69)/(Future I-369) and US 84 (Future I-69).

== Route description ==
US 96 begins at SH 87 in Port Arthur, at a southern terminus it also shares with US 69 and US 287. The three highways head in a northwest direction toward Beaumont. In Beaumont, the three highways briefly merge with Interstate 10 (I-10), but then split from that freeway continuing northwest. In Lumberton, US 96 separates from US 287 and US 69, and heads northeast towards Silsbee. In Silsbee, US 96 splits with US 96F, a special route of US 96 that serves downtown Silsbee, while being routed on a bypass freeway. After Silsbee, US 96 heads northeast to Buna, then north to Kirbyville and Jasper. After Jasper. US 96 comes near the Sam Rayburn Reservoir near Pineland. US 96 eventually comes to its northern terminus near Tenaha at a junction with US 59 (Future I-69)/(Future I-369) and US 84 (Future I-69).

== History ==
When commissioned in 1927, US 96 was routed from Rosenberg via Wharton, Victoria, Beeville, Skidmore, Alice, Falfurrias, and San Juan to Brownsville.

In 1933, the present route of US 96 was originally proposed to be part of US 71. Under this plan, discussed at a meeting of the United States Good Roads Association in Beaumont, US 71 was to be diverted out of Louisiana altogether and instead re-routed from the Texarkana area southward through East Texas.

In 1935, US 96 was rerouted to Laredo instead of Brownsville. 03/01/1935 - Beginning at Rosenburg, Wharton, Victoria, Beeville, Skidmore, Mathis, Alice, Laredo. This is the current route of US 59.

In 1935, US 59 was initially routed from Teneha to Port Arthur following the basic route of the current US 96. US 96 began in Rosenburg (Near Houston) and roughly followed the current route of US 59 to Alice then on to Brownsville and later was rerouted to Laredo.

Minute Order 016701, dated 09/26/1939 radically re-aligned US 96 to travel a route formerly used by US 59: From Tenaha via Center, San Augustine, Jasper, Buna, Voth, and Beaumont to Port Arthur (Shelby, San Augustine, Sabine, Jasper, Hardin, and Jefferson Counties). This renumbered US 59 and 96 beginning in Teneha to roughly their current paths. SH 35 from Teneha to Houston had become US 59. The entirety of the pre-1939 US 96 had been changed to US 59 and US 59 South of Teneha had been renumbered to US 96.

== Future ==
As part of the I-14 System in Texas project, US 96 between Jasper and Beaumont is proposed to be upgraded to interstate standards. The interstate segment would begin at either US 190/SH 63 (Future I-14) and head southward before terminating at I-10.

== Major intersections ==
County	Location	mi	km	Destinations	Notes
Jefferson	Port Arthur	0.0	0.0	SH 87 (Gulfway Drive)	Southern end of US 69 / US 287 concurrency
Jefferson	Port Arthur	1.9	3.1	SH 73 – Winnie, Groves	Interchange; south end of freeway
Jefferson	Port Arthur	2.8	4.5	60th Street / Jimmy Johnson Boulevard	Access to The Medical Center of Southeast Texas
Jefferson	Port Arthur–Nederland line	4.8	7.7	FM 365 – Port Neches, Fannett	
Jefferson	Port Arthur–Nederland line	5.8	9.3	Nederland Avenue	
Jefferson	Nederland	6.6	10.6	Access to Jack Brooks Regional Airport	
Jefferson	Nederland	7.4	11.9	Beauxart Garden Road / Spurlock Road	
Jefferson	Central Gardens	8.9	14.3	FM 3514	
Jefferson	Central Gardens	11.4	18.3	Jefferson County Prison Complex	Southbound exit and northbound entrance
Jefferson	Beaumont	10.8	17.4	SH 347 – Nederland	no southbound entrance
Jefferson	Beaumont	12.4	20.0	Spur 380 (M.L. King Parkway)	
Jefferson	Beaumont	13.8	22.2	Spur 93 (Avenue A) / Highland Avenue	
Jefferson	Beaumont	14.7	23.7	Spur 93 (Avenue A) / Florida Avenue / Erie Street	
Jefferson	Beaumont	15.6	25.1	4th Street	
Jefferson	Beaumont	16.6	26.7	SH 124 (Fannett Road)	
Jefferson	Beaumont	17.6	28.3	I-10 west – Houston	south end of I-10 overlap; US 96 south follows exit 849
Jefferson	Beaumont	17.8	28.6	Washington Boulevard	I-10 exit 850
Jefferson	Beaumont	18.8	30.3	US 90 – Liberty	I-10 exit 851, Access to Memorial Hermann Baptist Beaumont Hospital
Jefferson	Beaumont	20.2	32.5	Laurel Avenue	Southbound exit and northbound entrance; I-10 exit 852A
Jefferson	Beaumont	19.2	30.9	Calder Avenue / Harrison Avenue	I-10 exit 852B; no direct southbound exit (signed at Delaware Street)
Jefferson	Beaumont	20.4	32.8	I-10 east – Lake Charles	north end of I-10 overlap; US 96 north follows exit 853A
Jefferson	Beaumont	21.5	34.6	Delaware Street	
Jefferson	Beaumont	21.9	35.2	11th Street	Southbound exit and northbound entrance
Jefferson	Beaumont	21.7	34.9	Lucas Drive	
Jefferson	Beaumont	22.9	36.9	Dowlen Road	
Jefferson	Beaumont	23.7	38.1	SH 105 – Sour Lake, Conroe	
Jefferson	Beaumont	25.2	40.6	Chinn Lane	No southbound exit
Jefferson	Beaumont	25.6	41.2	Old Voth Road / RFD Road	No northbound exit
Jefferson	Beaumont	27.1	43.6	Tram Road	
Hardin	Rose Hill Acres	28.1	45.2	Cooks Lake Road	
Hardin	Rose Hill Acres	29.0	46.7	Keith Road	
Hardin	Rose Hill Acres	30.2	48.6	FM 3513 / Mitchell Road	No direct southbound exit (signed at Keith Road)
Hardin	Lumberton	30.8	49.6	US 69 / US 287 – Kountze, Lufkin	Interchange; north end of freeway; north end of US 69 / US 287 overlap
Hardin	Lumberton	32.3	52.0	FM 421 west (Country Lane Drive)	
Hardin	Silsbee	36.7	59.1	Bus. US 96 north – Silsbee	Interchange; no northbound entrance
Hardin	Silsbee	40.0	64.4	SH 327 – Silsbee	Interchange
Hardin	Silsbee	41.4	66.6	Bus. US 96 south – Silsbee	Interchange
Jasper	Evadale	45.2	72.7	FM 105 / FM 2246 – Evadale, Vidor	Interchange
Jasper	Buna	52.9	85.1	Bus. US 96 north	
Jasper	Buna	54.2	87.2	SH 62 south / FM 1004 north to Bus. US 96	
Jasper	Call Junction	65.1	104.8	FM 1004 south – Buna	south end of FM 1004 overlap
Jasper	Call Junction	65.4	105.3	FM 1004 north – Trout Creek	north end of FM 1004 overlap
Jasper	Kirbyville	68.7	110.6	FM 82 to FM 1013 – Airport, Trout Creek	
Jasper	Kirbyville	70.0	112.7	FM 1013 (Main Street) – Spurger, Call, Trout Creek	
Jasper	Kirbyville	70.8	113.9	FM 363 east to SH 87 – Bon Wier, Bleakwood	
Jasper		78.4	126.2	FM 2245 east – Roganville	
Jasper		83.0	133.6	FM 1005 south – Magnolia Springs	
Jasper	Jasper	88.6	142.6	US 190 / SH 63 – Woodville, Newton, Airport, Martin Dies Jr. State Park	
Jasper	Jasper	89.3	143.7	FM 2799 west (East Houston Street)	
Jasper	Jasper	89.5	144.0	FM 776 east (Milam Street)	
Jasper	Jasper	90.4	145.5	FM 2800 west (Martin L. King Jr. Boulevard)	
Jasper		98.8	159.0	RE 255 – Sam Rayburn Dam, Toledo Bend Dam	
Jasper	Browndell			FM 1007 to RE 255 – Browndell	
Jasper	Browndell			Loop 149 north – Brookeland, Mill Creek Park	
Sabine	Brookeland			Loop 149 south – Browndell, Mill Creek Park	
Sabine				FM 201 east	
Sabine				Spur 414 south – Sam Rayburn Reservoir	
Sabine	Pineland			FM 1 north to FM 83 – Bronson, Hemphill	
Sabine	Pineland			FM 83 – Broaddus, Hemphill	
Sabine	Bronson			FM 2866 south	
Sabine	Bronson			SH 184 east – Hemphill, Patricia Huffman Smith NASA Museum	
San Augustine				SH 103 – Lufkin, Milam, Many	Interchange
San Augustine				FM 1751 south – Sam Rayburn Reservoir	
San Augustine				FM 2213 north – San Augustine	
San Augustine	San Augustine			SH 147 – Broaddus, Zavalla, Shelbyville, El Camino Real Tourist Center (Mission Dolores)	
San Augustine	San Augustine			FM 1277 south – Broaddus	
San Augustine	San Augustine			SH 21 to SH 103 – Nacogdoches, Milam, Many	
San Augustine	San Augustine			FM 711 north	
San Augustine				FM 3451 east	
San Augustine				FM 1279 east – Bland Lake	
Shelby				FM 2140 north – Neuville	
Shelby				FM 417 east – Shelbyville, Neuville	
Shelby	Center			Loop 500 to SH 7 / SH 87 south – Nacogdoches, Shelbyville, Hemphill	
Shelby	Center			SH 7 (Nacogdoches Street / San Augustine Street) / SH 87 south – Nacogdoches, Hemphill, Logansport	
Shelby	Center			FM 138 west – Arcadia, Garrison	
Shelby	Center			SH 87 north (Moffett Drive / Tenaha Street) – Timpson	
Shelby	Center			FM 2026 west – Timpson	
Shelby	Center			Loop 500 to SH 7 / SH 87 south – Logansport, Shelbyville, Hemphill	
Shelby	Tenaha			Loop 157 north – Tenaha	
Shelby	Tenaha			Future I-369 north / Future I-69 / US 59 / US 84 – Carthage, Nacogdoches, Joaquin	Interchange, I-69 will follow US 59 South to Houston, and US 84 east to Mansfield. I-369 will follow US 59 north to Texarkana. Interchange is open for US 59/US 84 traffic.
1.000 mi = 1.609 km; 1.000 km = 0.621 mi: Concurrency terminus; Incomplete access; Unopened

== Business routes ==
=== Buna business highway ===
Business U.S. Highway 96
- Location: Buna
- Length: 1.334 mi (2.147 km)
- Existed: 1990–present

Business U.S. Highway 96-E (US 96 Bus.) is a 1.3-mile-long (2.1 km) spur of US 96 in the Jasper County census designated place of Buna. The highway was designated on September 25, 1939 as Texas State Highway Loop 68, going from US 59 through Buna to US 59. On January 18, 1955, Loop 68 became Texas State Highway Spur 68, and the route was moved to the current route. On June 21, 1990, the designation was changed to Business US 96-E, and a concurrency with SH 62 was added. It begins southwest of the community at US 96 and travels northeast paralleling a railroad. Except for one small industry, the highway travels past residential areas before it ends at SH 62 in the center of Buna. A left turn onto SH 62 can be made to access US 96 again.

=== Silsbee business highway ===
Business U.S. Highway 96
- Location: Silsbee
- Length: 5.223 mi (8.406 km)
- Existed: 1990–present

Business U.S. Highway 96-F (US 96 Bus.) is a five-mile-long (8.0 km) business loop of US 96 serving the Hardin County city of Silsbee. The highway begins at an interchange with US 96 south of the city and travels north to the city limits as a four-lane undivided road. Upon reaching the Silsbee city limits, the name of the road also becomes 5th Street. In the center of the city, US 96 Bus. reaches Avenue N which carries SH 327. At Avenue G, US 96 Bus. turns right while FM 92 continues north through the city. FM 418's eastern terminus occurs at a stop-controlled T intersection east of the city center. At the highway's northern intersection with US 96, US 96 Bus. briefly runs on two frontage roads on either side of US 96 before it terminates at right-in/right-out intersections with the divided US 96.

The route was originally designated on Texas State Highway Loop 498 on November 30, 1978. The route was changed to Business US 96-F on June 21, 1990.

The number was originally used for Texas State Highway Spur 498, designated on April 29, 1971 from SH 146 to Spur 501 in LaPorte via Wharton Weems Blvd. This was cancelled on July 28, 1977 and mileage was transferred to rerouted Loop 410 (not to be confused with I-410), whose alignment on Fairmont Parkway was cancelled and given to the city of LaPorte. Loop 410 was marked as Business SH 146, and became Business SH 146-D on June 21, 1990. Note that the sections of Business SH 146-D on Broadway Street and Main Street were cancelled on March 26, 2009 and given to the city of LaPorte.
