= Texas State Highway 147 =

State highway in Texas

State Highway 147
- SH 147 highlighted in red

Route information
- Maintained by TxDOT
- Length: 46.84 mi (75.38 km)
- Existed: 1930–present

Major junctions
- South end: SH 63 at Zavalla
- US 96 at San Augustine
- North end: SH 87 near Shelbyville

Location
- Country: United States
- State: Texas

Highway system
- Highways in Texas; Interstate; US; State; Former; Toll; Loops; Spurs; FM/RM; Park; Rec
← SH 146	→ SH 148

State Highway 147 (SH 147) is a state highway that runs from Zavalla north near to Shelbyville in Deep East Texas. The route was designated on March 19, 1930 as a renumbering of SH 8B from San Augustine to Zavalla. On March 26, 1942, SH 147 was cancelled and redesignated as FM 10. On September 9, 1947, FM 10 was cancelled and redesignated as SH 147, its original designation. SH 147 was extended north along the old route of U.S. Highway 96 from San Augustine to southeast of Shelbyville on August 20, 1952. On July 31, 1984, SH 147 was rerouted to be concurrent with new SH 21 rather than old SH 21.

== Junction list ==
County	Location	mi	km	Destinations	Notes
Angelina	Zavalla			SH 63	
Angelina	Zavalla			FM 2109	
Angelina				FM 3123	
San Augustine				FM 2851	
San Augustine				FM 3185	
San Augustine	Broaddus			FM 83	
San Augustine	Broaddus			FM 2558	
San Augustine				FM 1277	
San Augustine				SH 103 west	South end of SH 103 overlap
San Augustine				SH 103 east	North end of SH 103 overlap
San Augustine				FM 705	
San Augustine				FM 1992	
San Augustine	San Augustine			US 96	
San Augustine	San Augustine			SH 21 west	South end of SH 21 overlap
San Augustine	San Augustine			SH 21 east	North end of SH 21 overlap
San Augustine	San Augustine			FM 353	
San Augustine				FM 1279 west	South end of FM 1279 overlap
San Augustine				FM 1279 east	North end of FM 1279 overlap
Shelby				SH 87	
1.000 mi = 1.609 km; 1.000 km = 0.621 mi: Concurrency terminus
