= East Mayfield, Texas =

Coordinates: 31.3415°N 93.8647°W

East Mayfield was a town in central Sabine County, Texas, United States. Named after Earle Bradford Mayfield, a state and later U.S. senator, the town developed beginning circa 1912 after the Knox Lumber Company opened a mill there.

== History ==
East Mayfield was incorporated as a municipality on January 8, 1919, following an election in which fifty-five people voted for incorporation, with none opposed. In 1922, the mill, along with Knox timber holdings, was sold to the Temple Lumber Company. The Knox Lumber Company, followed by the Temple Lumber Company Lufkin, ran a railway line called the Hemphill & Gulf Railroad to provide rail service to their sawmill in East Mayfield.

By 1930, East Mayfield had a population of 1,179. Most of the town's adults employed at the lumber company. Temple Lumber Company continued to operate the mill until 1937 when it was destroyed by fire. Due to the rapid depletion of timber on the company's land, the mill was never rebuilt. The town went into decline. On November 20, 1939, East Mayfield residents voted to disincorporate the town.

Today, the area once known as East Mayfield forms the southwestern portion of Hemphill, the county seat of Sabine County and is commemorated by a historical marker.
