= Texas State Highway 327 =

Highway in Texas

State Highway 327
- SH 327, highlighted in red

Route information
- Maintained by TxDOT
- Length: 8.006 mi (12.884 km)
- Existed: 1940–present

Major junctions
- West end: US 69 / US 287 near Kountze
- East end: US 96 in Silsbee

Location
- Country: United States
- State: Texas
- Counties: Hardin

Highway system
- Highways in Texas; Interstate; US; State; Former; Toll; Loops; Spurs; FM/RM; Park; Rec
← SH 326	→ SH 328

State Highway 327 (SH 327) is a 8.006-mile (12.884 km) state highway in the U.S. state of Texas. The highway begins at a junction with U.S. Highway 69 (US 69) and US 287 south of Kountze and heads east to a junction with U.S. Highway 96 in Silsbee.

== History ==
SH 327 was designated on February 13, 1940 to serve as a route from US 69 south of Kountze to Silsbee. On February 23, 1956 the highway was extended to the east to the new location of US 96.

== Route description ==
SH 327 begins in East Texas at a junction with US 69 and US 287. It intersects US 96 Bus. in Silsbee. SH 327 reaches its eastern terminus at US 96 in Silsbee.

== Junction list ==
The entire route is in Hardin County.

Location	mi	km	Destinations	Notes
			US 69 / US 287	
Silsbee			Bus. US 96	
Silsbee			US 96	
1.000 mi = 1.609 km; 1.000 km = 0.621 mi
