= Arbala, Texas =

Unincorporated community in Texas, US

Arbala
- Unincorporated community
- Location in Texas
- Coordinates: 32.9876180°N 95.6532914°W
- Country: United States
- State: Texas
- County: Hopkins
- Elevation: 490 ft (150 m)

Arbala is an unincorporated community in Hopkins County, Texas, United States. Founded in 1857, by brothers F. L. and Daniel Clifton, who named it Clifton's Prairie, for themselves. The name changed to Arbala in 1899 to homogenize with its post office of the same name, which operated until 1923. During its peak in the 1920s, it has a population of 100 and a school with over 100 attendees. The community declined following World War II, with a population of 20 in 1952. Though, it has since risen to 41 as of 2000.
