= Bronson, Texas =

Unincorporated community in Texas, US

Coordinates: 31°20′39″N 94°00′49″W

Bronson is an unincorporated community in west central Sabine County, Texas, United States. It is located on U.S. Route 96 at the junction of State Highway 184, nine miles west of Hemphill. The ZIP Code for Bronson is 75930.

Named for Samuel Bronson Cooper, the area was first settled in 1895 by settler and developer John Henry Kirby. In 1902, he started the Kirby Lumber Company, which at one time controlled more than 300,000 acres (1200 km^{2}) of East Texas pinelands and operated thirteen sawmills. That same year, a post office and weekly newspaper - the Bronson Bulletin, were established. The Bronson Independent School District was created in 1905.

Bronson had a population of 1,000 in 1910. During the 1920s, the population peaked at approximately 1,200 as major highway construction began in the area. Economic hardships and a diminishing timber supply during the 1930s resulted in a population decline, which accelerated in the 1940s. By 1949, Bronson had an estimated 300 residents.

Bronson ISD consolidated with the Pineland schools in 1962, forming the West Sabine Independent School District. In 1992, Bronson was home to 254 residents. That figure rose to 377 by 2000.
