= Hemphill Independent School District =

School district in Texas

Hemphill Independent School District is a public school district based in Hemphill, Texas (USA).

In 2009, the school district was rated "academically acceptable" by the Texas Education Agency.

== Campuses ==
- Hemphill High (Grades 9-12)
- Hemphill Middle (Grades 5-8)
- Hemphill Elementary (Grades PK-4)
