= Rosevine, Texas =

Unincorporated community in Texas, United States

Coordinates: 31°25′14″N 93°58′31″W

Rosevine is an unincorporated community in northwestern Sabine County, Texas, United States. It is located along State Highway 103 10 miles northwest of Hemphill. As early as 1936, the population was an estimated 75 residents. As of the census of 2000, the population was estimated at 50.
