= Sabine County, Texas =

County in the United States

- County
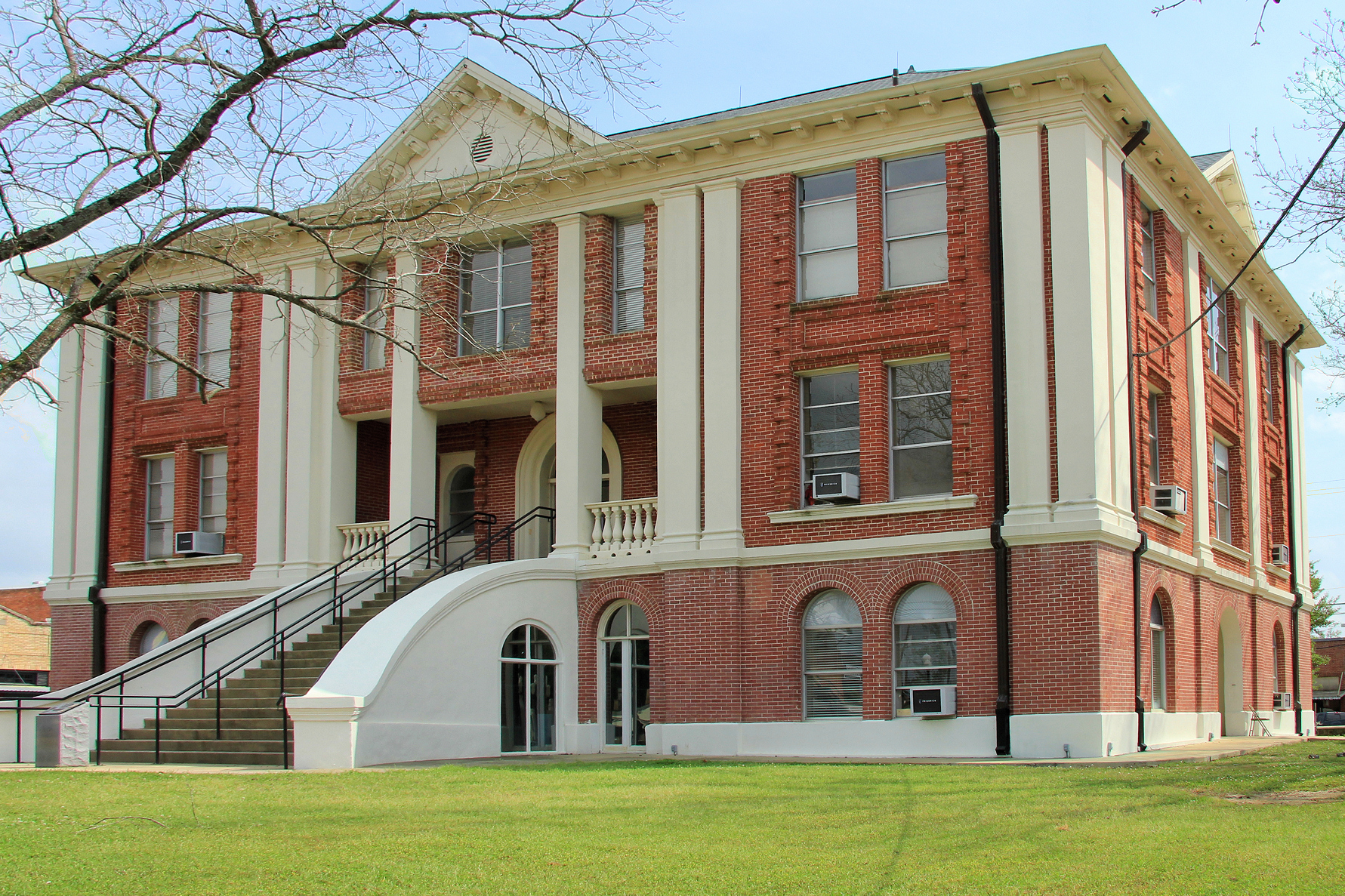
- The Sabine County Courthouse

- Location within the U.S. state of Texas
- Coordinates: 31°20′N 93°51′W
- Country: United States
- State: Texas
- Founded: 1837
- Named for: Sabine River
- Seat: Hemphill
- Largest city: Milam

Area
  - Total: 577 sq mi (1,490 km^{2})
  - Land: 491 sq mi (1,270 km^{2})
  - Water: 85 sq mi (220 km^{2}) 15%

Population (2020)
  - Total: 9,894
  - Estimate (2025): 10,012 ▲
  - Density: 20.2/sq mi (7.78/km^{2})
- Time zone: UTC−6 (Central)
  - Summer (DST): UTC−5 (CDT)
- Congressional district: 1st
- Website: www.co.sabine.tx.us

Sabine County is a county located on the central eastern border of the U.S. state of Texas. As of the 2020 census, its population was 9,894. The county was organized on December 14, 1837, and named for the Sabine River, which forms its eastern border.

== Geography ==
According to the United States Census Bureau, the county has a total area of 577 square miles (1,490 km^{2}), of which 491 square miles (1,270 km^{2}) is land and 85 square miles (220 km^{2}) (15%) is water.

=== Major highways ===
- U.S. Highway 96
- State Highway 21
- State Highway 87
- State Highway 103
- State Highway 184
- Loop 149
- Spur 35
- Spur 165
- Spur 414

=== National Protected Areas ===
- Sabine National Forest (part)

=== Adjacent counties and parish ===
- Shelby County (north)
- Sabine Parish, Louisiana (east)
- Newton County (south)
- Jasper County (southwest)
- San Augustine County (west)

== History ==
Like other eastern Texas counties, Sabine was originally developed as cotton plantations, which depended on the labor of numerous enslaved African Americans. After the Civil War and emancipation, many freedmen remained in the rural area, working as tenant farmers and sharecroppers. There was considerable violence by whites against blacks during and after Reconstruction. After 1877 and through the early 20th century, Sabine County had 10 lynchings of blacks by whites in acts of racial terrorism. This was when the county was heavily Democrat. This was the fourth-highest total in the state, where lynchings took place in nearly all counties through this period.

From 1930 to 1970, the population declined as many African Americans left this rural county and other parts of the South in the Great Migration to escape Jim Crow oppression and seek better jobs, especially in Northern industrial cities and on the West Coast, where the defense industry built up during World War II.

== Demographics ==
Historical population
Census	Pop.	Note	%±
1850	2,498		—
1860	2,750		10.1%
1870	3,256		18.4%
1880	4,161		27.8%
1890	4,969		19.4%
1900	6,394		28.7%
1910	8,582		34.2%
1920	12,299		43.3%
1930	11,998		−2.4%
1940	10,896		−9.2%
1950	8,568		−21.4%
1960	7,302		−14.8%
1970	7,187		−1.6%
1980	8,702		21.1%
1990	9,586		10.2%
2000	10,469		9.2%
2010	10,834		3.5%
2020	9,894		−8.7%
2025 (est.)	10,012	▲	1.2%
U.S. Decennial Census; 1850–2010 2010-2020

=== 2020 census ===
As of the 2020 census, the county had a population of 9,894. The median age was 53.8 years, 18.5% of residents were under the age of 18, and 30.0% of residents were 65 years of age or older. For every 100 females there were 99.3 males, and for every 100 females age 18 and over there were 98.5 males age 18 and over.

The racial makeup of the county in 2020 was 85.2% White, 7.5% Black or African American, 0.5% American Indian and Alaska Native, 0.5% Asian, <0.1% Native Hawaiian and Pacific Islander, 1.4% from some other race, and 4.9% from two or more races. Hispanic or Latino residents of any race comprised 4.0% of the population.

Less than 0.1% of residents lived in urban areas, while 100.0% lived in rural areas.

There were 4,387 households in the county, of which 22.3% had children under the age of 18 living in them. Of all households, 50.9% were married-couple households, 21.1% were households with a male householder and no spouse or partner present, and 23.6% were households with a female householder and no spouse or partner present. About 30.2% of all households were made up of individuals and 16.8% had someone living alone who was 65 years of age or older.

There were 7,563 housing units, of which 42.0% were vacant. Among occupied housing units, 84.7% were owner-occupied and 15.3% were renter-occupied. The homeowner vacancy rate was 2.7% and the rental vacancy rate was 11.9%.

=== Racial and ethnic composition ===
Sabine County, Texas – Racial and ethnic composition Note: the US Census treats Hispanic/Latino as an ethnic category. This table excludes Latinos from the racial categories and assigns them to a separate category. Hispanics/Latinos may be of any race.
Race / Ethnicity (NH = Non-Hispanic)	Pop 1980	Pop 1990	Pop 2000	Pop 2010	Pop 2020	% 1980	% 1990	% 2000	% 2010	% 2020
White alone (NH)	7,196	8,339	9,115	9,484	8,307	82.69%	86.99%	87.07%	87.54%	83.96%
Black or African American alone (NH)	1,371	1,109	1,039	778	734	15.75%	11.57%	9.92%	7.18%	7.42%
Native American or Alaska Native alone (NH)	19	10	29	54	51	0.22%	0.10%	0.28%	0.50%	0.52%
Asian alone (NH)	2	11	9	33	52	0.02%	0.11%	0.09%	0.30%	0.53%
Native Hawaiian or Pacific Islander alone (NH)	x	x	3	0	0	x	x	0.03%	0.00%	0.00%
Other race alone (NH)	3	6	2	6	35	0.03%	0.06%	0.02%	0.06%	0.35%
Mixed race or Multiracial (NH)	x	x	83	135	322	x	x	0.79%	1.25%	3.25%
Hispanic or Latino (any race)	111	111	189	344	393	1.28%	1.16%	1.81%	3.18%	3.97%
Total	8,702	9,586	10,469	10,834	9,894	100.00%	100.00%	100.00%	100.00%	100.00%

=== 2000 Census ===
As of the census of 2000, there were 10,469 people, 4,485 households, and 3,157 families residing in the county. The population density was 21 people per square mile (8.1 people/km^{2}). There were 7,659 housing units at an average density of 16 units per square mile (6.2/km^{2}). The racial makeup of the county was 87.85% White, 9.92% Black or African American, 0.41% Native American, 0.09% Asian, 0.03% Pacific Islander, 0.82% from other races, and 0.88% from two or more races. 1.81% of the population were Hispanic or Latino of any race.

There were 4,485 households, out of which 23.60% had children under the age of 18 living with them, 58.90% were married couples living together, 8.70% had a female householder with no husband present, and 29.60% were non-families. 27.00% of all households were made up of individuals, and 15.40% had someone living alone who was 65 years of age or older. The average household size was 2.31 and the average family size was 2.78.

In the county, the population was spread out, with 21.10% under the age of 18, 5.60% from 18 to 24, 21.10% from 25 to 44, 27.20% from 45 to 64, and 24.90% who were 65 years of age or older. The median age was 47 years. For every 100 females there were 93.40 males. For every 100 females age 18 and over, there were 92.70 males.

The median income for a household in the county was $27,198, and the median income for a family was $32,554. Males had a median income of $28,695 versus $21,141 for females. The per capita income for the county was $15,821. About 11.80% of families and 15.90% of the population were below the poverty line, including 23.90% of those under age 18 and 12.70% of those age 65 or over.

== Education ==
The following school districts serve Sabine County:

- Brookeland Independent School District (partial)
- Hemphill Independent School District
- Shelbyville Independent School District (partial)
- West Sabine Independent School District

The county is in the service area of Angelina College.

== Communities ==
=== Cities ===
- Hemphill (county seat)
- Pineland

=== Unincorporated areas ===
==== Census-designated places ====
- Milam

==== Unincorporated communities ====
- Bronson
- Brookeland (partly in Jasper County)
- Fairmount
- Geneva
- Isla
- Pendleton Harbor
- Rosevine
- Sexton
- Yellowpine

=== Historical communities ===
- Bayou
- East Mayfield
- Fairdale
- Gravehill
- Pendleton
- Plainview
- Sabinetown
- Tebo
- Time
- Vesta

== COVID-19 pandemic ==
In July 2021, Sabine County ranked the highest in the United States for cases of Coronavirus per 100,000 people.

== Politics ==
Sabine County has become a solidly Republican county since the beginning of the 21st century but previously leaned Democratic, voting for Bill Clinton in both 1992 and 1996 and also against Texan George H. W. Bush in 1988 and 1992.

Sabine County is represented in the Texas House of Representatives by Republican Travis Clardy.

United States presidential election results for Sabine County, Texas
Year	Republican		Democratic		Third party(ies)	
Year	No.	%	No.	%	No.	%
1912	19	3.70%	425	82.85%	69	13.45%
1916	22	2.90%	681	89.72%	56	7.38%
1920	61	6.19%	637	64.67%	287	29.14%
1924	61	5.01%	1,150	94.42%	7	0.57%
1928	419	34.18%	807	65.82%	0	0.00%
1932	57	3.08%	1,789	96.76%	3	0.16%
1936	108	8.14%	1,216	91.70%	2	0.15%
1940	157	8.80%	1,626	91.09%	2	0.11%
1944	203	14.01%	1,169	80.68%	77	5.31%
1948	104	7.26%	1,078	75.28%	250	17.46%
1952	729	31.67%	1,573	68.33%	0	0.00%
1956	801	46.71%	913	53.24%	1	0.06%
1960	619	33.59%	1,208	65.55%	16	0.87%
1964	428	19.19%	1,801	80.76%	1	0.04%
1968	455	18.44%	1,078	43.68%	935	37.88%
1972	1,333	58.64%	936	41.18%	4	0.18%
1976	904	27.43%	2,391	72.54%	1	0.03%
1980	1,387	40.82%	1,983	58.36%	28	0.82%
1984	2,045	51.21%	1,940	48.59%	8	0.20%
1988	1,925	48.28%	2,053	51.49%	9	0.23%
1992	1,490	31.85%	2,288	48.91%	900	19.24%
1996	1,660	42.29%	1,913	48.74%	352	8.97%
2000	2,764	60.20%	1,753	38.18%	74	1.61%
2004	3,138	67.64%	1,476	31.82%	25	0.54%
2008	3,749	76.92%	1,077	22.10%	48	0.98%
2012	3,727	81.41%	807	17.63%	44	0.96%
2016	3,998	85.96%	614	13.20%	39	0.84%
2020	4,784	87.12%	669	12.18%	38	0.69%
2024	4,972	89.09%	590	10.57%	19	0.34%

United States Senate election results for Sabine County, Texas1
Year	Republican		Democratic		Third party(ies)	
Year	No.	%	No.	%	No.	%
2024	4,864	87.80%	612	11.05%	64	1.16%

United States Senate election results for Sabine County, Texas2
Year	Republican		Democratic		Third party(ies)	
Year	No.	%	No.	%	No.	%
2020	4,678	86.04%	688	12.65%	71	1.31%

Texas Gubernatorial election results for Sabine County
Year	Republican		Democratic		Third party(ies)	
Year	No.	%	No.	%	No.	%
2022	3,755	90.16%	385	9.24%	25	0.60%

== See also ==
- National Register of Historic Places listings in Sabine County, Texas
- Recorded Texas Historic Landmarks in Sabine County
