= Milam, Texas =

- CDP
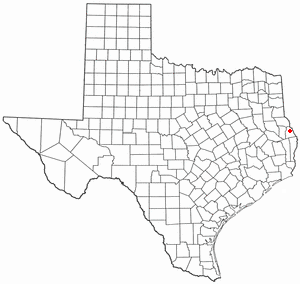
- Location of Milam, Texas

- Coordinates: 31°27′23″N 93°47′12″W
- Country: United States
- State: Texas
- County: Sabine

Area
  - Total: 33.4 sq mi (86.5 km^{2})
  - Land: 32.8 sq mi (85.0 km^{2})
  - Water: 0.58 sq mi (1.5 km^{2})
- Elevation: 259 ft (79 m)

Population (2020)
  - Total: 1,355
  - Density: 41.3/sq mi (15.9/km^{2})
- Time zone: UTC-6 (Central (CST))
  - Summer (DST): UTC-5 (CDT)
- ZIP codes: 75947, 75959
- Area code: 409
- FIPS code: 48-48324
- GNIS feature ID: 2408831

Milam is a census-designated place (CDP) in Sabine County, Texas, United States. It is located along the Sabine River at the junction of Highway 87 and Highway 21. The population was 1,355 at the 2020 census. Milam is the largest city in Sabine County.

== Historical development ==
With an approximate settling date of 1828, it was originally dubbed Red Mound, but was renamed again in honor of Benjamin Rush Milam (a famous figure in the Texas Revolution) when it became the municipal seat of Sabine County in 1836. Because an increasing number of residents wanted a more central location for the county seat, in 1858 they designated the newly platted town of Hemphill, Texas to fill that role. During the Civil War, the Confederate Army Quartermaster for Sabine County served from Milam.

== Geography ==
According to the United States Census Bureau, the CDP has a total area of 33.4 square miles (87 km^{2}), of which 32.8 square miles (85 km^{2}) is land and 0.6 square miles (1.6 km^{2}) (1.71%) is water.

=== Climate ===
The climate in this area is characterized by hot, humid summers and generally mild to cool winters. According to the Köppen Climate Classification system, Milam has a humid subtropical climate, abbreviated "Cfa" on climate maps.

== Demographics ==
Historical population
Census	Pop.	Note	%±
2000	1,329		—
2010	1,480		11.4%
2020	1,355		−8.4%
U.S. Decennial Census; 1850–1900 1910; 1920 1930 1940; 1950 1960 1970; 1980 1990 2000; 2010 2020

Milam first appeared as a census designated place in the 2000 U.S. census.

=== 2020 census ===
Milam CDP, Texas – Racial and ethnic composition Note: the US Census treats Hispanic/Latino as an ethnic category. This table excludes Latinos from the racial categories and assigns them to a separate category. Hispanics/Latinos may be of any race.
Race / Ethnicity (NH = Non-Hispanic)	Pop 2000	Pop 2010	Pop 2020	% 2000	% 2010	% 2020
White alone (NH)	1,198	1,320	1,181	90.14%	89.19%	87.16%
Black or African American alone (NH)	94	75	49	7.07%	5.07%	3.62%
Native American or Alaska Native alone (NH)	2	17	6	0.15%	1.15%	0.44%
Asian alone (NH)	5	8	8	0.38%	0.54%	0.59%
Native Hawaiian or Pacific Islander alone (NH)	1	0	0	0.08%	0.00%	0.00%
Other race alone (NH)	2	0	8	0.15%	0.00%	0.59%
Mixed race or Multiracial (NH)	9	20	47	0.68%	1.35%	3.47%
Hispanic or Latino (any race)	18	40	56	1.35%	2.70%	4.13%
Total	1,329	1,480	1,355	100.00%	100.00%	100.00%

As of the 2020 United States census, there were 1,355 people, 641 households, and 452 families residing in the CDP.

As of the census of 2000, there were 1,329 people, 608 households, and 424 families residing in the CDP. The population density was 40.5 inhabitants per square mile (15.6/km^{2}). There were 1,010 housing units at an average density of 30.8 per square mile (11.9/km^{2}). The racial makeup of the CDP was 90.90% White, 7.07% African American, 0.45% Native American, 0.38% Asian, 0.08% Pacific Islander, 0.30% from other races, and 0.83% from two or more races. Hispanic or Latino people of any race were 1.35% of the population.

There were 608 households, out of which 17.6% had children under the age of 18 living with them, 61.8% were married couples living together, 4.9% had a female householder with no husband present, and 30.1% were non-families. 28.0% of all households were made up of individuals, and 16.0% had someone living alone who was 65 years of age or older. The average household size was 2.19 and the average family size was 2.64.

In the CDP, the population was spread out, with 16.5% under the age of 18, 4.5% from 18 to 24, 17.4% from 25 to 44, 33.3% from 45 to 64, and 28.4% who were 65 years of age or older. The median age was 54 years. For every 100 females, there were 98.7 males. For every 100 females age 18 and over, there were 99.6 males.

The median income for a household in the CDP was $32,717, and the median income for a family was $38,077. Males had a median income of $27,159 versus $26,397 for females. The per capita income for the CDP was $20,155. About 6.4% of families and 10.8% of the population were below the poverty line, including 6.1% of those under age 18 and 11.9% of those age 65 or over.

== Education ==
Milam is served by the Hemphill Independent School District.
