= List of highways numbered 2 =

The following highways are numbered 2. For roads numbered A2, see list of A2 roads. For roads numbered B2, see the list of B2 roads. For roads numbered M2, see list of M2 roads. For roads numbered N2, see list of N2 roads.

== International ==
- AH2, between Indonesia and Iran
- E002 European route E002
- Trans-Sahara Highway

== Africa ==
=== Congo ===
- National Road 2 (Democratic Republic of the Congo)

=== Djibouti ===
- RN-2 (Djibouti)

=== Nigeria ===
- Nigeria Trunk Road A2

=== Senegal ===
- N2 road (Senegal)

=== South Africa ===
- N2 road (South Africa)
- M2 (Johannesburg)
- M2 (Pretoria)

=== Tanzania ===
- T2 road (Tanzania)

=== Zambia ===
- T2 road (Zambia)
- M2 road (Zambia)

== Asia ==
=== Bangladesh ===
N2 (Bangladesh)

=== Cambodia ===
National Highway 2 (Cambodia)

=== Hong Kong ===
- Route 2 (Hong Kong)

=== India ===
- National Highway 2 (India)
  - State Highway 2 (Rajasthan)
  - State Highway 2 (Andhra Pradesh)
  - State Highway 2 (West Bengal)

=== Indonesia ===
- Indonesian National Route 2

=== Iran ===
- Freeway 2 (Iran)

=== Iraq ===
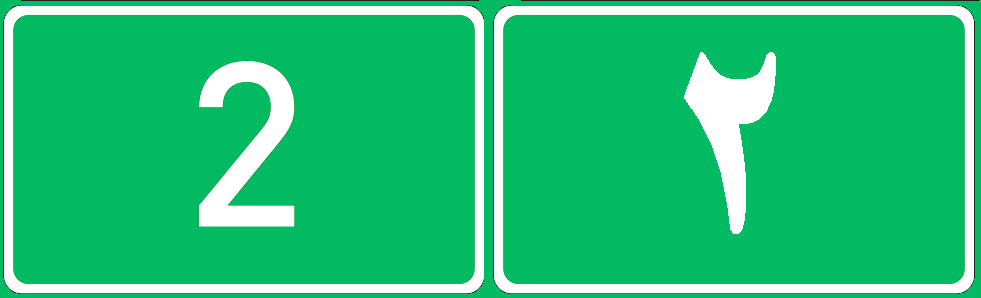
- Highway 2 (Iraq)

=== Israel ===
- Highway 2 (Israel)

=== Japan ===
- National Route 2
- San'yō Expressway
  - Chūgoku Expressway
  - Kanmon Bridge
- Route 2 (Shuto Expressway)
- Route 2 (Nagoya Expressway)
- Route 2 (Hanshin Expressway)

=== Malaysia ===
- North–South Expressway Southern Route
- FT 2 Malaysia Federal Route 2
- M2 Jalan Durian Tunggal–Tangkak

=== Myanmar ===
National Highway 2 (Myanmar)

=== Oman ===
- Route 2 (Oman)

=== Pakistan ===
- M-2 motorway (Pakistan)

=== Philippines ===
- C-2 Circumferential Road 2
- R-2 Radial Road 2
- N2 highway (Philippines)
- E2 expressway (Philippines)

=== Sri Lanka ===
- A2 Galle Road
- E02 Colombo Inter-provincial Orbital Router

=== South Korea ===
- National Route 2

=== Taiwan ===
- National Freeway 2
  - Provincial Highway 2 (Taiwan)

=== Thailand ===
- Thailand Route 2

=== Turkey ===
- O-2

== Europe ==
=== Albania ===
- SH2

=== Austria ===
- A 2 (Süd Autobahn)

=== Belarus ===
- M2 highway (Belarus)

=== Belgium ===
- R2 road (Belgium)

=== Bulgaria ===
- I-2 road
- A 2 (Hemus motorway)

=== Czech Republic ===
- D2 motorway

=== Estonia ===
- T2

=== Finland ===
- Finnish national road 2
- Åland Islands Highway 2

=== France ===
- Autoroute A2 (french)
- Route nationale 2 (french)

=== Germany ===
- Bundesautobahn 2
- Bundesstraße 2

=== Greece ===
- A2
- EO2 road

=== Hungary ===
- M2 expressway (Hungary)
- Main road 2 (Hungary)

=== Ireland ===
- M2
- N2 road (Ireland)

=== Italy ===
- Autostrada A2
  - Autostrada A2 (1962–1988)
- RA 2
- T2
- State road 2

=== Moldova ===
- R 2
- M 2 / E584

=== Netherlands ===
- Rijksweg 2

=== Poland ===
- National road 2 (DK2)
- Motorway of Freedom (A2/E30)
- expressway S2

=== Portugal ===
- A2 motorway (Portugal)

=== Romania ===
- DN2
  - DN2A
  - DN2B
- A2 motorway

=== Russia ===
- M2 highway (Russia)

=== United Kingdom ===
- M2 motorway (Great Britain)
- A2 road (England)
- M2 motorway (Northern Ireland)
- A2 road (Northern Ireland)

=== Ukraine ===
- Highway M02 (Ukraine)

== North America ==
=== Canada ===
==== Alberta ====
- Alberta Highway 2

==== British Columbia ====
- British Columbia Highway 2

==== Manitoba ====
- Manitoba Highway 2

==== New Brunswick ====
- New Brunswick Route 2

==== Newfoundland and Labrador ====
- Newfoundland and Labrador Route 2

==== Northwest Territories ====
- Northwest Territories Highway 2

==== Nova Scotia ====
- Nova Scotia Trunk 2

==== Ontario ====
- Ontario Highway 2

==== Prince Edward Island ====
- Prince Edward Island Route 2

==== Quebec ====
- Quebec Route 2

==== Saskatchewan ====
- Saskatchewan Highway 2

==== Yukon ====
- Yukon Highway 2

=== Costa Rica ===
- National Route 2

=== Cuba ===
- Autopista A2
- Highway 1–2
- Highway I–2
  - Highway 2–I–2
  - Highway 3–I–2
  - Highway 4–I–2

=== Dominican Republic ===
- DR-2

=== Mexico ===
- Mexican Federal Highway 2

=== United States ===
- Interstate 2
- U.S. Route 2
- New England Interstate Route 2 (former)

==== Alabama ====
- Alabama State Route 2

==== Alaska ====
- Interstate A-2 (unsigned)
- Alaska Route 2

==== Arkansas ====
- Arkansas Highway 2

==== California ====
- California State Route 2
  - County Route A2 (California)
  - County Route B2 (California)
  - County Route D2 (California)
  - County Route E2 (California)
  - County Route G2 (California)
  - County Route J2 (California)
  - County Route N2 (California)
  - County Route R2 (California)
  - County Route S2 (California)

==== Colorado ====
- Colorado State Highway 2

==== Connecticut ====
- Connecticut Route 2

==== Delaware ====
- Delaware Route 2

==== Florida ====
- Florida State Road 2
  - County Road 2 (Nassau County, Florida)
  - County Road 2 (Okaloosa County, Florida)
    - County Road 2B (Okaloosa County, Florida)
  - County Road 2 (Walton County, Florida)

==== Georgia ====
- Georgia State Route 2

==== Hawaii ====
- Interstate H-2

==== Illinois ====
- Illinois Route 2

==== Indiana ====
- Indiana State Road 2

==== Iowa ====
- Iowa Highway 2

==== Kansas ====
- K-2 (Kansas highway)

==== Kentucky ====
- Kentucky Route 2

==== Louisiana ====
- Louisiana Highway 2
  - Louisiana State Route 2 (former)

==== Maryland ====
- Maryland Route 2

==== Massachusetts ====
- Massachusetts Route 2

==== Minnesota ====
- County Road 2 (Goodhue County, Minnesota)
- County Road 2 (Hennepin County, Minnesota)
- County Road 2 (Pine County, Minnesota)
- County Road 2 (Scott County, Minnesota)
- County Road 2 (Washington County, Minnesota)

==== Mississippi ====
- Mississippi Highway 2

==== Missouri ====
- Missouri Route 2
  - Missouri Route 2 (1922)

==== Montana ====
- Montana Highway 2

==== Nebraska ====
- Nebraska Highway 2
  - Nebraska Spur 2B
  - Nebraska Recreation Road 2D

==== Nevada ====
- Nevada State Route 2
  - Nevada State Route 2B
  - Nevada State Route 2C

==== New Jersey ====
- New Jersey Route 2
  - New Jersey Route 2N
  - County Route 2 (Monmouth County, New Jersey)

==== New Mexico ====
- New Mexico State Road 2

==== New York ====
- New York State Route 2
  - County Route 2 (Allegany County, New York)
  - County Route 2 (Chemung County, New York)
  - County Route 2 (Chenango County, New York)
  - County Route 2 (Clinton County, New York)
  - County Route 2 (Columbia County, New York)
  - County Route 2 (Delaware County, New York)
  - County Route 2 (Dutchess County, New York)
  - County Route 2 (Erie County, New York)
  - County Route 2 (Essex County, New York)
  - County Route 2 (Franklin County, New York)
  - County Route 2 (Genesee County, New York)
  - County Route 2 (Lewis County, New York)
  - County Route 2 (Madison County, New York)
  - County Route 2 (Monroe County, New York)
  - County Route 2 (Nassau County, New York)
  - County Route 2 (Niagara County, New York)
  - County Route 2 (Oneida County, New York)
  - County Route 2 (Onondaga County, New York)
  - County Route 2 (Ontario County, New York)
  - County Route 2 (Oswego County, New York)
  - County Route 2 (Rensselaer County, New York)
  - County Route 2 (Steuben County, New York)
  - County Route 2 (Suffolk County, New York)
  - County Route 2 (Washington County, New York)
  - County Route 2 (Yates County, New York)

==== North Carolina ====
- North Carolina Highway 2

==== North Dakota ====
- U.S. Route 2N
- U.S. Route 2S

==== Ohio ====
- Ohio State Route 2

==== Oklahoma ====
- Oklahoma State Highway 2

==== Oregon ====
- Oregon Route 2

==== Pennsylvania ====
- Pennsylvania Route 2

==== Rhode Island ====
- Rhode Island Route 2

==== South Carolina ====
- South Carolina Highway 2

==== Tennessee ====
- Tennessee State Route 2

==== Texas ====
- Texas State Highway 2
  - Texas State Highway Loop 2
  - Farm to Market Road 2
  - Texas Park Road 2
  - Texas Recreational Road 2

==== Utah ====
- Utah State Route 2 (1962-1977)
- Utah State Route 2 (1920s-1962)

==== Vermont ====
- Vermont Route 2B

==== Virginia ====
- Virginia State Route 2

==== Washington ====
- Washington State Highway 2

==== West Virginia ====
- West Virginia Route 2

==== Puerto Rico ====
- Interstate PR-2 (unsigned)
- Puerto Rico Highway 2
  - Puerto Rico Highway 2R

==== Guam ====
- Guam Highway 2

== Oceania ==
=== Australia ===
==== New South Wales ====
- M2 Hills Motorway
- Lane Cove Tunnel
- Windsor Road, Sydney
- Gold Coast Highway

==== Northern Territory ====
- Namatjira Drive

==== Queensland ====
  - Ipswich Motorway (Brisbane)
  - Warrego Highway (Brisbane)
  - Logan Motorway (Brisbane)
  - Gateway Motorway (Brisbane)
- Warrego ( Toowoomba Bypass), Landsborough, and Barkly Highways (Queensland)
- Warrego and Mitchell Highway
- Gold Coast Highway
- Brisbane

==== South Australia ====
  - Southern Expressway
  - North–South Motorway
  - Northern Expressway
  - South Road, Adelaide

==== Tasmania ====
- Bass Highway, Tasmania

==== Victoria ====
- Tullamarine Freeway
- CityLink

==== Western Australia ====
- State Route 2 (Western Australia) – Mitchell Freeway, Kwinana Freeway, and Forrest Highway

=== New Zealand ===
- New Zealand State Highway 2

== South America ==
=== Argentina ===
- Buenos Aires Provincial Route 2

=== Bolivia ===
- National Route 2 (Bolivia)

=== Paraguay ===
- National Route 2

=== Peru ===
- Peru Highway 2

=== Uruguay ===
- Route 2 Grito de Asencio

== See also ==
- List of highways numbered 2A
- List of highways numbered 2N

Preceded by 1	Lists of highways 2	Succeeded by 3
