= Caddo Lake State Park =

Lakeside state park in eastern Texas

- IUCN category IV (habitat/species management area)
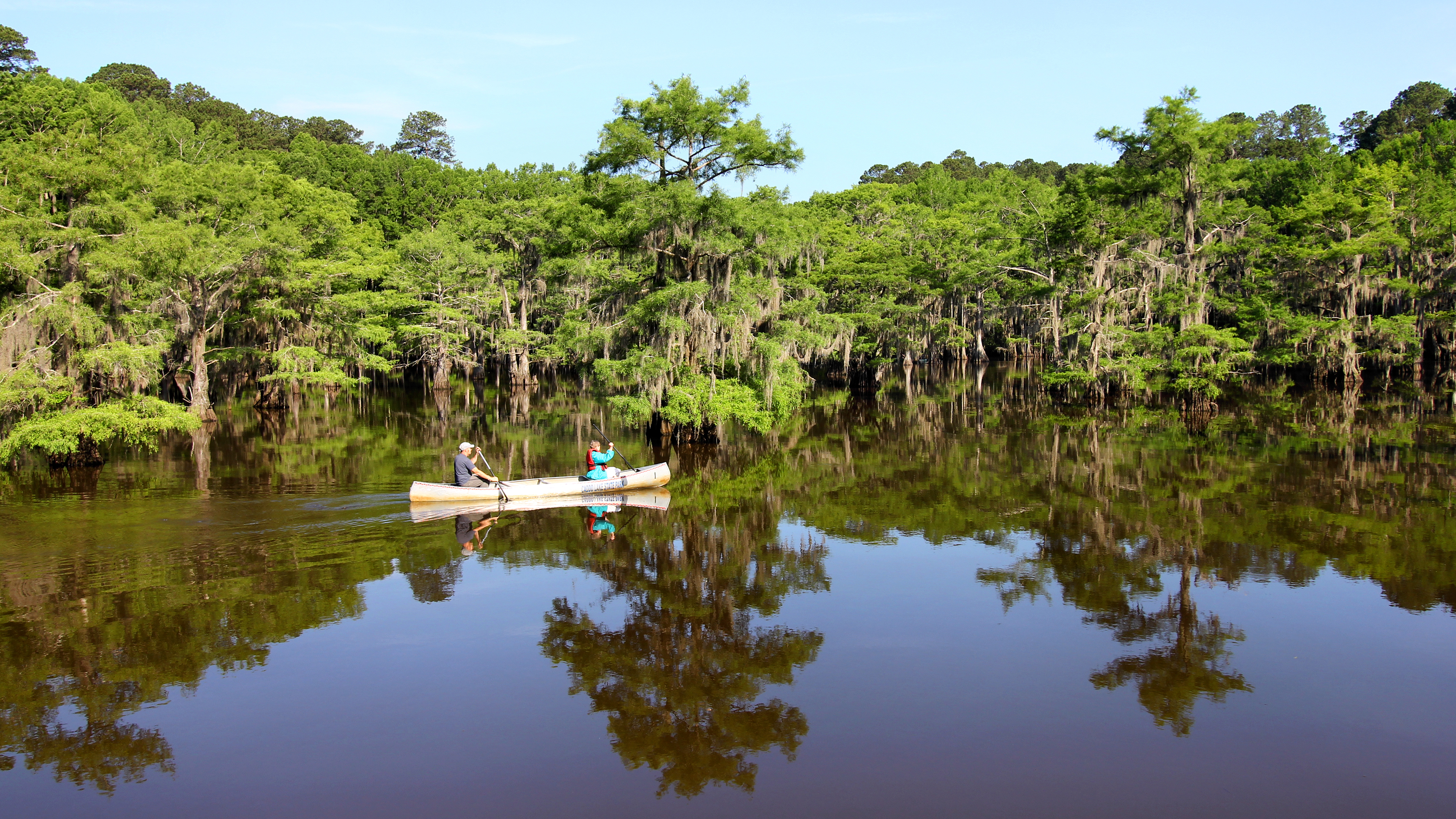
- Saw Mill Pond

- Location within Texas
- Location: Harrison County, East Texas, Texas, United States
- Nearest city: Karnack, Texas
- Coordinates: 32°41′27″N 094°10′45″W
- Area: 484 acres (196 ha)
- Elevation: 237 ft (72 m)
- Established: June 1933
- Named for: the Caddo tribe who inhabited the area
- Visitors: 82,125 (in 2025)
- Governing body: Texas Parks and Wildlife Department
- Website: Caddo Lake State Park

Caddo Lake State Park is a state park located in the piney woods ecoregion of East Texas. The park consists of 484 acres (196 ha) on Big Cypress Bayou, west of Caddo Lake itself, in Harrison County, near Karnack, Texas. The park opened in 1934 and is managed by the Texas Parks and Wildlife Department. There are two separate units, Caddo Wildlife Management Area and Caddo Lake National Wildlife Refuge, nearby.

== History ==
=== Early inhabitants and exploration ===
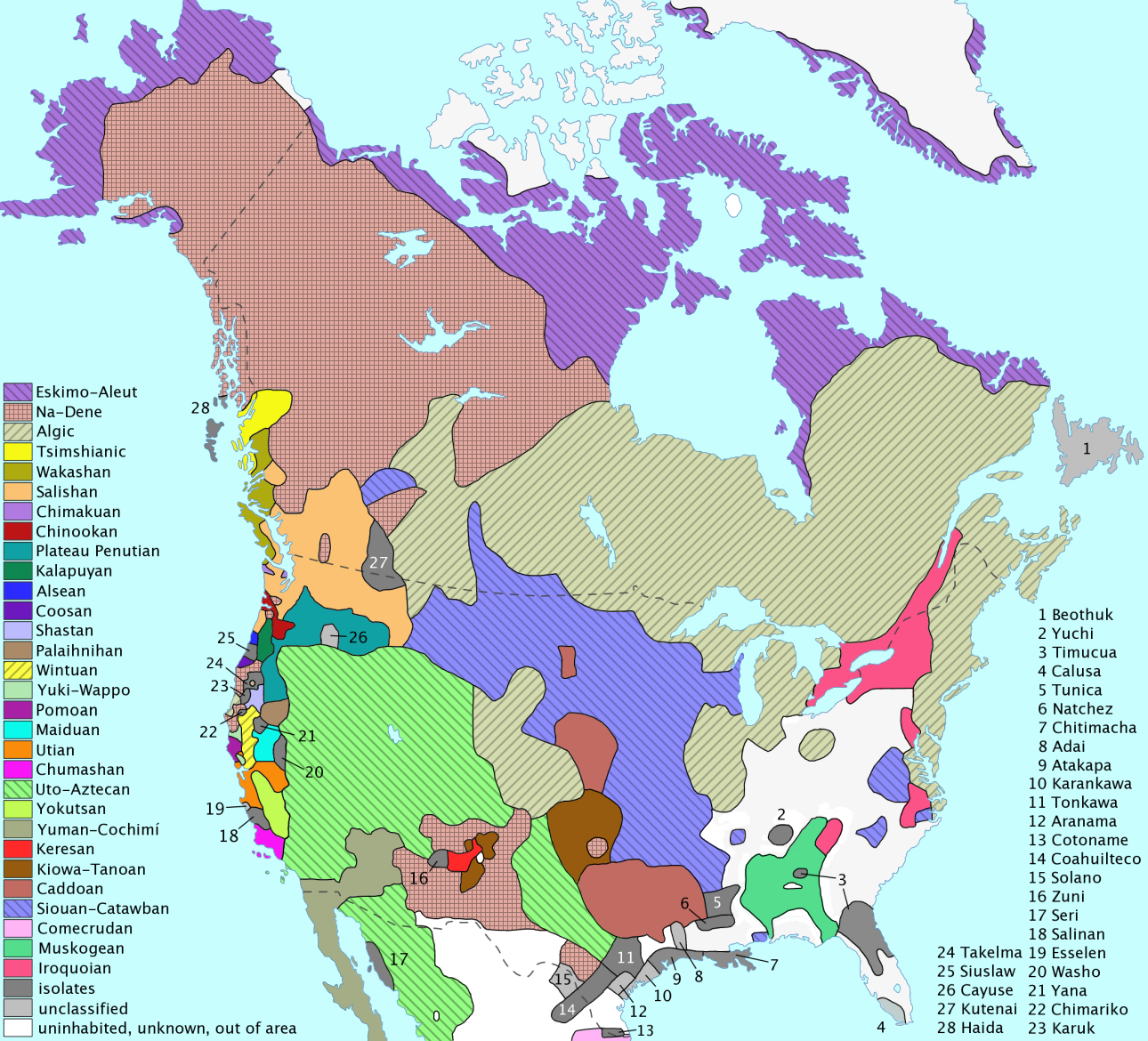
A map of the Native American language families in Canada and the United States

The first humans settled in the area near the park around 10,000 BC. For several centuries, these people used the marshlands of Caddo Lake to gather food. Sometime around 800 AD, the first Caddo settlements appeared in the area. At the time, the tribes in the region were not a connected nation, instead being a large collection of close-knit, peaceful gathering communities. Over time, the Caddo communities grew and prospered, becoming a highly farming community by at least 1200 AD, learning to grow crops such as maize (corn).

In 1542, the Francisco de Soto expedition, led by Luis de Moscoso Alvarado due to De Soto's death earlier in the expedition, discovered the complex Caddoan society. They sent back the first descriptions of the Caddo. Several more European expeditions explored the area around the park throughout the 1600s. The Spanish established several Missions and trading-posts during the 1700s, and numerous epidemics caused by the European settlements virtually wiped out the Caddo that inhabited the area. They used the nearby Red River for trading.

=== 1800s ===
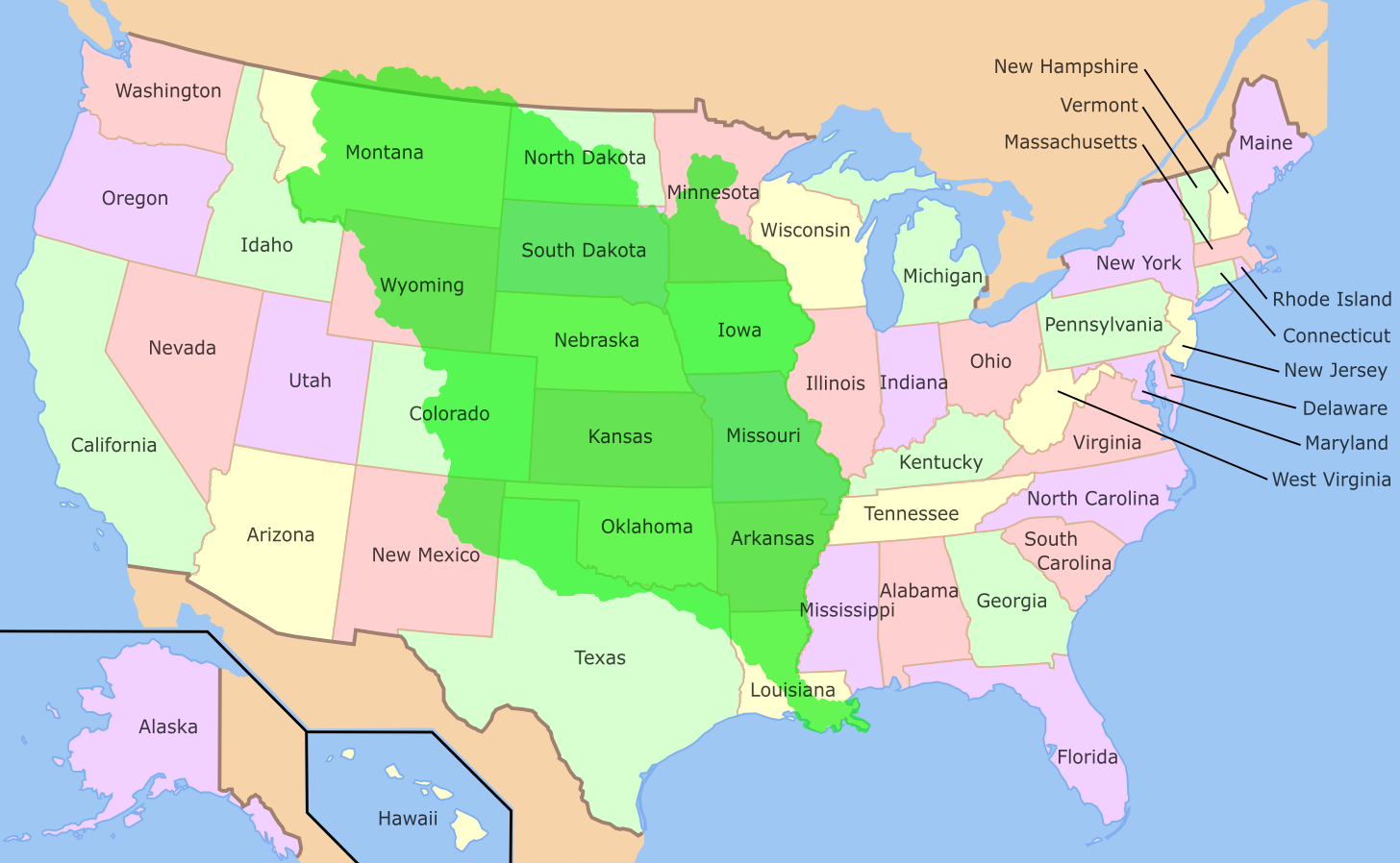
A map of the United States, with the Louisiana Territory highlighted in green

==== 1800–1812 ====
In 1800, as part of the secret Treaty of San Ildefonso, Spain, who had been defeated in the Napoleonic Wars, was forced to return Louisiana to France. France regained Louisiana in 1802, two years later. This treaty did not establish the borders of Louisiana, which would lead to issues just a short while later. In early 1803, diplomat James Monroe was sent to France to negotiate purchasing Louisiana from France. Louisiana was bought from France later that year. This was known as the Louisiana Purchase, which doubled the size of the United States. The northeastern part of Texas was thought to be included in the purchase. There was no official border between Louisiana and Texas, which caused disputes between Spain and the United States. In 1806, United States General James Wilkinson and Spanish Lieutenant Colonel Simón de Herrera attempted to negotiate establishing a border between the two nations. On November 5, 1806, an agreement was made to establish a Neutral territory between the two countries. The neutral territory did not have official borders, and the Caddo Lake area was likely located within the territory. Because the territory was not possessed by either nation, neither of them could enforce laws in the territory, so it became popular with outlaws and escaped slaves. In both 1810 and 1812, the two nations sent joint military expeditions into the Neutral Territory to expel the outlaws inhabiting it.

==== Formation of Caddo Lake ====
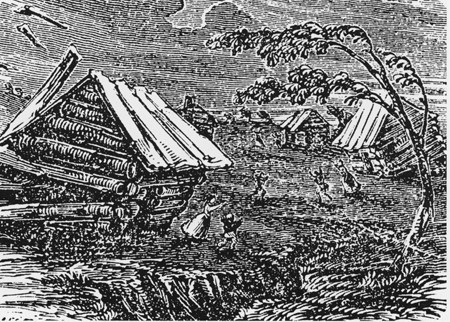
A wood engraving showing the effects of the 1811–12 New Madrid earthquakes

Although the exact date of the formation of Caddo Lake is unknown, both of the major theories behind the lake's origins date back to the early 1800s. The Caddo legend behind the formation of the lake is that the Great Spirit caused an earthquake after one of the Caddo chiefs failed to obey him. The earthquake filled and formed the lake. The earthquake being described in the story is the 1812 New Madrid earthquake, which is believed by some geologists to have caused the creation of the lake. The theory behind the earthquake creating Caddo Lake is that the earthquake's seismic waves caused the ground to sink, which filled up and became the lake. The additional theory behind the creation of Caddo Lake was that it formed because of the Great Raft. The Great Raft was a large log jam that blocked the flow of the Red River, as well as a few smaller rivers. The jam was first reported by early Spanish explorers in the 1500s, but was not studied until the early 1800s. It is believed that Caddo Lake was formed by the Great Raft acting as a natural dam, and the first studies of this were reported around 1806.

==== 1819–1829 ====
In 1819, the Adams-Onis Treaty was signed, which established the border between Spanish Texas and Louisiana. The border between the two was set along the Sabine River and the 32nd parallel, which placed the Caddo Lake Area within the borders of Texas. In 1821, after 11 years of fighting, the Spanish territory of Mexico won its independence. This included the area of the present-day Caddo Lake state park. Winning the Texas Revolution allowed the Republic of Texas to become independent from Mexico and be annexed by the United States.

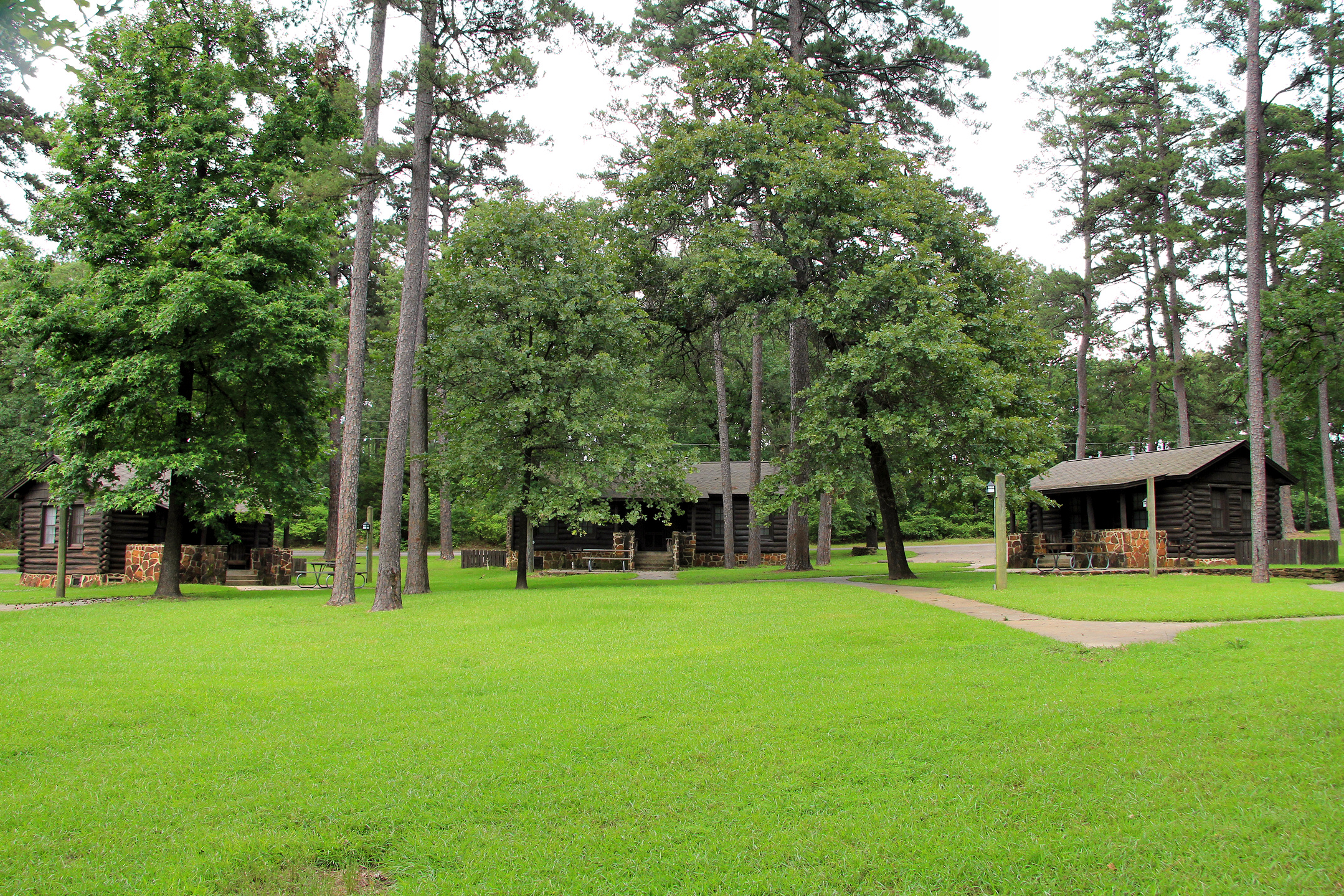
Cabins built by the CCC.

=== 1900s ===
==== 1931–1937 ====
The 1931 Texas Legislature dedicated state property at Caddo Lake as a public park. Land was donated by various institutions and individuals between 1933 and 1937, the bulk coming from a gift of 385 acres by Thomas Jefferson Taylor II. Civilian Conservation Corps (CCC) Company 889 began development of the park in 1933. They began building entrance portals, Texas Park Road 2, trails, a shelter house, a boat house, nine cabins, a concession building (currently the group recreation hall), picnic sites, culverts, vehicle bridges, and a well house. CCC Company 857 finished the work in 1937.

== Natural features ==
Saw Mill Pond is a shallow bald cypress swamp at the north end of the park. The pond empties into Big Cypress Bayou. The pond is popular for canoeing, kayaking and fishing.

=== Animals ===
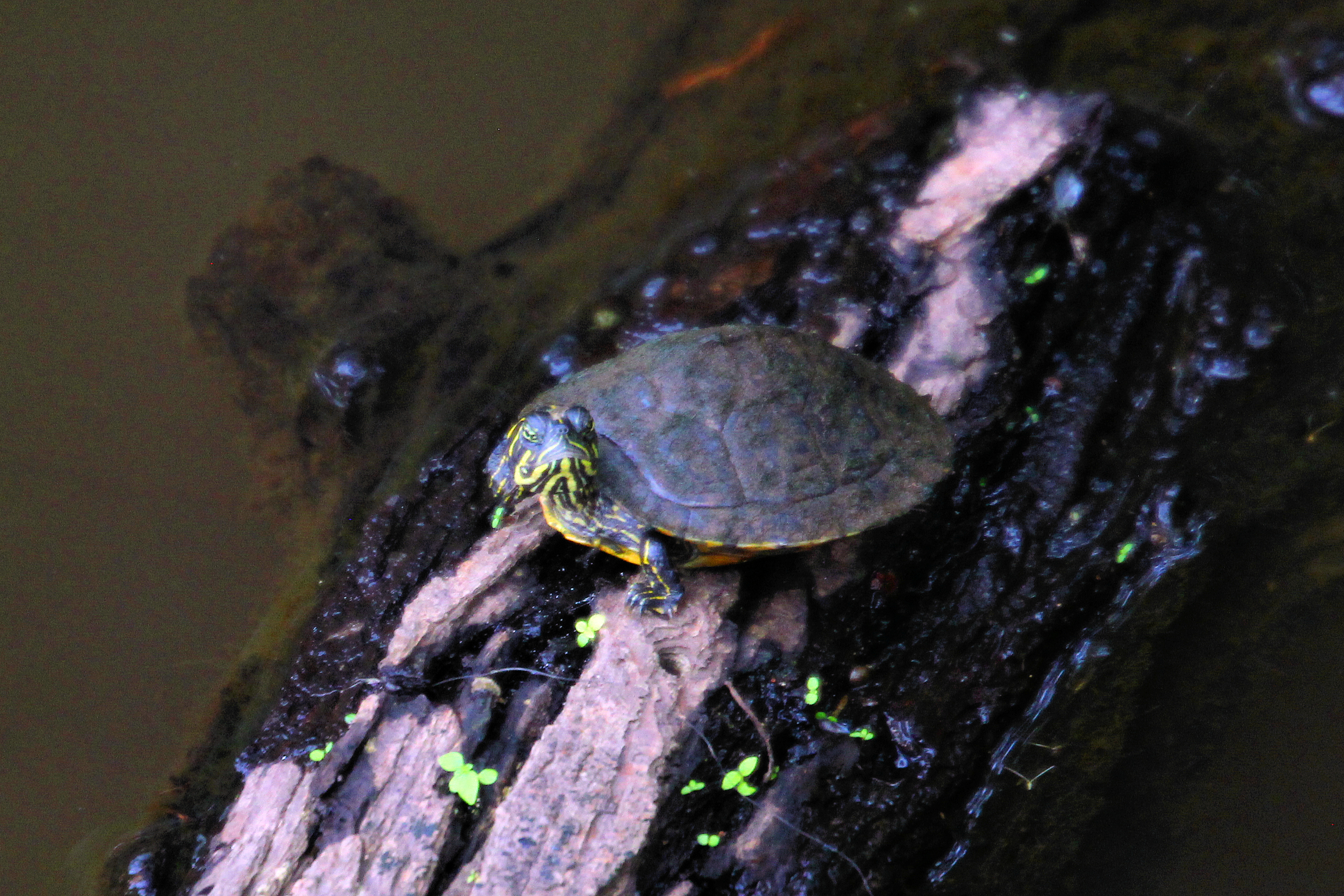
A river cooter (Pseudemys concinna) in the park.

Reptiles to watch out for are American alligator, river cooter, eastern copperhead, speckled kingsnake, plain-bellied watersnake. Some amphibians documented include southern leopard frog, Blanchard's cricket frog, and various chorus frogs. Mammals such as common raccoon, American mink, coypu, North American beaver, eastern gray squirrel, Mexican long-nosed armadillo, and white-tailed deer inhabit the park.

The park hosts many species of migratory birds throughout the year. Permanent residents that are commonly sighted are mourning dove, great blue heron, turkey vulture, black vulture, red-shouldered hawk, barred owl, red-bellied woodpecker, downy woodpecker, pileated woodpecker, blue jay, American crow, fish crow, Carolina chickadee, tufted titmouse, Carolina wren, eastern bluebird, northern mockingbird, red-winged blackbird, pine warbler, and northern cardinal.

=== Plants ===
Naturalists can enjoy stately baldcypress, loblolly pine, shortleaf pine, American sweetgum, red maple, American beautyberry, giant cane, American pawpaw, American lotus, greenbriar and water lilies.

== Nearby attractions ==
The following historic site is located within 30 miles (48 km) of Caddo Lake State Park:

- Starr Family Home State Historic Site (Harrison County)

== Gallery ==
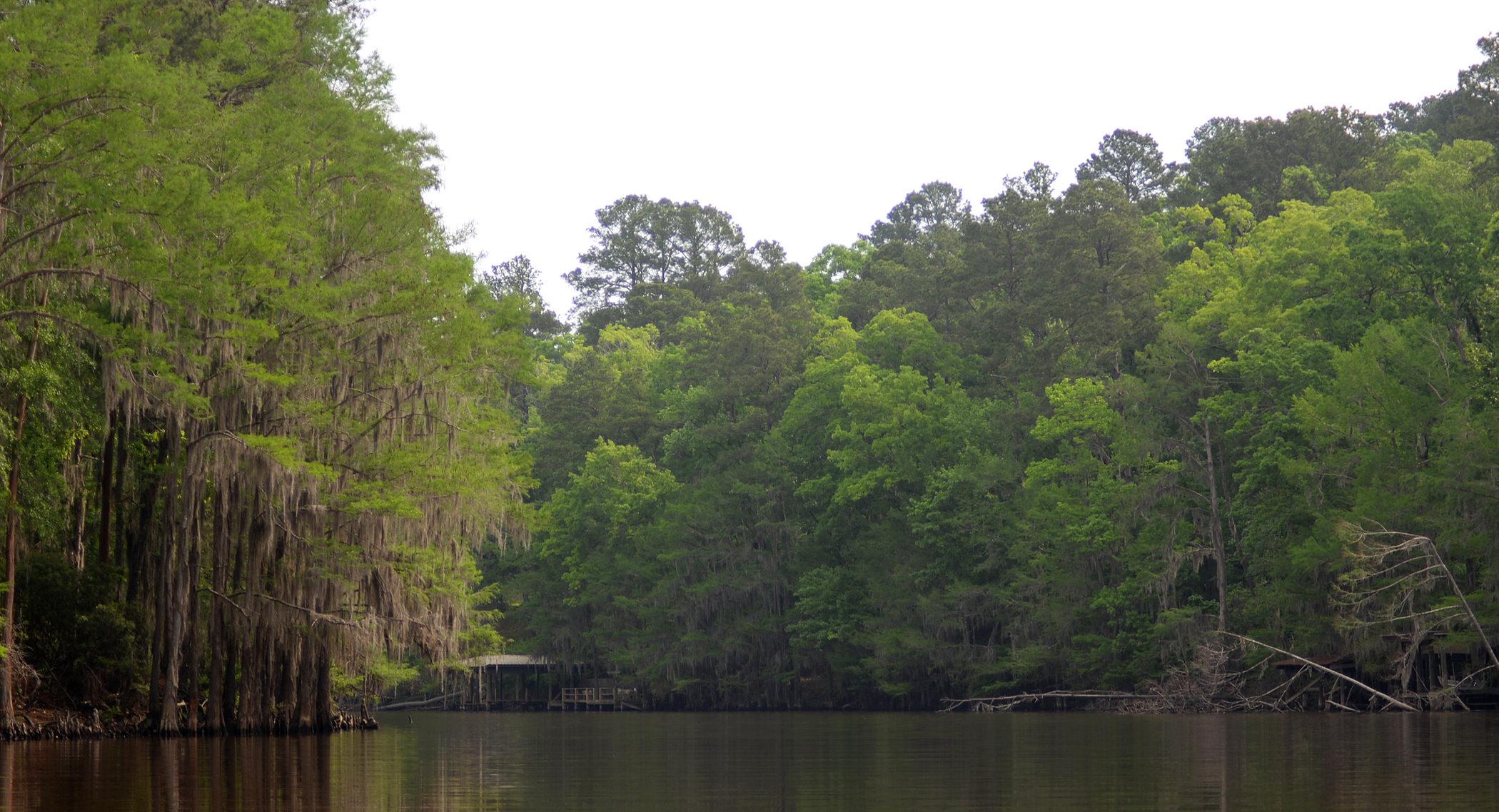
Big Cypress Bayou, Caddo Lake State Park, Harrison Co., TX, US (April 2017)

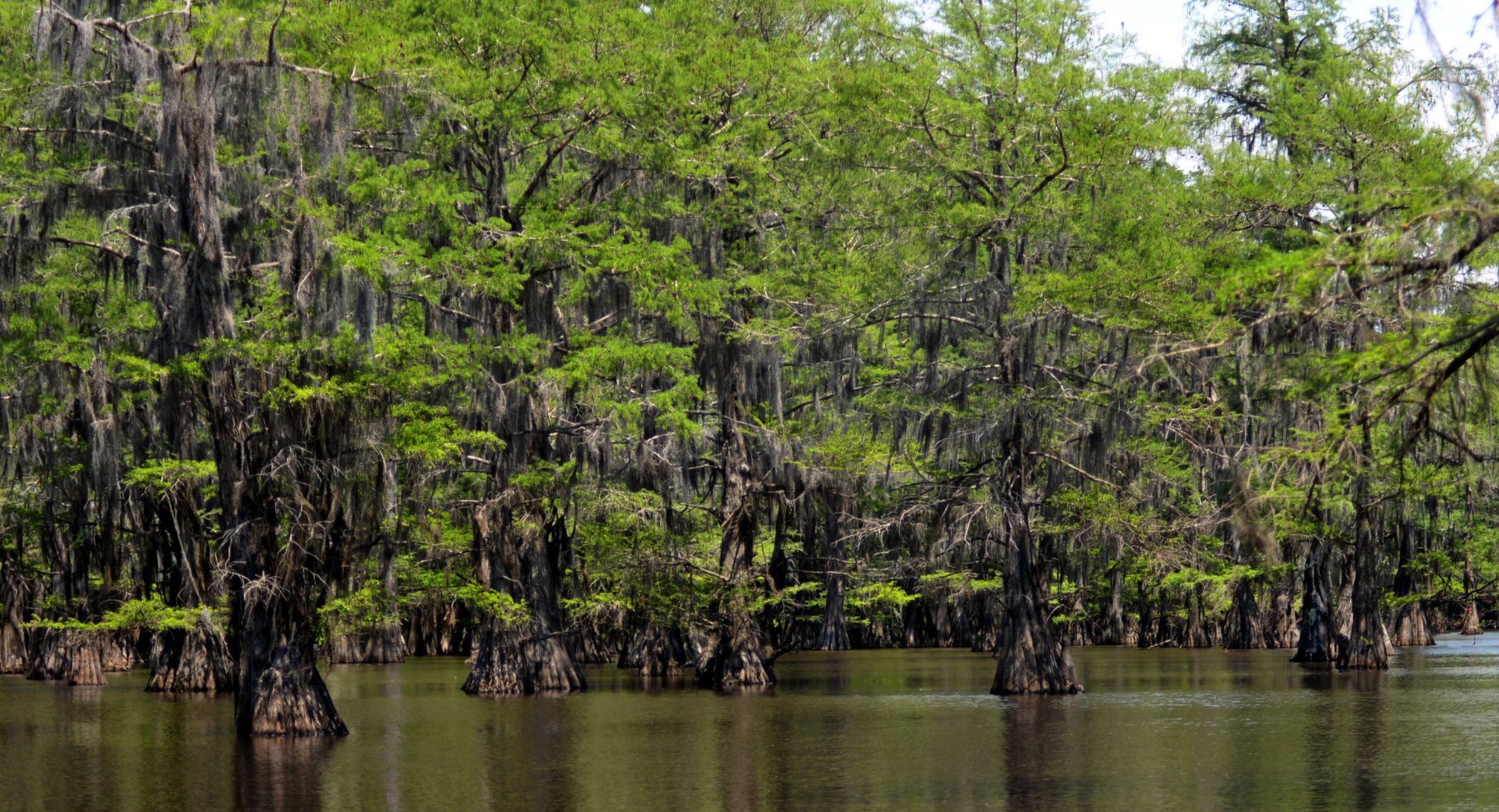
Bald cypress (Taxodium distichum), Saw Mill Pond, Caddo Lake State Park (April 2017)

== See also ==
- List of Texas state parks
- Caddo Lake National Wildlife Refuge
