= Longhorn Army Ammunition Plant =

Coordinates: 32.6725°N 94.1281°W

- Active: 1942–1997
- Country: United States
- Website: https://www.jmc.army.mil/

The Longhorn Army Ammunition Plant (LOW) was a 8,493-acre (34.37 km^{2}) government-owned, contractor-operated (GOCO) facility in Karnack, Texas that was established in 1942. The Monsanto Chemical Company selected the site in December 1941 to produce TNT. The plant produced 393,000,000 pounds of TNT throughout World War II. After the signing of the Intermediate-Range Nuclear Forces Treaty on December 8, 1987, the Longhorn plant was used to destroy Pershing 1a and Pershing II missiles. The plant was operated by Thiokol.

The property was transferred to the U.S. Fish & Wildlife Service in 2000 to become the Caddo Lake National Wildlife Refuge.

== Environment ==
The Longhorn Army Ammunition Plant was listed as a Superfund site on the National Priorities List on August 30, 1990. The United States Environmental Protection Agency listed the primary contaminants of concern as solvents used at the site. Methylene chloride and trichloroethene were detected in the groundwater on the plant, but were only detected in limited amounts in streams flowing into Caddo Lake. The groundwater, surface water, and soil on the plant have been found to be contaminated with perchlorate. Sediment samples from streams near Caddo Lake found elevated levels of lead and mercury. Cleanup activities began on October 25, 1996 and continue to this day.
