= List of B2 roads =

This is a list of roads designated B2. Roads are sorted in the countries' alphabetical order.

- B2 road (Cyprus)
- B2 highway (Germany), a road connecting the Polish border near Gartz and the Austrian border near Garmisch-Partenkirchen
- B2 road (Jamaica), a road connecting Bog Walk and White Hall
- B2 road (Namibia), part of the Trans-Kalahari Highway, connecting Walvis Bay and Okahandja
- B2 road (Sri Lanka), road connecting Akkaraipattu and Sagamam
- B2 road (United Kingdom) may refer to:
  - B2 road (Northern Ireland), a road connecting Portadown and Downpatrick

== See also ==
- List of highways numbered 2, a disambiguation page
- List of A2 roads, a disambiguation page
