= List of highways numbered 2A =

Highway 2A may refer to:

== Canada ==
- Alberta Highway 2A
- Ontario Highway 2A (former)

== India ==
- National Highway 2A (India)

== Malaysia ==
- FT 2A Persiaran Raja Muda Musa

== United States ==
- U.S. Route 2A
- New England Route 2A (former)
- Connecticut Route 2A
- Massachusetts Route 2A
- Nevada State Route 2A
- New York State Route 2A (mid-1920s–1927)
- New York State Route 2A (1930–1939)
- New York State Route 2A (1939 – early 1940s)
- Vermont Route 2A

Territories

- Guam Highway 2A

== See also ==
- List of highways numbered 2

Preceded by 2	Lists of highways 2A	Succeeded by 2N
