= Battle of Debecka Pass =

2003 battle of the Iraq War

- Part of 2003 Invasion of Iraq
Date	6–7 April 2003
Location	Erbil Governorate, Iraq; 35°53′03″N 43°47′02″E
Result	U.S. and Peshmerga victory

Belligerents
United States; Peshmerga	Iraq

Strength
26 U.S. Special Forces Operators; 3 Air Force Combat Controllers; 2 Military Intelligence Operators about 150 Kurdish fighters	A motorized company (about 100 soldiers)

Casualties and losses
4 killed (Kurdistan Region) 18 killed, 45 wounded (friendly fire) (Note: As Iraqi forces were advancing, U.S. forces requested emergency airstrikes as they were running out of Javelin missiles and small arms could not penetrade the T-55s and MT-LB APCs. The airstrike group consisted of 2 F-14 Tomcats armed with Paveway laser guided bombs, which misidentified U.S. and Peshmerga forces as their targets.)	5 T-55 tanks, 8 armoured personnel carriers, 4 troop trucks, at least 90 soldiers killed, 20 captured

The Battle of Debecka Pass (Dibagah, Dibege, دیبه‌گه) on 6–7 April 2003, sometimes known as the Battle of Debecka Ridge or Debecka Crossroads, or otherwise referred to as the Alamo of the Iraq War, was a successful operation launched by U.S. Special Forces to secure a major crossroads near the village of Debecka (Dibege, دیبه‌گه in Kurdish), between Mosul and Kirkuk in northern Iraq. It was notable for its use of the Raytheon/Lockheed-Martin Javelin anti-tank missile. The weapon demonstrated how lethal and crucial technology can be in determining the outcome of a battle.

The light unarmored SOF and Peshmerga (KDP) force faced a mechanized force of Iraqi infantry and tanks. The U.S. and KDP force was able to defeat the Iraqi mechanized infantry and tank force with combined air-to-ground strikes, superior maneuvering, and the use of the Javelin missiles. An exception to the general tempo of the 2003 invasion, Iraqi forces put up a stiff resistance and had been able to hold off US and Peshmerga force for a day until they were overwhelmed with airstrikes and missiles.

== Objective ==
This battle was one of a 4-pronged simultaneous assault across the battlefield south of Erbil. Emboldened by successful U.S. Special Forces operations in the vicinity of Aski Kalak, Kurdish forces attempted an independent assault on 5 April that was repelled. Upon hearing this, the AOB 040 CDR quickly deployed to that location to meet with the Peshmerga general. They agreed upon a combined assault across a broad front at daybreak. The objective vicinity Debeka pass was labeled Objective Rock. The force assigned to secure OBJ Rock consisted of ODA 044, ODA 391, and ODA 392. The 26 United States Army Special Forces Green Berets were divided into two A-teams; ODA 391 & ODA 392, and 150 Peshmerga who were equipped with GMVs (Ground Mobility Vehicles)-modified Humvees with .50-caliber HMGs and Mark 19 grenade launchers that could travel a thousand miles without resupply.

The ODAs conducted battle training in Fort Bragg, North Carolina, and Fort Pickett, Virginia, between October and December 2002. On 8 March 2003, the ODAs flew from Pope Air Force Base to Romania, and on 26 March 2003, they infiltrated northern Iraq via an MC-130 Combat Talon landing at Al-Sulaymaniya, some 60 miles east of Kirkuk. In their first few days in Iraq, they participated in Operation Viking Hammer. On 1 April 2003, they moved to Irbil and onto a staging area where they linked up with ODA 044, 10th SFG, and their Peshmerga allies. On 4 April 2003, they were given a new mission, codenamed Northern Safari.

On 6 April 2003, the 26 Green Berets were given the task to capture a strategically important junction between Mosul and Kirkuk, near the village of Debecka (Dibege, دیبه‌گه in Kurdish). Were it captured, it would sever Highway 2 and impede Iraqi movement in the north, as well as provide a springboard to eventually drive on and capture the important Kirkuk oil fields. They were to seize the Debecka intersection until relieved by the 173rd Airborne Brigade's artillery component.

== The battle ==
On the eighteenth day of the U.S.-led invasion of Iraq, U.S. special forces moved in for the attack. The battle began with an aerial bombardment from B-52 bombers. Green Berets from ODA 044 with 150 Peshmerga fighters advanced towards Objective Rock—a T-junction leading to the crossroads and the town of Debecka. ODA 391 and 392 would provide fire support for supported ODA 044 and the Peshmerga; to their immediate north, two groups of 500 Peshmerga fighters advanced on the ridgeline; further North, ODA 043, with 150 Kurds, supported by ODAs 394 and 395 acting as fire support attacked Objective Stone—a commanding hilltop occupied by Iraqi forces.

The central column of 500 Peshmerga reached the ridgeline; only running into token resistance, they seized their sector of the ridgeline. ODAs 394 and 395 began suppressing the defenders of Objective Stone, after a scheduled airstrike failed to soften up the Iraqi defenses, causing the Peshmerga to initially refuse to attack the objective. The two ODAs were engaged by Iraqi heavy machine guns and 120 mm mortar fire. The ODAs managed to call in additional CAS, which covered the withdrawal of the fire support ODAs out of mortar range and finally suppressed the majority of Objective Stone's defenders, ODAs 394 and 395 quickly resupplied on ammunition and returned to the battle. However, the ODAs were not in place when ODA 043 convinced the Peshmerga to advance again, but the Peshmerga advanced and captured the hilltop objective.

To the South, ODAs 044, 391, and 392 ran into dirt berms that the Iraqis had built across the road leading to Objective Rock, scattering mines over the roadway. Whilst the Peshmerga attempted to clear the mines, the ODAs bypassed the roadblock. As the teams crested the ridge, they engaged Iraqi infantry in prepared positions and bunkers who soon surrendered under the firepower of the GMVs; an Iraqi Colonel who was taken prisoner said that an Iraqi Army armored unit that was supporting them had withdrawn south. The ODAs returned to breach the dirt berm on the road behind them with demolition charges in case a hasty retreat was required and moved up onto a small hill known as Press Hill, obscuring an approach to the crossroads from the south. The ODAs then advanced down to the Debecka crossroads themselves, at the edge of Debecka, ODA 392 pursued several Iraqi light mortar teams until it was engaged at long range by ZSU-57-2, whilst ODA 391 destroyed several trucks and technicals from Debecka with its Javelin anti-tank missiles and .50-caliber heavy machine guns.

Soon after, the ODAs spotted a number of Iraqi MT-LB tracked armored personnel carriers appear out of the haze—advancing cautiously toward the crossroads and using their smoke generators to lay down a smokescreen behind them. The Green Berets attempted to suppress and halt them with .50-caliber machine guns and MK19 grenade launchers. They needed to buy themselves time to call in airstrikes and to cool down the Command Launch Units of their Javelins. At that moment, four Iraqi T-55 tanks appeared from behind the MT-LBs, firing their 100 mm guns directly at the Green Berets. The ODAs mounted their GMVs and pulled back to a ridgeline some 900m from the crossroads which they dubbed their "Alamo"; the Green Berets continued to ask for air support only to be told it would take a further 30 minutes to arrive on-station. The ODAs Javelin units were finally ready and began destroying the MT-LBs; however, they were running low on missiles. The sudden onslaught of missiles temporarily halted the Iraqi attack. The T-55s used a dirt berm to approach the crossroads slowly, effectively shielding them from the "lock-on" of a Javelin; finally—some 35 minutes after the initial request was made—two U.S. Navy F-14 Tomcats arrived.

Despite being directed onto the T-55s, the first GBU-16 (1000LB) bomb landed among friendly forces, including a Green Beret AOB (Advanced Operational Base) at Objective Rock. The F-14 pilot got confused and targeted an old rusting hulk of a similar T-55 at Objective Rock rather than the four engaging the ODAs. The bomb killed 18 Peshmerga and wounded 45 along with 4 AOB Green Berets, and John Simpson's BBC camera crew accompanying the Peshmerga, killing his translator. Half of ODA 391 immediately drove to the scene and began treating casualties.

The rest of the Green Berets were forced to pull back from the "Alamo" to Press Hill as Iraqi artillery began to bracket them. One of the Green Berets managed to destroy one T-55 that broke cover and attempted to advance toward them. Finally, a pair of U.S. Navy F/A-18s arrived and drove off the remaining tanks with several bombs, ending the battle.

SSG Jason Brown (ODA 391) SGT Jeff Adamec (ODA 392) and SSG Eric Strigotte (ODA 044) all were awarded Silver Star Medals for their actions during the battle.
