= Texas Park Road 2 =

Highway in Texas

PR 2
- PR 2 highlighted in red

Route information
- Maintained by TxDOT
- Length: 1.110 mi (1.786 km)
- Existed: June 22, 1937–present

Major junctions
- South end: FM 2198 in Caddo Lake State Park
- North end: Numerous small in-park roads

Location
- Country: United States
- State: Texas
- Counties: Harrison

Highway system
- Highways in Texas; Interstate; US; State; Former; Toll; Loops; Spurs; FM/RM; Park; Rec
← FM 2	→ RE 2

Park Road 2 (PR 2) is a 1.110-mile-long (1.786 km) road that connects Caddo Lake State Park to Farm to Market Road 2198 (FM 2198). Park Road 2 is located in Harrison County, in the northeastern region of the U.S. state of Texas. The Civilian Conservation Corps constructed the road in the 1930s, and the road was designated in 1937 as one of the original park roads in the state highway system.

== Route description ==
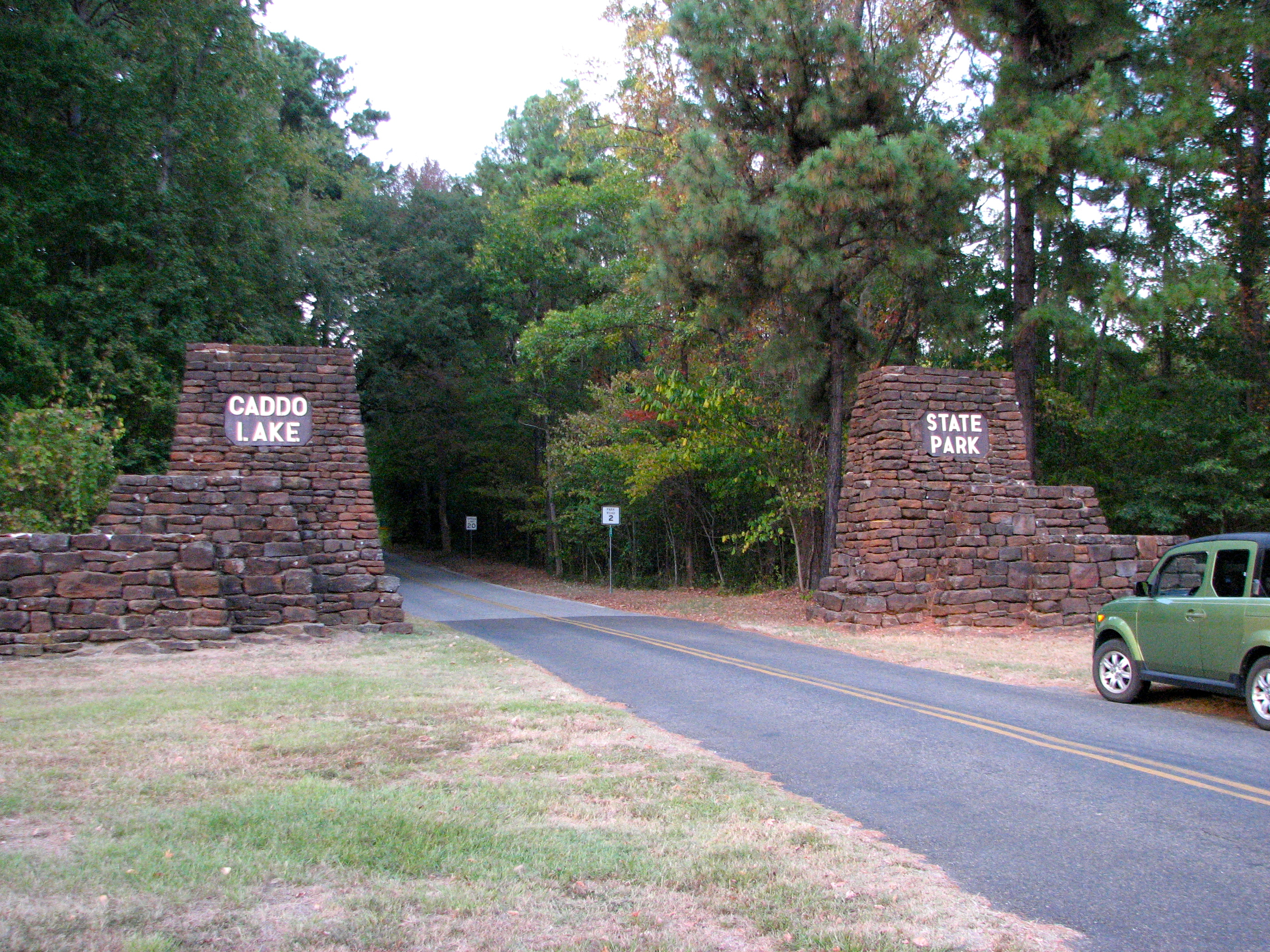
The entrance to Caddo Lake State Park, along PR 2

PR 2 begins at its southern terminus, an intersection with FM 2198, as an undivided, two-lane, paved road. The highway proceeds north into Caddo Lake State Park, passing around the park headquarters building, and continuing towards cabin sites. The road proceeds north, past the cabins, and splits into a large loop. The route passes Saw Mill Pond, and a small parking lot for the pond, before continuing down a steep slope back to the beginning of the loop. The PR 2 designation also includes three small roads that serve the main park campgrounds.

== History ==
In 1927, a small area of land near Caddo Lake was donated to create a public park. In 1929 and later in 1931 Caddo Lake itself and some of the surrounding areas were designated by the state of Texas to become state parkland. Between 1933 and 1937, the Civilian Conservation Corps (CCC) rebuilt the park and created many of the park's structures. The National Park Service designated landscape designers Joe W. Westbrook and Fred R. Carpentar, as well as others, to design the park's road system. On September 22, 1936, the state highway commission initiated an investigation at the request of the state's parks board into the incorporation of certain park roads as part of the state highway system after which the highway commission would assume maintenance of these roads. The highway commission accepted roads in eight state parks including 3.1 miles (5.0 km) of the park road in Caddo Lake State Park as the original park roads in the state system on June 22, 1937. On September 26, 1939, approximately 2.0 miles (3.2 km) of the roads inside the park were designated as PR 2. On August 15, 1968, a short road traveling from a boat-launch ramp to the park boundary was removed from PR 2, shortening the route by approximately 0.5 miles (0.80 km).

== Major intersections ==
The entire highway is in the Caddo Lake State Park, Harrison County.

mi	km	Destinations	Notes
0.000	0.000	FM 2198 – Jefferson, Uncertain	Southern terminus
1.110	1.786	Numerous in-park roads	Northern terminus
1.000 mi = 1.609 km; 1.000 km = 0.621 mi
