= Caddo Lake National Wildlife Refuge =

National Wildlife Refuge near Karnack, Texas

- IUCN category IV (habitat/species management area)
- Location within Texas Location within the United States
- Location: Harrison County, Texas, United States
- Nearest city: Karnack
- Coordinates: 32.6725°N 94.1281°W
- Area: 8,493 acres (3,437 ha)
- Established: 2000
- Governing body: U.S. Fish & Wildlife Service
- Website: Caddo Lake National Wildlife Refuge

The Caddo Lake National Wildlife Refuge is a 8,493-acre (3,437 ha) protected area of Texas managed by the United States Fish and Wildlife Service as part of the National Wildlife Refuge (NWR) system. It is located along Caddo Lake in East Texas.

The area that currently encompasses the refuge was highly valued in the 19th century because its loamy soil supported rich cotton plantations. During World War II, Longhorn Army Ammunition Plant was established on the site. In 1993, the importance of the wetlands surrounding Caddo Lake was recognized at the Ramsar Convention, as the area was one of 13 in the US that were deemed to be of "international significance". The NWR was authorized in 2000 to protect the bottomlands of the Harrison Bayou and to preserve the habitat for migratory birds.
