= Karnack Independent School District =

School district in Texas

Coordinates: 32.6676°N 94.1718°W

Karnack Independent School District is a public school district based in the community of Karnack, Texas (USA).

In addition to Karnack, the district also serves the city of Uncertain.

== Academic achievement ==
In 2009, the school district was rated "academically acceptable" by the Texas Education Agency.

== Schools ==
- Karnack Junior/Senior High (Grades 7-12) High school grades discontinued in 2015.
- George Washington Carver Elementary (Grades PK-6)

== See also ==
- List of school districts in Texas
- List of high schools in Texas
