= Uncertain, Texas =

- City
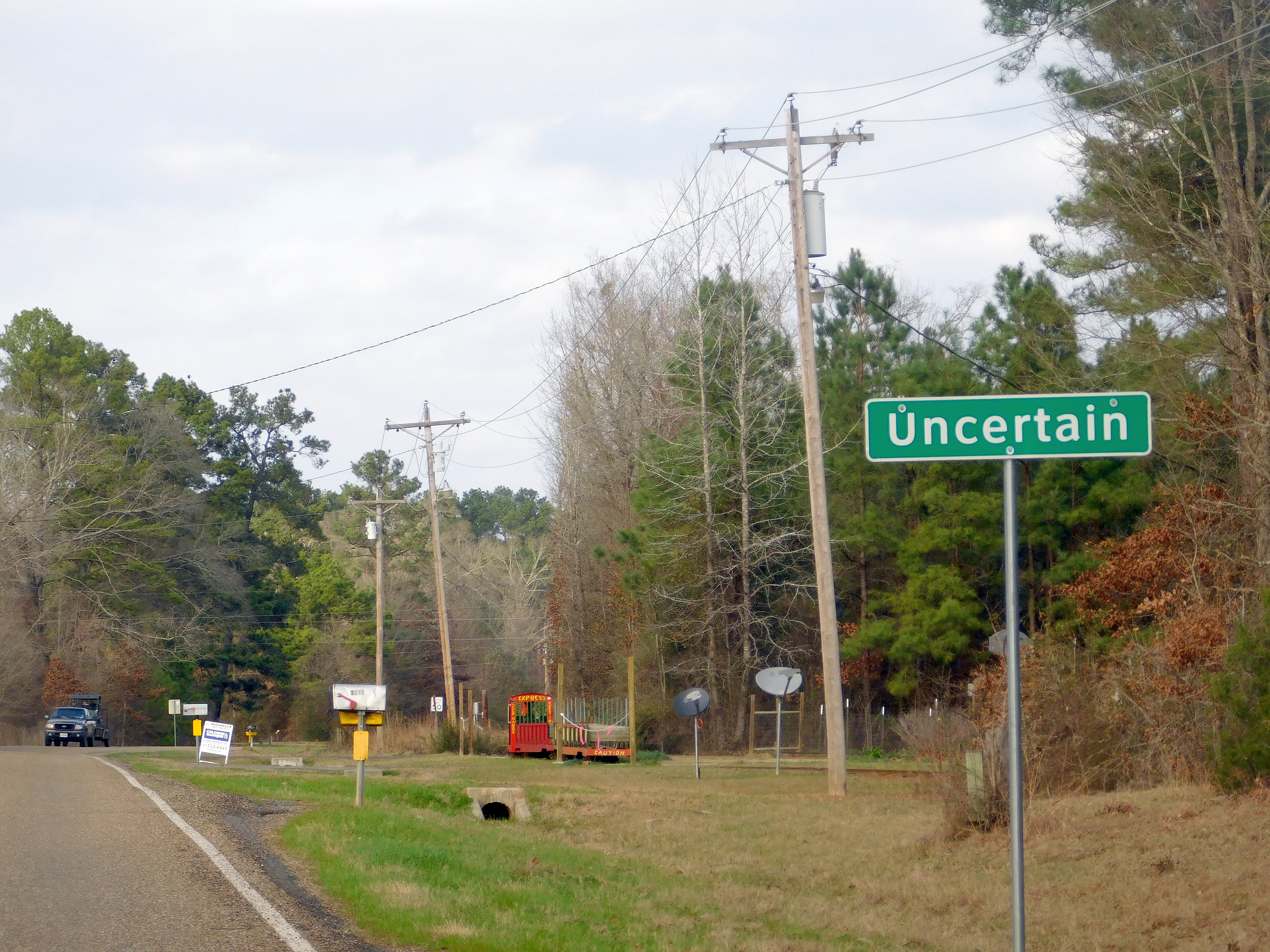
- City marker of Uncertain

- Location within Texas Location within the United States
- Coordinates: 32°42′22″N 94°07′46″W
- Country: United States
- State: Texas
- County: Harrison

Area
  - Total: 0.54 sq mi (1.39 km^{2})
  - Land: 0.54 sq mi (1.39 km^{2})
  - Water: 0 sq mi (0.00 km^{2})
- Elevation: 184 ft (56 m)

Population (2020)
  - Total: 85
  - Density: 171.4/sq mi (66.17/km^{2})
- Time zone: UTC-6 (Central (CST))
  - Summer (DST): UTC-5 (CDT)
- ZIP code: 75661
- Area codes: 903, 430
- FIPS code: 48-74240
- GNIS feature ID: 2412128
- Website: www.cityofuncertain.com

Uncertain is a city in Harrison County, Texas, United States. According to the 2010 census, the city population was 94, down from 150 at the 2000 census. In 2020, it had a population of 85.

== History ==
The city of Uncertain was incorporated in 1961 as a Type B general law city, with a mayor and five aldermen on an at-large basis.

Uncertain has been noted for its unusual place name. According to tradition, the town derives its name from the original application for township where the name for it had not been decided. Therefore when the original residents filled out the application they put "Uncertain" in the blank for the name. When the township was given, it then became "Uncertain".

== Geography ==
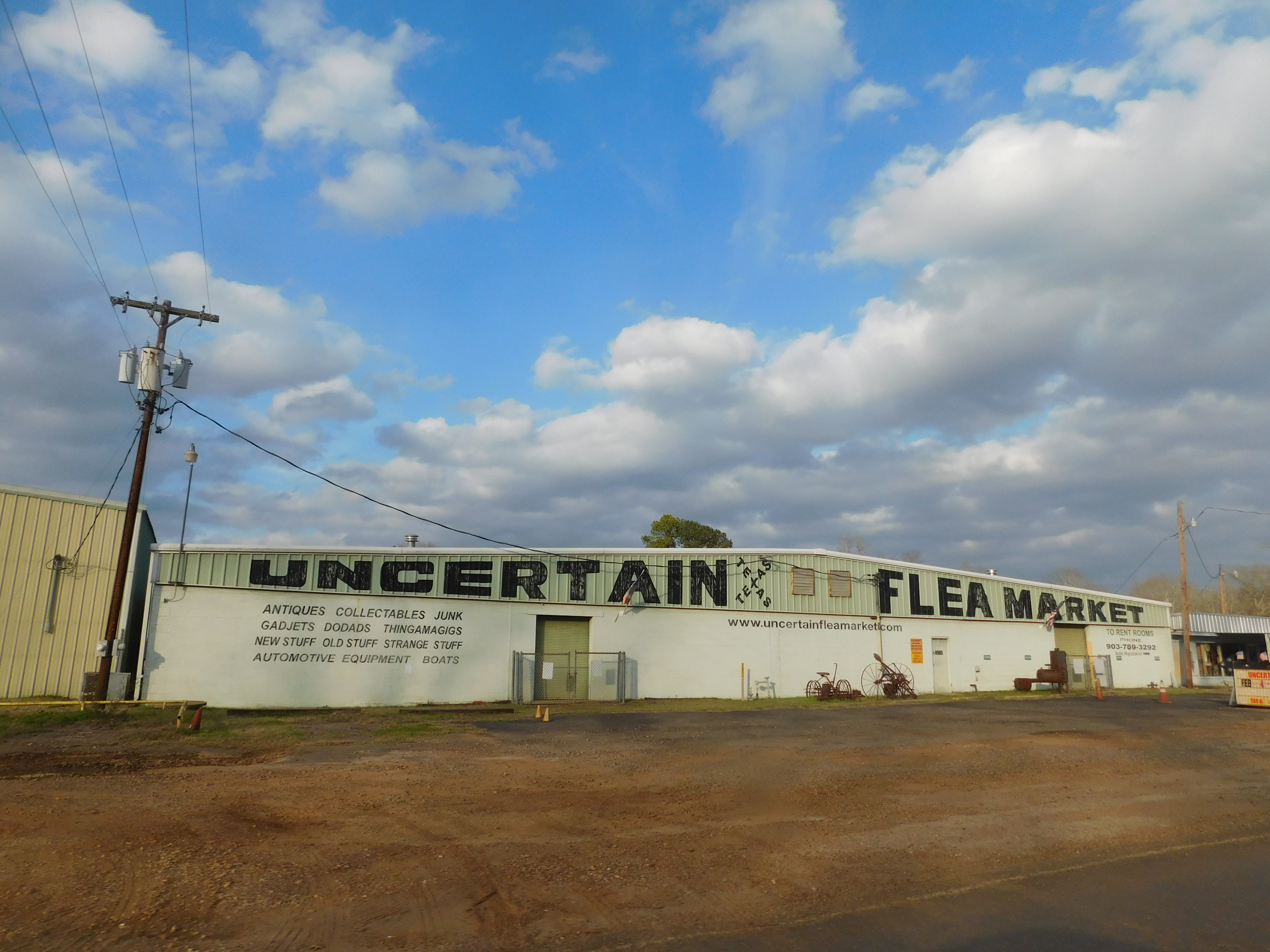
Uncertain Flea Market, 2017

Uncertain is in the northeastern corner of Harrison County, at the west end of Caddo Lake, a water body on Big Cypress Bayou that extends east into Louisiana. The city is at the east end of Farm to Market Road 2198, which leads southwest 5 miles (8 km) to State Highway 43 near Karnack. Uncertain is 21 miles (34 km) northeast of Marshall, the Harrison county seat.

According to the United States Census Bureau, the city has a total area of 0.50 square miles (1.3 km^{2}), of which 0.2 acres (996 m^{2}), or 0.08%, are water.

== Demographics ==
Historical population
Census	Pop.	Note	%±
1970	202		—
1980	176		−12.9%
1990	194		10.2%
2000	150		−22.7%
2010	94		−37.3%
2020	85		−9.6%
U.S. Decennial Census

=== 2020 census ===
As of the 2020 census, Uncertain had a population of 85. The median age was 60.2 years. 2.4% of residents were under the age of 18 and 37.6% of residents were 65 years of age or older. For every 100 females there were 112.5 males, and for every 100 females age 18 and over there were 112.8 males age 18 and over.

0.0% of residents lived in urban areas, while 100.0% lived in rural areas.

There were 55 households in Uncertain, of which 23.6% had children under the age of 18 living in them. Of all households, 43.6% were married-couple households, 25.5% were households with a male householder and no spouse or partner present, and 30.9% were households with a female householder and no spouse or partner present. About 36.4% of all households were made up of individuals and 18.2% had someone living alone who was 65 years of age or older.

There were 124 housing units, of which 55.6% were vacant. The homeowner vacancy rate was 6.1% and the rental vacancy rate was 9.1%.

Racial composition as of the 2020 census
Race	Number	Percent
White	68	80.0%
Black or African American	14	16.5%
American Indian and Alaska Native	1	1.2%
Asian	0	0.0%
Native Hawaiian and Other Pacific Islander	0	0.0%
Some other race	1	1.2%
Two or more races	1	1.2%
Hispanic or Latino (of any race)	2	2.4%

=== 2000 census ===
At the 2000 census, there were 150 people, 77 households, and 49 families residing in the city. The population density was 294.1 inhabitants per square mile (113.6/km^{2}). There were 137 housing units at an average density of 268.7 per square mile (103.7/km^{2}). The racial makeup of the city was 72.67% White, 26.67% African American and 0.67% (i.e. 1 person) Native American.

== Education ==
The city of Uncertain is served by the Karnack Independent School District.

Panola College is the assigned community college for the majority of Harrison County, Uncertain included, according to the Texas Education Code.
