= List of highways numbered 2N =

The following highways are numbered 2N:

== United States ==
- U.S. Route 2N (former)
- New Jersey Route 2N (former)

== See also ==
- List of highways numbered 2
