= List of A2 roads =

This is a list of roads designated A2. Roads entries are sorted alphabetically by country.

- A2 motorway (Albania), a road connecting Vlore with Fier
- A2 motorway (Algeria), a road connecting Algiers with the Algeria-Tunisia border
- A002 road (Argentina), a road connecting Avenida General Paz and Ministro Pistarini International Airport
- A2 road (Australia) may refer to:
  - A route consisting of parts of Windsor Road and Old Windsor Road in Sydney
  - The shield allocations of either the Barkly Highway, Landsborough Highway, or Warrego Highway, Queensland
  - The Bass Highway, a highway connecting the Midland Highway, Launceston and the Arthur River Road
- A2 motorway (Austria), a road connecting Vienna and the A23 to Arnoldstein and the Italian Autostrada A23
- A2 motorway (Belgium), a road connecting Leuven and the Dutch border near Sittard
- A2 highway (Botswana), a road connecting Francistown and Kasane
- A2 motorway (Bulgaria), a road under construction connecting Sofia and Varna
- A2 motorway (Croatia), a road connecting Zagreb and Slovenia
- A2 motorway (Cuba), a ring road serving Havana
- A2 motorway (Cyprus), a road connecting Nicosia and Larnaca
- A2 motorway (France), a road connecting Combles and the border with Belgium
- A2 motorway (Germany), a road connecting the Ruhr Area and Berlin
- A2 motorway (Greece), the longest motorway in Greece
- A2 motorway (Italy), a road connecting Fisciano with Villa San Giovanni
- A2 motorway (Italy): Former name of the highway connecting Rome and Naples. Since 1988, after the construction of a connection to the A1 (Milan-Rome) bypassing Rome's ring road, the code A1 refers to the whole motorway between Milan and Naples.
- A2 road (Jamaica), a road connecting Spanish Town and Savanna-la-Mar
- A2 road (Jersey), a dual carriage way in Jersey, Channel Islands
- A2 highway (Kazakhstan), a road in Kazakhstan
- A2 road (Kenya), a road connecting Nairobi and Moyale
- A2 road (Latvia), a road connecting Riga and the Estonian border
- A2 highway (Lithuania), a road connecting Vilnius and Panevėžys
- A2 road (Malaysia) may refer to:
  - A2 road (Perak), a road connecting Taiping and Kamunting
  - A2 road (Sabah), a road connecting Lawas, Sarawak and Kota Kinabalu
- A2 motorway (Morocco), a road connecting Rabat and Fez
- A2 motorway (Netherlands), a road connecting Amsterdam and the Belgian border near Maastricht
- A2 highway (Nigeria), a road connecting Port Harcourt and Kano to the Niger Republic
- A2 road (China) may refer to:
  - A2 expressway (Shanghai), the former name of the S2 expressway in Shanghai
- A2 autostrada (Poland), a road connecting the border with Germany and the border with Belarus, running through Warsaw
- A2 motorway (Portugal), a road connecting Lisbon and the Algarve
- A2 motorway (Romania), a road connecting Bucharest and Constanţa
- A2 motorway (Serbia), a road connecting Belgrade and Čačak
- A2 motorway (Slovenia), a road connecting the Austrian border and Obrežje at the Croatian border
- A2 road (Spain) may refer to:
  - A-2 motorway (Spain), a road connecting Madrid and Barcelona
  - A2 motorway (Extremadura), a road connecting Miajadas and Don Benito-Villanueva de la Serena
- A 2 road (Sri Lanka), a road connecting Colombo and Wellawaya
- A2 motorway (Switzerland), a road connecting Basel and Chiasso
- A2 highway (Thailand), AH2 road of the Asian Highway Network
- A2 road (United Kingdom) may refer to:
  - A2 road (England), a road connecting London and Dover
  - A2 road (Isle of Man), a road connecting Douglas and Ramsey
  - A2 road (Northern Ireland), a road connecting Newry, County Down and Muff, County Donegal
- A2 road (United States) may refer to:
  - Interstate A-2, a road in Alaska
  - County Route A2 (California), a road connecting California State Route 299 and California State Route 139
  - A-2 (Michigan county highway), a road running along the shoreline of Lake Michigan in the Lower Peninsula of Michigan
- A2 road (Zimbabwe), a road connecting Harare and Kaombe, Mozambique

== See also ==
- List of highways numbered 2
