= National Highway 2 (Djibouti) =

Road in Djibouti

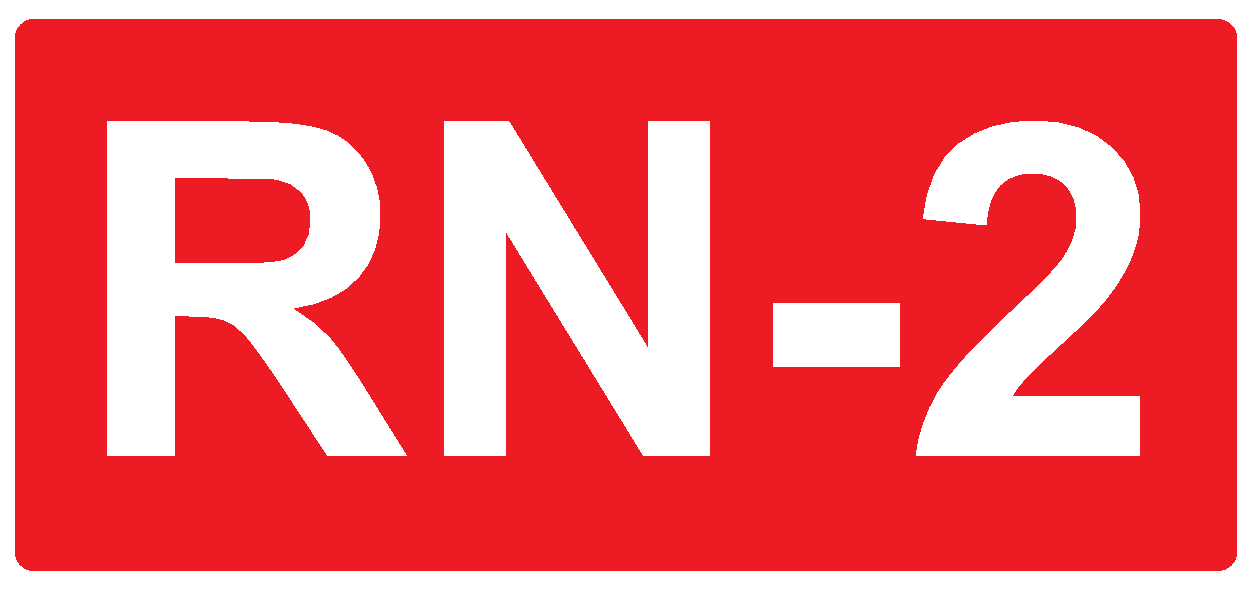
National Highway 2
- Arabic: الطريق السريع الوطنى 2 French: Route Nationale 2
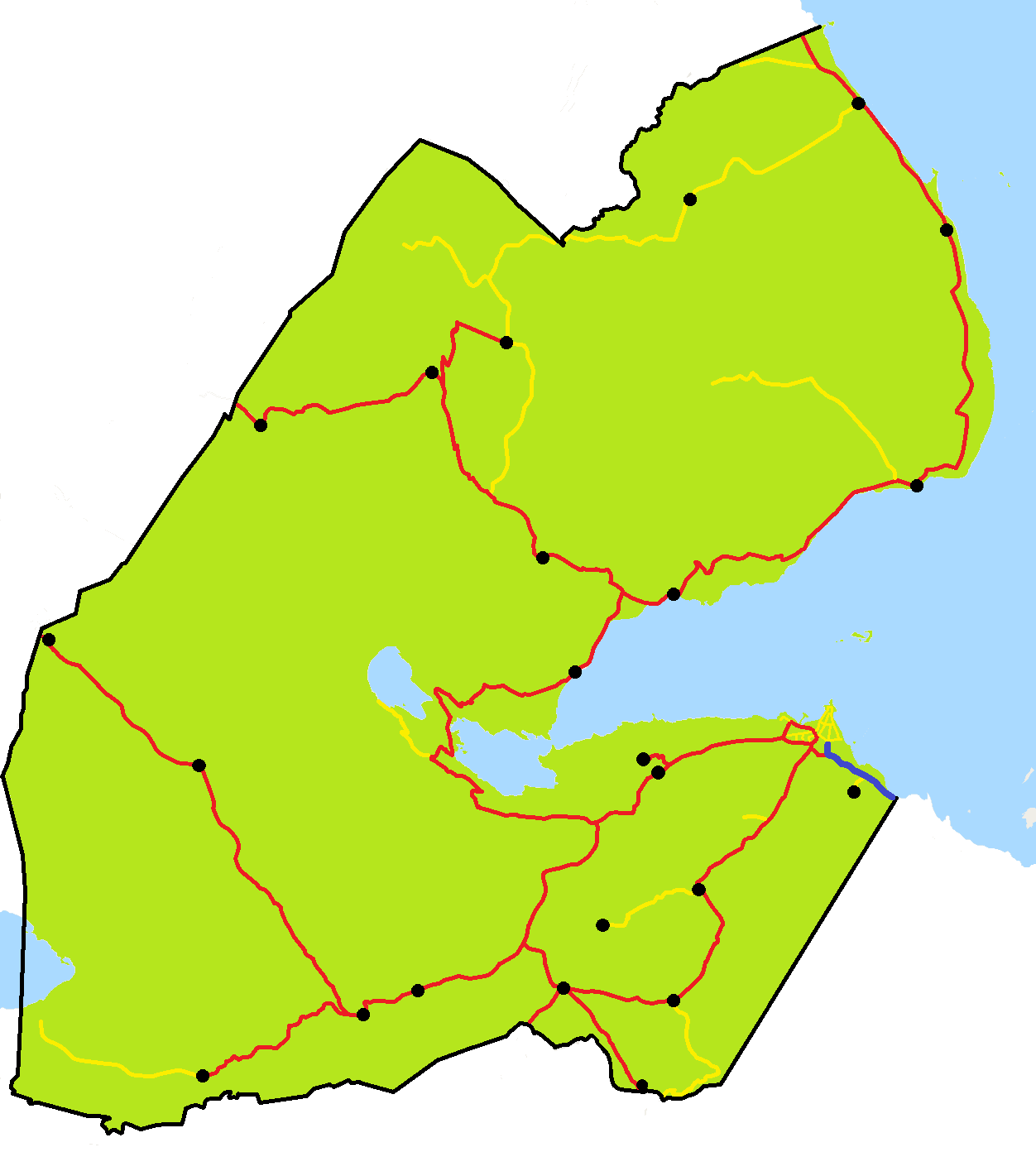

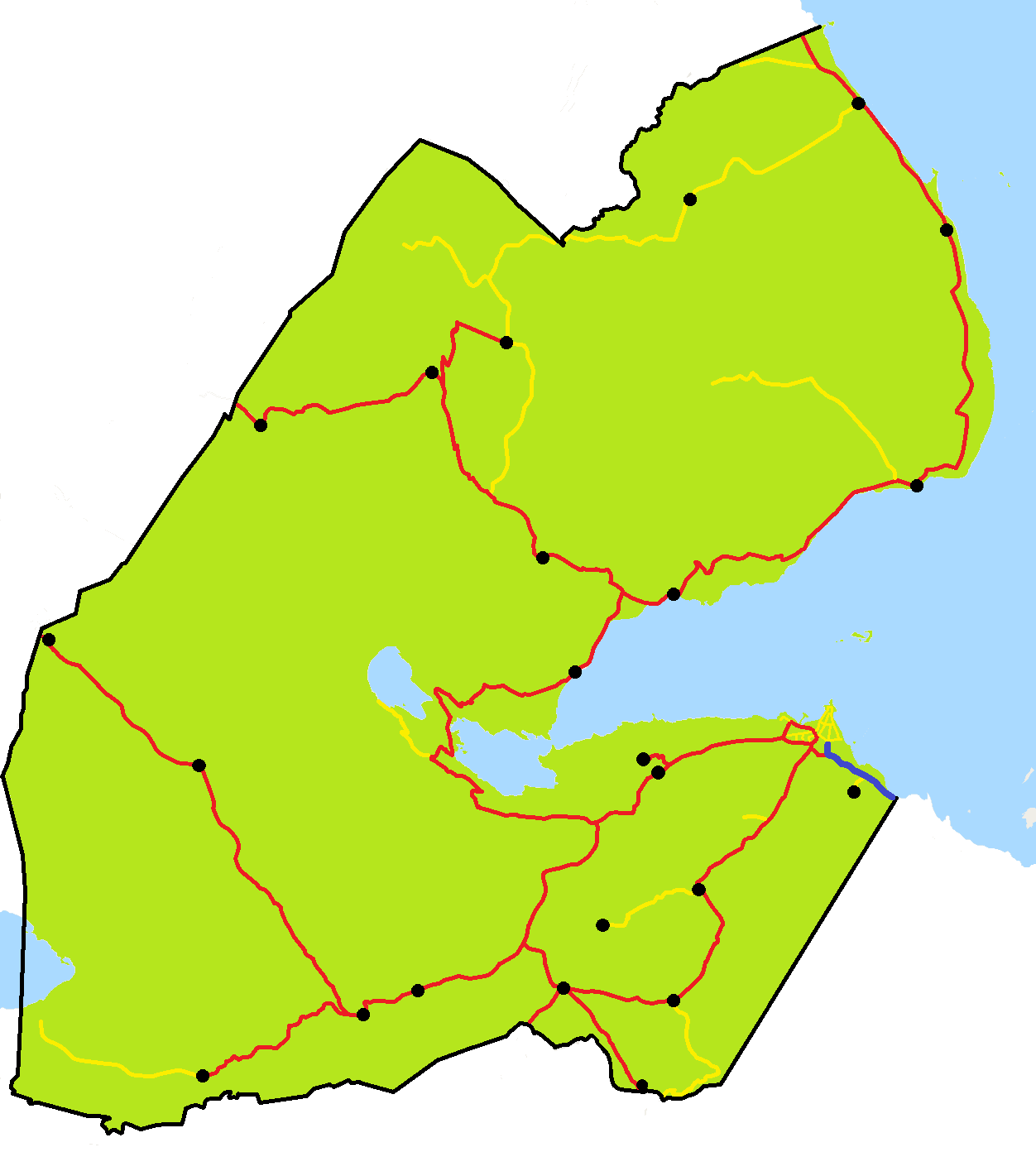

Route information
- Length: 19 km (12 mi)
- Existed: 1973–present

Major junctions
- From: Djibouti City
- To: Loyada

Location
- Country: Djibouti

Highway system
- Transport in Djibouti

The RN-2 National Highway is a national highway in Djibouti. It has a length of 19 kilometres (12 mi) across the regions of Djibouti and Arta, it links Loyada along the coast with a border crossing to Somalia.
