= Caddo Lake =

Lake bordering Texas and Louisiana

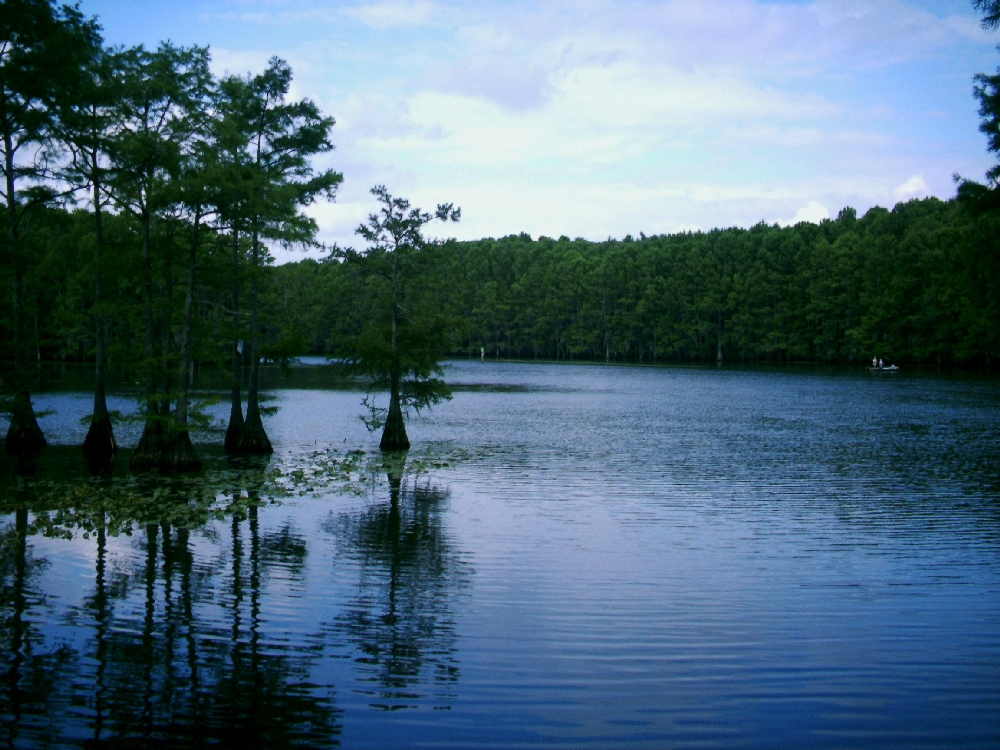
- Viewed from a point near Uncertain

- Caddo Lake Caddo Lake (Texas) Caddo Lake (the United States)
- Location: Texas, Louisiana
- Coordinates: 32°43′N 94°01′W
- Basin countries: United States
- Surface area: 25,400 acres (10,300 ha)
- Surface elevation: 161 ft (49 m)
- Islands: Tar Island

Ramsar Wetland
- Designated: 23 October 1993
- Reference no.: 633

Caddo Lake (French: Lac Caddo) is a 25,400-acre (10,300 ha) lake and bayou (wetland) on the border between Texas and Louisiana, in northern Harrison County and southern Marion County in Texas and western Caddo Parish in Louisiana. The lake is named after the Caddoans or Caddo, Native Americans who lived in the area until their expulsion by the United States in the 19th century. The US forced most of them to move west to Indian Territory.

The lake and bayou comprise an internationally protected wetland under the Ramsar Convention and includes one of the largest flooded cypress forests in the United States. Caddo is one of Texas's few non-oxbow natural lakes. It was artificially altered by the addition of a dam in the 1900s.

== Formation ==
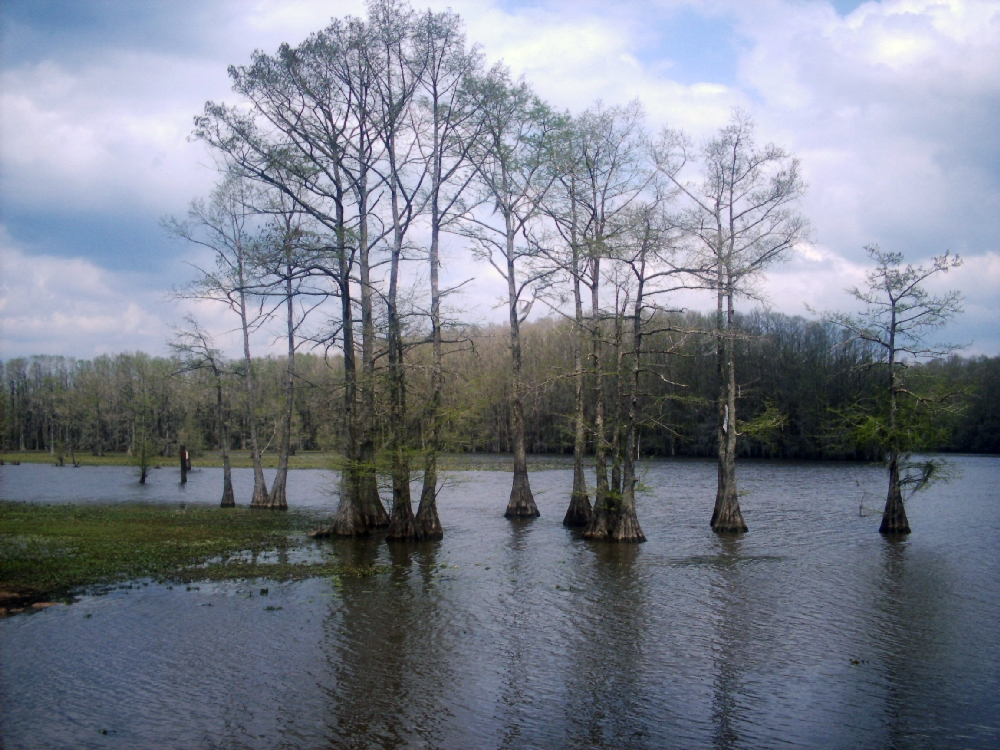
Caddo Lake during winter

According to Caddo legend, the lake was formed by the 1811–12 New Madrid earthquakes. There may be some truth to the legend, as Reelfoot Lake in Tennessee has been documented as formed by that earthquake.

But most geologists believe that the lake was formed earlier, either gradually or catastrophically, by the "Great Raft", a 165-mile (266-kilometer) log jam on the Red River in Louisiana. This likely caused flooding of the existing low-lying basin. According to a 1913–1914 survey that dated timber there, the lake formed about 1770 to 1780.

== History ==
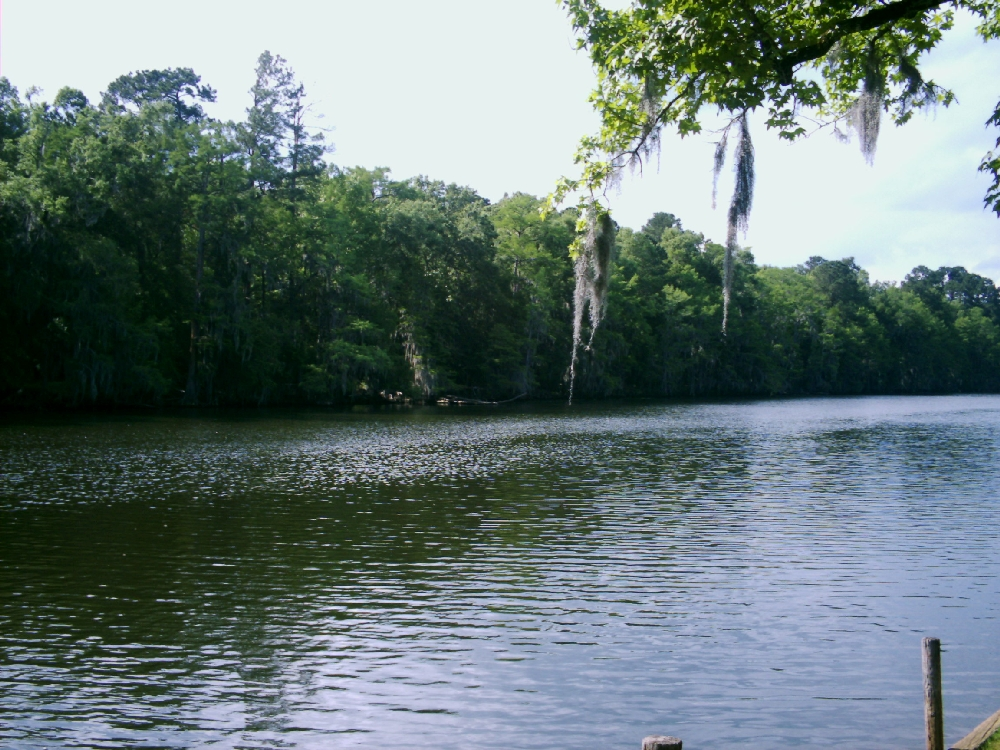
The Channel was used by steamboats to reach the port at Jefferson, until water levels fell after the removal of the Great Raft.

Caddo Lake has been used by Native Americans for hundreds of years, but substantial commercial development would only begin with invention of the steamboat and US annexation of Louisiana and Texas by treaty in the 19th century. The cities of Port Caddo, Swanson's Landing, and Jefferson in Texas, and Mooringsport in Louisiana, had thriving riverboat ports on the lake. Jefferson was the largest inland port in the United States during this period.

Gradually as the log jams were removed in the lake and on the Red River by Captain Henry Miller Shreve and then by the Army Corps of Engineers, the lake changed shape and eventually its water level dropped by more than 10 feet (3.0 m). This dramatically reduced navigability by riverboat and ended the success of the East Texas ports.

A different industry came to Caddo Lake in the early 20th century with the discovery of oil beneath it. The world's first over-water oil platform was completed in Caddo Lake in 1911. The Ferry Lake No. 1 was erected by Gulf Refining Company. The well bottomed at 2,185 feet (666 m) and produced 450 barrels per day (72 m^{3}/d).

Oil derricks were erected throughout the lake, further damaging the fragile ecosystem. The oil industry left Caddo for richer fields at Kilgore and other locations in Texas. Texas tried to preserve parts of Caddo in 1934 by establishing a 483-acre (2 km^{2}) state park, with trails, cabins, and other facilities constructed by the WPA.

The Longhorn Army Ammunition Plant was built on the shores of Caddo in the mid-20th century, and its operations polluted large portions of the surrounding wetlands until its closure in the 1990s. Most of the former plant site is now a federal wildlife refuge.

In 1913 and 1914, ecologist Lionel Janes conducted a federal survey of Caddo Lake (called Ferry Lake at the time) for the Department of Interior. Based on an examination of cross sections of bald cypress and hardwood trees, and many dead stumps, he estimated that the lake formed sometime between 1770 and 1780.

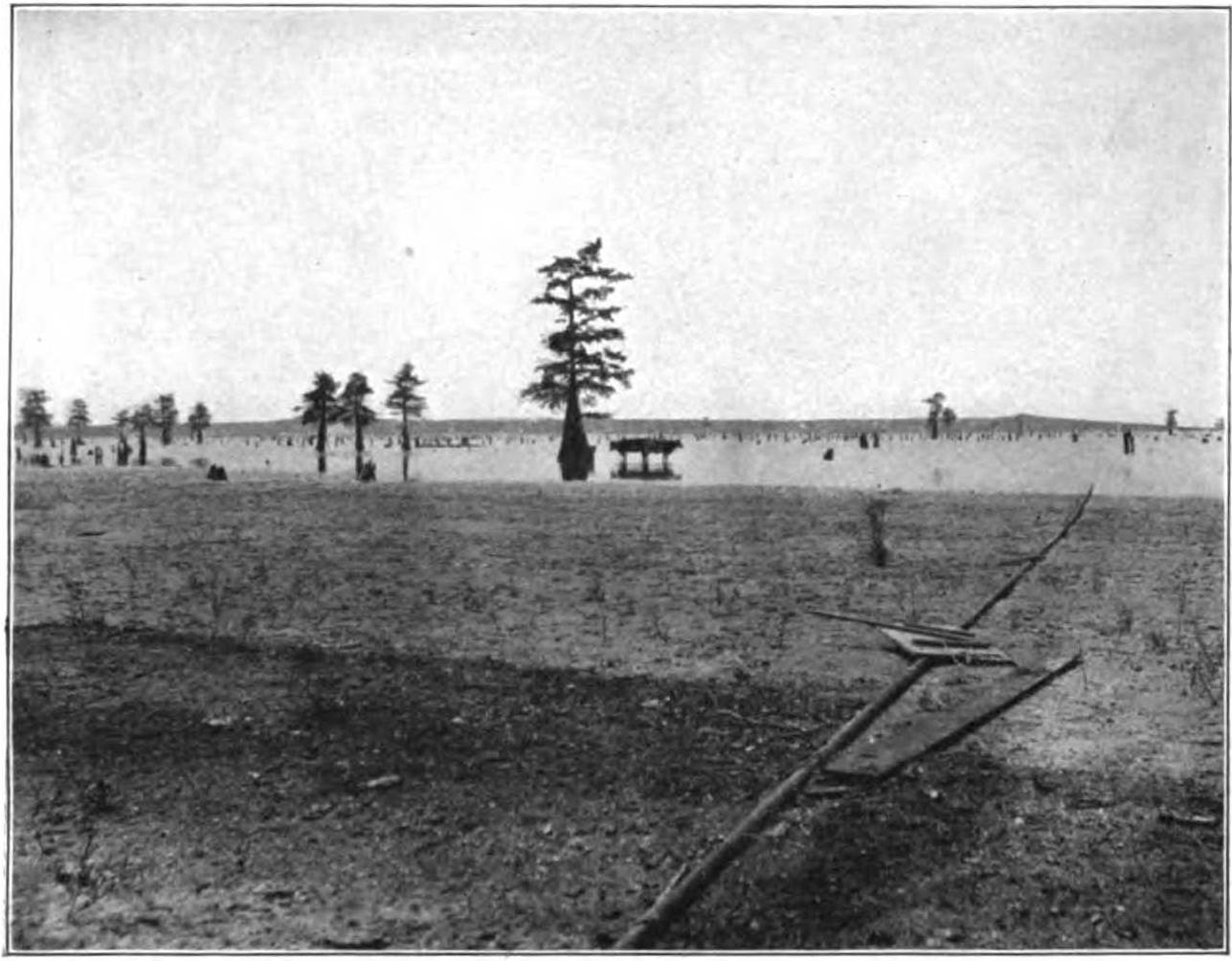
Caddo Lake c. 1910

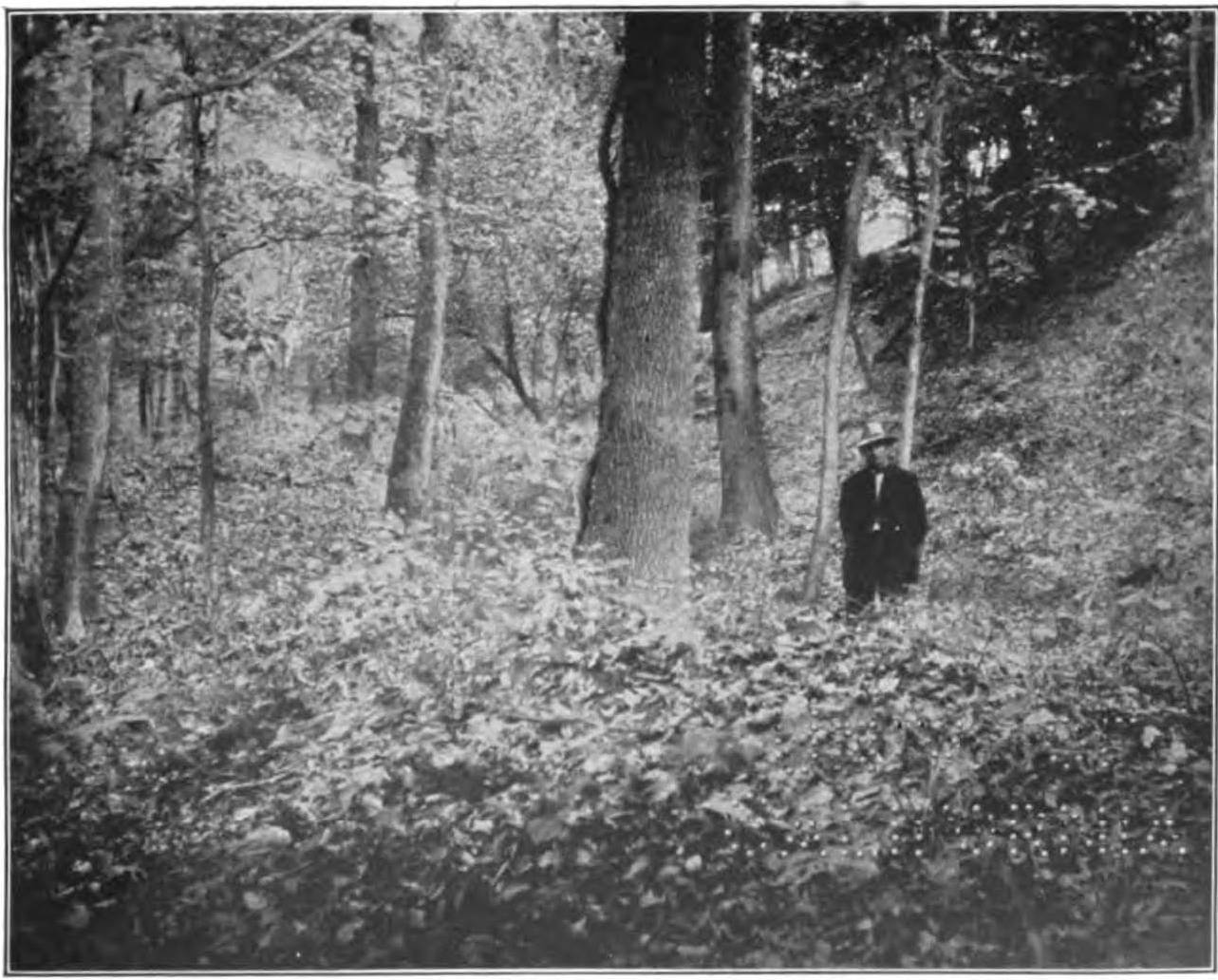
Landslide terrace, north bank of Caddo Lake, c. 1910

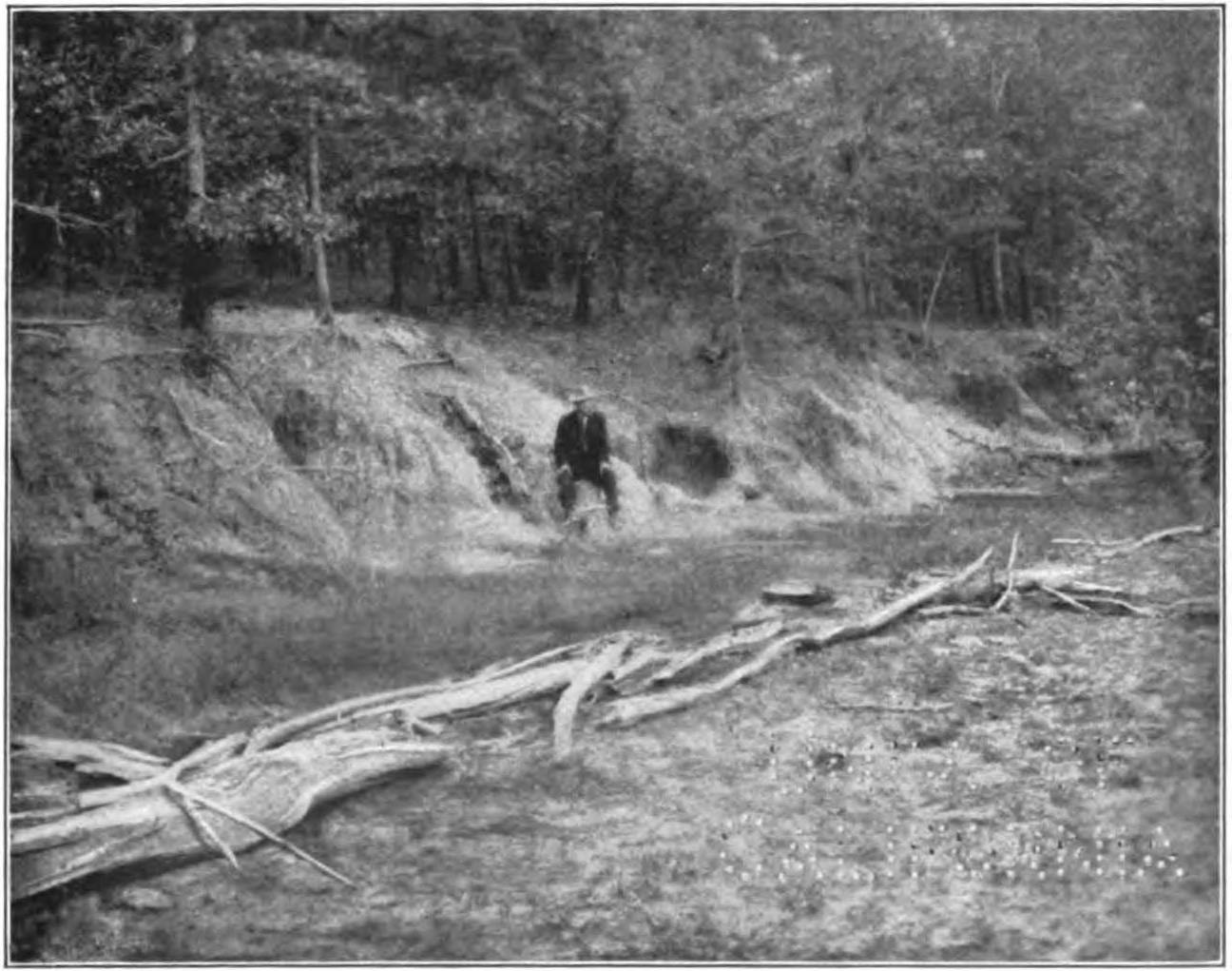
Potters Point, north shore of Caddo Lake, c. 1910

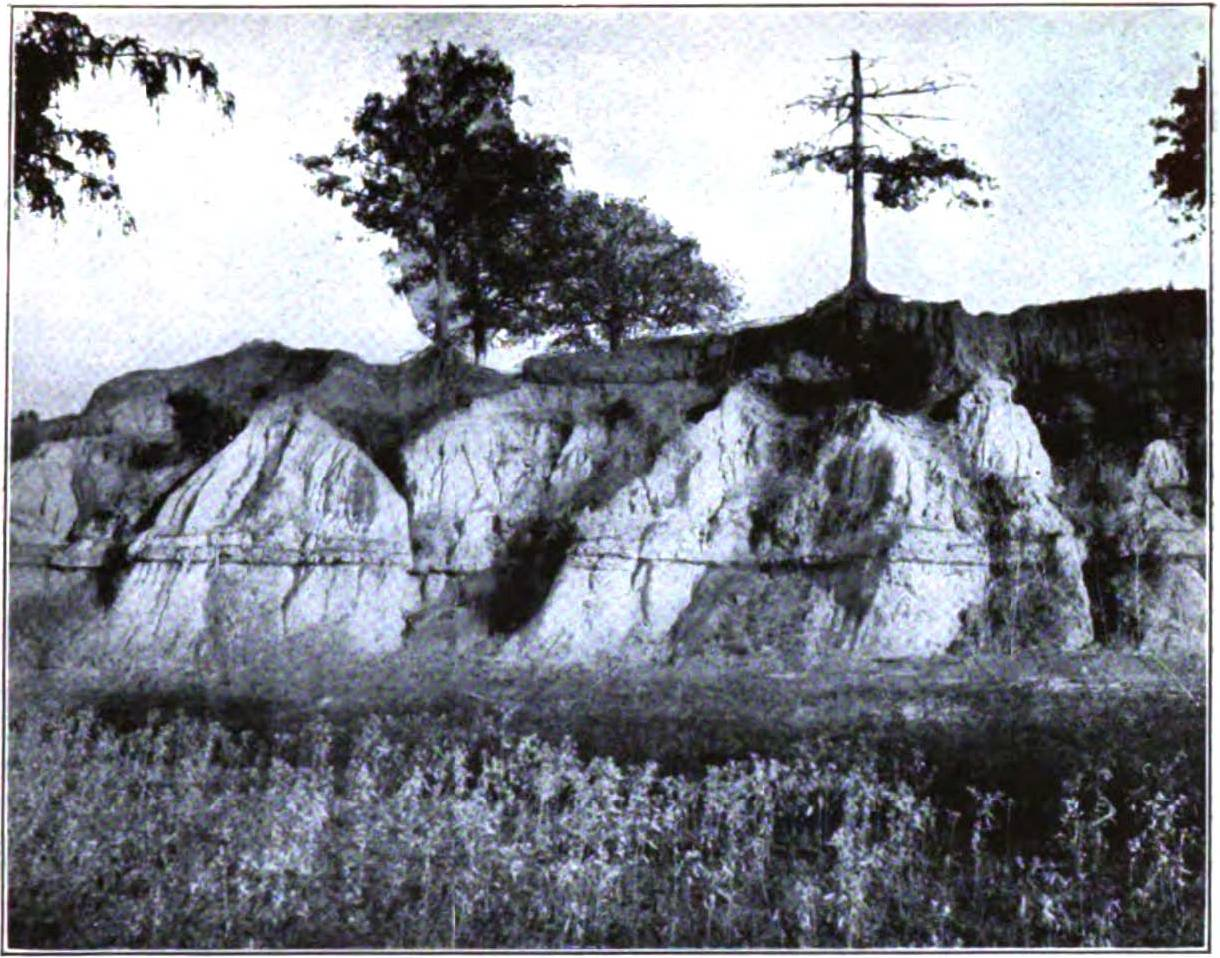
South bank of Caddo Lake, c. 1910

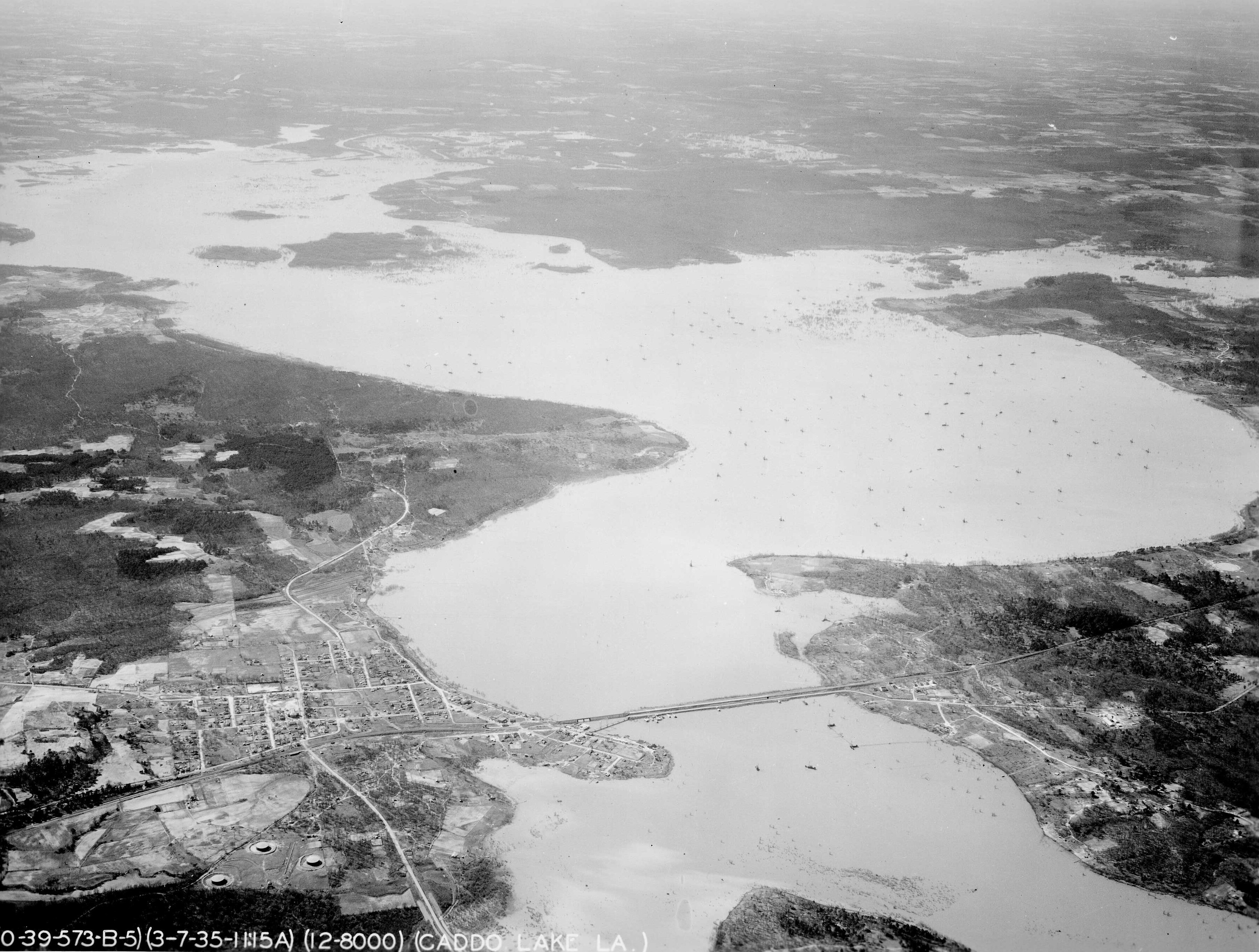
Caddo Lake Aerial view in 1935, Mooringsport, LA in the foreground

== Wildlife ==
Wildlife inhabiting Caddo Lake includes owls, snakes, frogs, waterfowl, bobcats, river otters, beavers, eagles, and alligators.

== Preservation efforts ==
In 1993 Caddo Lake preservation efforts were expanded. The Nature Conservancy had purchased 7,000 acres (2,833 ha) of the Caddo Lake area and announced an agreement to merge this property with the 483-acre (195 ha) Texas Caddo State Park, creating the Caddo Lake State Park and Wildlife Management Area. As a result of efforts by the Caddo Lake Institute (co-founded by Don Henley and Dwight K. Shellman), in October 1993 Caddo Lake became one of thirteen areas in the United States protected by the Ramsar Convention. This is an international effort to protect important wetlands for sustainability. Among supporters advocating preservation of Caddo Lake has been rocker Don Henley, singer and songwriter for The Eagles. The Ramsar site was expanded in 1998 to include a total of approximately 20,000 acres (81 km^{2}).

As of 2003, Caddo Lake flora and fauna consisted of 189 species of trees and shrubs, 75 grasses, 42 woody vines, 216 kinds of birds, 90 fish and reptiles, and 47 mammals. The Crataegus opaca, known as the mayhaw, produces fruit that people use to make jelly. Forty-four of Caddo's native species were either endangered, threatened or rare.

From 2001 until 2003 Caddo Lake residents fought a legal battle with the City of Marshall, Texas over water rights.

== Current threat ==
The lake is "under siege" by a fast-spreading, Velcro-like aquatic fern, Salvinia molesta, also known as giant salvinia. Accidentally introduced to the lake by boaters, the noxious weed doubles in size every two to four days, rapidly killing off life below the surface. Most of the growth of the plant is on the Louisiana side. Officials have been focused on recovering from damage caused by Hurricanes Katrina and Rita in 2005.

Efforts at removing the weed have included biological means via beetles that normally eat the weed, but these were unable to survive the Texas cold. Herbicide is also being used against the invasive fern. The Texas Water Resource Institute's Caddo Lake Salvinia Eradication Project is evaluating multiple methods of eradication.

== Texas Bigfoot ==
Since 1965 Texas's Caddo Lake has been the center of hundreds of alleged Bigfoot sightings, according to the North American Wood Ape Conservancy (NAWAC). This was reported in the Travel Channel 2006 documentary Bigfoot.

== Cities and towns on Caddo Lake ==
- Karnack, Texas
- Mooringsport, Louisiana
- Oil City, Louisiana
- Uncertain, Texas
- Gray, Texas

== See also ==
- Caddo Lake State Park
- List of lakes in Louisiana
- List of lakes in Texas
- Caddo Lake (2024 film)
