= Highway 2 (Iraq) =

Road in Iraq

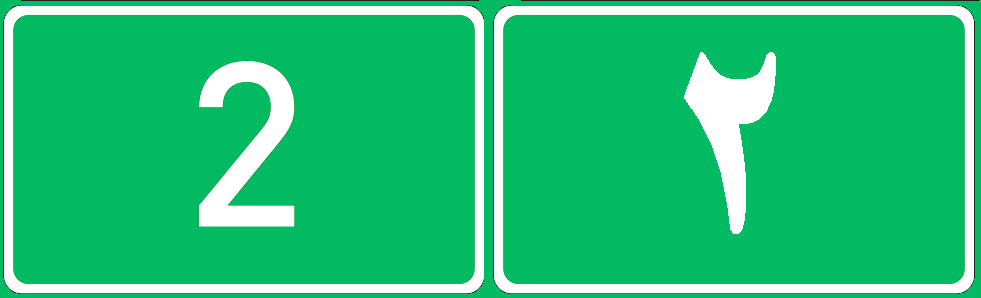
Highway 2
- ٢ طريق رقم

Route information
- Part of

Major junctions
- From: Baghdad
- To: Zakho D.430 E90 D430 Road

Location
- Country: Iraq

Highway system
- Highways in Iraq

Highway 2 is an Iraqi highway which extends from Baghdad to Silopi in Turkey. It passes through Baqubah, Al Khalis, Kirkuk, Erbil, Mosul, Dohuk and Zakho.

== Khazir Bridge ==
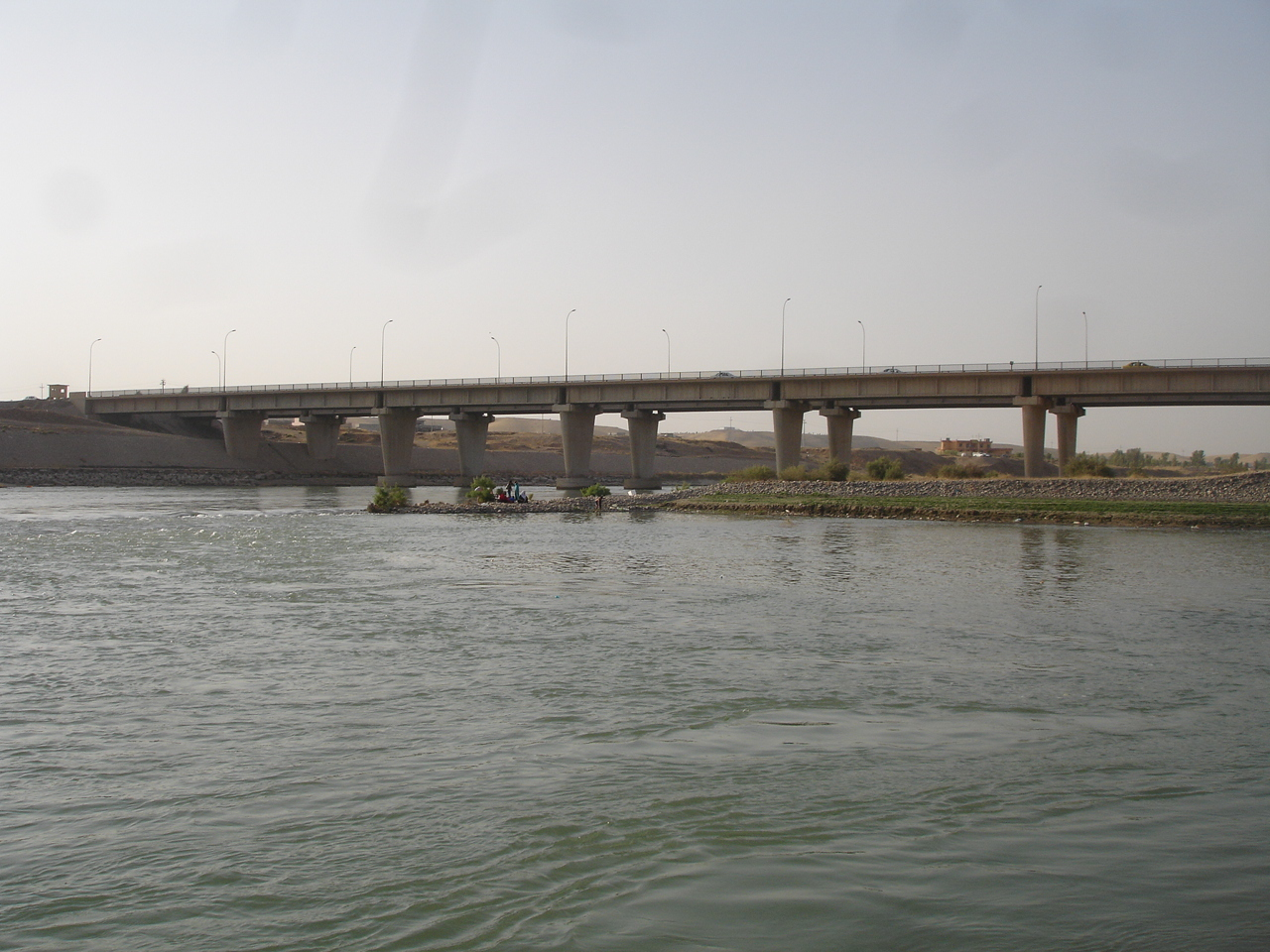
A bridge over the Khazir River on the road between Mosul and Erbil

Highway 2 crosses the Khazir River in-between Mosul and Erbil. The 2003 construction of the bridge was done as part of USAID developments with the Ministry of Public Works. This bridge was a twinned concrete structure with each direction bearing 2 lanes of traffic. It was partially destroyed a decade later by Islamic State militants with TNT.
