= Karnack, Texas =

Unincorporated community in Texas, US

Coordinates: 32°40′05″N 94°10′14″W

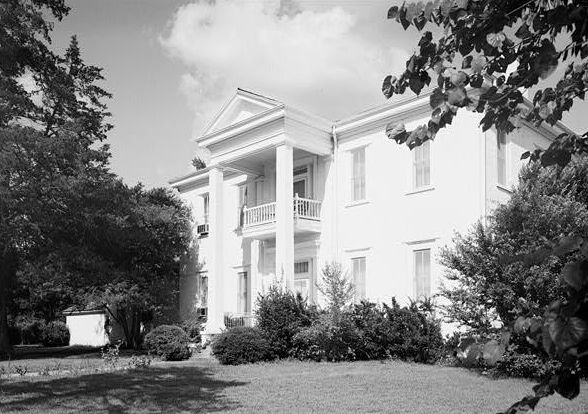
Andrews-Taylor House in Karnack, the childhood home of Lady Bird Johnson

Karnack is a rural unincorporated community in northeastern Harrison County near Caddo Lake in the eastern region of the U.S. state of Texas.

The town is named after Karnak, Egypt (near modern-day Luxor). The community's alignment with the city of Port Caddo was thought to be relative to that of Karnak and Thebes.

The Caddo Lake National Wildlife Refuge founded in 2000, formerly the Longhorn Army Ammunition Plant in operation there from 1942 to 1997, is located in Karnack.

== Geography ==
Karnack is located in the pine woods of Northeast Texas and beside Caddo Lake, one of the largest natural lakes in the Southeast. The surrounding country is mostly farm and timber land. According to The Handbook of Texas, Caddo Lake was one of the largest natural lakes in Texas before the construction of Caddo Dam in 1900 made the lake even larger. It is often called Texas' only natural lake, but many small natural lakes and oxbow lakes are found in Texas.

The climate in this area is characterized by hot, humid summers and generally mild to cool winters. According to the Köppen climate classification, Karnack has a humid subtropical climate, Cfaon climate maps.

== Education ==
Karnack is served by the Karnack Independent School District. Karnack Elementary School and Karnack Junior High School serve the community.

Panola College is the assigned community college for the majority of Harrison County, Karnack included, according to the Texas Education Code.

== Notable person ==
- Lady Bird Johnson, former First Lady of the United States, was born and raised in Karnack.
