= Dowling =

Dowling may refer to:

== Places ==
=== Australia ===
- Dowling County, land administrative division in New South Wales

=== Canada ===
- Dowling, Ontario, a community

=== Ireland ===
- Dowling, Kilkenny

=== United States ===
- Dowling, Michigan, census-designated place
- Dowling, Ohio, unincorporated community
- Dowling, South Dakota, a ghost town
- Dowling, Texas, unincorporated community
- Dowling Park, Florida, unincorporated community
- Dowling Township, Knox County, Nebraska

== Schools in the United States ==
- Dowling College, New York
- Dowling Catholic High School, Iowa

== Other ==
- Dowling (surname)
- 3529 Dowling, an asteroid

== See also ==
- Dowling v. United States (disambiguation)
- Doweling
