= Taylor Bayou =

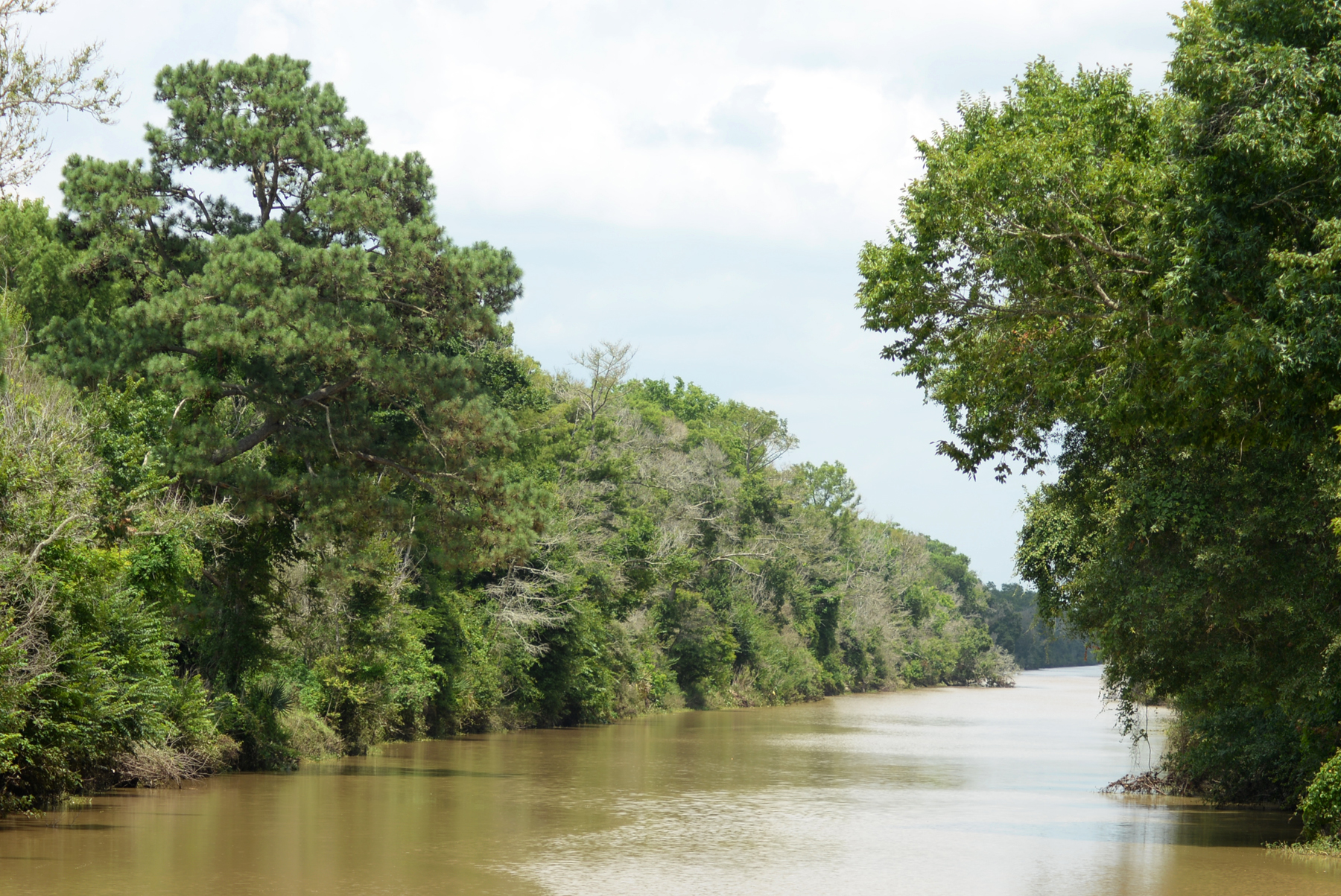
- North Fork of Taylor Bayou

Location
- Country: United States

Physical characteristics
- Source
  - coordinates: 29°51′18″N 94°11′18″W
  - elevation: 0 m (0 ft)
- Mouth
  - coordinates: 29°49′33″N 93°57′40″W
- Length: 18 mi (29 km)

Taylor Bayou is a bayou in Jefferson County, Texas. It is formed by the confluence of the North Fork and the South Fork. Mayhaw Bayou flows into the South Fork. The headwaters of these streams are in western Jefferson County. La Belle and Taylor Landing are small settlements near Taylor Bayou.

The bayou flows east. Near Port Arthur, it is joined by the left tributaries Hillebrandt Bayou and Alligator Bayou. There, is directed by canals into the Intracoastal Waterway, southwest of the Port of Port Arthur on Sabine Lake.

== See also ==
- List of rivers of Texas
