= La Belle, Texas =

Unincorporated community in Texas, US

Coordinates: 29°52′47″N 94°9′40″W

La Belle, also known as LaBelle, is an unincorporated community on Taylor Bayou and FM 365, approximately twelve miles south of Beaumont, in central Jefferson County, Texas, United States. It is part of the Beaumont–Port Arthur Metropolitan Statistical Area.

== History ==
Although officially recognized settlers had lived in the Taylor Bayou area since the 1830s, a post office was not established at the community known as Lower Taylor's Bayou until 1888. In that year new postmaster J. E. Broussard named the post office La Belle in honor of his fiancée, Mary Bell Bordages. The area's first school was probably started by Leo (Peg Leg) Craigen, near what later became the Port Arthur Country Club.

Located in the fertile but flood-prone prairies of the upper Texas Gulf Coast, La Belle was the site of one of several pumping stations designed to control flooding and drainage along Taylor Bayou.

Because of its somewhat isolated location, the LaBelle post office was discontinued in 1914. Local schools were consolidated with those of the town of Fannett in 1923. Fourteen years later, however, the discovery of large quantities of oil and natural gas at the La Belle oilfield, five miles south of the community, sparked new interest in the area. Scattered residences, the pumping station, and oilfields and gas lines to the south marked the La Belle community on maps during the mid-1970s.

In 1961, the Fannett Independent School District was combined with that of neighboring Hamshire, forming the Hamshire-Fannett Independent School District which currently serves area students.
