= Brinkley Bass =

Brinkley Bass may refer to:

- Harry Brinkley Bass (1916–1944), U.S. Navy pilot in World War II
- USS Brinkley Bass (DD-887), U.S. Navy destroyer named for Harry Brinkley Bass, commissioned 1945 and decommissioned 1973
