= Sabine–Neches Waterway =

Body of water in Louisiana and Texas, United States

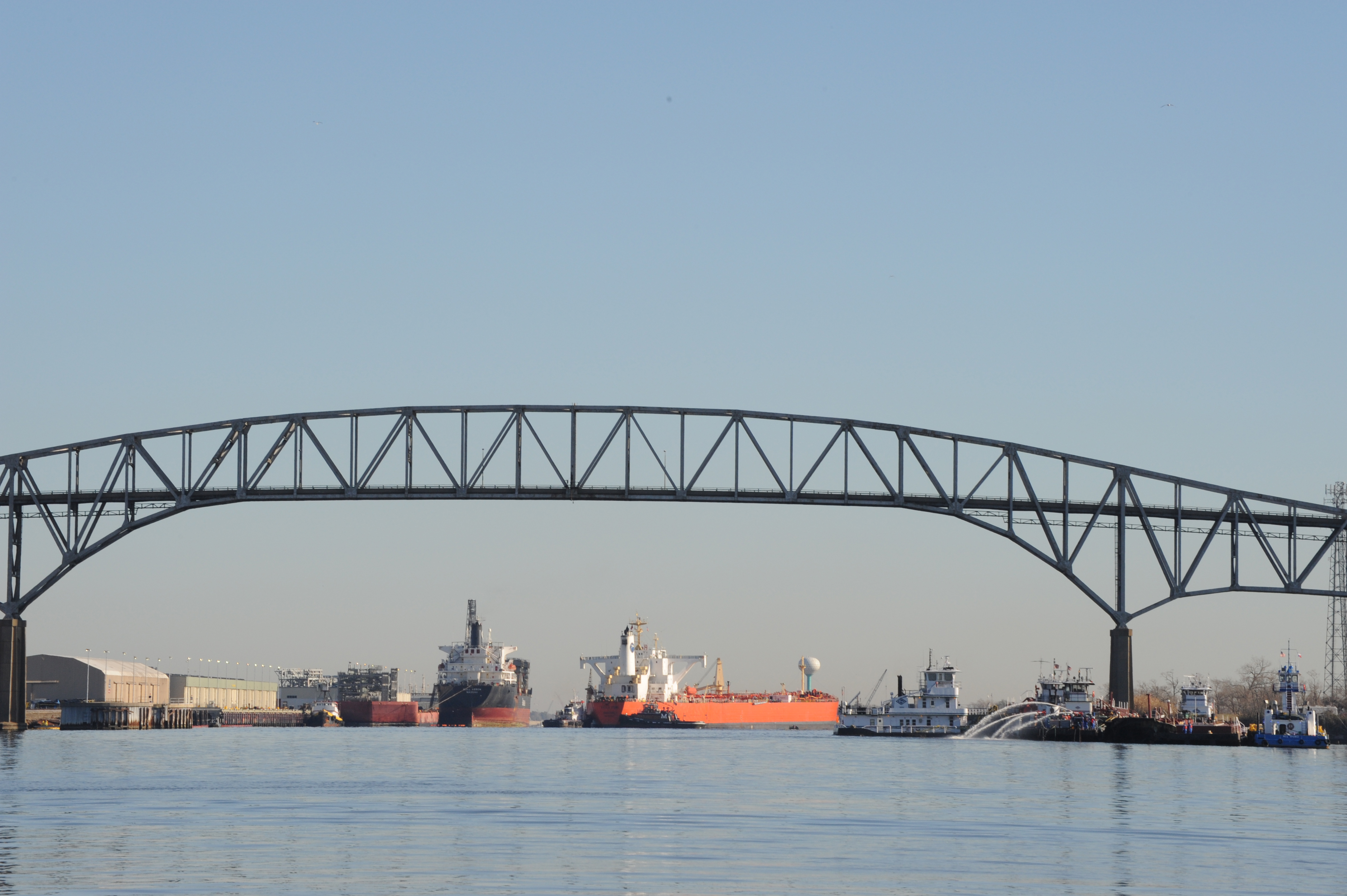
- Sabine–Neches Waterway near Port Arthur

- Location within Texas Location within Louisiana Location within the United States
- Interactive map of Sabine–Neches Waterway
- Location: Southeast Texas; Calcasieu Parish, Louisiana, U.S.
- Coordinates: 29°52′N 93°51′W
- Type: Waterway
- Primary inflows: Neches River; Sabine River; Taylor Bayou
- River sources: Neches River; Sabine River
- Primary outflows: Sabine Lake
- Ocean/sea sources: Gulf of Mexico
- Basin countries: United States
- Managing agency: Sabine–Neches Navigation District
- Built: 1909
- Max. length: 79 mi (127 km)miles
- Max. width: 400 ft (120 m)
- Average depth: 40 ft (12 m)
- Max. depth: 40 ft (12 m)
- Settlements: Beaumont, Texas; Orange, Texas; Port Arthur, Texas
- Website: www.navigationdistrict.org

The Sabine–Neches Waterway is located in southeast Texas and Calcasieu Parish, Louisiana, United States. The waterway includes parts of the Neches River, Sabine River, Sabine Lake, and Taylor Bayou. The waterway ranks as third-busiest waterway in the U.S. in terms of cargo tonnage, according to the American Association of Port Authorities. It also ranks as the top bulk liquid cargo waterway, the top U.S. crude-oil importer, and is projected to become the largest LNG exporter in the United States. The Gulf Intracoastal Waterway crosses the waterway near Port Arthur.

Two of the top twenty (20) ports in terms of tonnage are located on the waterway. The Port of Beaumont, ranked fourth (4th) in the 2013 U.S. Port Ranking by Cargo Tonnage survey is located at the northern end of the waterway. The Port of Port Arthur, ranked eighteenth (18th) in the same survey, is located near the southern end of the waterway. The Port of Orange is also served by the waterway.

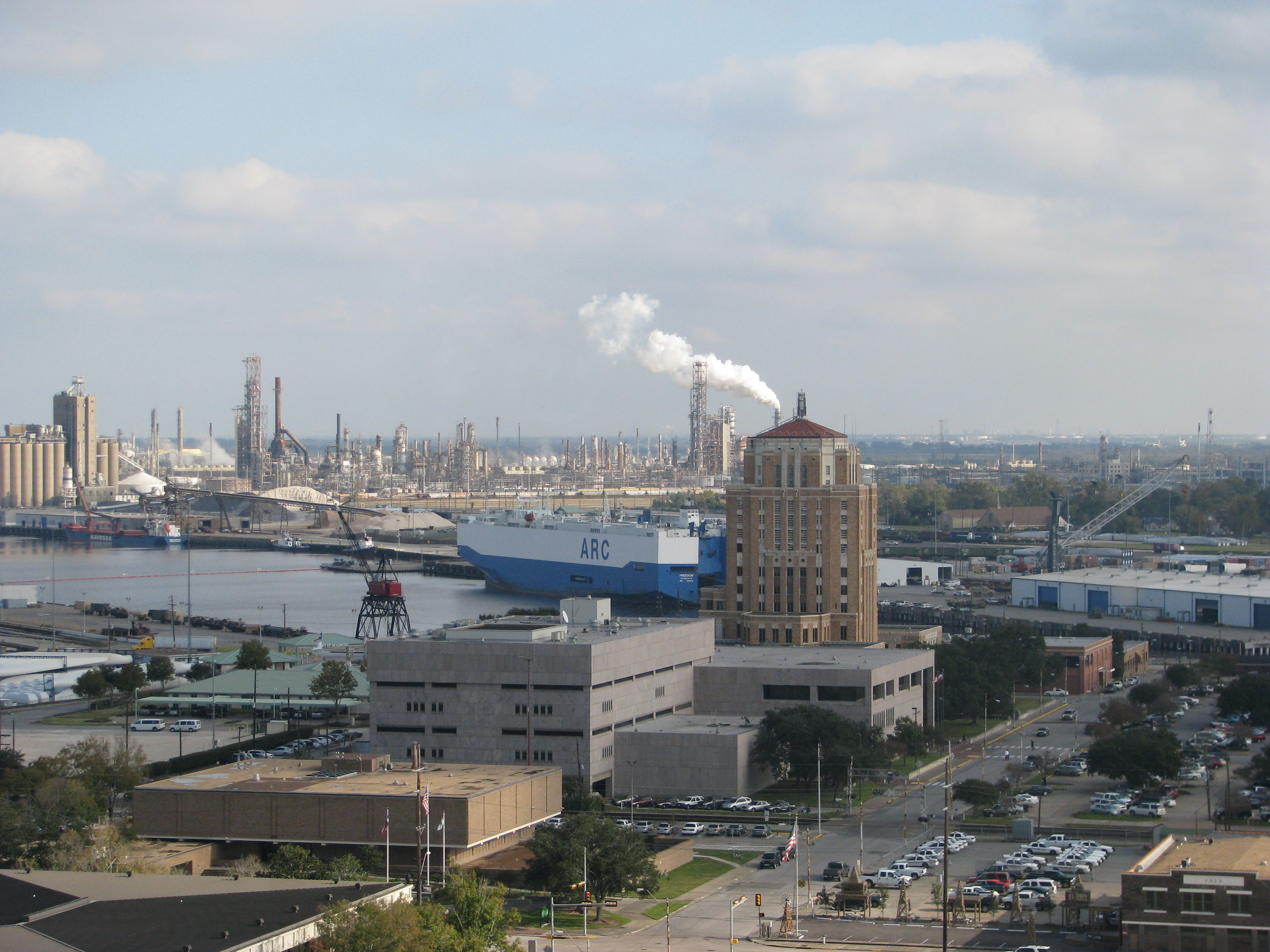
Port of Beaumont - northern end of the waterway

The waterway is currently a minimum of 40 feet deep and a minimum of 400 feet wide. In 2014, federal congressional approval was received to deepen the waterway to a depth of 48 feet. The $1.1 billion deepening project began in 2019 with an estimated project length of 12 to 15 years. The project was originally estimated to begin in 2017.

== History ==
The governing navigation district, Sabine–Neches Navigation District was formed in 1909. The channel was deepened to twenty-five (25) feet in 1912. Channel depth was increased to thirty (30) feet in 1925. The channel was deepened to thirty-five (35) feet in 1935. The channel was deepened to a minimum of forty (40) feet in 1962. United States Army Corps of Engineers New Start $18,000,000 funding was approved in mid November, 2018. The New Start phase was listed on the November 21, 2018 United States Army Corps of Engineers 2019 Work Plan. The Sabine–Neches Waterway Channel Improvement Project, which began in early 2019, will increase the channel depth to forty-eight (48) feet by its conclusion. It will also increase the waterway length from 64 miles to 77 miles.
