= Cameron Malveaux =

American football player (born 1994)

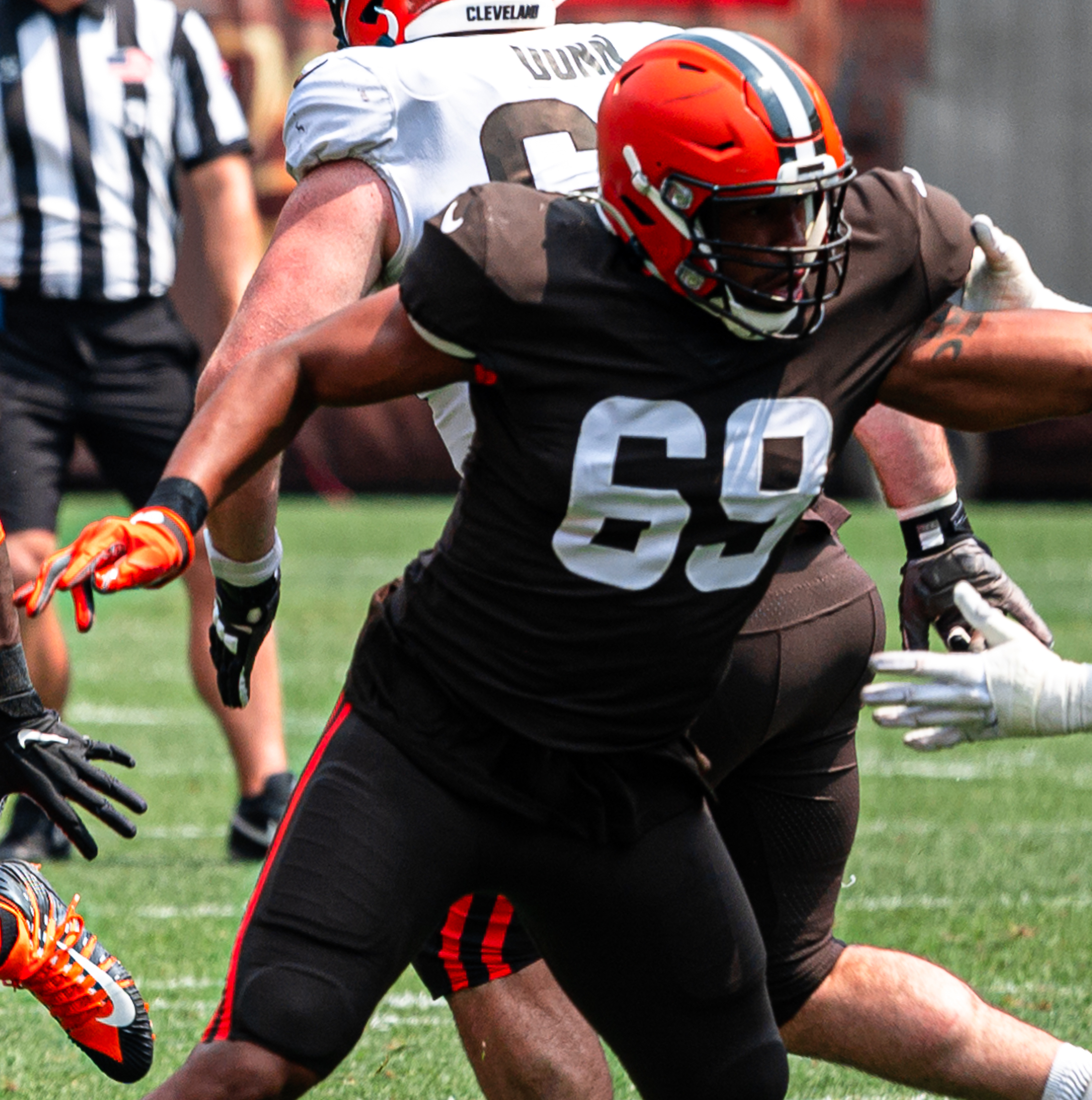
- Malveaux with the Cleveland Browns in 2021

No. 59, 69, 75, 94
- Position: Defensive end

Personal information
- Born: September 22, 1994 (age 32); Beaumont, Texas
- Listed height: 6 ft 6 in (1.98 m)
- Listed weight: 276 lb (125 kg)

Career information
- High school: Hamshire (TX)
- College: Houston
- NFL draft: 2017: undrafted

Career history
- Miami Dolphins (2017–2018); Arizona Cardinals (2018); Kansas City Chiefs (2019)*; Washington Redskins (2019–2020)*; San Francisco 49ers (2020)*; Cleveland Browns (2020); Philadelphia Eagles (2021)
- * Offseason or practice squad member only

Career NFL statistics
- Total tackles: 22
- Sacks: 2
- Forced fumbles: 1
- Stats at Pro Football Reference

Cameron Malveaux (born September 22, 1994) is an American former professional football player who was a defensive end in the National Football League (NFL). Malveaux signed with the Miami Dolphins as an undrafted free agent in 2017. He also played for the Arizona Cardinals, Cleveland Browns, and Philadelphia Eagles. He played college football for the Houston Cougars.

== High school ==
Malveaux attended Hamshire-Fannett High School in Texas and enrolled at the University of Houston in 2012.

== College career ==
Malveaux played in 52 games with 37 starts, finishing his career with 81 tackles, 17 tackles for loss, and 4 sacks. He was a 2016 team captain.

== Professional career ==
Pre-draft measurables
Height	Weight	Arm length	Hand span	40-yard dash	10-yard split	20-yard split	20-yard shuttle	Three-cone drill	Vertical jump	Broad jump	Bench press
6 ft 5 1/2 in (1.97 m)	273 lb (124 kg)	34 1/4 in (0.87 m)	10 1/4 in (0.26 m)	4.77 s	1.70 s	2.75 s	4.62 s	7.51 s	37.5 in (0.95 m)	10 ft 5 in (3.18 m)	21 reps
All values from Pro Day

=== Miami Dolphins ===
Malveaux signed with the Miami Dolphins as an undrafted free agent on May 5, 2017. He was waived on September 2, 2017, and was signed to the Dolphins' practice squad the next day. He was promoted to the active roster on December 2, 2017.

On September 1, 2018, Malveaux was waived by the Dolphins and was signed to the practice squad the next day. He was promoted to the active roster on October 2, 2018. He was waived on November 13, 2018, and re-signed to the practice squad.

=== Arizona Cardinals ===
On November 27, 2018, Malveaux was signed by the Arizona Cardinals off the Dolphins practice squad. He was released on August 31, 2019, during final roster cuts.

=== Kansas City Chiefs ===
Malveaux was signed to the Kansas City Chiefs practice squad on September 3, 2019. He was released on December 10, 2019.

=== Washington Redskins ===
The Washington Redskins signed Malveaux to their practice squad on December 17, 2019. He was signed to a reserve/future contract on December 30, 2019, but was waived on August 3, 2020.

=== San Francisco 49ers ===
Malveaux was signed by the San Francisco 49ers on September 2, 2020, but was waived at the end of camp.

=== Cleveland Browns ===
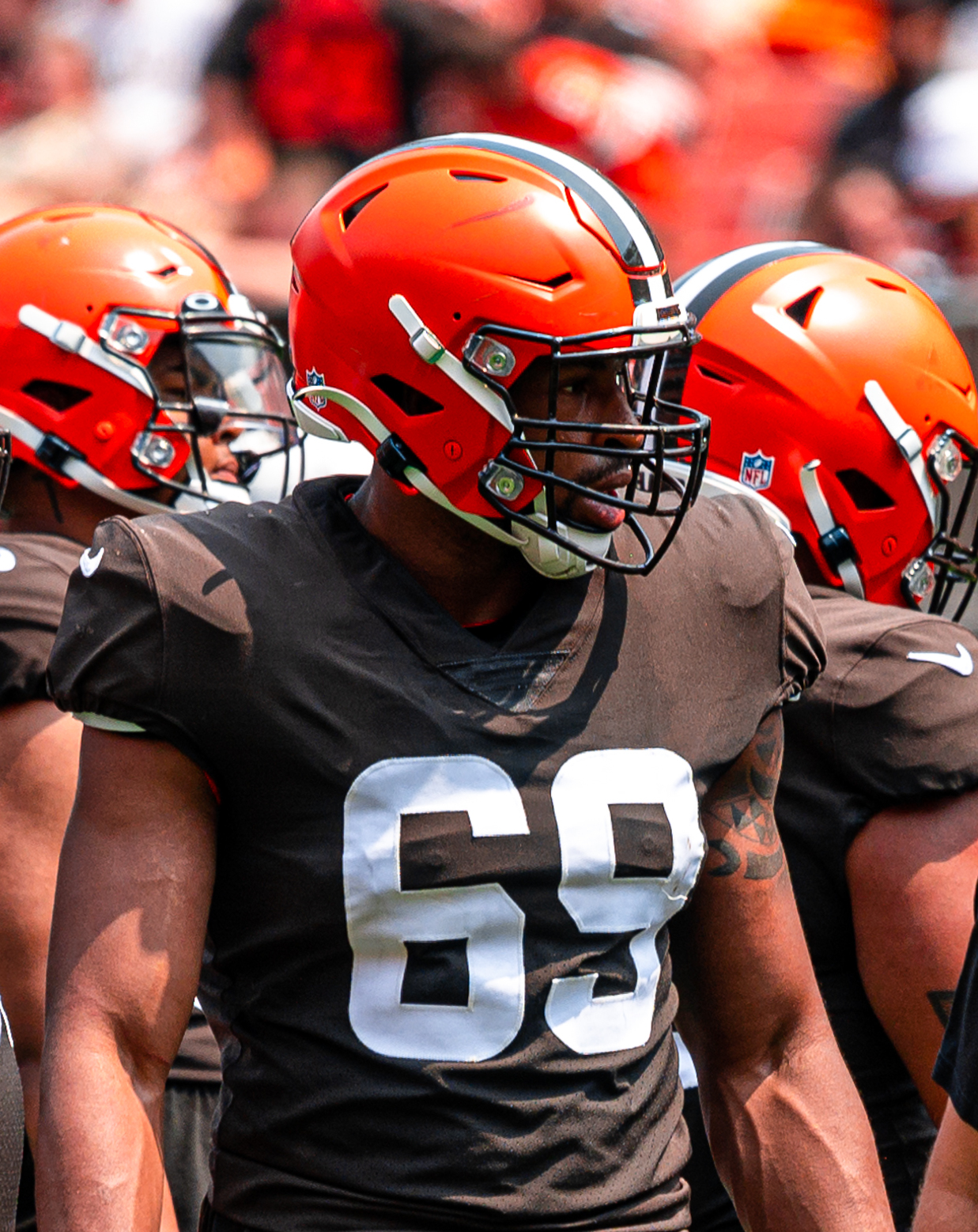
Cameron Malveaux (2021)

Malveaux was signed to the Cleveland Browns' practice squad on October 10, 2020. He was elevated to the active roster on November 21 and November 28 for the team's weeks 11 and 12 games against the Philadelphia Eagles and Jacksonville Jaguars, and reverted to the practice squad after each game.

Malveaux was signed to the Browns' reserve/futures list on January 18, 2021. Malveaux was waived by the Browns on August 31, 2021.

=== Philadelphia Eagles ===
Malveaux was signed to the Philadelphia Eagles' practice squad on September 29, 2021. He signed a reserve/future contract with the Eagles on January 18, 2022. On April 21, 2022, Malveaux announced his retirement from the NFL.
