= Boondocks Road =

Road in Texas, United States

Coordinates: 29°51′31″N 94°13′27″W

Boondocks Road (formerly Jap Road) is a 4.3-mile (6.9-kilometer) road in Fannett, Texas.

== History ==
In the early 20th century, Japanese immigrant Yoshio Mayumi and his brother Yasuo settled in Fannett, purchasing 1734 acres (7 km^{2}) of land. The two brought with them techniques for rice farming, which became the dominant agricultural activity of Jefferson County.

According to local tradition, in 1905 area residents collaborated to build a road to the Mayumi farm, and named the road "Jap Road" in their honor.

In 1924, Mayumi returned to Japan. Low rice prices and smaller harvests due to mismanaged land had rendered his farm unprofitable. The Immigration Act of 1924 and related anti-immigrant sentiment are also considered contributing factors to Mayumi's decision to leave the country.

== Controversy ==
Although Jap Road was named to honor its Japanese residents, by the end of the 20th century its name had taken on a new meaning. During World War II, "Jap" went from being an abbreviation for "Japanese" to an ethnic slur.

In 1993, advocacy groups, led by Beaumont teacher Sandra Nakata, began pressuring the Jefferson County commissioners to change the name. The county commissioners responded by stating that "Jap Road" was not an ethnic slur and honored the road's original Japanese residents. They did, however, give the road's residents the chance to change the name if they so chose. Area residents, including descendants of the Japanese settlers, were highly resistant to any name change. Further efforts in 1999 also met with no success.

In 2004, the Japanese American Citizens League and the Anti-Defamation League filed complaints with the US Department of Transportation and the Department of Housing and Urban Development. Finally bowing to outside pressure, the Jefferson County commissioners ordered Jap Road's residents to select a new name by July 29, 2004. They chose opposition leaders Wayne Wright and Earl Callahan to oversee the selection.

The options presented to the road's residents included "Mayumi Road', "Japanese Road", "Japan Road", and "Boondocks Road". Out of 170 voting residents, over 100 chose "Boondocks Road". The Boondocks was a popular catfish restaurant that had closed a decade earlier. Anger at outside groups characterizing them as racists is the common explanation for residents' decision to entirely avoid using any of the Japanese-related names.

== See also ==
- Boondocks
