= Hamshire-Fannett High School =

Location
- 12552 Second St. Hamshire, Texas 77622; United States; 29.8626°N 94.3141°W

Information
- School type: Public high school
- School district: Hamshire-Fannett Independent School District
- Principal: Debra Nolte
- Teaching staff: 44.64 (FTE)
- Grades: 9-12
- Enrollment: 620 (2023–2024)
- Student to teacher ratio: 13.89
- Colors: Blue and gold
- Athletics conference: UIL Class AAAA
- Mascot: Longhorn
- Yearbook: Round-Up
- Website: hfhs.hfisd.net

Hamshire-Fannett High School is a public high school located in Hamshire, Texas, United States and classified as a 4A school by the University Interscholastic League (UIL). It is part of the Hamshire-Fannett Independent School District located in western Jefferson County. In 2015, the school was rated "Met Standard" by the Texas Education Agency.

== Athletics ==
The Hamshire-Fannett Longhorns compete in the following sports: Cross Country, Volleyball, Football, Basketball, Soccer, Golf, Tennis, Track, Softball & Baseball
