= Fannett, Texas =

- Census-designated place
- Location within Texas Location within the United States
- Coordinates: 29°55′26″N 94°14′52″W
- Country: United States
- State: Texas
- County: Jefferson

Area
  - Total: 9.9 sq mi (25.6 km^{2})
  - Land: 9.8 sq mi (25.4 km^{2})
  - Water: 0.077 sq mi (0.2 km^{2})
- Elevation: 20 ft (6.1 m)

Population (2020)
  - Total: 2,363
  - Density: 230/sq mi (88.7/km^{2})
- Time zone: UTC-6 (Central (CST))
  - Summer (DST): UTC-5 (CDT)
- ZIP Code: 77705
- FIPS code: 48-25404
- GNIS feature ID: 2586930

Fannett is an unincorporated community and census-designated place (CDP) in Jefferson County, Texas, United States. The population was 2,363 at the 2020 census. It is about 15 miles (24 km) southwest of Beaumont and is part of the Beaumont–Port Arthur metropolitan area.

== History ==
The community is named after B. J. Fannett, a local landowner who opened a general store there in the 1890s. When Japanese immigrants brought rice farming to the area, Fannett grew to meet the farmers' needs.

In 1993 and again in 2004, Fannett was the center of a controversy over the naming of Jap Road (now Boondocks Road). The road had been named in the early 20th century in reference to the immigrant rice farmer Yoshio Mayumi. However, as social awareness increased over time, it became clear that the name was never meant to honor Mayumi and had always been an ethnic slur. Instead of naming the road after Mayumi, it was decided to change the name to Boondocks Road.

Fannett is home to the Clifton Steamboat Museum, which features a large exhibit on Lieutenant Commander Harry Brinkley Bass (after whom the United States Navy destroyer USS Brinkley Bass was named).

== Demographics ==
Historical population
Census	Pop.	Note	%±
2010	2,252		—
2020	2,363		4.9%
U.S. Decennial Census; 1850–1900 1910; 1920 1930 1940; 1950 1960 1970; 1980 1990 2000; 2010 2020

Fannett first appeared as a census designated place in the 2010 U.S. census.

Fannett CDP, Texas – Racial and ethnic composition Note: the US Census treats Hispanic/Latino as an ethnic category. This table excludes Latinos from the racial categories and assigns them to a separate category. Hispanics/Latinos may be of any race.
Race / Ethnicity (NH = Non-Hispanic)	Pop 2010	Pop 2020	% 2010	% 2020
White alone (NH)	1,878	1,785	83.39%	75.54%
Black or African American alone (NH)	93	161	4.13%	6.81%
Native American or Alaska Native alone (NH)	4	1	0.18%	0.04%
Asian alone (NH)	44	68	1.95%	2.88%
Native Hawaiian or Pacific Islander alone (NH)	0	3	0.00%	0.13%
Other race alone (NH)	0	2	0.00%	0.08%
Mixed race or Multiracial (NH)	15	83	0.67%	3.51%
Hispanic or Latino (any race)	218	260	9.68%	11.00%
Total	2,252	2,363	100.00%	100.00%

As of the 2020 United States census, there were 2,363 people, 871 households, and 588 families residing in the CDP.

== Education ==
In 1961, the Fannett Independent School District was combined with that of neighboring Hamshire, forming the Hamshire-Fannett Independent School District.

Hamshire-Fannett ISD is assigned to Galveston College in Galveston.
