= Hamshire =

Hamshire may refer to:

- Hamshire, Texas, an unincorporated community in Jefferson County
- Hampshire, a county on the southern coast of England
