= Cheek, Texas =

- Unincorporated community
- Location within Texas Location within the United States
- Coordinates: 29°59′01″N 94°12′10″W
- Country: United States
- State: Texas
- County: Jefferson
- Elevation: 20 ft (6.1 m)
- Time zone: UTC-6 (Central (CST))
  - Summer (DST): UTC-5 (CDT)
- Postal code: 77713
- Area code: 409
- GNIS feature ID: 1354336

Cheek is an unincorporated community, southwest of Beaumont in central Jefferson County, Texas, United States. In 1906, it was established by John R. Cheek. Although an identifiable community remains with a population of 550, the area is included within Beaumont city's jurisdiction.

== Location ==
Cheek is located within Precinct 4 of Jefferson County. Precinct 4 is divided into four zones. Zone 1 and Zone 2 describe the area known as Cheek.

Zone 1

Boyt Road Area:

Kidd Rd to Boyt Rd
Boyt Rd from Blossom Rd to Deshotel Rd
Martel Height Area:
Lawhon Rd from Gums St to Bluebird Way
Lawhon Rd from South China to Hwy 365
Zone 2

Township of Cheek:

Blewett Rd from Avenue C to Industrial Rd

== History ==
The Gulf & Interstate Railway Company, later amended to The Gulf & Interstate Railway Company of Texas, was chartered by C. J. and N. C. Jones on May 19, 1894. Its intent was to improve economic development by connecting Port Bolivar, on one of the headlands to Galveston Bay, with the Red River. By 1896, the Gulf and Interstate Railroad to Beaumont stopped in Bolivar Point, allowing local farmers to ship their produce to market on iced rail cars. Previously, produce was taken to Galveston by boat. Trains connecting to Galveston were taken across the bay on a barge. The railway was completed only to Beaumont by 1897, according to Reed and Zlatkovich; although the hurricane in 1900 destroyed more than twenty-eight miles of the road between Beaumont and Port Bolivar, and it was repaired in 1904.

In 1906, John R. Cheek established a stop for the Gulf and Interstate Railway to provide services for farmers and passengers midway between Beaumont and Winnie. The area was inhabited largely by rice farmers who used the Beaumont Irrigating Company's canal, which cut through Cheek and irrigated the surrounding farms. The Cheek Common School District, organized in 1907 and bolstered by the construction in 1939 of a new school building by the Public Works Administration. In 1912, J.R. Cheek supervised Cheek & Heyman Lumber Co as was common for leaders of railroad operations to also hold key positions at lumber mills of the time. By 1925, Cheek's population was estimated to be forty. The post office was discontinued in 1928. By the 1970s a large Goodyear and Gulfco plant were located nearby.

== Religion ==
Cheek has hosted a variety of religious worship centers over the years. New Bethel Baptist Church originating in 1957 and St. Martin de Porres Catholic Church originating in 1962 are two of the oldest establishments located in the heart of the community. Currently, both congregations actively offer regular worship services and venues for special celebrations.

== Education ==
Cheek Elementary School was supported by the local community in the 1940s and beyond as an independent school district. The school served as a community center for the surrounding area. Later Cheek School was incorporated into the South Park School District of Beaumont. The Cheek School no longer exists.

Primary education is provided by the following:

- Hardin-Jefferson Independent School District for students in west and northwest regions
- Hamshire-Fannett Independent School District for students in south and southeast regions
- Beaumont Independent School District for students in north and northeast regions

== Law and government ==
Cheek is served by the Jefferson County Sheriff's Office.

Cheek Volunteer Fire Department And Ambulance Service is located at 8523 Kidd Rd and is operated by community leaders.

Cheek hosts the Precinct 4 Service Center where the former Fanshire Elementary School was converted to meet the needs of the community.

Such services include:

- Maintenance of roads and bridges
- Constructing driveways and installing culverts
- Signage and striping of roads
- Ditching
- Grass cutting
- Elections
- Public health fair
- Southeast Texas Super Seniors
- Summer nutrition program
