= Beauxart Gardens, Texas =

- Census-designated place
- Location within Texas
- Coordinates: 29°57′30″N 94°02′08″W
- Country: United States
- State: Texas
- County: Jefferson
- Elevation: 13 ft (4.0 m)

Population (2020)
  - Total: 1,064
- Time zone: UTC-6 (Central (CST))
  - Summer (DST): UTC-5 (CDT)
- GNIS feature ID: 2805796

Beauxart Gardens is an unincorporated community and census-designated place (CDP) in eastern Jefferson County, Texas, United States. It is located between U.S. Highway 69, U.S. Highway 96, U.S. Highway 287, and Spur 93. The community is six miles (10 km) southeast of downtown Beaumont and slightly to the west of Southeast Texas Regional Airport. It is across a highway from the unincorporated community of Viterbo. It was first listed as a CDP in the 2020 census with a population of 1,064.

== History ==
At one time, residents of Nederland and Viterbo used sites in Beauxart Gardens for rice farming. The Federal Government of the United States developed Beauxart Gardens during the Great Depression. The community was named for its location between Beaumont and Port Arthur. The town plat, filed in 1934, was approved by the Resettlement Administration in 1935. The 205-acre (0.83 km^{2}) tract housed 50 families. Each house had three to six rooms and three and one half acres of land; each household was permitted to use the land in any manner. Many of the residents held part-time jobs at refineries. For the remainder of each year, they worked in the Beauxart Gardens government truck farm. On August 10, 1942, a voting precinct was established in the community.

== Demographics ==
Historical population
| Census | Pop. | Note | %± |
|---|---|---|---|
| 2020 | 1,064 | | — |
U.S. Decennial Census; 1850–1900 1910; 1920 1930 1940; 1950 1960 1970; 1980 1990 2000; 2010 2020

Beauxart Gardens first appeared as a census designated place in the 2020 U.S. census.

=== 2020 Census ===
Beauxart Gardens CDP, Texas – Racial and ethnic composition Note: the US Census treats Hispanic/Latino as an ethnic category. This table excludes Latinos from the racial categories and assigns them to a separate category. Hispanics/Latinos may be of any race.
| Race / Ethnicity (NH = Non-Hispanic) | Pop 2020 | % 2020 |
|---|---|---|
| White alone (NH) | 852 | 80.08% |
| Black or African American alone (NH) | 5 | 0.47% |
| Native American or Alaska Native alone (NH) | 0 | 0.00% |
| Asian alone (NH) | 17 | 1.60% |
| Native Hawaiian or Pacific Islander alone (NH) | 0 | 0.00% |
| Other race alone (NH) | 4 | 0.38% |
| Mixed race or Multiracial (NH) | 49 | 4.61% |
| Hispanic or Latino (any race) | 137 | 12.88% |
| Total | 1,064 | 100.00% |

== Education ==
The majority of the land is in the Nederland Independent School District; the land extends into the Port Arthur Independent School District.
