= Sabine-Southwestern War =

The Sabine-Southwestern War was a military conflict in the United States from 1836 to 1837. It was a war with Native Americans in Louisiana along the Sabine River, the border between the Republic of Texas and the United States.
