= Viterbo, Texas =

Unincorporated community in Texas, US

Coordinates: 29°57′21″N 94°02′35″W

Viterbo is an unincorporated community in central Jefferson County, Texas, United States. It is located along West Port Arthur Road and the Southern Pacific Railroad, seven miles (11 km) south of downtown Beaumont and across a highway from the unincorporated area of Beauxart Gardens.

A railroad stop was established during a period after 1898. It was named after J. and L. Viterbo, who were Italian American rice farmers who left Lake Charles, Louisiana, for Texas in 1895; the brothers wanted more inexpensive land prices. The brothers purchased a 1,600-acre (6.5 km^{2}) tract north of the Hillebrandt Bayou and established a farm there. In the 1970s the Viterbo area had many ditches, irrigation canals, and pumping stations.
