= Sabine River (Texas–Louisiana) =

River in the United States

Sabine River Río Sabine (Spanish) Fleuve Sabine (French)
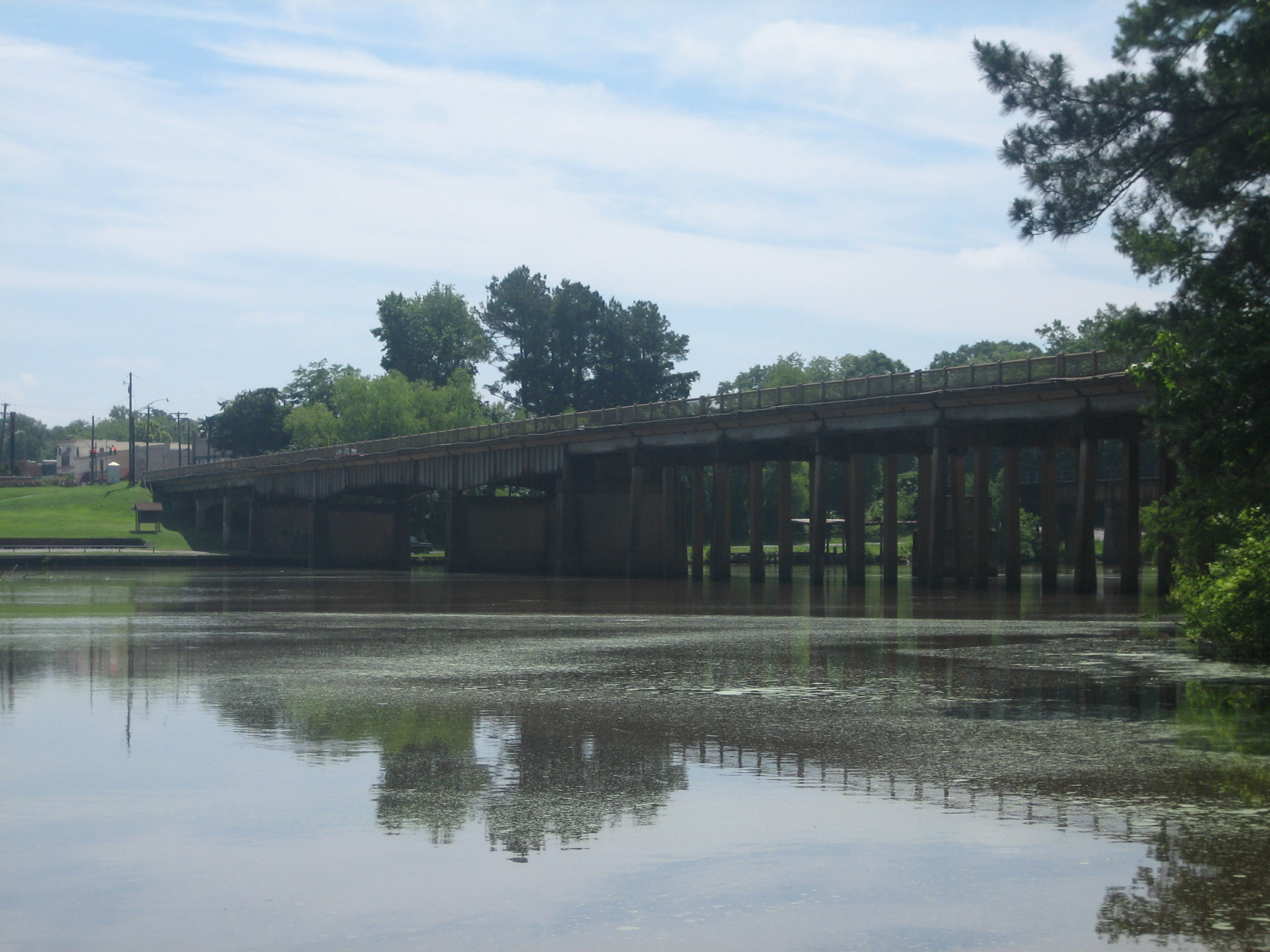
- Sabine River at Logansport, Louisiana

- Location of the mouth of the Sabine River in Texas

Location
- Country: United States
- States: Texas; Louisiana
- Counties: Hunt; Rains; Van Zandt; Wood; Smith; Gregg; Harrison; Rusk; Panola; Shelby; Sabine; Newton; Orange
- Parishes: DeSoto; Sabine; Vernon; Beauregard; Calcasieu; Cameron

Physical characteristics
- Source: Iron Bridge Dam
  - location: Lake Tawakoni, Van Zandt County, Texas
  - coordinates: 32°48′29″N 95°55′14″W
  - elevation: 423 ft (129 m)
- Mouth: Sabine Lake
  - location: Texas–Louisiana border, near Orange, Orange County, Texas and Cameron Parish, Louisiana
  - coordinates: 29°59′08″N 93°47′26″W
  - elevation: 0 ft (0 m)
- Length: 510 mi (820 km)
- Basin size: 9,756 sq mi (25,270 km^{2})
- Discharge
  - average: 8,400 cu ft/s (240 m^{3}/s)

The Sabine River (/səˈbiːn/) is a 360-mile (580 km) long river in the Southern U.S. states of Texas and Louisiana, From the 32nd parallel north and downstream, it serves as part of the boundary between the two states and empties into Sabine Lake, an estuary of the Gulf of Mexico.

Over the first half of the 19th century, the river formed part of the Spanish–American, Mexican–American, and Texan–American international boundaries. The upper reaches of the river flow through the prairie country of northeast Texas. Along much of its lower reaches, it flows through pine forests along the Texas–Louisiana border, and eventually the bayou country near the Gulf Coast.

The river drains an area of 9,756 square miles (25,270 km^{2}), of which 7,426 square miles (19,230 km^{2}) are in Texas and 2,330 square miles (6,000 km^{2}) in Louisiana. It flows through an area of abundant rainfall and discharges the largest volume of any river in Texas. The name Sabine (es: Río de Sabinas) comes from the Spanish word for cypress, in reference to the extensive growth of bald cypresses along the lower river. The river flows through an important petroleum-producing region, and the lower river near the Gulf is among the most industrialized areas of the southeastern United States. The river was often described as the dividing line between the Old South and the New Southwest.

== Description ==
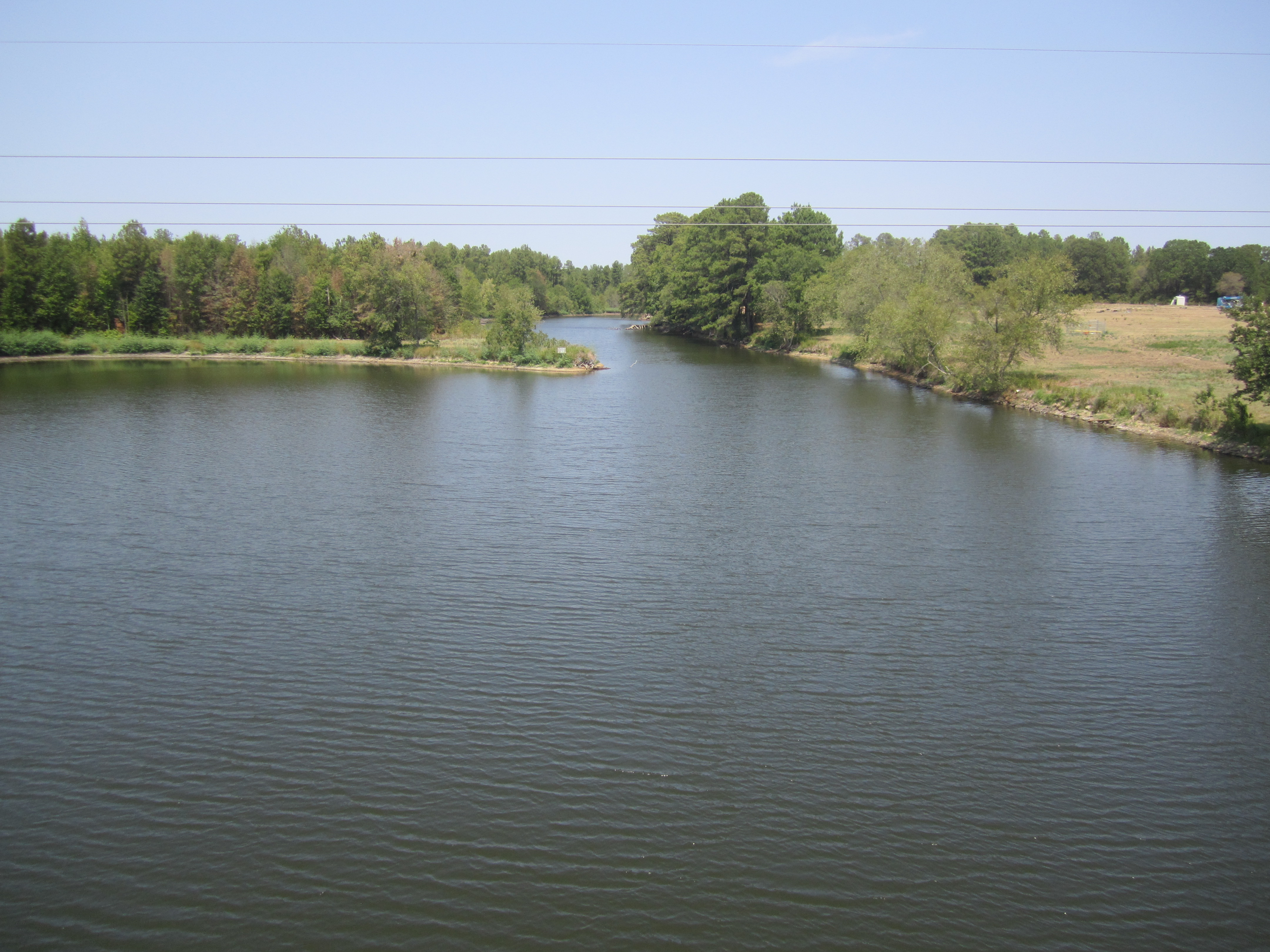
The Sabine just south of U.S. Route 80 near Big Sandy, Texas

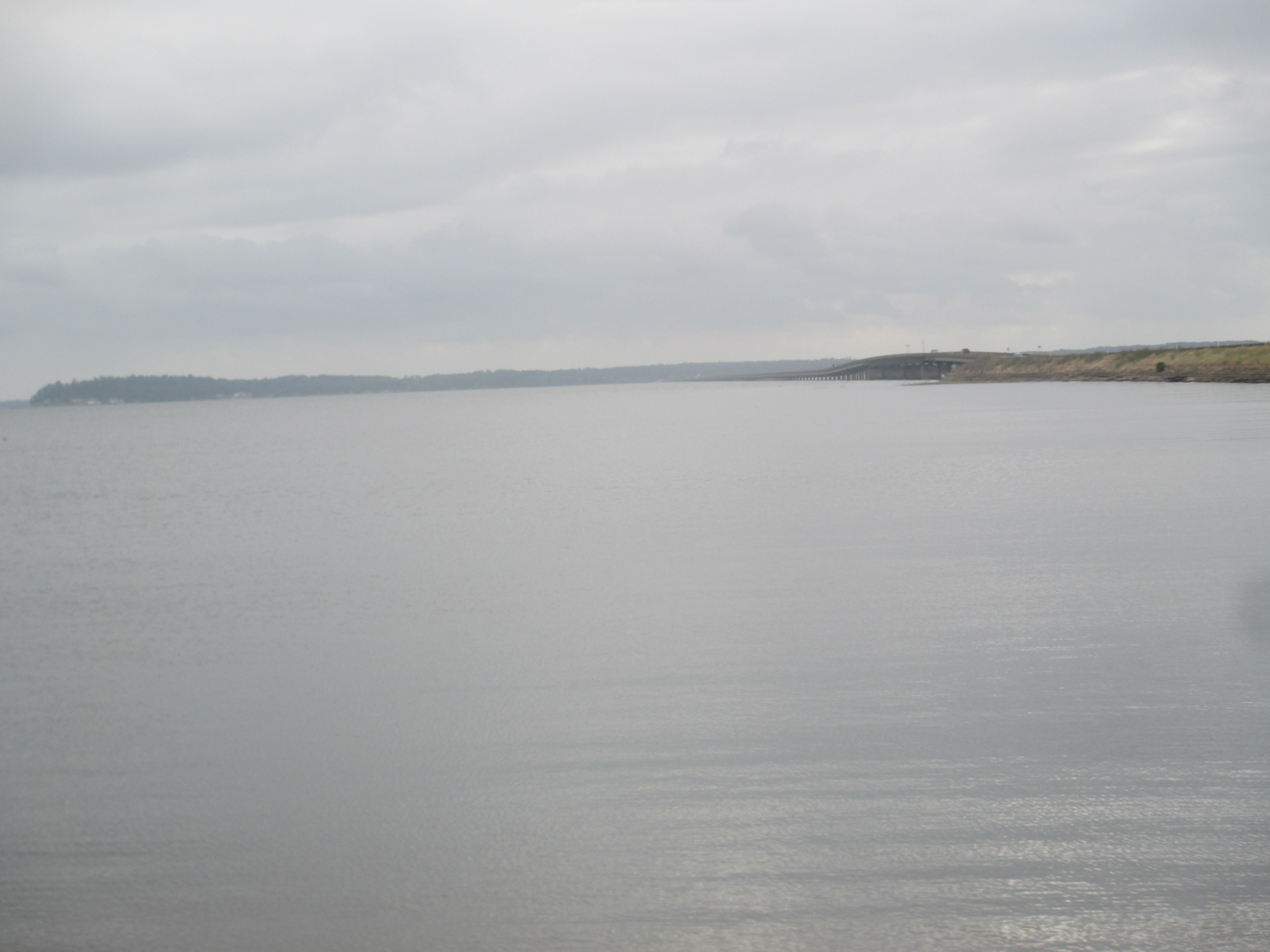
The Sabine forms the Louisiana/Texas boundary at Toledo Bend Reservoir west of Many, Louisiana.

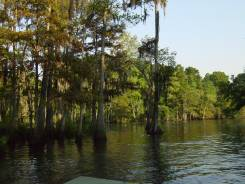
The Sabine River in Orange, Texas

The Sabine rises in northeast Texas by the union of three branches: the Cowleech Fork, Caddo Fork, and South Fork. The Cowleech Fork rises in northwestern Hunt County and flows southeast for 49.2 miles (79.2 km). The Caddo Fork, shown as "Caddo Creek" on federal maps, rises in two tributary forks, the East Caddo Fork and the West Caddo Fork, in northwestern Hunt County. The South Fork rises in the southwestern corner of Hunt County and flows east for 28.3 miles (45.5 km), joining the Caddo Fork and Cowleech Fork in southeastern Hunt County. The confluence of the forks is now submerged in the Lake Tawakoni reservoir. The combined river flows southeast across northeast Texas and is joined by a fourth branch, Lake Fork Creek, 70.0 miles (112.7 km) downstream from the reservoir.

In northeast Texas, the river flows past Kilgore, Mineola, Gladewater, Big Sandy, and Longview, the largest city on the river, to southwest of Shreveport at the 32nd parallel north, where it establishes the Texas-Louisiana boundary. It flows south, forming the state line for the remainder of its course. It is impounded 10 miles (16 km) west of Leesville, Louisiana, to form the 70-mile-long (110 km) Toledo Bend Reservoir, with the Sabine National Forest along its western bank. South of the reservoir, it passes through the bayou country, surrounded by wetlands, as well as widespread industrial areas near the Gulf Coast. Approximately 10 miles (16 km) south of Orange, it meets the Neches River from the west to form the 17-mile-long (27 km) and 7-mile-wide (11 km) Sabine Lake, which drains through Sabine Pass to the Gulf of Mexico. The city of Port Arthur, Texas, sits along the western shore of Sabine Lake

== History ==
Archeological evidence indicates the valley of the river has been inhabited for as long as 12,000 years by indigenous peoples. Starting in the eighth century, the Caddo inhabited the area, building extensive earthwork mounds in complexes expressing their cosmology. The Caddo culture flourished until the late 13th century. Descendants of the Caddo were living along the river when the first European explorers arrived in the 16th century.

The river was named in 1716 by Spanish explorer Domingo Ramón, and appeared as Río de Sabinas on a 1721 map. The river was used by French traders, and at various times, the river was claimed by both Spain and France. After the acquisition by Spain of the French territory of Louisiana in 1763, following France's defeat by Great Britain in the Seven Years' War, the capital of the Spanish province of Texas was established at Los Adaes on the east side of the river, near present-day Robeline, Louisiana.

After acquiring the French territory west of the Mississippi River in 1803 Louisiana Purchase, the United States started to exert control in this area. It was at war with Native Americans in Louisiana along the Sabine River from 1836 to 1837, in the period when it was trying to remove the Indians to Indian Territory from the Southeast.

=== River transportation ===
The Sabine River was too deep to ford, and proved to be navigable. Early travelers and settlers would have to swim the river on horseback and cattle would have to be driven into the river to swim across. Ferries were later put into service. By the 1840s, steamboats were travelling from Logansport to Sabine Lake.

==== Ferries ====
Recorded ferry use began 1794, when Louis Chabinan (Sharben), his wife Margarite LaFleur, and their four children settled on the east bank of the Sabine River on land purchased from Vicinte Michele. Chabinan built a ferry landing on the river called Paso del Chaland. Louisiana State Highway 6 (La 6) and Texas State Highway 21 now meet near here, at the site of the present-day Pendleton Bridge. In 1796, Chabinan was drowned after being kicked by a horse and falling into the Sabine.

Michel Crow married his widow and ran the ferry, until he sold it to James Gaines circa 1819; it was renamed Gaines Ferry. This ferry was in service until 1937, when it was replaced by the Pendleton Bridge, built during the Great Depression. Crow also operated a ferry he had started upriver, a 120-foot crossing started in 1796. It linked what became known as Carter's Ferry Road, now Texas FM 276. Carter's ferry was 25 miles from San Augustine and 15 miles from Many, Louisiana. Crow sold the ferry to Carter, who became the namesake. Farther north, and just above Bayou Lanan, was Williamson Ferry. Other ferries on the Sabine River:

- Burr's ferry (Hickman's Ferry)
- Hadden's ferry (Bevil's crossing)
- Ballew's ferry
- Sabinetown (Sabine Town) ferry
- Gaines Ferry: (Chabinan then Pendleton; Sabinetown, Tx 4.9 miles SSE)
- Carter's ferry: (Located SSE of La 191 after crossing hwy 1215; still known as Carter's Ferry Road)
- Chamber's ferry: (2.5 miles SSE of East Hamilton and 11.6 miles NNW of Sabinetown)
- Cline's ferry: (Bivens 10.3 miles S)
- Gilcrease Ferry: (Sabinetown 2.4 miles WNW, same location as Godwin's Ferry)
- Darnell Ferry: (East Hamilton, Tx. 1.9 miles SW)
- Thompson's ferry:
- Loftin ferry (Circa 1894): On the Sabine just west of Evans, Louisiana, that is a few miles north of Burr's ferry.

The main Sabine River crossings were the El Camino Real (King's Highway) from Natchitoches, or "Upper Route" from Shreveport; and the "Lower" Route, from Opelousas called "The Old Beef Trail". It was used to drive thousands of cattle from Texas to Alexandria, Louisiana, for shipment to cities such as New Orleans. Hickman Ferry was a shipping point for areas as far west as Burkeville. Sabine River ports from Sabine Pass in river mileage were "Belgrade", 171 miles; "Stark's Landing" 191 miles; "Loftin Ferry", and "Bayou Lanacoco" 220 miles; "Hickman's Ferry" 252 miles; "Burnham's Landing" 261 miles; and "Burr's Ferry" 281 miles.

=== Border dispute ===
The area's geography remained one of the least understood in the region. Various Spanish maps had errors in the naming of the Sabine and Neches and sometimes showed them flowing independently into the Gulf of Mexico. After the Louisiana Purchase by the United States in 1803, a dispute over the boundary between the U.S. and Spain led to a demilitarized zone agreement on November 6, 1806, negotiated by Gen. James Wilkinson and Lt. Col. Simón de Herrera, to establish a neutral territory on both sides of the river. Neither country would put military troops or civil police there.

The indefinite boundary was resolved by the Adams–Onis Treaty of 1819, which established the Sabine River as the boundary from the Gulf to the 32nd parallel. The Spanish delay in the ratification of the treaty, and Mexico gaining independence in 1821, reignited the boundary dispute. The United States, at the insistence of Anthony Butler, claimed for a while that the names of the Sabine and Neches had been reversed, thus they claimed that the treaty established the boundary at the Neches. The first Anglo-American settlers began arriving in the region in the 1820s, soon outnumbering the Mexicans by ten to one. After the independence of the Republic of Texas from Mexico in 1836, the boundary between the U.S. and Texas was firmly established at the Sabine in accordance with the Adams–Onís Treaty. The river served as the western boundary of the United States until the Texas Annexation in 1845. In July 1848, the 30th United States Congress passed a public law endorsing the government of the United States to the Texas legislature to extend the Texas eastern boundary. The Act of Congress provisioned the State of Texas to geographical limits for incorporating one half of the Sabine Pass, Sabine Lake, and Sabine River, as far north as ― International Boundary Marker ― the thirty-second degree of north latitude.

==== Riverboats ====
In 1843, Capt. John Clemmons made the first trip up the Sabine in the steamboat Sabine. Steamboats carried passengers, as well as commodities such as cotton, from as far north as Logansport, Louisiana, down to Sabine Pass.

The pirate Jean Lafitte made many trips up the Sabine and reportedly started the colony of Shacklefoot on the Texas side of the Sabine River, south of Carter's ferry up Bayou Patroon.

During the American Civil War, on September 8, 1863, a small Confederate force thwarted a Union invasion of Texas at the Second Battle of Sabine Pass, fought at the mouth of the river.

In the late 19th and early 20th centuries, the middle course of the river was an area of widespread logging. The discovery of petroleum at nearby Spindletop led to the river basin becoming the scene of widespread oil drilling. The lower river became heavily industrialized, and developed with many oil refineries and chemical plants. Such alteration to the wetlands resulted in a degradation of the water quality. Since the late 20th century, there have been federal, state, and local efforts to restore the quality of the river. In addition, draining of wetlands and dredging of bayous has caused decline in the acreage of wetlands, resulting in coastal erosion, and making the area much more vulnerable to hurricane damage.

The lower river, south of Orange to Sabine Lake, forms part of the Intracoastal Waterway, carrying barge traffic and some pleasure boats.

As a young man, Captain Bill McDonald of the Texas Rangers operated a small store at Brown's Bluff (modern-day Elderville) on the Sabine in Gregg County, Texas.

==== Toledo Bend reservoir ====
Hadden's Ferry was the site of the ground-breaking ceremony held on October 5, 1961, for the 181,600-acre Toledo Bend Reservoir. Dedicated October 11, 1969, the reservoir is the largest human-made lake in the South. Flooding of lands along the Sabine River behind the dam inundated all the ferry sites within its boundary.

== Sabine River Diversion Canal ==
The 1970 Louisiana Legislature passed Acts 90 and 117, creating the Sabine River Diversion Canal, for the purpose of supplying fresh river water to businesses in Lake Charles, Sulphur, Westlake, and what was Mossville (now the Sasol complex), as well as to farmers along the canal, with a total capacity of 216,000,000 US gallons (820,000,000 L; 180,000,000 imp gal) a day. The canal was completed by the Louisiana Department of Public Works in 1981. The canal is 35 miles (56 km) long, with about 4.5 miles (7.2 km) of underground pipe, and begins on the Old Sabine River 2.5 miles (4.0 km) north of Niblett's Bluff. Pump station #1 is located two miles east of the river. The canal continues running east, piped under roadways such as Louisiana Highway 109 north of Vinton, the Edgerly Big Woods road, and Highway 388, which runs to Dequincy.

Just east of Louisiana Highway 27, the canal forks to the south, running around southern Sulphur. The canal is piped under Louisiana Highway 108, at pumping station #4, providing river water to the business area known as City Service in Westlake, and companies such as Equistar, which has a daily contract for 734,400 gallons a day. Other customers and their gallons of use per day are the city of Westlake (8,640,000 gallons), Air Liquide (129,600), Air Products (1,728,000), CITGO (20,160,000), Phillips 66 (3,600,000), The Axiall subsidiary Eagle US 2 LLC (20,160,000), Entergy (21,600,000), Lake Charles Co-Gen (14,400,000), Louisiana Pigment (3,038,400) that produces Titanium White, another LyondellBasell company (720,000), and Matheson Tri-Gas (175,680).

The main canal continues east, crossing under Highway 27 and joined by the Houston River canal at pumping station #2, continuing to old Mossville. There it tees to the left, providing water to the Krause and Managan canal supplying the Nelson Industrial Steam Company (Nisco), which supplies steam and electricity to area businesses. The right tee of the canal terminates at pumping station #3 on what was 8th street in Mossville, now the Sasol complex, providing 46,080,000 gallons of river water for a total daily contract use of 141,166,000 gallons of river water a day.

== January 2010 oil spill ==
Up to 450,000 gallons (about 11,000 bls) of crude oil spilled over the Sabine River when the tanker Eagle Otome, which was carrying the shipment, struck two chemical-carrying barges due to loss of engine power on January 24, 2010, at 10 am local time.

== 2016 flooding ==
Severe flooding during the first week of March 2016 was the result of record rainfalls in northern Louisiana and the Sabine River basin, of 18 to more than 24 inches. Toledo Bend Reservoir is considered at "full pool" at 172 ft; before the rains started, it was at 171.5 ft. On March 10, the level reached a record 174.36 ft, and 9 of the 11 gates were opened to 22 ft (two gates were out of commission for repairs). Lake Tawakoni, east of Dallas on the Sabine River, was 2 feet above full pool and Lake Fork Reservoir was 1 1/2 feet above full pool.

When the reservoir level dropped to 173.69 ft, 9 gates were in operation at 20 ft. The previous record level of 173.93 ft was on May 18, 1989. At that time, the spillway gates were opened to 9 ft. The maximum height is 28 ft and with nine 9 gates open, the discharge rate is over 190,000 ft^{3} per second, which is equivalent to the flow over Niagara Falls. The peak water flow from the dam was nearly 208,000 ft^{3} per second for 31 hours, equating to 1.5 million gallons per second. Catastrophic flooding was predicted to be from 2 to 5 ft above record floods of 1884 and 1889.

=== Aftermath ===
During peak flooding, Deweyville, Texas was surrounded by water, accessible only by air or boat. The flood stage is 24 ft, but reached 33.24 ft on March 10, 2016, which was 9.24 ft above flood stage.

A group of Texas residents who suffered damage in the flooding met March 17, 2016, to discuss a class-action suit against the Sabine River Authority (SRA), based on their belief that it had mismanaged water release. The issue is under review by counsel.

According to local ABC affiliate KBMT-TV, SRA spokesperson Ann Galassi stated that the SRA has guidelines it has to follow and those cannot be altered based on weather forecasts. She said that the guidelines are designed to protect the infrastructure of the dam. After the record flood event, the regulatory commission could possibly review the guidelines, and she said that the SRA would welcome that. The SRA of Texas states, "The Authority was created as a conservation and reclamation district with responsibilities to control, store, preserve, and distribute the waters of the Sabine River and its tributary streams for useful purposes." The site also states, "Toledo Bend Project-since its inception and original development over 50 years ago-has never been a flood-control facility. Rather, the project is regulated, as set forth in the project license, to accommodate a number of public benefits, including water supply, recreation, and hydropower production."

== In literature and music ==
- Joe R. Lansdale, who grew up in East Texas, often features the river in his work.
- Gerald Duff, novelist and short story writer, has set several of his works in the territory of the Sabine, including the stories "Texas Wherever You Look", "The Way a Blind Man Tracks Light", and "Redemption". His novels Graveyard Working and Coasters are centered geographically and metaphorically along the Sabine. His novel Blue Sabine (2012) was chosen by the Texas State History Museum as a book of the month for discussion of its exploration of the Sabine river valley and its people.
- In Jack Kerouac's 1955 novel, On The Road, the book's narrator Sal Paradise and prominent character Dean Moriarty (an alias of Kerouac's friend Neal Cassady) encounter the Sabine River. It is recorded as an "evil old river", and "the mansion of the snake...we could almost hear the slither of a million copperheads." The novel is based on familiarity with the American continent, but Kerouac labels this region as "a manuscript of the night we couldn't read."
- The blues singer Alger "Texas" Alexander wrote a song called "Sabine River Blues".

== See also ==
- List of longest rivers of the United States (by main stem)
- First Battle of Sabine Pass
- Sabine-Neches Waterway
- List of rivers of Texas
- Brevelle Lake
- Sabine Independent School District
- West Sabine Independent School District
