= Taylor Landing, Texas =

- City
- Location of Taylor Landing, Texas
- Coordinates: 29°51′56″N 94°8′7″W
- Country: United States
- State: Texas
- County: Jefferson

Area
  - Total: 1.06 sq mi (2.74 km^{2})
  - Land: 1.05 sq mi (2.72 km^{2})
  - Water: 0.0077 sq mi (0.02 km^{2})
- Elevation: 7 ft (2.1 m)

Population (2020)
  - Total: 278
  - Density: 265/sq mi (102/km^{2})
- Time zone: UTC-6 (Central (CST))
  - Summer (DST): UTC-5 (CDT)
- ZIP code: 77705
- Area code: 409
- FIPS code: 48-71966
- GNIS feature ID: 2412037
- Website: taylorlanding.com

Taylor Landing is a city in Jefferson County, Texas, United States. It had a population of 278 at the 2020 census.

The city, formerly part of Port Arthur's extraterritorial jurisdiction, voted to incorporate in an election held on September 10, 2005. A total of 124 votes were cast, 80 (64.5%) in favor of incorporation and 44 (35.5%) against.

Taylor Landing is part of the Beaumont–Port Arthur metropolitan area.

Despite being formerly part of Port Arthur's extraterritorial jurisdiction, residents have a Beaumont, Texas address.

== Geography ==
Taylor Landing is located near the geographic center of Jefferson County 13 miles (21 km) west of Port Arthur in Jefferson County. Texas State Highway 73 forms the southern boundary of the city, leading east to Port Arthur and west 15 miles (24 km) to Winnie.

== City government ==
The Taylor Landing city government consists of a mayor and two commissioners. The mayor and commissioners serve two-year terms. The terms are staggered to prevent all commissioners from being replaced at one time. A sub-committee of the City Commission, the Public Works Committee, is responsible for operations of the city's public utility systems and streets. The committee consists of a public works director and four members all appointed by the City Commission. A City Clerk is appointed by the commission and is responsible for city financial and administrative activities. All elected and appointed officials serve without pay.

== Demographics ==
Historical population
Census	Pop.	Note	%±
2010	228		—
2020	278		21.9%
U.S. Decennial Census; 2020 Census

=== 2020 census ===
As of the 2020 census, Taylor Landing had a population of 278. The median age was 41.1 years. 21.9% of residents were under the age of 18 and 24.1% of residents were 65 years of age or older. For every 100 females there were 90.4 males, and for every 100 females age 18 and over there were 100.9 males age 18 and over.

0.0% of residents lived in urban areas, while 100.0% lived in rural areas.

There were 102 households in Taylor Landing, of which 33.3% had children under the age of 18 living in them. Of all households, 66.7% were married-couple households, 12.7% were households with a male householder and no spouse or partner present, and 12.7% were households with a female householder and no spouse or partner present. About 16.6% of all households were made up of individuals and 7.8% had someone living alone who was 65 years of age or older.

There were 105 housing units, of which 2.9% were vacant. The homeowner vacancy rate was 2.0% and the rental vacancy rate was 0.0%.

Racial composition as of the 2020 census
Race	Number	Percent
White	224	80.6%
Black or African American	14	5.0%
American Indian and Alaska Native	0	0.0%
Asian	4	1.4%
Native Hawaiian and Other Pacific Islander	0	0.0%
Some other race	6	2.2%
Two or more races	30	10.8%
Hispanic or Latino (of any race)	29	10.4%

== Education ==
Public education in the city of Taylor Landing is provided by the Hamshire-Fannett Independent School District.
