= Dowling, Texas =

- Unincorporated community
- Location within Texas Location within the United States
- Coordinates: 30°01′00″N 94°02′15″W
- Country: United States
- State: Texas
- County: Jefferson
- Elevation: 20 ft (6.1 m)
- Time zone: UTC-6 (Central (CST))
  - Summer (DST): UTC-5 (CDT)
- Area code: 409
- GNIS feature ID: 1378223

Dowling is an unincorporated community in Jefferson County, Texas, United States.
