= Hamshire-Fannett Independent School District =

School district in Texas, United States

Address
- 12702 Second Street Hamshire, Texas, 77622; United States

District information
- Type: Public
- Grades: PK–12
- Schools: 4
- NCES District ID: 4822320

Students and staff
- Students: 2,048 (2023–2024)
- Teachers: 136.17 (on an FTE basis) (2023–2024)
- Staff: 123.74 (on an FTE basis) (2023–2024)
- Student–teacher ratio: 15.04 (2023–2024)

Other information
- Website: www.hfisd.net

Hamshire-Fannett Independent School District is a public school district based in unincorporated Jefferson County, Texas, United States.

The district serves the city of Taylor Landing, as well as the unincorporated communities of Hamshire, Fannett, New Holland, Cheek, and some of Beaumont's extraterritorial jurisdiction (south of Beaumont city limits).

== History ==
The district was formed in 1961 by the consolidation of Hamshire-New Holland I.S.D. and Fannett I.S.D.

On February 13, 1964, the Board of Trustees approved a plan for desegregating Hamshire-Fannett ISD:

WHEREAS, the Board of Trustees and the administration have carefully studied and considered the ways and means to desegregate its schools consistent with the decision of the United States Supreme Court in Brown vs. Board of Education [347 U.S. 483, 74 S.Ct. 686, 98 L.Ed. 873, 349 U.S. 294, 75 S.Ct. 753, 99 L.Ed. 1083], which provides that various local school problems may be taken into consideration in arriving at a fair and feasible plan to bring about desegregation; and

WHEREAS, the Board of Trustees and the administration have considered these local problems; and,

WHEREAS, we believe the following plan is fair to all of the children in the District and that it is best, under all attendant circumstances which are present, for this School District:

NOW, THEREFORE, BE IT RESOLVED that the following plan of desegregation be adopted by the Board of Trustees of the Hamshire-Fannett Independent School District of Jefferson County, Texas: Those qualified to attend the schools and receive instruction in the Hamshire-Fannett Independent School District in the first grade for the school year 1964-65 shall be admitted to the school nearest their residence regardless of race or color. Thereafter, the second grade through the twelfth grade shall be desegregated in succession on a grade-a-year basis during the next eleven years following the school year 1964-65 (at which time the first grade is to be desegregated under this plan).

ADOPTED AND APPROVED this 13th day of February, 1964. Signed: Rodney Christ, President, Board of Trustees, Hamshire-Fannett Independent School District

In 2010, the school district was rated "exemplary" by the Texas Education Agency.

== Schools ==
- Hamshire-Fannett High School (Grades 9-12)
- Hamshire-Fannett Middle (Grades 6-8)
- Hamshire-Fannett Intermediate (Grades 4-5)
- Hamshire-Fannett Elementary (Grades PK-3)
