= Full summer pool =

A full summer pool or full pool is the water level of a reservoir at normal operating conditions.

== Water levels ==
During droughts or water shortages, the water level can drop below full summer pool. Additionally, water levels may be lowered during the winter season below full summer pool to accommodate snowmelt or seasonally heavy rains.

During periods of heavy rain, the water level in the reservoir may rise above full summer pool to prevent flooding downstream.

== See also ==
- Cistern
- Hydraulic engineering
