= Jefferson County, Texas =

County in Texas, United States

- County
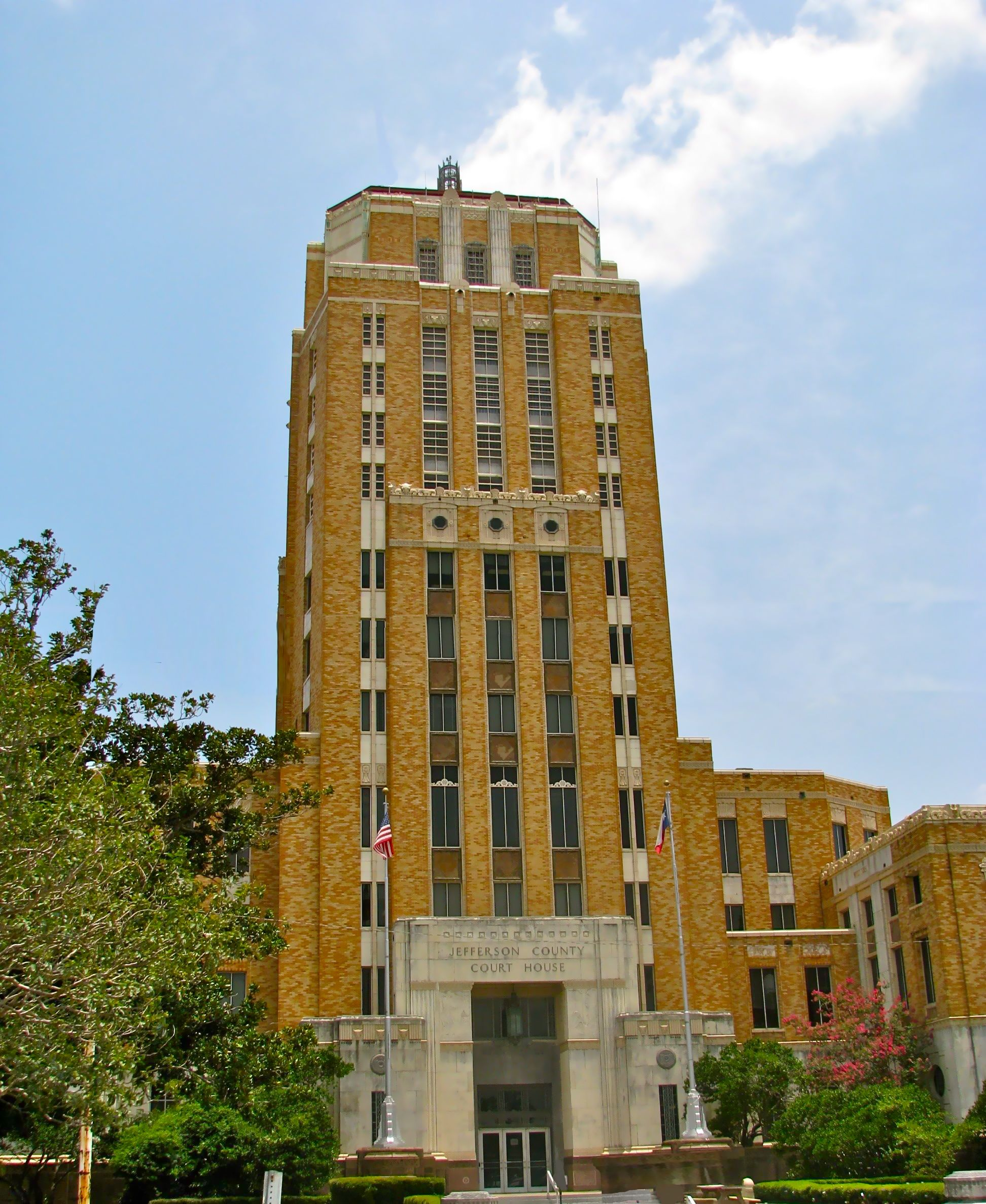
- The Jefferson County Courthouse in Beaumont. The Art Deco-style building was added to the National Register of Historic Places on June 17, 1982. The top five floors once served as the County Jail.

- Seal

- Location within the U.S. state of Texas
- Coordinates: 29°52′N 94°08′W
- Country: United States
- State: Texas
- Founded: 1837
- Named for: Thomas Jefferson
- Seat: Beaumont
- Largest city: Beaumont

Area
  - Total: 1,113 sq mi (2,880 km^{2})
  - Land: 876 sq mi (2,270 km^{2})
  - Water: 236 sq mi (610 km^{2}) 21%

Population (2020)
  - Total: 256,526
  - Estimate (2025): 254,321 ▼
  - Density: 293/sq mi (113/km^{2})
- Time zone: UTC−6 (Central)
  - Summer (DST): UTC−5 (CDT)
- Congressional districts: 14th, 36th
- Website: jeffersoncountytx.gov

Jefferson County is a county in the Coastal Plain or Gulf Prairie region of Southeast Texas. The Neches River forms its northeastern boundary. The county was named for U.S. president Thomas Jefferson. The county seat is Beaumont, which is also the largest city within the county.

The county was established in 1835 as a municipality of Mexico, which had gained independence from Spain. Because the area was lightly settled, the Mexican government allowed European Americans from the United States to settle here if they pledged loyalty to Mexico. This was organized as a county in 1837 after Texas achieved independence as a republic. Texas later became part of the US.

Jefferson County is part of the Beaumont–Port Arthur metropolitan area and has the highest population of the four-county MSA. As of the 2020 census, the population was 256,526. Jefferson County has the highest percentage of African Americans in the state of Texas.

== Geography ==
According to the U.S. Census Bureau, the county has a total area of 1,113 square miles (2,880 km^{2}), of which 876 square miles (2,270 km^{2}) is land and 236 square miles (610 km^{2}) (21%) is water.

Jefferson County is on the plains of the Texas Gulf Coast in the southeastern part of the state. It is bounded on the north by Pine Island Bayou, on the northeast by the Neches River, and on the east by Sabine Lake and the mouth of the Sabine River, a natural outlet called Sabine Pass. The southern part of the county is largely marshland, much of which is within Sea Rim State Park, reaching the storm-battered beach at the Gulf of Mexico.

=== Adjacent counties and parishes ===
- Hardin County (north)
- Orange County (northeast)
- Chambers County (southwest)
- Liberty County (northwest)
- Cameron Parish, Louisiana (east)

=== National protected areas ===
- Big Thicket National Preserve (part)
- McFaddin National Wildlife Refuge
- Texas Point National Wildlife Refuge

== Communities ==
=== Cities ===
- Beaumont (county seat and largest municipality)
- Bevil Oaks
- China
- Groves
- Nederland
- Nome
- Port Arthur (small part in Orange County)
- Port Neches
- Taylor Landing

=== Census-designated places ===
- Beauxart Gardens
- Central Gardens
- Fannett
- Hamshire

==== Unincorporated areas ====
- Cheek
- Dowling
- LaBelle
- Viterbo

== Demographics ==
Historical population
Census	Pop.	Note	%±
1850	1,836		—
1860	1,995		8.7%
1870	1,906		−4.5%
1880	3,489		83.1%
1890	5,857		67.9%
1900	14,239		143.1%
1910	38,182		168.2%
1920	73,120		91.5%
1930	133,391		82.4%
1940	145,329		8.9%
1950	195,083		34.2%
1960	245,659		25.9%
1970	244,773		−0.4%
1980	250,938		2.5%
1990	239,397		−4.6%
2000	252,051		5.3%
2010	252,273		0.1%
2020	256,526		1.7%
2025 (est.)	254,321	▼	−0.9%
U.S. Decennial Census; 1850–2010 2010–2020

=== Racial and ethnic composition ===
Jefferson County, Texas – Racial and ethnic composition Note: the US Census treats Hispanic/Latino as an ethnic category. This table excludes Latinos from the racial categories and assigns them to a separate category. Hispanics/Latinos may be of any race.
Race / Ethnicity (NH = Non-Hispanic)	Pop 1980	Pop 1990	Pop 2000	Pop 2010	Pop 2020	% 1980	% 1990	% 2000	% 2010	% 2020
White alone (NH)	166,985	147,333	130,604	112,503	96,047	66.54%	61.54%	51.82%	44.60%	37.44%
Black or African American alone (NH)	70,143	73,779	84,482	84,500	83,856	27.95%	30.82%	33.52%	33.50%	32.69%
Native American or Alaska Native alone (NH)	449	525	654	747	622	0.18%	0.22%	0.26%	0.30%	0.24%
Asian alone (NH)	2,652	4,938	7,236	8,525	9,943	1.06%	2.06%	2.87%	3.38%	3.88%
Native Hawaiian or Pacific Islander alone (NH)	x	x	68	64	66	x	x	0.03%	0.03%	0.03%
Other race alone (NH)	430	193	185	255	867	0.17%	0.08%	0.07%	0.10%	0.34%
Mixed race or Multiracial (NH)	x	x	2,286	2,780	6,210	x	x	0.91%	1.10%	2.42%
Hispanic or Latino (any race)	10,279	12,629	26,536	42,899	58,915	4.10%	5.28%	10.53%	17.00%	22.97%
Total	250,938	239,397	252,051	252,273	256,526	100.00%	100.00%	100.00%	100.00%	100.00%

=== 2020 census ===
As of the 2020 census, the county had a population of 256,526. The median age was 37.4 years. 23.7% of residents were under the age of 18 and 15.2% of residents were 65 years of age or older. For every 100 females there were 104.3 males, and for every 100 females age 18 and over there were 104.6 males age 18 and over.

The racial makeup of the county was 42.5% White, 33.1% Black or African American, 0.7% American Indian and Alaska Native, 3.9% Asian, <0.1% Native Hawaiian and Pacific Islander, 11.0% from some other race, and 8.8% from two or more races. Hispanic or Latino residents of any race comprised 23.0% of the population.

90.2% of residents lived in urban areas, while 9.8% lived in rural areas.

There were 95,658 households in the county, of which 32.9% had children under the age of 18 living in them. Of all households, 41.5% were married-couple households, 21.0% were households with a male householder and no spouse or partner present, and 31.9% were households with a female householder and no spouse or partner present. About 29.3% of all households were made up of individuals and 11.5% had someone living alone who was 65 years of age or older.

There were 108,330 housing units, of which 11.7% were vacant. Among occupied housing units, 60.7% were owner-occupied and 39.3% were renter-occupied. The homeowner vacancy rate was 1.7% and the rental vacancy rate was 12.2%.

=== 2000 census ===
As of the 2000 census, there were 252,051 people, 92,880 households, and 63,808 families residing in the county. The population density was 279 people per square mile (108 people/km^{2}). There were 102,080 housing units at an average density of 113 units per square mile (44/km^{2}). The racial makeup of the county was 57.24% White, 33.74% Black or African American, 0.34% Native American, 2.89% Asian, 0.03% Pacific Islander, 4.26% from other races, and 1.50% from two or more races. 10.53% of the population were Hispanic or Latino of any race. 8.3% were of American, 7.2% French, 6.2% German, 5.8% English and 5.3% Irish ancestry according to census 2000.

There were 92,880 households, out of which 33.00% had children under the age of 18 living with them, 48.40% were married couples living together, 16.20% had a female householder with no husband present, and 31.30% were non-families. 27.30% of all households were made up of individuals, and 11.00% had someone living alone who was 65 years of age or older. The average household size was 2.55 and the average family size was 3.12.

In the county, the population was spread out, with 25.90% under the age of 18, 10.00% from 18 to 24, 29.30% from 25 to 44, 21.10% from 45 to 64, and 13.60% who were 65 years of age or older. The median age was 35 years. For every 100 females, there were 101.10 males. For every 100 females age 18 and over, there were 100.20 males.

The median income for a household in the county was $34,706, and the median income for a family was $42,290. Males had a median income of $36,719 versus $23,924 for females. The per capita income for the county was $17,571. About 14.60% of families and 17.40% of the population were below the poverty line, including 24.60% of those under age 18 and 11.80% of those age 65 or over.

== Government and politics ==
=== County ===
The County Commissioners Court, considered the administrative arm of the state government, is made up of a county judge and four commissioners. The four commissioners are elected to staggered terms from single-member districts or precincts, two in years of presidential elections and two in off-years. The County Commissioners Court carries out the "budgetary and policy making functions of county government. In addition, in many counties, commissioners have extensive responsibilities related to the building and maintenance of county roads."

The elected county judge in Texas may also be the judge of the County Criminal Court, County Civil Court, Probate Court and Juvenile Court.

=== Commissioners' court ===
Commissioners	Name	Party	First Elected	Communities Represented
Judge	Jeff Branick	Republican	2010	Countywide
Precinct 1	Brandon Willis	Republican	2024	North Beaumont, Bevil Oaks, West Bury, China, Nome, Pine Island
Precinct 2	Cary Erickson	Republican	2022	Southwest Beaumont, Beauxart Gardens, Central Gardens, Viterbo, Fannett, LaBelle, Taylor Landing, Nederland, Port Neches, Groves
Precinct 3	Michael Sinegal	Democrat	2008	Port Arthur, Sabine Pass, Hamshire, Uninhabited and Wildlife areas
Precinct 4	Everette "Bo" Alfred	Democrat	2002	Beaumont, Cheek, Fannett

=== County officials ===
Position	Name	Party
County Clerk	Roxanne Acosta-Helberg	Republican
District Attorney	Kenneth Giblin	Democrat
District Clerk	Jamie Smith	Democrat
Sheriff	Zena Stephens	Democrat
Tax Assessor-Collector	Kate Carroll	Republican
Treasurer	Tim Funchess	Republican

=== Courts ===
==== Criminal District Courts ====
Office	Name	Party
Criminal District Court No. 1	John Stevens	Democratic
58th District Court	W. Kent Walston	Republican
252nd District Court	J. Raquel West	Republican

==== Civil District Courts ====
Office	Name	Party
60th District Court	Justin G. Sanderson	Democratic
136th District Court	Baylor Wortham	Democratic
172nd District Court	Mitch Templeton	Republican
279th District Court	Randy Shelton	Democratic
317th District Court	Gordon Friesz	Republican

=== Texas Legislature ===
==== Texas Senate ====
District	Name	Party	First Elected
3	Robert Nichols	Republican	2006
4	Brett Ligon	Republican	2026

==== Texas House of Representatives ====
District	Name	Party	First Elected
21	Dade Phelan	Republican	2014
22	Christian Manuel	Democratic	2022

=== United States Congress ===
Senators	Name	Party	First Elected	Level
Senate Class 1	Ted Cruz	Republican	2012	Junior Senator
Senate Class 2	John Cornyn	Republican	2002	Senior senator
Representatives	Name	Party	First Elected	
District 14	Randy Weber	Republican	2012	
District 36	Brian Babin	Republican	2014	

=== Presidential elections ===
Membership in political parties in Texas has undergone realignment since the late 20th century, following passage of the Voting Rights Act of 1965 and renewed participation by minorities in the political system. Jefferson County had been dominated by Democratic voters in presidential elections: prior to 1965 they were majority white and the party has since attracted many minorities. In many parts of Texas, Republican voters have predominated in presidential elections, especially since the turn of the 21st century.

In 2004, Jefferson was one of only 18 counties in Texas that gave Senator John Kerry a majority of the popular vote. Kerry received 47,050 votes while George W. Bush received 44,412. In 2008, Barack Obama won 51.25% of the vote. John McCain won 48.38% of the vote. Other candidates received 1% of the vote. The Democratic trend continued in 2012 when Barack Obama won Jefferson County with 50.34% of the vote, while 48.73% went to Mitt Romney.

In 2016, Donald Trump won the county by a very narrow margin over Hillary Clinton, becoming the first Republican presidential candidate to win in Jefferson County since Richard Nixon in 1972. Trump carried the county again in 2020, this time with a slight majority, as well as in 2024 with an increased majority.

United States presidential election results for Jefferson County, Texas
Year	Republican		Democratic		Third party(ies)	
Year	No.	%	No.	%	No.	%
1912	187	7.81%	1,703	71.17%	503	21.02%
1916	488	12.99%	3,082	82.06%	186	4.95%
1920	1,110	17.21%	4,246	65.83%	1,094	16.96%
1924	4,348	40.42%	5,925	55.09%	483	4.49%
1928	9,209	56.74%	7,006	43.16%	16	0.10%
1932	3,584	17.18%	17,129	82.09%	152	0.73%
1936	2,544	12.23%	18,187	87.40%	77	0.37%
1940	4,860	19.76%	19,694	80.09%	37	0.15%
1944	4,525	15.56%	22,066	75.88%	2,489	8.56%
1948	5,749	17.15%	22,475	67.06%	5,290	15.78%
1952	25,363	46.29%	29,384	53.63%	48	0.09%
1956	30,102	54.31%	25,057	45.21%	270	0.49%
1960	29,395	41.80%	40,533	57.63%	403	0.57%
1964	28,771	39.09%	44,584	60.58%	239	0.32%
1968	26,007	33.40%	30,032	38.57%	21,829	28.03%
1972	45,819	60.42%	29,909	39.44%	109	0.14%
1976	32,451	40.29%	47,581	59.07%	514	0.64%
1980	36,763	43.45%	45,642	53.95%	2,197	2.60%
1984	45,124	45.03%	54,846	54.73%	245	0.24%
1988	35,754	38.99%	55,649	60.69%	290	0.32%
1992	29,622	31.00%	48,405	50.66%	17,516	18.33%
1996	32,821	38.88%	45,854	54.31%	5,751	6.81%
2000	40,320	46.39%	45,409	52.25%	1,180	1.36%
2004	44,423	48.36%	47,066	51.23%	377	0.41%
2008	42,905	48.52%	44,888	50.76%	637	0.72%
2012	43,242	48.73%	44,668	50.34%	825	0.93%
2016	42,862	48.92%	42,443	48.44%	2,313	2.64%
2020	47,570	50.20%	46,073	48.62%	1,116	1.18%
2024	46,596	53.98%	38,936	45.11%	782	0.91%

United States Senate election results for Jefferson County, Texas1
Year	Republican		Democratic		Third party(ies)	
Year	No.	%	No.	%	No.	%
2024	43,888	51.66%	39,643	46.66%	1,425	1.68%

United States Senate election results for Jefferson County, Texas2
Year	Republican		Democratic		Third party(ies)	
Year	No.	%	No.	%	No.	%
2020	46,928	50.50%	44,112	47.47%	1,886	2.03%
2026	30,937	42.50%	40,543	55.69%	1,321	1.81%

Texas Gubernatorial election results for Jefferson County
Year	Republican		Democratic		Third party(ies)	
Year	No.	%	No.	%	No.	%
2022	34,988	56.02%	26,641	42.66%	822	1.32%
2026	32,737	44.73%	39,380	53.81%	1,064	1.45%

== Criminal justice ==
The county has three state correctional facilities and a federal high-security prison in unincorporated areas of the county. Together they have a maximum capacity of nearly 9,000 prisoners.

The Texas Department of Criminal Justice operates three facilities in the county: the Gist Unit, a state jail; the Stiles Unit, a prison; and the Leblanc Unit, a pre-release facility, in an unincorporated area of Jefferson County.

In addition, the Texas Youth Commission operated the Al Price State Juvenile Correctional Facility in an unincorporated area within the Mid County region. The facility was among three selected for closure on August 31, 2011, because of agency budget shortfalls. In 2015 the county commissioners announced that it would lease the facility to a Beaumont charter school, Evolution Academy, at a minimal cost for 35 years. This was reported as an attempt to prevent the state from housing sex offenders here who had completed their sentences.

The Federal Bureau of Prisons operates the Beaumont Federal Correctional Complex in an unincorporated area in Jefferson County. It is a high-security prison with a capacity of nearly 1400 inmates.

== Economy ==
The area is served by deep-water ports located at Beaumont, Port Arthur, Orange, and Sabine Pass. The Sabine Neches Waterway provides deep-water access to ocean-going vessels, which are served by public ports within the county. The waterway is the 8th largest port in the U.S. by tonnage.

The county's economy is primarily based on petroleum refining; the production and processing of petrochemicals, bio-fuels and other chemicals; the fabrication of steel and steel products; shipping activity; the manufacture of wood, pulp, food and feed products; agriculture; and health care services. The county continues to diversify its economic base as evidenced by the increase of jobs in the services and government sectors. The county is also home to the largest military off-load port in the world.

=== Future projects and expansions ===
Several large projects are in construction, permitting, and development for the area and the county continues to work with other taxing entities to create a business environment conducive to this growth. These include such notables as Lucite, Air Products, Vitol, Golden Pass Products, OCI, Exxon Mobil, Golden Pass LNG, and Sempra Energy.

Petrochemical expansions at the Motiva, Total, and Valero facilities located in Jefferson County represent approximately $15 billion in project improvements. In addition, hundreds of millions of dollars are being spent on terminal and pipeline facilities to support these projects. Construction of the Trans-Canada Keystone XL pipeline which would deliver Canadian tar sands crude to Jefferson County and proponents say would help in relieving U.S. dependence on oil from more politically volatile regions is awaiting federal permit approval. In addition, recent rail terminal facility expansions and new construction has significantly increased the transportation of Canadian tar sands oil and bitumen to the area for processing by area refineries.

Cheniere, one of two companies with liquefied natural gas terminals on the border of the Texas/Louisiana Coast, is completing construction of a $10 billion liquefaction facility. Golden Pass LNG opened their terminal in mid-2011. With their opening, the ship channel is now home to over 40% of the nation's LNG capacity. Golden Pass LNG has filed with federal authorities for permits allowing it to build a $10 billion gas liquefaction facility in Jefferson County, as has Sempra Energy. It is anticipated that these permits should move through the approval process more expeditiously now that former Texas governor Rick Perry has been confirmed as the new Secretary of Energy.

The county has participated in a study by the U.S. Army Corps of Engineers into the feasibility of deepening the Sabine-Neches waterway. This will allow ports in Southeast Texas, the third largest in the nation, to accommodate newer deep draft vessels and thus remain competitive with other ports on the Gulf Coast. Recently, the U.S. Army Corps of Engineers issued their "Chief's Report" which paves the way for federal funding of this project. The U.S. House and Senate recently passed legislation which was signed by the President authorizing the construction of the waterway improvements at a cost in excess of $1 billion. Congressional appropriations for the project are expected shortly.

The county continues to work with industry leaders, the Texas Workforce Commission, Lamar Institute of Technology, Lamar University and non-profit groups to supply a workforce able to handle the growing labor needs of the county. This is especially critical given the interest of the international community in locating facilities to the county.

The resurgence in U.S. oil and gas exploration and production has made the county the place of choice for those industrial sectors seeking to exploit opportunities to profit from historically low priced energy commodities.

== Education ==
School districts:

- Beaumont Independent School District
- Hamshire-Fannett Independent School District
- Hardin-Jefferson Independent School District
- Nederland Independent School District
- Port Arthur Independent School District
- Port Neches–Groves Independent School District
- Sabine Pass Independent School District

Hamshire-Fannett and Sabine Pass ISDs are assigned to Galveston College in Galveston. Legislation does not specify a community college for the remainder of the county.

Beaumont is home to Lamar University, a public research university with an enrollment of 14,889 students as of the fall 2014 semester; it offers 96 undergraduate, 50 master's, and eight doctoral degree programs. Port Arthur is home to Lamar State College–Port Arthur, offering two-year degrees and one-year certifications, including 34 associate degrees and 24 technical programs. Fall 2014 enrollment totaled 2,075 students.

== Transportation ==
=== Major highways ===
- Interstate 10
- U.S. Highway 69/U.S. Highway 96/U.S. Highway 287
- U.S. Highway 90
- State Highway 73
- State Highway 82
- State Highway 87
- State Highway 105
- State Highway 124
- State Highway 326
- State Highway 347
- Spur 93
- Spur 136
- Spur 215
- Spur 380

=== Major Farm to Market Roads ===
- Farm to Market Road 364
- Farm to Market Road 365
- Farm to Market Road 366

=== Airports ===
The Jack Brooks Regional Airport (BPT), located between Beaumont and Port Arthur provides passenger and freight service with regional jet flights nonstop to Dallas/Fort Worth Airport (DFW), Texas with this scheduled passenger service being operated by American Eagle on behalf of American Airlines.

The Beaumont Municipal Airport (BMT) near the western city limit is available for general aviation travel.

=== Rail ===
Amtrak's Sunset Limited train serves the Beaumont train station.

Rail and motor freight carriers also provide freight service to the county.

=== Bus ===
Greyhound bus provides travel stations in Beaumont and Port Arthur.

Both Beaumont and Port Arthur operate their own citywide bus systems. Beaumont operates the Beaumont Municipal Transit System (BMT), and Port Arthur operates the Port Arthur Transit (PAT).

== See also ==
- National Register of Historic Places listings in Jefferson County, Texas
- Recorded Texas Historic Landmarks in Jefferson County
