= Dowling Park, Florida =

- Unincorporated community
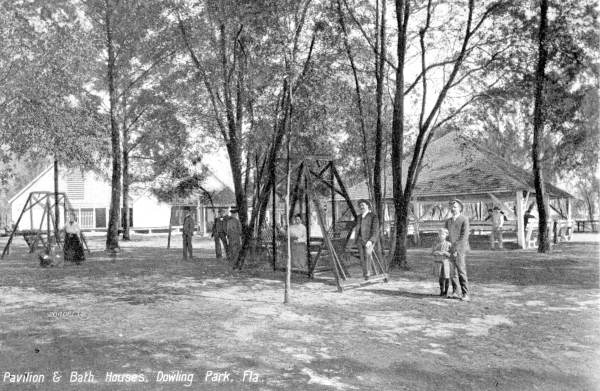
- Pavilion and bathhouses at Dowling Park, 1910s

- Location within Florida
- Coordinates: 30°15′N 83°14′W
- Country: United States
- State: Florida
- County: Suwannee
- Elevation: 62 ft (19 m)
- Time zone: UTC-5 (Eastern (EST))
  - Summer (DST): UTC-4 (EDT)
- Area code: 386
- GNIS feature ID: 281738

Dowling Park is an unincorporated community located in Suwannee County, Florida, United States. The United States Census Bureau reports on Dowling Park as a Census County Division (CCD) covering 174.9 square miles (453 km^{2}).
