= Dowling, South Dakota =

Coordinates: 44°20′01″N 101°59′05″W

Dowling is a ghost town in Haakon County, in the U.S. state of South Dakota.

Dowling was laid out in 1907.
