= Sabine Lake =

Estuary on the Texas–Louisiana border

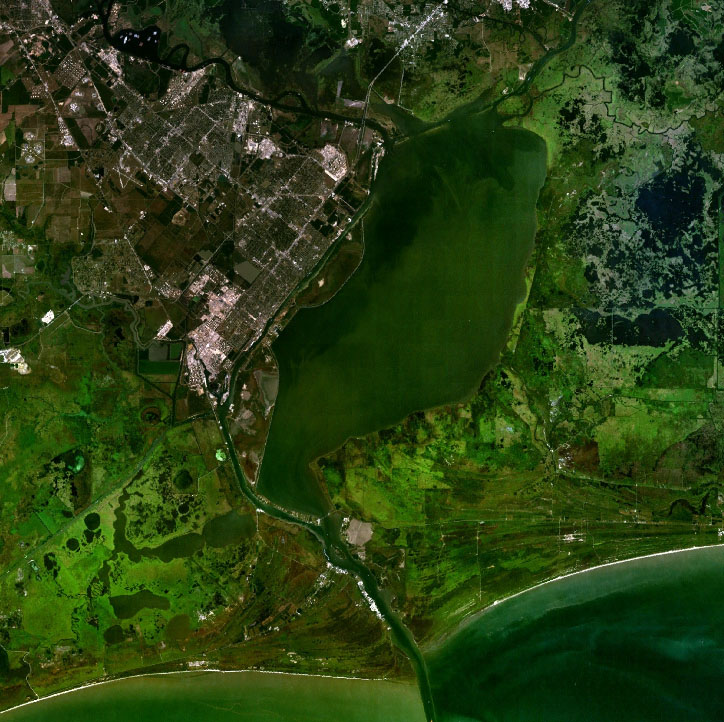
- Satellite image of Sabine Lake, with a portion of Port Arthur visible in the upper left

- Location within Louisiana Location within Texas Location within the United States
- Location: Texas/Louisiana Gulf Coast
- Coordinates: 29°52′30″N 93°50′51″W
- Primary inflows: Neches River, Sabine River
- Ocean/sea sources: Gulf of Mexico
- Basin countries: United States
- Max. length: 14 mi (23 km)
- Max. width: 7 mi (11 km)
- Surface area: 45,320 acres (18,340 ha)
- Average depth: 10 ft (3 m)
- Max. depth: 40 ft (12 m)
- Surface elevation: 0 ft (0 m)
- Islands: Pleasure Island
- Settlements: Port Arthur, Texas

Sabine Lake is a bay on the Gulf coasts of Texas and Louisiana, located approximately 90 miles (140 km) east of Houston and 160 miles (260 km) west of Baton Rouge, adjoining the city of Port Arthur. The lake is formed by the confluence of the Neches and Sabine Rivers and connects to the Gulf of Mexico through Sabine Pass. It forms part of the Texas–Louisiana border, falling within Jefferson and Orange Counties in Texas and Cameron Parish, Louisiana.

Sabine Lake is one of seven major estuaries along the Gulf Coast of Texas. Much of the Louisiana shore is protected by the Sabine National Wildlife Refuge. There is a long history of human habitation around the lake, including Native American settlement dating back at least 1,500 years, European exploration in the eighteenth century, and the growth of Port Arthur in the twentieth century. Today the lake serves as part of the Sabine–Neches Waterway and the Gulf Intracoastal Waterway and is a center for the shipping and petrochemical industries.

== History ==
Archaeological evidence indicates that Native American groups from the Marksville culture were present near the shores of Sabine Lake by 500 CE. Burial mounds that may have belonged to the Karankawa have been uncovered near the north shore at what is now Port Neches, but by the time of European arrival in the eighteenth century the region was inhabited by the Atakapa. English explorers led by George Gauld mapped the lake in 1777; Spanish explorers under Antonio Gil Y'Barbo visited the lake the same year, and an expedition under José Antonio de Evia mapped the lake in 1785 as part of a survey of the Texas coast. In the early 1800s Sabine Lake was used to ship slaves and other contraband into the region by smugglers including the pirate Jean Lafitte. The waterway was also used to move timber and cotton out from the interior.

With the 1801 Treaty of Aranjuez the lake became part of the border between French Louisiana and Spanish Texas. After the Louisiana Purchase Sabine Lake formed part of the United States' border with Spanish Texas, then Mexican Texas, and finally the Republic of Texas. During the Republic period the American and Texan customs agencies came into significant conflict over the taxation of shipping on the lake, but with the Texas annexation Sabine Lake instead became part of the border between the U.S. states of Louisiana and Texas. The lake's shores were only intermittently settled and abandoned in the mid-to-late 1800s, and the 1886 Indianola hurricane destroyed the only significant settlements nearby at Sabine Pass and Johnson Bayou.

The inlet at Sabine Pass was dredged and deepened in 1880 to ease access to the lake for shipping. In 1895 Port Arthur was founded, and the southwestern edge of the lake was channelized from Sabine Pass to Port Arthur in 1899, forming the Port Arthur Canal. The discovery of petroleum under Spindletop in 1901 began the Texas oil boom and caused rapid economic growth in nearby Beaumont, prompting interest in expanding the region's canal system. By 1908 Sabine Lake's channel was extended northward to the mouths of the Neches and Sabine Rivers to improve shipping access to the ports of Beaumont and Orange, forming the Sabine–Neches Canal; the region's combined channel system is known as the Sabine–Neches Waterway. The material dredged up in the canalization was formed into Pleasure Island, an artificial barrier island along the majority of the western shore that shelters Port Arthur and the waterway. Most of the Louisiana shore was protected within the Sabine National Wildlife Refuge in 1937. In the early twentieth century the lake and its shipping channel were incorporated into a wider network of canals running from New Orleans to Galveston Bay; after World War II this network grew into the Gulf Intracoastal Waterway.

== Features ==
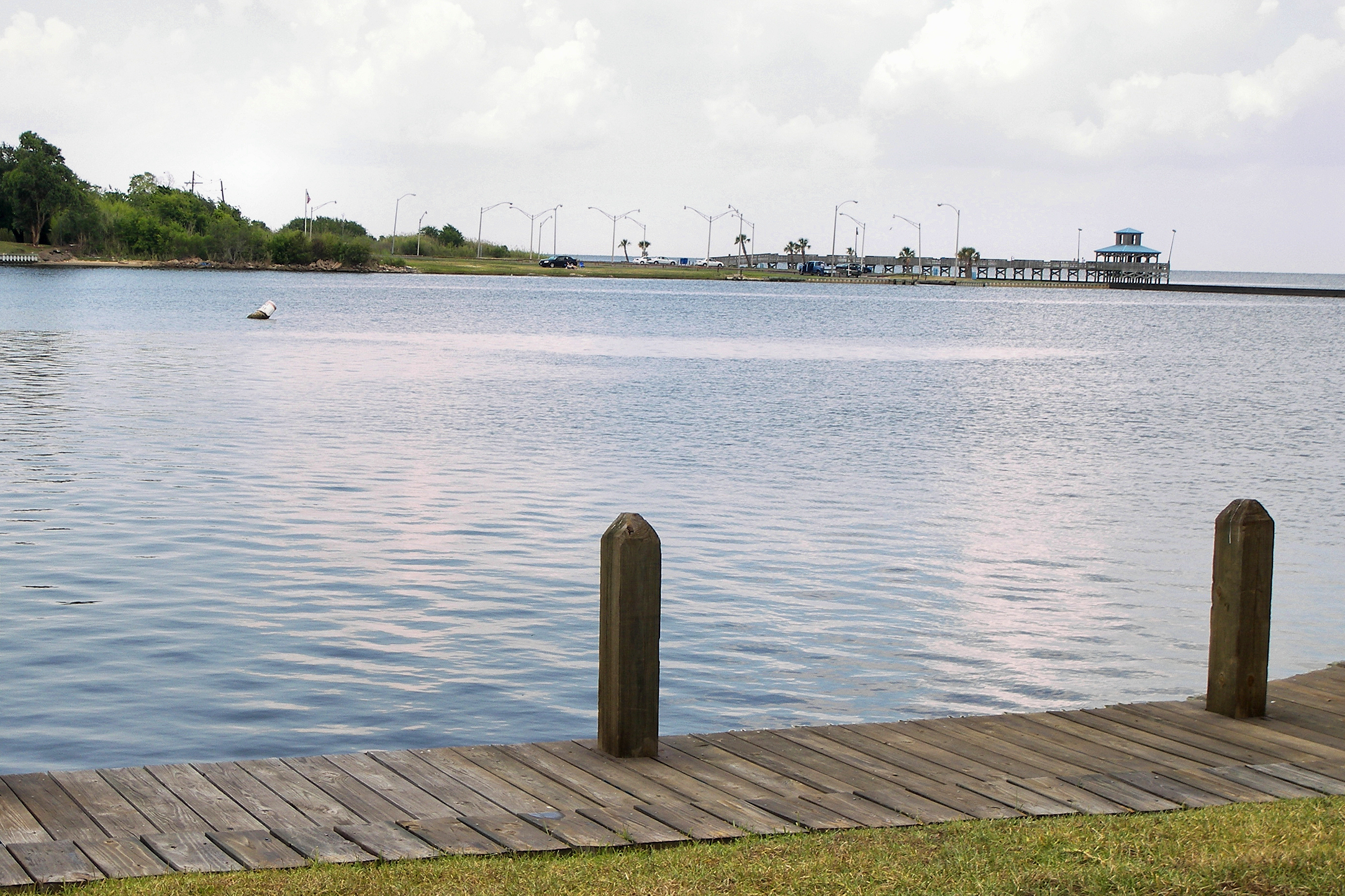
Sabine Lake viewed from Pleasure Island in Port Arthur

Sabine Lake is located on the Gulf Coastal Plain at the Texas–Louisiana border. The natural portions of the lake have a mean low-water depth of at most around 10 feet (3 m), though the ship channels have been dredged to a depth of more than 40 feet (12 m). The eastern (Louisiana) shore has little human development, and the majority is protected within the Sabine National Wildlife Refuge; the western (Texas) shore is heavily urbanized, with the city of Port Arthur and significant shipping and petrochemical infrastructure along the shore. Pleasure Island parallels the western shore for 18 miles (29 km), separating the Port Arthur Canal and Sabine–Neches Canal from the main body of the lake. The Martin Luther King Bridge (also known as the Gulfgate Bridge) spans the Sabine–Neches Canal to link Port Arthur to Pleasure Island, and the Sabine Causeway connects the island to the Louisiana shore across the southern tip of the lake. Water exchange with the Gulf of Mexico occurs at Sabine Pass.

Sabine Lake is the smallest of the seven major estuaries along the Gulf Coast of Texas, approximately 14 miles (23 km) long and 7 miles (11 km) wide, with a surface area of 45,320 acres (18,340 ha). It receives the discharge from the Neches and Sabine Rivers, along with various smaller streams and the surrounding coastal watershed. The lake's small size and high rate of freshwater inflow make it the least saline of the major Texas estuaries. Its salinity was even lower prior to the twentieth century, and its upper reaches were almost entirely fresh, but the extensive channelization of the lake since then has led to increased saltwater intrusion into the estuary, with salinity rising especially during periods of low freshwater inflow. Increasing salinity has had a negative impact on the diversity and productivity of wetland plants in the estuary.

== Ecosystem ==
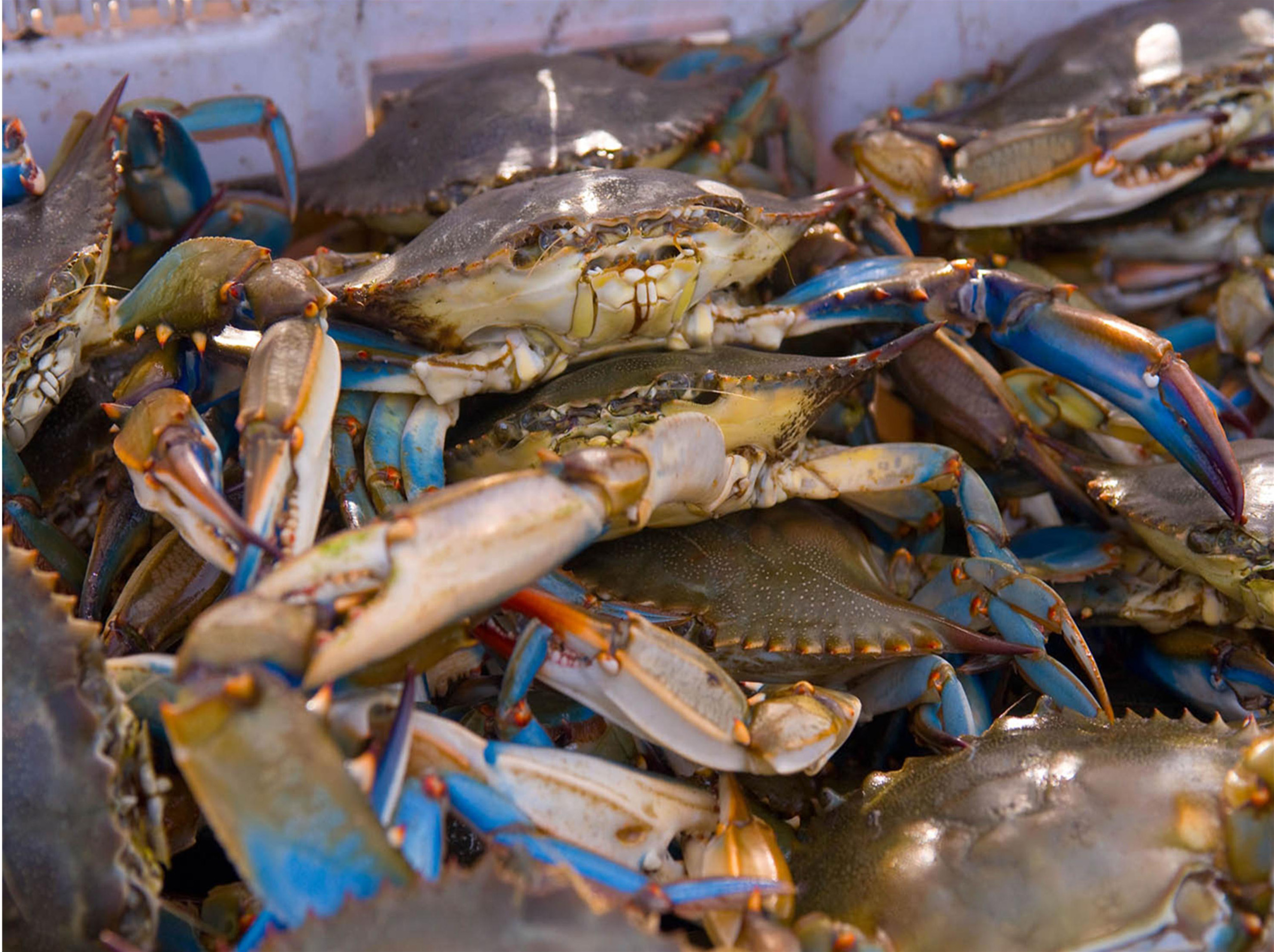
Catch of blue crab, the most commercially important fishery species in Sabine Lake

The dominant species of aquatic vegetation in Sabine Lake is Ruppia maritima. Aquatic fauna include a variety of finfish and shellfish, with large populations of sport fishing species such as Atlantic croaker, spotted seatrout, southern flounder, red and black drum, sheepshead and gafftopsail catfish. Other significant fish species include the bay anchovy, Gulf menhaden and spot. Commercial fishing in the lake produces mainly shellfish, especially blue crab and penaeid shrimp such as northern brown shrimp and Atlantic white shrimp. Sabine Lake is the only major Texas estuary that does not support a commercial American oyster fishery, as it lacks a suitable reef and is too polluted for legal oyster harvesting.

The land around the lake includes a blend of Western Gulf coastal grasslands and coastal marsh ecosystems, together with urban land cover in Port Arthur and its suburbs on the western shore. The majority of the non-urbanized shoreline is surrounded by brackish marshes, with halophytes such as cordgrasses and common reeds as the dominant flora. These coastal wetlands provide habitats for American alligators, Atlantic ridley sea turtles, red wolves and brown pelicans. Saltwater intrusion and land subsidence resulting from human activities in the lake since the late 1800s have caused vegetation loss and erosion, and the remaining marshes are experiencing ongoing degradation as the ecosystems adjust to the altered hydrology in the estuary.

== Industry ==
Petrochemical industry along the Texas shore of Sabine Lake

The channelization of Sabine Lake has made it an important industrial waterway, one component of the Gulf Intracoastal Waterway and the heart of the Sabine–Neches Waterway. The three ports it links to the Gulf of Mexico (Port Arthur, Beaumont and Orange) form a major nexus for the shipping and petrochemical industries, the so-called Golden Triangle of Texas. The largest industries around the lake are petroleum and natural gas extraction, petrochemical processing, shipping, and shipbuilding. Agriculture also forms a significant component of the regional economy, principally rice and soybean cultivation, livestock ranching, and commercial fishing.
