= Dowling v. United States =

Dowling v. United States may refer to the following opinions of the Supreme Court of the United States:

- Dowling v. United States (1985), 473 U.S. 207, a case clarifying that copies of copyrighted works are not "stolen goods" under the National Stolen Property Act of 1934.
- Dowling v. United States (1990), 493 U.S. 342, a case regarding the Double Jeopardy Clause concerning the later admissibility of evidence from an earlier trial in which the defendant was acquitted.
