= Harry Brinkley Bass =

Recipient of the Navy Cross

- Born: July 4, 1916; Chicago, Illinois, U.S.
- Died: August 20, 1944 (aged 28); Saint Bonnet le Froid, France
- Military career
- Allegiance: United States of America
- Branch: United States Navy
- Service years: 1938–1944
- Rank: Lieutenant Commander
- Nickname: "Brink"
- Commands: VF-29, VF-74
- Conflicts: World War II; *Battle of the Coral Sea; *Invasion of southern France
- Awards: Navy Cross (2); Silver Star; Distinguished Flying Cross; Purple Heart; Air Medal

Harry Brinkley "Brink" Bass (July 4, 1916 – August 20, 1944) was a U.S. Navy pilot who was twice awarded the Navy Cross for his heroic actions in the Pacific theater during World War II. Bass died over Saint Bonnet le Froid, in southern France when his plane was shot down by anti-aircraft fire. USS Brinkley Bass (DD-887) was named in his honor.

== Personal information ==
Bass was born in Chicago, Illinois, but the family later moved to Beaumont, Texas. He was raised a Presbyterian. He attended Averill Elementary School and Beaumont High School, graduating on June 2, 1932. He served on the Student Council, Faculty Advisory Council, high school paper, and yearbook. He first attended South Park College, now Lamar University, for one year and then the West Point-Annapolis Coaching School, in Columbia, Missouri, for the 1933–1934 school year. He then entered the United States Naval Academy in Annapolis, Maryland, on June 11, 1934, having secured an appointment through his guardian uncle's Arkansas representative since the Texas appointments were taken. Earning several awards while there, he graduated on June 2, 1938, and was commissioned as an ensign in the Navy. He never married.

Bass became an Eagle Scout on August 14, 1930 in Beaumont's Troop 6 under Scoutmaster Harry P. Jirou. He attended the 3rd World Scout Jamboree in Birkenhead, England, as the youngest of the 13 Scouts making the trip from Beaumont. He also visited Paris and New York City during this trip. Bass received some notoriety for remarks he made that appeared in the Saturday Evening Post about the Prince of Wales, later Edward VIII, wearing a "sloppy" Scout uniform. The Clifton Steamboat Museum in Beaumont, Texas has a large gallery celebrating his life and accomplishments.

== Military service ==
Following graduation from the Naval Academy and commissioning as an ensign, Bass was first assigned to the cruiser USS New Orleans (CA-32) from 1938 to 1939. He then served on the destroyer USS Farragut (DD-348) from 1939 to 1940. He was then assigned to flight training and designated a naval aviator on February 18, 1941, and assigned to bombing squadron VB-2 on board the USS Lexington, flying an SBD Dauntless. He was soon fighting in World War II in the Pacific. His first air-to-air combat action occurred on February 20, 1942, when the Lexington was engaged by two groups of Japanese planes. One of the battles he took part in was the Battle of the Coral Sea. He was awarded both of his Navy Crosses during his time on board the Lexington — one for sinking an enemy ship and one for helping sink a carrier. Bass survived the later sinking of the Lexington.

In July 1942 Bass was reassigned as a fighter pilot and was assigned to VF-29, of which he eventually became commander, on board USS Santee. The Santee was in the Atlantic Ocean when Bass arrived, but eventually was sent to the Pacific theater of operations. He transferred from the Santee and VF-29 in April 1944. Bass was awarded his Silver Star and Air Medal during his time on board the USS Santee. He then transferred to USS Kasaan Bay as commander of VF-74. During this time he participated in the operations in North Africa. Bass died when his F6F Hellcat fighter plane was shot down by German anti-aircraft fire over Southern France on August 20, 1944, near Vanosc, France. Bass was awarded the Distinguished Flying Cross and Purple Heart posthumously. He was initially buried by French civilians in a church cemetery at St. Bonnet Le Froid, France, but in September 1948 his remains were moved to Roselawn Memorial Park, located in Little Rock, Arkansas.

The USS Brinkley Bass (DD-887) was named in his honor. This ship was laid down on December 20, 1944, at Orange, Texas, by the Consolidated Steel Corporation; launched on May 26, 1945; sponsored by Mrs. Verna Maulding Bass (his mother); and commissioned on October 1, 1945, with Cmdr. Philip W. Winston in command.

Memorials erected in honor of Bass include those in Les Villettes, France and at the Dishman Scout Service Center in Beaumont, Texas.

== Decorations ==
- Navy Cross with Gold Star
- Silver Star
- Distinguished Flying Cross
- Purple Heart
- Air Medal

== Navy Cross citations ==
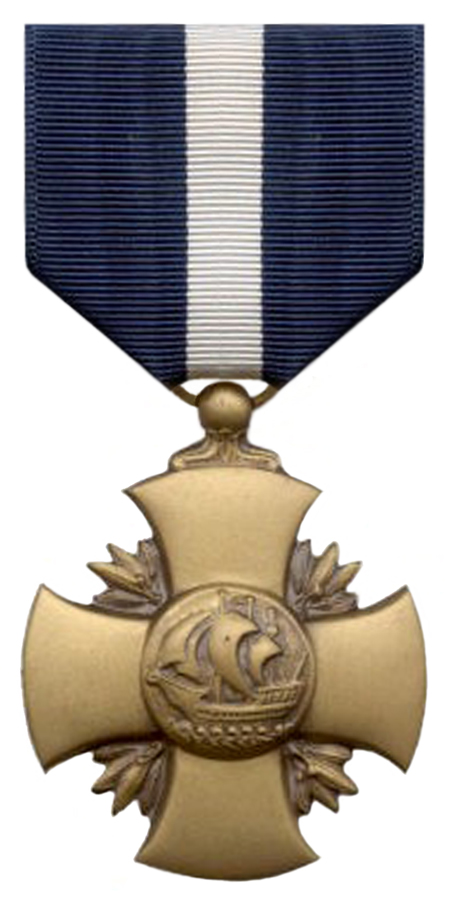
Navy Cross

=== First award, March 10, 1942 ===
The Navy Cross is presented to Harry Brinkley Bass, Lieutenant (j.g.), U.S. Navy, for distinguished service in the line of his profession as a pilot of a Scouting Squadron, when, on March 10, 1942, in enemy waters, he pressed home, in the face of heavy anti-aircraft fire, a vigorous and determined dive bombing attack on enemy ships, sinking one of them. His outstanding courage and determined skill were at all times inspiring and in keeping with the highest traditions of the United States Naval Service.

=== Second award, May 7, 1942 ===
The Navy Cross is presented to Harry Brinkley Bass, Lieutenant (j.g.), U.S. Navy, for extraordinary heroism and conspicuous devotion to duty as pilot of a dive bomber in action against Japanese forces in the Coral Sea on May 7, 1942. In the face of heavy anti-aircraft fire and fierce fighter opposition, he dived his plane at an enemy Japanese aircraft carrier and released his bomb with calm and accuracy. By grim determination and expert appraisal of his objective, he contributed materially to the high percentage of hits inflicted by his particular squadron and assisted in ultimate destruction of the enemy carrier. His individual action was an important factor in the collective success of those United States Naval forces which engaged in the enemy in the Battle of the Coral Sea.

== See also ==
- List of notable Eagle Scouts
