= USS Brinkley Bass =

Gearing-class destroyer

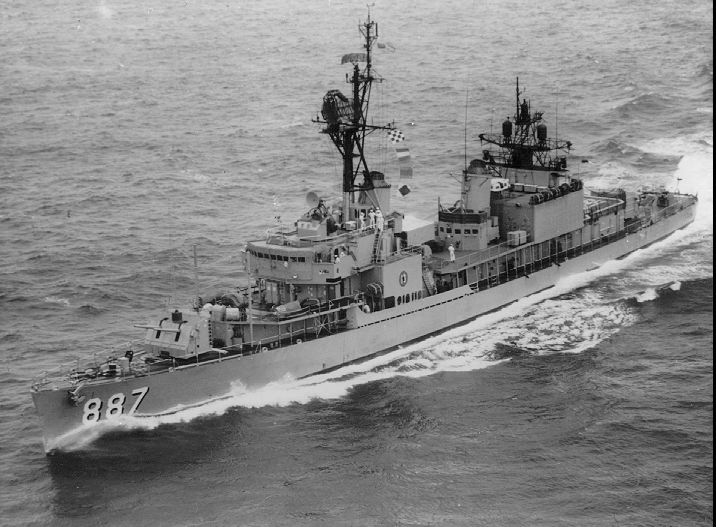
- USS Brinkley Bass underway in June 1968

History

United States
- Name: USS Brinkley Bass
- Namesake: Harry Brinkley Bass
- Builder: Consolidated Steel Corporation at Orange, Texas
- Laid down: 20 December 1944
- Launched: 26 May 1945
- Commissioned: 1 October 1945
- Decommissioned: 3 December 1973
- Identification: Callsign: NDJF; Hull number: DD-887
- Fate: Transferred to Brazil on 3 December 1973

Brazil
- Name: Mariz e Barros
- Namesake: Antônio Carlos de Mariz e Barros
- Acquired: 3 December 1973
- Commissioned: December 1973
- Decommissioned: 1 September 1997
- Identification: D 26
- Fate: Sunk as a target December 2000.

General characteristics
- Class & type: Gearing-class destroyer
- Displacement: 2,425 tons
- Length: 390 ft 6 in (119.02 m)
- Beam: 40 ft 10 in (12.45 m)
- Draft: 18 ft 6 in (5.64 m)
- Speed: 34.6 knots (64.1 km/h; 39.8 mph)
- Complement: 345
- Armament: 6 x 5 in (130 mm) (127 mm/38) guns; 16 x 40 mm AA guns; 10 x 21 inch (533 mm) torpedo tubes; 6 x depth charge projectors; 1 Hedgehog depth charge projector; 2 x depth charge tracks

USS Brinkley Bass (DD-887) was a Gearing-class destroyer in service with the United States Navy from 1945 to 1973. She was then transferred to Brazil where she served as Mariz e Barros (D-26) until 1997. The destroyer was finally sunk as a target in 2000.

== Construction ==
Brinkley Bass was named for Lieutenant Commander Harry Brinkley Bass (1916–1944), who was killed in action when his plane crashed in combat during the invasion of southern France on 20 August 1944. The destroyer was laid down by the Consolidated Steel Corporation at Orange, Texas on 20 December 1944, launched on 26 May 1945 by Mrs. Percy Bass, mother of Lt. Cmdr. Bass and commissioned on 1 October 1945.

== History ==
=== United States Navy service ===
USS Brinkley Bass (DD-887) was laid down on 20 December 1944 at Orange, Texas, by the Consolidated Steel Corporation and launched on 26 May 1945 sponsored by Mrs. Verna Maulding Bass. The destroyer was commissioned on 1 October 1945.

The destroyer spent the remainder of 1945 outfitting and conducting shakedown training in the Gulf of Mexico. She then put into Charleston, South Carolina, for post-shakedown availability. On 2 February 1946, the warship stood out of Charleston on her way to the U.S. West Coast. After transiting the Panama Canal, Brinkley Bass arrived in San Diego on 20 February. She remained at San Diego less than a week. On the 26th, the destroyer was underway bound for the western Pacific Ocean. Early that spring the destroyer arrived in Shanghai, China, and began duty transporting mail between the various naval commands in China. She made the rounds between Shanghai, Tsingtao, and Hong Kong, and conducted maneuvers with Task Forces (TF) 58 and 77. In December, the destroyer began the voyage home, stopping at Guam and at Pearl Harbor before arriving back in San Diego in February 1947.

For the next year, Brinkley Bass participated in type training and independent ship's exercises along the coast of southern California. During the summer of 1947, she entered Hunters Point Naval Shipyard for regular overhaul. The repair period lasted until November, at which time the destroyer resumed local operations. In February 1948, she headed back to the Far East for a deployment of about eight months. During that cruise, she visited Tsingtao, China; as well as the Japanese port cities of Fukuoka, Osaka, Sasebo, Yokohama, and Yokosuka. The warship returned to San Diego in October and resumed local operations out of her home port. In February 1949, she departed the waters of southern California to participate in Operation "Micowex" conducted in Alaskan waters. Brinkley Bass reentered San Diego in March, and April saw her begin another regular overhaul, that time at the Mare Island Naval Shipyard.

In July, the warship resumed operations along the coast of southern California. In October, Brinkley Bass embarked upon her third tour of duty in the Orient. During that deployment, she alternated port visits in Japan, China, Okinawa, and the Philippines with training evolutions and patrols in Tsushima Strait. Returning via Guam and Pearl Harbor, the destroyer arrived back home in June 1950.

==== Korean War ====
On 25 June 1950, the Korean War broke out. Brinkley Bass, however, did not get into the conflict immediately. Scheduled for regular overhaul, she entered the Hunters Point Naval Shipyard on 16 August and remained there until 8 October. After about a month of normal operations, the destroyer departed San Diego on 6 November, bound for her first tour of duty in the Korean combat zone. She made the normal stops, Pearl Harbor, Midway Island, and Sasebo, Japan before joining Task Force 77 off the Korean coast on 25 November. Brinkley Bass served the carriers of TF 77 as plane guard and anti-submarine escort.

Such remained her mission until late in April 1951 when she and her division mates were detached to escort a convoy of transports to Japanese ports. On 16 May, she reported for duty with TF 95, the "Blockading and Escort Force", for duty off Wonsan harbour. For the next 30 days, the warship shelled enemy installations continually and vectored in air strikes on other targets. On 20 May, a North Korean shore battery succeeded in wounding 10 Brinkley Bass crewmembers, one of them fatally, with shell fragments from a near-miss to starboard. On 27 June, she resumed duty as plane guard and escort to the carriers of TF 77. She and her division were relieved by Destroyer Division (DesDiv) 91 on 18 July, and they headed home via Yokosuka and Pearl Harbor. Brinkley Bass reentered San Diego on 6 August. After a post-deployment leave and upkeep period, the destroyer resumed normal operations out of San Diego.

That employment lasted until the first month of 1952. On 26 January 1952, she stood out of San Diego in company with USS Arnold J. Isbell and USS Stickell bound for the Korean War once more. After stops at Pearl Harbor, Midway, and Yokosuka, she reported for duty in the screen of TF 77 on 25 February 1952. That assignment lasted until 19 March when she rejoined TF 95 at Wonsan harbour. Over the next two weeks, the destroyer delivered gunfire on enemy installations. She also received return fire from shore batteries; and, on 25 March, she took a hit on the centerline amidships that injured three crewmen. Relieved of duty at Wonsan on 1 April, Brinkley Bass headed for Yokosuka and repairs.

Back on station with TF 77 by mid-April, the warship screened the carriers and participated in shore bombardments for the next six weeks. The last week of that tour saw her assisting the Republic of Korea frigate ROKS Apnok 62 which had nearly been severed in half in a collision. On 27 May, she was detached from TF 77 for an eight-day respite at Sasebo. The warship was back off Wonsan on 6 June and spent two weeks bombarding the North Koreans. On 22 June, her division, DesDiv 52, was relieved at Wonsan and shaped a course for Okinawa whence she conducted two weeks of antisubmarine warfare training. Following that, Brinkley Bass served a two-week tour with the Taiwan Strait patrol. On 28 July, the destroyer rejoined the screen of TF 77. On 31 July, she performed her last mission of the deployment—a gunfire mission on the eastern coast of Korea.

Brinkley Bass returned to San Diego on 26 August 1952 and began post-deployment leave and upkeep. On 15 September, the warship departed San Diego on her way to the Puget Sound Naval Shipyard. The overhaul lasted until late January 1953. On the 26th, she got underway to return to San Diego whence she operated through the second week in April. On 18 April, the destroyer stood out of San Diego on her way back to the Far East. Once again, she alternated between assignments with TF 77, TF 95, and the Taiwan Strait patrol. The mission lasted until 2 November 1953 at which time she departed Yokosuka to return to San Diego. Following a December of leave and upkeep, Brinkley Bass entered the Hunters Point Naval Shipyard for another overhaul. After those repairs, the warship resumed training operations out of San Diego in preparation for another deployment to the Far East.

The armistice ending hostilities in Korea had taken effect on 27 July 1953 during the warship's most recent deployment to the western Pacific. Consequently, her tours of duty in the Far East over the ensuing decade assumed a more peaceful and routine character. Between July 1953 and June 1963, Brinkley Bass deployed to the Orient seven times. In each instance, she coupled visits to various Asiatic ports with exercises with units of the United States Seventh Fleet and intermittent duty on the Taiwan Strait patrol. Only during 1961 did she see no time overseas because of an extensive Fleet Rehabilitation and Modernization (FRAM) overhaul.

The last of those peacetime cruises ended at Long Beach in June 1963. That was followed by 27 months of duty along the California coast that also included a four-month regular overhaul at the Hunters Point Naval Shipyard between April and August 1964. Just as she was preparing to leave the yard, an event, the Tonkin Gulf incident, occurred off the coast of Vietnam. It helped to bring the United States into the Vietnamese civil war as a full belligerent. Though Brinkley Bass spent another year in peaceful operations along the west coast, that incident meant that her remaining Far East deployments would be of a combat nature.

==== Vietnam War ====
On 28 September 1965, the destroyer departed Long Beach in a task group built around the aircraft carrier USS Ticonderoga. The task group spent about two weeks engaged in exercises in the Hawaii operating area before continuing its voyage west. The warships arrived in Subic Bay in the Philippines on 30 October. Three days later, she was on her way to Vietnamese waters where she screened USS Independence (CVA-62) and served as her plane guard during air strikes on North Vietnam. That brief line tour ended 10 days later back at Naval Station Subic Bay. On 21 November, the destroyer put to sea once again. After type training at the Tabones shore bombardment range, she headed for Da Nang, South Vietnam, where she trained for duty as a search and rescue (SAR) ship in the Gulf of Tonkin. She then began a 30-day tour of duty on her SAR station.

Still engaged in SAR duties at the beginning of 1966, Brinkley Bass was not relieved of that mission until 5 February 1966. That relief occurred as a result of damage to her bow which she suffered in a collision with USS Waddell on the night of 4 and 5 February. After a stop at Da Nang where the damage was inspected, the destroyer moved on to Subic Bay where she received a false bow. On 7 March, the warship departed Subic Bay on her way to the United States and permanent repairs. Following stops at Guam, Midway, and Pearl Harbor, she arrived in Long Beach on 8 April. About a month later, the destroyer began repairs at the Long Beach Naval Shipyard. She left the drydock on 21 June and, soon thereafter, began normal west coast operations. That employment carried her through most of the remainder of 1966.

On 27 December 1966, Brinkley Bass stood out of Long Beach to return to the Far East. She made the usual stopover at Pearl Harbor and arrived in Yokosuka, Japan, on 15 January 1967. Four days later, the destroyer began the transit to Subic Bay where she arrived on the 24th. Following gunfire support training at the Tabones range early in February, she shaped a course for the south SAR station in company with USS Richmond K. Turner. The two warships arrived on station on 6 February. Over the next month, Brinkley Bass participated in one gunfire support mission and four SAR incidents. Relieved by USS Mansfield on 5 March, the destroyer headed for the northern fire support area of I Corps zone where she conducted one fire support mission on 8 March. She then steamed in company with USS Bon Homme Richard on Yankee Station before putting into Kaohsiung, Taiwan, on 19 March.

The warship remained at Kaohsiung until 27 March at which time she headed back to Vietnam. On the 29th, she relieved Waddell as gunfire support ship in the I Corps zone. She joined USS Bigelow in supporting the closing phase of Operation "Beacon Hill," a combination vertical and horizontal amphibious assault on Viet Cong and North Vietnamese forces threatening the United States Marine Corps Firebase Gio Linh. That operation ended on 1 April; and, the next day, Brinkley Bass relieved USS McCaffery along the shores of the II Corps zone. She spent the next six days supporting the 9th Republic of Korea (ROK) Regiment's Operation "Pang Ma Tao." On 7 April, the destroyer joined the screen of USS Enterprise on Yankee Station. That assignment lasted until 13 April when she transferred to a task group built around USS Ticonderoga. Ten days later, the warship returned to gunfire support missions in the northern portion of the II Corps zone.

Relieved of that duty on 27 April, she joined Ticonderoga and Waddell on the 25th for the passage to Subic Bay. Stops at Subic Bay, Hong Kong, and Yokosuka occupied her during the first half of May. On 19 May, Brinkley Bass departed Yokosuka on her way back to the United States. The warship arrived back in Long Beach on the 29th. After the usual post-deployment standdown period, she began normal operations out of Long Beach. That employment lasted until 1 September when the destroyer began preparations for her overhaul. She entered the Long Beach Naval Shipyard on 17 October and remained there through the end of the year.

Brinkley Bass completed her overhaul on 13 January 1968 and resumed local operations out of Long Beach. Those operations continued until 18 July when she departed Long Beach for the Far East in company with USS Decatur, Samuel N. Moore, and Harry E. Hubbard. The warships arrived in Pearl Harbor on 24 July and then put to sea again on the 25th to escort Hancock during the carrier's operational readiness inspection. Upon completion of that mission, the destroyer continued her voyage to the Orient in company with Hancock and arrived in Yokosuka on 8 August. The task group remained in Yokosuka until 11 August and then got underway for Subic Bay where it arrived on 15 August. Three days later, she was on her way to the Gulf of Tonkin. For almost five months, the destroyer divided her time between carrier escort duties and gunfire support missions. She completed her last line period on 8 January 1969 and headed for the Philippines. Brinkley Bass visited Subic Bay from 9 to 13 January and Yokosuka from 17 to 20 January. On the latter day, she got underway for home.

The warship arrived in Long Beach on 31 January 1969. There she began a leave and upkeep period that lasted until mid-April. On 14 April, she returned to sea to begin normal operations along the California coast. Training operations—including a midshipman training cruise to Pearl Harbor in July—occupied her time through the summer and fall of 1969. At the end of the year, Brinkley Bass began preparations for another tour of duty in the Far East. The destroyer departed Long Beach on 12 January 1970. After stops at Pearl Harbor, Midway, and Guam, she arrived in Subic Bay on 2 February. Once again, the warship spent five months alternating between Vietnamese waters and various ports in the Far East. When off Vietnam, she screened aircraft carriers and provided gunfire support for the troops ashore. In addition, she served one tour of duty on the Taiwan Strait patrol and conducted surveillance on Soviet trawlers snooping the American warships. Brinkley Bass departed Subic Bay and shaped a course via Guam, Midway, and Pearl Harbor for California. She arrived in Long Beach on 2 July.

After post-deployment leave and upkeep, the destroyer resumed training missions out of Long Beach. On 10 September, she entered the Long Beach Naval Shipyard for a three-month overhaul. The warship left the shipyard on 10 December and resumed normal operations along the California coast. That employment continued through the end of the year and well into 1971. On 14 May 1971, Brinkley Bass embarked upon her last deployment to the Orient. Steaming in company with USS Oriskany (CVA-34), she made a stop at Pearl Harbor before arriving in Subic Bay on 29 May. For almost four months, the warship served the familiar line periods off the coast of Vietnam screening carriers and providing gunfire support for the ground troops. She completed her last mission on 5 September and headed for Subic Bay. From there on 19 September, the warship embarked upon a circuitous voyage home. She made stops at the Australian ports of Darwin, Townsville, Sydney, and Napier before shaping a course for Long Beach on 11 October. She stopped at Pago Pago, Samoa, for fuel and at Pearl Harbor before returning to her home port on 24 October.

Brinkley Bass spent the rest of her active career in operations conducted between the west coast and Hawaii. For the most part, her duties consisted of training; and, after 1 July 1972, she became a Naval Reserve training ship. Thus, she trained reservists during their annual two weeks of active duty. At that same time, her home port was changed to Tacoma, Washington. She conducted her training missions from that port until decommissioned at San Diego on 3 December 1973. Her name was struck from the Navy list that same day and, she was simultaneously transferred to Brazil.

Brinkley Bass earned seven battle stars during the Korean conflict and nine battle stars for service in Vietnamese waters.

=== Brazilian Navy service ===
Brinkley Bass was transferred to Brazil and renamed Mariz e Barros (D-26). The Brazilian Navy decommissioned Mariz e Barros on 1 September 1997. She then served as a pierside training ship until expended as a target in December 2000.
