= Hamshire, Texas =

- Unincorporated community Census designated place
- Location within Texas Location within the United States
- Coordinates: 29°51′25″N 94°19′07″W
- Country: United States
- State: Texas
- County: Jefferson
- Elevation: 13 ft (4.0 m)
- Time zone: UTC-6 (Central (CST))
  - Summer (DST): UTC-5 (CDT)
- Area code: 409
- GNIS feature ID: 2805797

Hamshire (/ˈhæmʃər/ HAM-shər) is an unincorporated community and census designated place (CDP) in western Jefferson County, Texas, United States. As of the 2020 census, Hamshire had a population of 962. It is part of the Beaumont–Port Arthur Metropolitan Statistical Area and located on State Highway 124 twenty miles southwest of Beaumont.

== History ==
It was probably named for Lovan Hamshire, who developed the land as early as the 1870s. Hamshire was on the Gulf and Interstate Railway with a post office being established there in 1897. A townsite plat was filed in 1911 by Theodore F. Koch. Another major land dealer, Herbert Roedenbeck, subdivided additional land south of the railroad later that year, giving the subdivision the name Hamshire Gardens. Although there was interest shown by local rice farmers, Hamshire had only fifty inhabitants in 1928. The Fannett (1927) and Stowell (1941) oil fields discovery initiated new development in western Jefferson County. By 1940, the population in Hamshire had grown to 200. Natural gas production at the Hamshire field also continued to be of major importance to the community's economy through the 1980s. By 1985 the community had an estimated 350 residents and twenty-two businesses. In 1990 the population remained an estimated 350.

== Demographics ==
Historical population
Census	Pop.	Note	%±
2020	962		—
U.S. Decennial Census; 1850–1900 1910; 1920 1930 1940; 1950 1960 1970; 1980 1990 2000; 2010 2020

Hamshire first appeared as a census designated place in the 2020 U.S. census.

=== 2020 Census ===
Hamshire CDP, Texas – Racial and ethnic composition Note: the US Census treats Hispanic/Latino as an ethnic category. This table excludes Latinos from the racial categories and assigns them to a separate category. Hispanics/Latinos may be of any race.
Race / Ethnicity (NH = Non-Hispanic)	Pop 2020	% 2020
White alone (NH)	798	82.95%
Black or African American alone (NH)	9	0.94%
Native American or Alaska Native alone (NH)	2	0.21%
Asian alone (NH)	6	0.62%
Native Hawaiian or Pacific Islander alone (NH)	0	0.00%
Other race alone (NH)	0	0.00%
Mixed race or Multiracial (NH)	24	2.49%
Hispanic or Latino (any race)	123	12.79%
Total	962	100.00%

== Education ==
Residents are served by the Hamshire-Fannett Independent School District.

Hamshire-Fannett ISD is assigned to Galveston College in Galveston.
