= Port of Port Arthur =

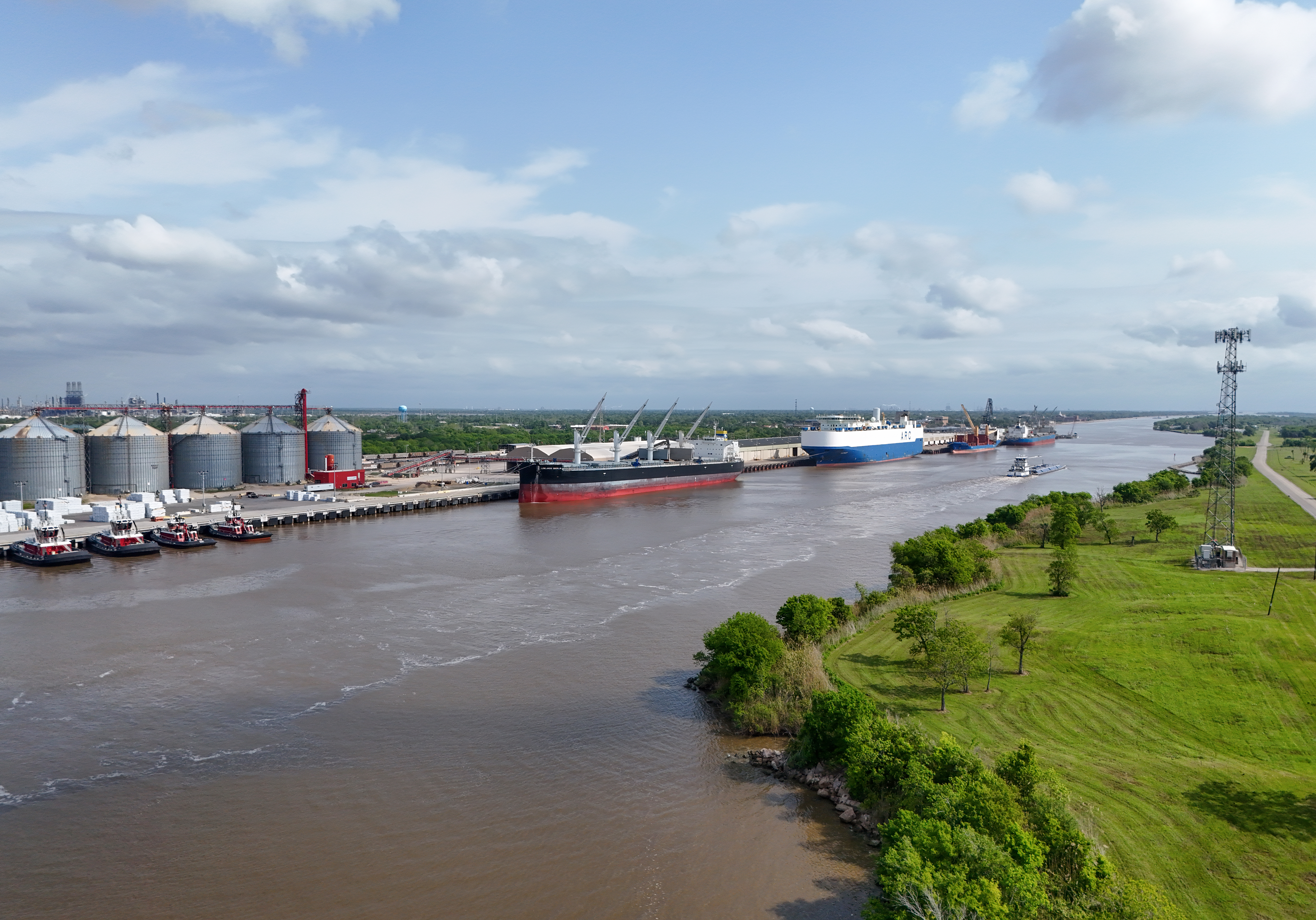
- Port of Port Arthur in 2025

Location
- Country: United States
- Location: Port Arthur, Texas
- Coordinates: 29.867099°N 93.936927°W
- UN/LOCODE: USFPO

Details
- Draft depth: Depth 49 feet (15 m)

Statistics
- Website http://www.portofportarthur.com

The Port of Port Arthur is a seaport in Port Arthur, Texas (United States).

== 2010 tanker collision ==
On 23 January 2010, an oil tanker and barge collided in the channel leading to Port Arthur, spilling up to 450,000 gallons of oil into the seaway. The tanker was chartered by ExxonMobil and was bound for Exxon's refinery in Beaumont, Texas.
