= John Tomlin (American football) =

American football coach

Biographical details
- Born: September 5, 1912; Washington, D.C., U.S.
- Died: December 24, 2001 (aged 89); Houston, Texas, U.S.

Coaching career (HC unless noted)
- 1934–1935: Westville HS (OK)
- 1936–1940: Maud HS (OK)
- 1941: Vinita HS (OK)
- 1942: Arkansas (freshmen)
- 1943: Arkansas
- 1944–1945: Arkansas (assistant)
- 1946–1953: Thomas Jefferson HS (TX)
- 1956–1961: Bishop Byrne HS (TX)
- 1962–1963: Marian HS (TX)

Head coaching record
- Overall: 2–7 (college)

John Francis "Bud" Tomlin II (September 5, 1912 – December 24, 2001) was an American football coach. He served as the head football coach at the University of Arkansas in 1943, compiling a 2–7 record.

== Early life ==
Tomlin was born in Washington, D.C., and raised in Muskogee, Oklahoma, where he graduated from high school. He also attended Muskogee Junior College there. Tomlin then matriculated at Oregon State College—now known as Oregon State University, where he played tackle for the Beavers football team. He earned a Bachelor of Arts degree from Northeastern State Teachers College—now known as Northeastern State University and a master's degree from the University of Iowa.

== Coaching ==
From 1934 to 1936, Tomlin coached and taught history at Westville High School in Westville, Oklahoma. In 1936, he was hired as physical education director, history teacher, and coach at Maud High School in Maud, Oklahoma. In 1941, he became the head coach at Vinita High School in Vinita, Oklahoma.

Tomlin was hired as freshman coach at Arkansas in the fall of 1942. He succeeded George Cole as head football coach in 1943 when Cole left to serve in the United States Navy. He was given a contract for the 1944 season, but the school chose to replace him with Glen Rose after Rose received a medical discharge from the United States Army. Tomlin agreed to stay on as an assistant on the condition that he receive the same salary he would have as head coach.

In 1946, Tomlin returned to the high school ranks as the head coach at Thomas Jefferson High School in Port Arthur, Texas. Over eight seasons, he led the Yellow Jackets to 68–12–8 record, five district titles, two appearances in the state semifinals, and two appearances in the state quarterfinals. He was fired in February 1954 for "lack of cooperation with the school administration". Following his dismissal, he managed an apartment building in Houston. In 1956, he returned to coaching at Bishop Byrne High School in Port Arthur. In six seasons, he had an overall record of 12–14–3. He left the school in 1962 to become the head coach and athletic director at Marian High School in Houston. The move allowed him to be closer to his business interests.

== Later life ==
Tomlin resided in Nacogdoches, Texas before moving to a retirement community in Houston. He died on December 24, 2001 and was buried at Woodlawn Garden of Memories Cemetery.

== Head coaching record ==
=== College ===
Year	Team	Overall	Conference	Standing	Bowl/playoffs
Arkansas Razorbacks (Southwest Conference) (1943)
1943	Arkansas	2–7	1–4	T–5th	
Arkansas:		3–7	1–4		
Total:		3–7			
