= Kary Vincent =

American football player (1969–2018)

Profile
- Position: Defensive back

Personal information
- Born: September 19, 1969; Port Arthur, Texas, U.S.
- Died: December 26, 2018 (aged 49); Call, Texas, U.S.
- Listed height: 6 ft 0 in (1.83 m)
- Listed weight: 185 lb (84 kg)

Career information
- High school: Thomas Jefferson (Port Arthur)
- College: Texas A&M
- NFL draft: 1992: 6th round, 164th overall pick

Career history
- New Orleans Saints (1992)*; Toronto Argonauts (1993)*; Charlotte Rage (1994); Milwaukee Mustangs (1995)
- * Offseason or practice squad member only

Career AFL statistics
- Receptions: 4
- Receiving yards: 16
- Tackles: 17.5
- Total TDs: 2
- Stats at ArenaFan.com

Kary Lamont Vincent Sr. (September 19, 1969 – December 26, 2018) was an American football defensive back. He was selected by the New Orleans Saints in the sixth round of the 1992 NFL draft after playing college football at Texas A&M University. He played professionally in the Arena Football League (AFL) for two seasons with the Charlotte Rage and Milwaukee Mustangs

== Early life and college ==
Kary Lamont Vincent Sr. was born on September 19, 1969, in Port Arthur, Texas. He participated in football and track at Thomas Jefferson High School in Port Arthur.

Vincent played college football for the Texas A&M Aggies of Texas A&M University. He recorded three interceptions in 1991.

== Professional career ==
Vincent was selected by the New Orleans Saints in the sixth round, with the 164th overall pick, of the 1992 NFL draft. He was waived by the Saints on August 25, 1992.

Vincent signed with the Toronto Argonauts of the Canadian Football League in 1993 but was later released.

Vincent played in three games for the Charlotte Rage of the Arena Football League (AFL) in 1994, recording three solo tackles, two assisted tackles, and one pass breakup.

Vincent appeared in six games for the Milwaukee Mustangs of the AFL during the 1995 season, totaling 13 solo tackles, one assisted tackle, one fumble recovery, one pass breakup, and four receptions for 16 yards and two touchdowns. He was a wide receiver/defensive back during his time in the AFL as the league played under ironman rules.

== Personal life ==
Vincent was the father of NFL player Kary Vincent Jr. On April 27, 2005, he was hit by a driver while riding his motorcycle. Vincent and the driver later settled out of court. He was a track and football coach at Memorial High School in Port Arthur. He was also a teacher at Thomas Jefferson Middle School in Port Arthur. Vincent died of pneumonia on December 26, 2018, in Call, Texas.
