= Goose Gonsoulin =

American football player (1938–2014)

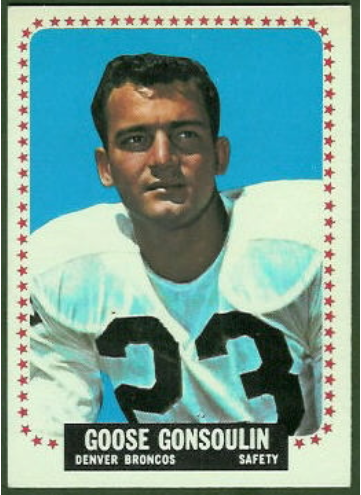
- Gonsoulin on a 1964 Topps football card

No. 23, 35
- Position: Safety

Personal information
- Born: June 7, 1938; Port Arthur, Texas, U.S.
- Died: September 8, 2014 (aged 76); Beaumont, Texas, U.S.
- Listed height: 6 ft 3 in (1.91 m)
- Listed weight: 210 lb (95 kg)

Career information
- High school: Thomas Jefferson (Port Arthur)
- College: Baylor
- NFL draft: 1960: 17th round, 203rd overall pick
- AFL draft: 1960

Career history
- Denver Broncos (1960–1966); San Francisco 49ers (1967)

Awards and highlights
- 5× All-AFL (1960–1964); 5× AFL All-Star (1961–1964, 1966); AFL All-Time second-team; Denver Broncos Ring of Fame; AFL record: Most passes intercepted in a single game: 4 (tied)

Career NFL/AFL statistics
- Interceptions: 46
- Touchdowns: 2
- Sacks: 1
- Stats at Pro Football Reference

Austin William "Goose" Gonsoulin (June 7, 1938 – September 8, 2014) was an American professional football player who was a safety in the American Football League (AFL) for the Denver Broncos and in the National Football League (NFL) for the San Francisco 49ers. He had the first interception in AFL history, and was named to five of the AFL's first six All-Star Teams.

== Early life ==
Gonsoulin was born on June 7, 1938, in Port Arthur, Texas. He was contemporaneously referenced as having played football at Port Arthur High School, where he was a star running back and punt returner. He was also a star on the track team. In 1955, the 195 lb. (88.5 kg) Gonsoulin was chosen first-team All-District at halfback. He was also named second-team Texas AAAA All-State in football as a senior.

Gonsoulin is also reported as having attended Thomas Jefferson High School in Port Arthur. At the time he attended high school, there was school segregation in Port Arthur; with white students attending Thomas Jefferson High School and black students attending Abraham Lincoln High School. Hall of Fame football coach Jimmy Johnson and rock and roll singer Janis Joplin attended Jefferson a few years after Gonsoulin graduated.

== College career ==
Gonsoulin played college football for the Baylor Bears where he was a receiver, halfback and a defensive back. He captained the freshman team as a two-way player. As a sophomore, on offense, Gonsoulin rushed 16 times for 50 yards, and had six receptions for 117 yards (19.5 yards per catch). On offense in his junior year (1958), he was used as a receiver. In a late November 1958 game against the Rice Owls, Gonsoulin caught a 71-yard touchdown pass, a three-yard touchdown pass and intercepted a pass. He had 16 receptions for 280 yards as a junior. Gonsoulin played safety on defense, and was known for his coverage and tackling abilities.

In 1959, as a senior, his teammates selected the laconic and even-keeled Gonsoulin as their team captain. He was both a rusher and receiver in his final season at Baylor. He had 72 rushing yards in 27 carries, and 18 receptions for 235 yards and two touchdowns. He was in the Southwest Conference's top five in receiving yards in both 1958 and 1959. Among his Baylor teammates that year was future NFL running back Ronnie Bull, who was the team's leading rusher in 1959.

A Baylor coach, Hayden Fry, gave Gonsoulin the nickname “Goose” during his senior season, and the name stuck for the rest of his life.

In December 1959, he played in the second annual Copper Bowl college all-star game. Gonsoulin had an interception and fumble recovery on defense in the game, and was named the Southwest all-stars outstanding back for the game.

== Professional career ==
The New York Giants prematurely drafted Gonsoulin in the 17th round of the 1959 NFL draft, while he was still a junior in college, and he remained in school. He was selected in the 17th round of the 1960 NFL draft by the San Francisco 49ers and drafted by the Dallas Texans in the 1960 American Football League (AFL) draft, and would play in the AFL. Shortly before the league’s inaugural season he was traded to the Denver Broncos for fullback Jake Spikes. He played on the Broncos from 1960 to 1966, for a team that never had a winning season; though Gonsoulin himself was selected to play in the five of the first six AFL All-Star Games.

Gonsoulin's first season with the Denver Broncos was also the first year of the American Football League's (AFL) existence. He started 14 games at free safety. During the AFL's inaugural week, Gonsoulin intercepted two passes against the Boston Patriots. His first interception was also the first interception in AFL history. In the second game of the 1960 season against the Buffalo Bills, on September 18, 1960, Gonsoulin intercepted four passes, still tied for the AFL/NFL record of most interceptions in a game. He was selected as defensive player of the week.

The following week against the New York Titans (later the New York Jets), he intercepted his seventh pass of the 1960 season. Overall in 1960, Gonsoulin had 11 interceptions, which remains a Broncos' team record. He led the AFL in interceptions. He was named first-team All-AFL by the AFL and the Associated Press (AP), and second-team All-AFL by United Press International (UPI).

In 1961, Gonsoulin again started all 14 games for the Broncos at free safety. He had six interceptions (tied for 8th best in the AFL), and was selected to play in the AFL's first All-Star Game on January 7, 1962. In 1962, Gonsoulin started 13 of the 14 games in which he played, with seven interceptions (tied for 7th best in the AFL). In a Friday night game on October 5, 1962, Gonsoulin returned an interception 64 yards for a touchdown against the Oakland Raiders. He was selected to play in the 1962 All-Star Game, and was again named first-team All-AFL by The Sporting News and AP, and second-team All-AFL by UPI.

He started 14 games in 1963, with six interceptions (tied for 6th best in the AFL). In an early October game against the San Diego Chargers he returned an interception 43 yards for a touchdown. He was again selected an All-Star, and was named first team All-AFL by The Sporting News, and second-team All-AFL by the Newspaper Enterprise Association (NEA). In 1964, he started 11 of 14 games in which he played, with seven interceptions (tied for 6th best in the AFL), and was once again named an All-Star. In an October 11, 1964 game against the Kansas City Chiefs, he had three interceptions against future Hall of Fame quarterback Len Dawson. The UPI named him second-team All-AFL.

He started 10 of the 14 games in which he played in 1965, with six interceptions. He was not selected as an AFL All-Star for the only time in his AFL career, during which the game existed. In 1966, he missed time with a knee injury, starting and playing in only ten games, with no interceptions. However, the fans still selected him to play in the AFL All-Star Game for his good play in other aspects of defense.

He learned the Broncos cut him before the 1967 season began, via an anonymous telephone call. The reality was confirmed for him when he was listening to the radio in his car after getting the disturbing telephone call. Gonsoulin had been released as part of new head coach Lou Saban's decision to use younger players on the Broncos. Gonsoulin thought his treatment unfair, as he was waived before having a chance to even speak with Saban. When interviewed about it, he concluded, "'But that's football'".

Gonsoulin was signed by the National Football League's San Francisco 49ers, who still held his rights from the 1960 draft. He suffered a neck injury during the 1967 season that cause him to miss some games; but still started eight games and had three interceptions. However, despite playing after the neck injury during the 1967 season, the 49ers informed Gonsoulin before the 1968 season that the injury would prevent the team from allowing him to play again, and he did not pass the team physical. Gonsoulin then chose to retire.

Gonsoulin was a Sporting News AFL All-League player in 1960, 1962, and 1963. His amazing durability and toughness enabled him to start 61 consecutive games at one point in his career.

== Legacy and honors ==
Gonsoulin was one of the four inaugural members inducted into the Bronco's Ring of Fame in 1984. He also was inducted into the Colorado Sports Hall of Fame in 1984. Gonsoulin was selected to the second unit of the American Football League All-Time Team. He has been named to numerous all-time Bronco teams, including the 20th Anniversary Team (1980), the 50th Anniversary Team (2009) and in 2019 as part of the NFL's 100th anniversary commemorations. As in college, with the Broncos he was "'Popular, quiet-spoken . . . respected by teammates and . . . worked hard to preserve team morale'".

In Denver, he was considered an "original Bronco", and led the team four times in interceptions. When he left the AFL in 1966, after seven years in the league, he held the record for most interceptions in AFL history (43). This AFL record was surpassed in 1968 by Houston Oilers' safety Jim Norton during his ninth AFL season. He was tied for 6th all-time in interceptions (46) when he played his last game in 1967. He is third all-time in AFL history in interceptions. He held the Broncos' interception record until 1987 when it was surpassed by Steve Foley. In addition to being a top pass defender, he was also known as a hard-hitting tackler. He suffered numerous concussions when tackling others, but in his playing years, his experience was he would be asked a few questions such as what was your name and where were you born, and then given smelling salts and returned to play.

The hardest collision in which he was involved came against the Houston Oilers and Billy Cannon in 1962. Gonsoulin's helmet hit the hard running Cannon's knee when he was attempting a tackle. Gonsoulin was knocked unconscious and swallowed his tongue. The team's trainers could not open his jaws and were about to break his teeth when teammate Bud McFadin was able to pry open Gonsoulin's mouth. It has also been reported that trainer Fred Posey was the one able to pull Gonsoulin's tongue free. When Gonsoulin regained consciousness on his way to the hospital, he was unaware of what had happened. Gonsoulin was back at practice two days later. Over his career Gonsoulin had numerous injuries, some long-term.

== Personal life ==
After retiring from football, he operated a construction company.

== Death ==
Gonsoulin died on September 8, 2014. He had been in hospice care in Beaumont, Texas, suffering from prostate cancer.

== See also ==
- List of American Football League players
