= Alfred Zack McElroy =

African American mayor in Texas

Alfred McElroy
- Born: Alfred Zack McElroy; 5 March 1930; Sour Lake, Hardin County, Texas, U.S.
- Died: 10 October 1990 (aged 60)
- Education: Wiley College; Washington State University
- Occupations: Teacher (1956-1965); politician
- Spouses: Vernita Vital (dis.); Charlotte K. Smith (m. 1973)
- Children: 4 (Vital)

Member, Port Arthur Board of Education
- In office 1966–1990

Alfred Zack "A.Z." McElroy (March 5, 1930 – October 10, 1990) was an American teacher and politician. After serving on the Port Arthur Board of Education, McElroy ran, in 1977, for mayor of Port Arthur, Texas with three other African American candidates. All African American candidates were defeated. A subsequent challenge to the federal district court and appeal to the U.S. Supreme Court, led to the voting rights decision in the landmark case of The City of Port Arthur v. United States.

== Biography ==
=== Early years and education ===
Alfred McElroy was born to Arthur Lewis McElroy and Clara J. Austin on March 5, 1930 outside Sour Lake, in Hardin County, Texas. He attended Wiley College in Marshall and graduated with a bachelor of science degree in 1953. He then served two years in the U.S. army and graduated with a master's in physical education at Washington State University.

=== Early career ===
McElroy taught mathematics and science and served as an assistant coach at Lincoln High School in Port Arthur, from 1956-1965. He became head coach of the Lincoln High School football team, the Bees, in about 1961 or 1962. He and his wife, Vernita Vital, had four children. In 1973, McElroy married his second wife, Charlotte K. Smith. The two met through their work with the Economic Opportunity Commission of Southeast Texas.

McElroy also served as an election precinct judge and he served with the Boy Scouts as the committee chairman of the Beauchamp Scout District.

=== Political career ===
==== Port Arthur Board of Education ====
McElroy entered the race for the Port Arthur school board in February 1966. The Port Arthur News described him as a local insurance agent and former head football coach at Lincoln High School; and didn't mention was that McElroy was fired from his position as head coach when he voiced concerns that football players at the local white high school had washing machines for their uniforms, new helmets for every player, and other equipment. Football players at Lincoln, the black high school, did not have the same equipment. McElroy's wife washed the players uniforms. After ten years in leadership at Lincoln High School, McElroy was well-known in the black community. He swept the elections in April 1966 to become the first black member of the Port Arthur Board of Education. Over the ensuing decade, he often served as president of the board.

==== Mayoral election of 1977 ====
In February 1977 McElroy announced his candidacy for mayor of Port Arthur. A few days later, Paul Strawder, another African-American, announced his candidacy; Ike Linden and JoAnn Benjamin followed; all four African American. On March 10, 1977, the group of four candidates announced they were running as a slate. McElroy released "a seven-page platform based on the 3 R's: Redevelop, Rehabilitate, and Revitalize the City of Port Arthur."

Legal actions

On April 3, 1977, The Port Arthur News declared that Bernis Sadler won the mayoral election. All of the African American candidates were defeated. Shortly after the election results were published, Walter Mosely, Willie Lewis, Rev. Bill Land and Rev. C.O. Hall, all Port Arthur citizens, filed a suit in federal district court alleging that "the city's election system denied blacks fair representation on the city council." The plaintiffs cited their rights under the 14th amendment of equal protection under the law and the 15th amendment of the right to vote.

After several years of maneuvering, involving attorneys with the office of U.S. Attorney General for Civil Rights (under the now defunct section 5 of the Voting Rights Act), attorneys for the City of Port Arthur were granted a hearing before a panel of three judges in the federal district court. Presided over by Judge Richey, the court found in favor of African-Americans Mosely, Lewis, Land, and Hall. Not only did Richey et al. affirm the legality of single-member districts, the panel also affirmed the need for a plurality threshold (rather than a majority-vote threshold) to determine the election winner for some city council seats. After which, the City of Port Arthur appealed to the U.S. Supreme Court; and, in The City of Port Arthur v. United States, the Supreme Court, in a 6-3 decision, upheld the plurality component of the ruling, which gave African-Americans a better chance of winning elections. As Laughlin McDonald argues, the majority vote requirement usually displaces the initial victor.

== Death and legacy ==
McElroy died in a car crash on October 10, 1990. He was 60 years old.

While his political career was full of tension and violence, McElroy was fondly remembered in the days after his death. Friends believe he had an epileptic seizure while driving; and claimed that his epilepsy developed after a severe beating he received from the police in Port Arthur shortly after McElroy lost the mayoral election in 1977. The violent arrest was chronicled in The Port Arthur News - as were the many trials to determine whether he was innocent or guilty of resisting arrest - but his epilepsy diagnosis and cause of death were only documented by conversations with friends.

At the time of his death, McElroy was serving his 23rd year on the Port Arthur Independent School District board. School superintendent "Dr. Joe Pitts described him as a fearless leader, a tireless worker, an advocate of quality education and a statesman." Fred Mitchell, a trustee of the Port Arthur School District stated: "Through the years, he was very civic-minded. He made so many contributions to the community, and especially to the school board." The Port Arthur News reported that "…his contributions to education went beyond the local boards. In 1970 he was appointed by President Nixon to the National Advisory Council on the Education of Disadvantaged Children, and he later was named chairman. President Ford appointed McElroy to the National Advisory Council on Equality of Educational Opportunity."

In 2018, there were calls to rename the local high school, named in honor of Robert E. Lee, a Confederate Army officer, in honor of McElroy. The call was rejected by the local school board; however, Lee's name was replaced.
