= Tim McKyer =

American football player (born 1963)

No. 22, 33, 24, 26
- Position: Cornerback

Personal information
- Born: September 5, 1963 (age 63); Orlando, Florida, U.S.
- Listed height: 6 ft 0 in (1.83 m)
- Listed weight: 174 lb (79 kg)

Career information
- High school: Abraham Lincoln (Port Arthur, Texas)
- College: Texas-Arlington
- NFL draft: 1986: 3rd round, 64th overall pick
- Expansion draft: 1995: 6th round, 12th overall pick

Career history
- San Francisco 49ers (1986–1989); Miami Dolphins (1990); Atlanta Falcons (1991–1992); Detroit Lions (1993); Pittsburgh Steelers (1994); Carolina Panthers (1995); Atlanta Falcons (1996); Denver Broncos (1997)

Awards and highlights
- 3× Super Bowl champion (XXIII, XXIV, XXXII); PFWA All-Rookie Team (1986)

Career NFL statistics
- Interceptions: 33
- Interception yards: 235
- Touchdowns: 2
- Stats at Pro Football Reference

Timothy Bernard McKyer (born September 5, 1963) is an American former professional football player who was a cornerback for 12 seasons in the National Football League (NFL). He was selected by the San Francisco 49ers in the third round of the 1986 NFL draft and played for seven different teams from 1986 to 1997.

== Early life ==
McKyer attended Lincoln High School in Port Arthur, Texas, and then the University of Texas at Arlington.

== NFL ==
A 6'0", 174 lb. cornerback, McKyer is a three-time Super Bowl champion, two victories with the 49ers in 1988 and 1989 and one with the Denver Broncos in 1997. During his rookie season with San Francisco, he intercepted 6 passes for 33 yards and 1 touchdown. He was a second team All-Conference corner for two NFL seasons and was named to the "All-Madden Team".

McKyer became a journeyman throughout the 1990s, bouncing from team to team. This earned him the nickname "Frequent Flyer McKyer." He ended his NFL career after the 1997 season. He gave up the game-winning touchdown to Tony Martin in the 1994 AFC Championship game while with the Pittsburgh Steelers. The touchdown allowed the heavy underdog San Diego Chargers to reach Super Bowl XXIX in one of the biggest upsets in AFC Championship history. During the Carolina Panthers' inaugural season, he intercepted a pass and scored on a 96-yard interception return for a touchdown to defeat the Super Bowl champion (and NFC West division rival) San Francisco 49ers. During Super Bowl XXXII while playing for the Denver Broncos, he recovered a fumble on a kickoff return during the third quarter.

== Personal life ==
In February 2024, McKyer was arrested in Florida on five charges of fleeing the scene of a crash.
