= Memorial High School (Port Arthur, Texas) =

Memorial Sr. High School

Location
- 3501 Lucian Adams St, Port Arthur, Texas; United States; 29.935727°N 93.966470°W

Information
- Type: Public, co-educational
- Motto: "Building for Success"
- Established: August 2002 (new campus opened for 2009–10 school year)
- School district: Port Arthur ISD
- Principal: Glenn Mitchell
- Staff: 160.72 (FTE)
- Grades: 9–12
- Enrollment: 2,068 (2023–2024)
- Student to teacher ratio: 12.90
- Campus size: 2,500
- Campus type: Urban
- Colors: Red, Black & Silver
- Mascot: Mighty Titan
- Team name: Titans
- Newspaper: The Titan Times
- Yearbook: The Titanium
- Website: Memorial High School website

Memorial High School is a public, co-educational secondary school located in Port Arthur, Texas, United States. It was established in August 2002 after a merger of three previous high schools: Thomas Jefferson, Abraham Lincoln, and Stephen F. Austin. Since then, Port Arthur Memorial High School has been the only high school in the Port Arthur Independent School District. It serves most of Port Arthur and a portion of Groves. Initially, the school used the former Lincoln and Jefferson campuses; its new facility opened for the 2009–10 school year on the northern side of Port Arthur. It also has a 9th Grade Center in the Port Acres area of Port Arthur, on the former Austin Middle School campus.

When Thomas Jefferson, Abraham Lincoln and Stephen F. Austin high schools were consolidated, students voted on the name for the new high school and the top two vote-getters were "Memorial High School" and "Thurgood Marshall High School". In September 2007, school board member Terry Doyle suggested renaming Memorial High School after the late Staff Sgt. Lucian Adams, a Port Arthur native who received the Medal of Honor for his bravery in World War II. Employees of the school district established a museum of artifacts from the three former high schools plus the Catholic Bishop Byrne High School.

== Athletics ==
Memorial High School currently participates in District 22-5A. Memorial participates in the following UIL sports where it has had success in many district championships and playoff wins:

- Football
- Volleyball
- Cheerleading
- Cross Country
- Basketball
- Soccer
- Track and Field
- Swimming and Diving
- Baseball
- Softball
- Tennis
- Powerlifting
- Golf

== Organizations ==
Memorial has many organizations including an award winning:

- Marching Band known as "The Marching Heat"
- Dance/Drill Team known as the "Flames" usually made up of 30-60 girls
- The Titan Press Newspaper and Yearbook
- NJROTC
- Theatre
- MHS Choir on Fire

Among over 30 clubs.

== Notable alumni ==
- J'Covan Brown (born 1990), basketball player in the Israel Basketball Premier League
- Jamaal Charles (born 1986), former NFL running back
- Danny Gorrer (born 1986), former NFL cornerback
- Jaylon Guilbeau (born 2004), NFL cornerback
- Kenneth Lofton Jr. (born 2002), basketball power forward/center in the Israeli Basketball Premier League and NBA
- Inika McPherson (born 1986), national champion high jumper
- Elandon Roberts (born 1994), NFL linebacker
- Amber Chardae Robinson, actress
- Kary Vincent Jr. (born 1999, NFL defensive back

Thomas Jefferson alumni

- Bun B, rapper and former member of UGK
- G. W. Bailey (Class of 1961) — stage, television and film actor
- Todd Dodge — former Texas high school football coach
- Kevin Everett, former NFL tight end
- Goose Gonsoulin, former NFL safety
- Gary Hammond, former NFL wide receiver and running back
- Xavier Hernandez, former MLB pitcher
- James Johnson, former NFL running back
- Jimmy Johnson (Class of 1961) — Pro Football Hall of Fame coach, also a college coach
- Paul Jones, professional wrestler
- Janis Joplin (Class of 1960) — A rock, soul, and blues singer and songwriter, member of the Rock and Roll Hall of Fame
- Carl Larpenter, former NFL offensive lineman
- Dan Rogas, former NFL offensive lineman
- Cotton Speyrer, former NFL wide receiver
- Raymond Strother, political consultant
- Joe Washington, former NFL running back

Abraham Lincoln alumni

- Aaron Brown, former NFL defensive end
- Jonathan Babineaux, former NFL defensive tackle
- Jordan Babineaux, former NFL cornerback
- Pimp C, rapper and former member of UGK
- Mike Green, former NFL linebacker
- Stephen Jackson, former NBA guard
- Bobby Leopold, former NFL linebacker
- Tim McKyer, former NFL cornerback
- Marcus Price, former NFL offensive lineman

Stephen F. Austin alumni

- Eric Alexander, former NFL linebacker
- Duriel Harris, former NFL wide receiver
