= Marcus Price =

American football player (born 1972)

No. 79, 70, 73
- Position: Offensive tackle / guard

Personal information
- Born: March 3, 1972 (age 54); Houston, Texas, U.S.
- Listed height: 6 ft 4 in (1.93 m)
- Listed weight: 310 lb (141 kg)

Career information
- High school: Abraham Lincoln (Port Arthur, Texas)
- College: LSU
- NFL draft: 1995: 6th round, 172nd overall pick

Career history
- Jacksonville Jaguars (1995); Denver Broncos (1996)*; Jacksonville Jaguars (1997)*; San Diego Chargers (1997–1999); New Orleans Saints (2000–2001); Buffalo Bills (2002–2004); Dallas Cowboys (2005)
- * Offseason or practice squad member only

Career NFL statistics
- Games played: 77
- Games started: 10
- Stats at Pro Football Reference

Marcus Raymond Price (born March 3, 1972) is an American former professional football player who was an offensive tackle in the National Football League (NFL) for the Jacksonville Jaguars, San Diego Chargers, New Orleans Saints, Buffalo Bills and Dallas Cowboys. He played college football for the LSU Tigers.

== Early life ==
Price attended Lincoln High School, where he began to play football as a junior. He was a two-way tackle and a two-time All-district selection. He also competed in the discus throw.

He accepted a football scholarship from Louisiana State University. As a redshirt freshman, he appeared in 8 games as a backup. As a sophomore, he was a backup at left tackle for 10 games and at left guard for one game.

As a junior, he became a starter at right tackle. As a senior, he was the starter at right tackle, contributing to the offense averaging 220.3 passing yards per game.

== Professional career ==
=== Jacksonville Jaguars ===
Price was selected by the Jacksonville Jaguars in the sixth round (172nd overall) of the 1995 NFL draft. He was a part of the franchise's inaugural season. He suffered torn ligaments in his left ankle in the third preseason game against the Miami Dolphins. He was placed on the injured reserve list on August 19.

He was waived on August 25, 1996. On February 3, 1997, he was re-signed by the Jaguars. He was released on August 19.

=== San Diego Chargers ===
On November 25, 1997, he was signed by the San Diego Chargers to the practice squad. He was promoted to the active roster and saw action in the last 2 games at offensive tackle.

In 1998, he appeared in 10 games as a backup and on special teams. He was cut on September 21, 1999.

=== New Orleans Saints ===
On March 23, 2000, he was signed as a free agent by the New Orleans Saints. He was cut on December 4. He was re-signed on December 7, finishing the season after playing in 7 games and being declared inactive in 8 contests.

In 2001, he appeared in 12 games. He was not re-signed after the season.

=== Buffalo Bills ===
On March 12, 2002, he was signed as a free agent by the Buffalo Bills, to a $1.875 million three-year contract that included a $150,000 signing bonus. He played in 3 seasons as a reserve swing tackle. He wasn't re-signed after the 2004 season.

=== Dallas Cowboys ===
On November 27, 2005, he was signed by the Dallas Cowboys as a free agent, to provide depth after the season-ending injury to Pro Bowl player Flozell Adams. He was declared inactive in 4 games and was not re-signed after the season.

== Coaching career ==
After retiring, Price coached football at Westview High School in San Diego, California. From 2013 to 2021, he was a technology applications teacher and football coach at Scoggins Middle School In Mckinney, TX. He then became a teacher at Rushing Middle School in Prosper, Texas until 2023. He is now a coach at Prestonwood Christian Academy North located in Prosper, Texas.
