= Griffing Park, Port Arthur, Texas =

Griffing Park is an area of Port Arthur, Texas, United States, formerly a separate city in Jefferson County. It incorporated on November 13, 1929, the same year Port Arthur began its attempts to annex it. The proposed annexations were blocked by injunctions; the first was removed on November 26, 1929, and the second began in May 1930. In 1983 Port Arthur annexed it and the town's attitude during the 1983 merging process with Port Arthur has been described as "kicking and screaming."

== Education ==
Griffing Park is within the Port Arthur Independent School District.
