= Kary Vincent Jr. =

American football player (born 1999)

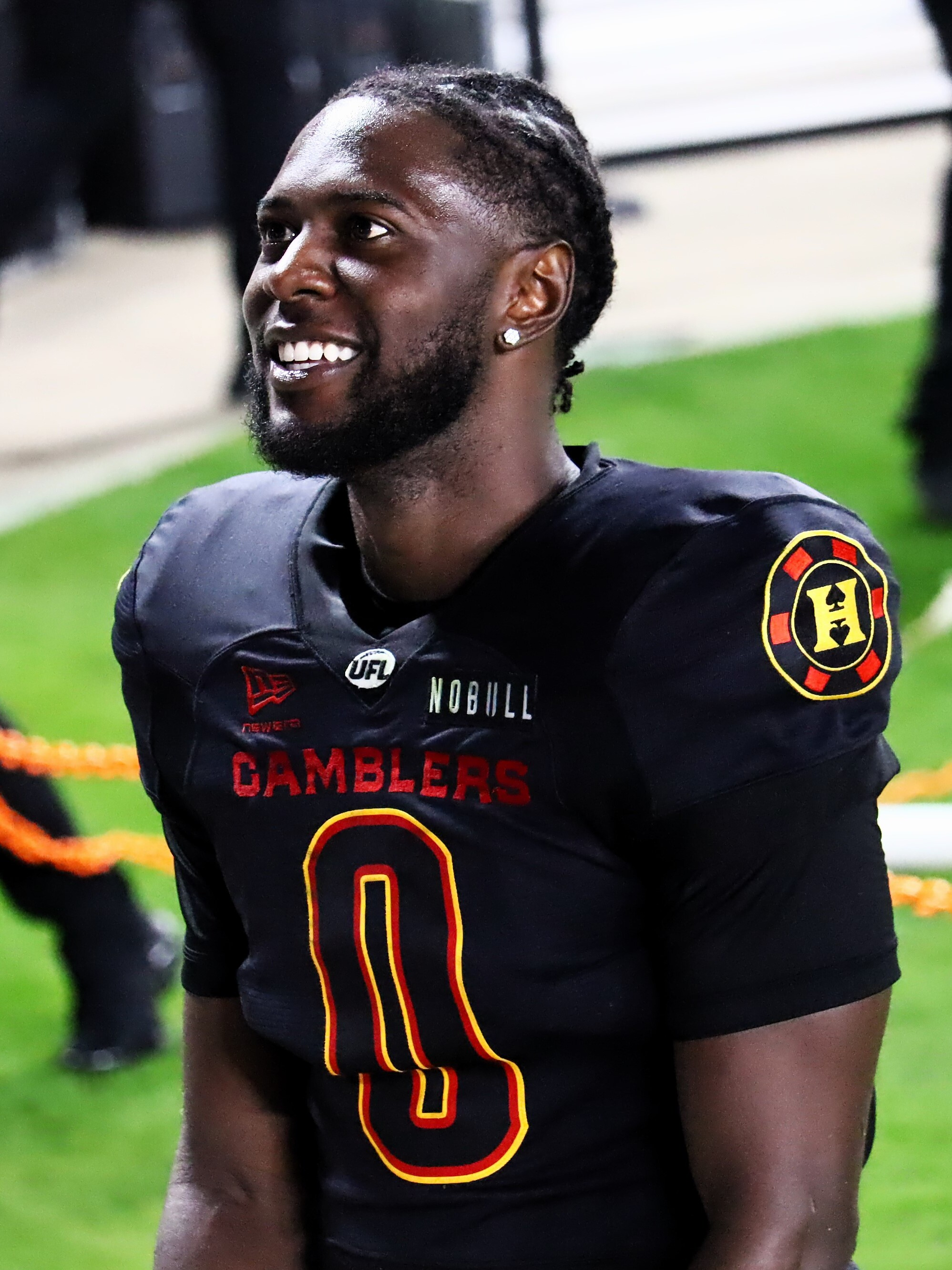
- Vincent with the Houston Gamblers in 2026

Louisville Kings
- Position: Defensive back
- Roster status: Active

Personal information
- Born: February 27, 1999 (age 27); Port Arthur, Texas, U.S.
- Listed height: 5 ft 10 in (1.78 m)
- Listed weight: 185 lb (84 kg)

Career information
- High school: Memorial (Port Arthur)
- College: LSU (2017–2020)
- NFL draft: 2021: 7th round, 237th overall pick

Career history
- Denver Broncos (2021); Philadelphia Eagles (2021); San Francisco 49ers (2022)*; San Antonio Brahmas (2023)*; Houston Roughnecks (2023); Toronto Argonauts (2024)*; San Antonio Brahmas (2025); Houston Gamblers (2026); Louisville Kings (2027–present)
- * Offseason or practice squad member only

Awards and highlights
- All-UFL Team (2026); CFP national champion (2019)

Career NFL statistics
- Total tackles: 2
- Stats at Pro Football Reference

Kary Lamont Vincent Jr. (born February 27, 1999) is an American professional football defensive back for the Louisville Kings of the United Football League (UFL). He played college football at LSU before he was drafted by the Denver Broncos in the seventh round of the 2021 NFL draft.

== Early life ==
Vincent grew up in Port Arthur, Texas and attended Memorial High School. As a senior, he was named first-team All-USA Texas after intercepting seven passes, four of which he returned for touchdowns.

== College career ==
As a true freshman, Vincent played in 11 games with nine tackles and one interception. He had 31 tackles, one sack, six passes deflected and one interception in his sophomore season. As a junior, he had 48 tackles with nine pass defended with four interceptions as LSU won the 2019 National Championship. Vincent announced that he would opt out of the 2020 season in order to prepare for the 2021 NFL draft.

Vincent is also a sprinter on the LSU track team. He competed at the 2019 NCAA Division I Outdoor Track and Field Championships in the 4 x 100-meter relay.

== Professional career ==
Pre-draft measurables
Height	Weight	Arm length	Hand span	Wingspan	40-yard dash	10-yard split	20-yard split	Vertical jump	Broad jump	Bench press
5 ft 9 3/4 in (1.77 m)	185 lb (84 kg)	30 1/4 in (0.77 m)	8 7/8 in (0.23 m)	6 ft 2 1/2 in (1.89 m)	4.38 s	1.59 s	2.52 s	35.5 in (0.90 m)	9 ft 9 in (2.97 m)	8 reps
All values from Pro Day

=== Denver Broncos ===
Vincent was drafted by the Denver Broncos in the seventh round, 237th overall, of the 2021 NFL Draft. On May 12, 2021, Vincent officially signed with the Broncos.

=== Philadelphia Eagles ===
On November 2, 2021, Vincent was traded to the Philadelphia Eagles in exchange for a sixth round pick in the 2022 NFL Draft.

On August 30, 2022 Vincent was released by the Eagles as part of final roster cuts.

=== San Francisco 49ers ===
On September 14, 2022, Vincent signed with the practice squad of the San Francisco 49ers. He was released on September 21.

=== San Antonio Brahmas (first stint) ===
On November 17, 2022, Vincent was drafted by the San Antonio Brahmas of the XFL.

=== Houston Roughnecks ===
On January 23, 2023, Vincent was traded to the Houston Roughnecks in exchange for wide receiver Darece Roberson Jr. He was released on April 10, 2023.

=== Toronto Argonauts ===
On February 15, 2024, it was announced that Vincent had signed with the Toronto Argonauts. He was released on May 28, 2024.

=== San Antonio Brahmas (second stint) ===
On May 19, 2025, Vincent signed with the San Antonio Brahmas.

=== Houston Gamblers ===
On January 13, 2026, Vincent was selected by the Houston Gamblers in the 2026 UFL Draft. He was named to the 2026 All-UFL Team.

=== Louisville Kings ===
On November 3, 2026, Vincent was traded to the Louisville Kings in exchange for Emory Jones.

== Personal life ==
Vincent's father, Kary Vincent, played college football at Texas A&M and in the Arena Football League. The elder Kary Vincent died in 2018.
