= Neil Morgan =

Neil or Neal Morgan may refer to:

- Neal Morgan (born 1979), musician
- Neal Morgan Jr. (1933 or 1934 – 2015), American writer and coach
- Neil Morgan (1924–2014), co-founder of Voice of San Diego and former editor of the San Diego Tribune
- Neil Morgan, a character in the 2012 TV British sitcom Cuckoo

== See also ==
- Niel Morgan (active 2006), owner of Ninfa's
