= Lakeview, Port Arthur, Texas =

Lakeview is an area of Port Arthur, Texas, United States that used to be a distinct unincorporated community in Jefferson County.

In 1929 residents successfully opposed Port Arthur's attempt to annex Lakeview. By 1980 Port Arthur had annexed Lakeview.

== Education ==
Lakeview is within the Port Arthur Independent School District.
