= Carl Larpenter =

American football player (1936–1998)

No. 77, 67
- Position: Guard / Offensive tackle

Personal information
- Born: July 1, 1936; Port Arthur, Texas
- Died: September 15, 1998 (aged 62)

Career information
- High school: Thomas Jefferson (Port Arthur, Texas)
- College: Texas

Career history
- Denver Broncos (1960–1961); Dallas Texans (1962)

Career statistics
- Games played: 30
- Stats at Pro Football Reference

Carl James Larpenter (July 1, 1936 – September 15, 1998) was a professional American football player for the American Football League's Denver Broncos (1960–1961) and Dallas Texans (1962). He was born in Port Arthur, Texas and attended the University of Texas. He was an offensive tackle and an offensive guard.

== See also ==
- Other American Football League players
