= Pear Ridge, Port Arthur, Texas =

Pear Ridge is an area of Port Arthur, Texas, United States that used to be a separate city in Jefferson County.

The city incorporated in 1935. By 1986, Port Arthur annexed of Pear Ridge.

== Education ==
Pear Ridge is within the Port Arthur Independent School District
