= Bishop Byrne High School =

Bishop Byrne High School may refer to:

- Bishop Byrne High School (Tennessee) - Memphis, Tennessee
- Bishop Byrne High School (Texas) - Port Arthur, Texas
