= Dane Strother =

American journalist

- Education: Louisiana State University
- Occupation: Political Consultant
- Political party: Democratic Party
- Website: www.strother-nuckels.com

Dane Strother is an American Democratic political strategist, media commentator, and former reporter who was part of the 1988 Pulitzer Prize-Winning staff at the Lawrence Eagle-Tribune.

== Career ==
Strother has helped elect officials in multiple states and countries. Strother has been the media strategist for U.S. Senator Mary Landrieu of Louisiana, Blanche Lincoln of Arkansas, Governor Roy Barnes of Georgia, Congressmen Lloyd Doggett, and has led media efforts for Rock the Vote that the Washington Post described as "bold."

Strother sits on the board of visitors of the Louisiana State University Manship School of Mass Communications. Earlier in life, Strother was the editor of LSU's The Daily Reveille and sued the university over first amendment rights and won. Strother's father, Raymond Strother is credited with having "practically invented the political consulting business."

== Personal life ==
Strother lives in Washington, D.C., Sacramento, California, and Montana.
