= Jonathan Babineaux =

American football player (born 1981)

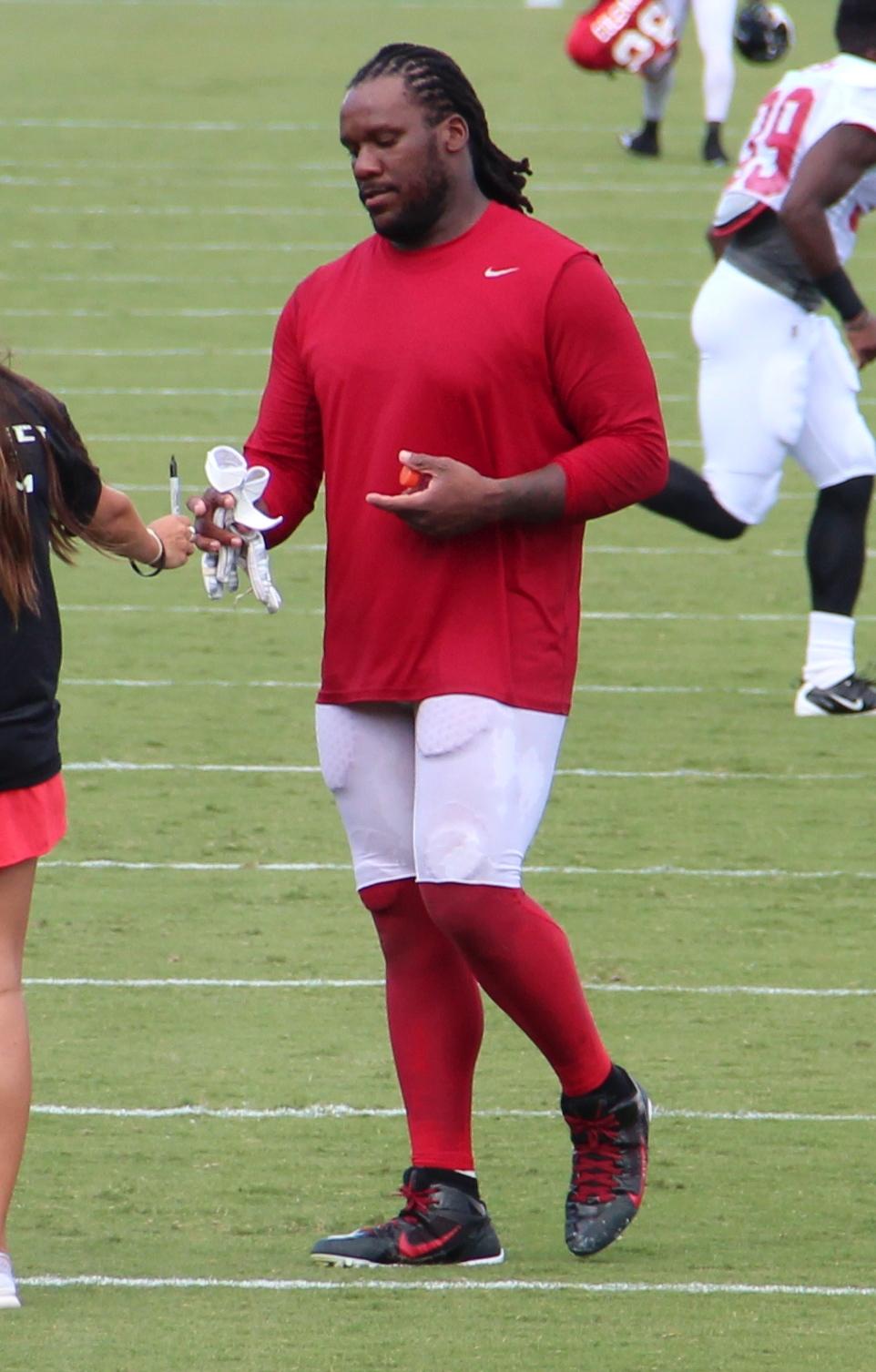
- Babineaux in 2016

No. 95
- Position: Defensive tackle

Personal information
- Born: October 12, 1981 (age 45); Port Arthur, Texas, U.S.
- Listed height: 6 ft 2 in (1.88 m)
- Listed weight: 300 lb (136 kg)

Career information
- High school: Abraham Lincoln (Port Arthur)
- College: Iowa
- NFL draft: 2005: 2nd round, 59th overall pick

Career history
- Atlanta Falcons (2005–2016)

Awards and highlights
- Third-team All-American (2004); First-team All-Big Ten (2004)

Career NFL statistics
- Total tackles: 394
- Sacks: 27
- Forced fumbles: 10
- Fumble recoveries: 10
- Interceptions: 4
- Defensive touchdowns: 2
- Stats at Pro Football Reference

Jonathan Joel Babineaux (born October 12, 1981) is an American former professional football player who played his entire 12-year career as a defensive tackle with the Atlanta Falcons of the National Football League (NFL). He played college football for the Iowa Hawkeyes and was selected by the Falcons in the second round of the 2005 NFL draft.

== Early life ==
Babineaux attended Lincoln High School in Port Arthur, Texas. In football, as a senior, he was the team captain of the Bumble Bees football team, and a first-team All-Conference linebacker. He also was an excellent punter, averaging 40 yards per punt. In basketball, he helped his team to be ranked the best in the state of Texas. He also participated in baseball, golf, and track and field.

== College career ==
Babineaux attended the University of Iowa where he played from 2000 to 2004. He finished his collegiate career with 131 tackles (39 for losses), 19 sacks, 24 quarterback hurries, one interception, two pass deflections, four fumble recoveries, and five forced fumbles.

== Professional career ==
Babineaux was selected by the Atlanta Falcons in the second round with the 59th overall pick of the 2005 NFL draft. On November 25, 2008, he signed a five-year contract extension with the Falcons. In 2009, he had nine tackles and 2.5 sacks against the Washington Redskins. He had a career-high six sacks in 2009, which led all NFL defensive tackles. In 2010, he posted 31 tackles, one interception, two forced fumbles, and one fumble recovery, which was returned for a touchdown against the Seattle Seahawks. In the 2011 season, he recorded 21 total tackles and one sack.

Babineaux started all 16 games in the 2012 season and recorded 3.5 sacks, 31 total tackles, and one interception. In the 2013 season, he recorded 42 total tackles and one sack. He signed a three-year, $9 million contract extension with the Falcons on March 11, 2014. In the 2014 season, he recorded 31 total tackles and two sacks. In the 2015 season, he recorded 30 total tackles, 1.5 sacks, and one interception. In the 2016 season, he recorded 22 total tackles.

At the end of the 2016 season, Babineaux and the Falcons reached Super Bowl LI, where they faced the New England Patriots on February 5, 2017. In the Super Bowl, he recorded one assisted tackle as the Falcons fell in a 34–28 overtime defeat. After the Super Bowl, Babineaux retired from the NFL after a 12-year career.

== NFL career statistics ==
Legend
	Led the league
**Bold**	Career high

=== Regular season ===
Year	Team	Games		Tackles					Interceptions					Fumbles			
Year	Team	GP	GS	Cmb	Solo	Ast	Sck	TFL	Int	Yds	TD	Lng	PD	FF	FR	Yds	TD
2005	ATL	**16**	6	31	24	7	0.5	5	0	0	0	0	1	0	1	0	0
2006	ATL	**16**	1	29	24	5	1.0	7	**1**	**6**	0	**6**	3	1	1	0	0
2007	ATL	14	9	45	**41**	4	3.0	6	0	0	0	0	**4**	**2**	1	11	0
2008	ATL	**16**	**16**	38	31	7	3.5	**14**	0	0	0	0	2	0	1	0	0
2009	ATL	**16**	**16**	**47**	37	10	**6.0**	13	0	0	0	0	2	**2**	**2**	0	0
2010	ATL	15	15	27	19	8	4.0	6	**1**	0	0	0	2	**2**	1	0	**1**
2011	ATL	13	13	21	12	9	1.0	5	0	0	0	0	2	0	0	0	0
2012	ATL	**16**	**16**	31	25	6	3.5	11	**1**	-2	0	-2	**4**	1	1	**15**	**1**
2013	ATL	**16**	**16**	42	28	14	1.0	7	0	0	0	0	0	1	**2**	8	0
2014	ATL	15	15	31	14	**17**	2.0	5	0	0	0	0	1	0	0	0	0
2015	ATL	**16**	4	30	22	8	1.5	9	**1**	-1	0	-1	2	1	0	0	0
2016	ATL	**16**	6	22	14	8	0.0	3	0	0	0	0	1	0	0	0	0
Career		185	133	394	291	103	27.0	91	4	3	0	6	24	10	10	34	2

=== Playoffs ===
Year	Team	Games		Tackles					Interceptions					Fumbles			
Year	Team	GP	GS	Cmb	Solo	Ast	Sck	TFL	Int	Yds	TD	Lng	PD	FF	FR	Yds	TD
2008	ATL	1	1	1	1	0	0.0	0	0	0	0	0	0	0	0	0	0
2010	ATL	1	1	3	0	**3**	0.5	0	0	0	0	0	0	0	0	0	0
2011	ATL	1	1	3	1	2	0.0	0	0	0	0	0	0	0	0	0	0
2012	ATL	2	**2**	**7**	**4**	**3**	**1.0**	1	0	0	0	0	0	0	**1**	0	0
2016	ATL	**3**	1	4	3	1	**1.0**	**2**	0	0	0	0	0	0	0	0	0
		8	6	18	9	9	2.5	3	0	0	0	0	0	0	1	0	0

== Personal life ==
Jonathan is the older brother of former Seattle Seahawks and Tennessee Titans safety Jordan Babineaux. Jonathan is also of Louisiana Creole descent.
