= Zachary Breaux =

American jazz guitarist

- Born: Zachary Charles Breaux; June 26, 1960; Port Arthur, Texas, U.S.
- Died: February 20, 1997 (aged 36) Miami Beach, Florida
- Genre: Jazz
- Occupation: Musician
- Instrument: Guitar
- Years active: 1969–1997
- Labels: NYC, Zebra

Zachary Charles Breaux (June 26, 1960 – February 20, 1997) was an American jazz guitarist who was influenced by George Benson and Wes Montgomery He played with Roy Ayers, Dee Dee Bridgewater, Donald Byrd, Stanley Turrentine, Jack McDuff, and Lonnie Liston Smith.

== Biography ==
Zachary Breaux was born on June 26, 1960, in Port Arthur, Texas. He began playing at the age of 9 and after graduating from Lincoln High School, he studied music composition at University of North Texas College of Music where he had been a member of the One O'Clock Lab Band. In 1984, he moved to New York, where he spent six years in the band of Roy Ayers. He was signed to Zebra Records in 1996 but died on February 20, 1997, at the age of 36 while on holiday in Miami Beach. He was trying to save the life of another swimmer, Eugenie Poleyeff, who was caught by a riptide. Breaux, who saved a man from drowning while on tour in Italy in 1988, was vacationing in Miami Beach with his family when he tried to help the swimmer. Breaux was caught by the current and suffered a heart attack. He was pronounced dead at the Miami Heart Institute. Poleyeff also died.

== Discography ==
=== As leader/co-leader ===
- Groovin' (NYC, 1992) (Groovin’ was recorded at Ronny Scott’s in London)
- Laid Back (NYC, 1994)
- Uptown Groove (Zebra, 1997)

=== As sideman ===
With Roy Ayers

- Vibesman (Live at Ronnie Scott's) (Music Club, 1995)
