= Raymond Strother =

American journalist (1940–2022)

- Born: October 18, 1940; Port Arthur, Texas, U.S.
- Died: October 1, 2022 (aged 81); Billings, Montana, U.S.
- Education: Northwestern State University; Louisiana State University
- Occupations: Political consultant Campaign manager for Gary Hart in U.S. presidential election, 1984
- Political party: Democratic
- Spouse: Sandy Peck Strother
- Children: Dane Strother; Kristan S. Trugman

Raymond D. Strother (October 18, 1940 – October 1, 2022) was a nationally known Democratic political consultant, originally from Port Arthur, Texas.

== Background ==
Reared in a politically active lower-middle-class home, Strother graduated in 1958 from Thomas Jefferson High School in Port Arthur, renamed in 2002 as Memorial High School. Strother won a track scholarship to Northwestern State University, then Northwestern State College, in Natchitoches, Louisiana. After two years, the administration asked him to leave NSC because of his political activities. He transferred to Louisiana State University in Baton Rouge. There he became the advertising director and then the editor of The Daily Reveille student newspaper. While in Baton Rouge to complete his Master of Arts degree in journalism, Strother was a night reporter and photographer for the Associated Press. His 1965 thesis at LSU correctly predicted that in the future the outcome of political campaigns would depend more on media coverage and advertising than on traditional political organization.

== Political life ==
Strother's first campaign management role was on behalf of the Democrat Mary Evelyn Parker, who was elected for the first time on February 6, 1968, as the Louisiana state treasurer in a lopsided race against the Republican candidate Allison Kolb. In time, Strother became a consultant to U.S. Senators Lloyd Bentsen of Texas, Russell B. Long, John Breaux and Mary Landrieu of Louisiana, John Stennis of Mississippi, Dennis DeConcini of Arizona, Gary Hart of Colorado, Blanche Lincoln of Arkansas, Al Gore of Tennessee, and many others. He worked for gubernatorial candidates Bill Clinton of Arkansas, John McKeithen, Edwin Edwards, and Buddy Roemer of Louisiana, Mark Wells White of Texas, Bill O'Neil of Connecticut, Rudy Perpich of Minnesota, and Roy Barnes of Georgia.

In 1984 and 1988, he supervised the media campaign for Gary Hart's presidential bids, but Hart was eliminated by Walter Mondale and Michael Dukakis. Strother then worked on the Super Tuesday states in 1988 for Al Gore, who ran well only in parts of the American South.

Strother garnered awards for his documentaries about Senator Bentsen, a former U.S. representative and later the Clinton administration Secretary of the Treasury, and U.S. Representative John Lewis of Georgia, a figure in the civil rights movement.

Strother was named to the LSU Journalism Hall of Fame, the American Association of Political Consultants Hall of Fame, and, in 2013, to the Louisiana Political Museum and Hall of Fame in Winnfield, located some thirty miles east of Natchitoches, where his college education had begun in 1958. Strother was a former president and chairman of the board of the American Association of Political Consultants. In 1999, he was a resident fellow at the Institute of Politics at Harvard University in Cambridge, Massachusetts. In 2008 he was named a fellow at the Robert J. Dole Institute of Politics at the University of Kansas. He also served on the Board of Visitors of the LSU College of Journalism.

A new national award named "The Strother" in his honor was instituted in his honor during 2002 at the University of Akron where he was named an honorary fellow. The designation recognizes political professionals with an "exemplary record of achievement" in the field itself as well as promoting their expertise in higher education. Northwestern State University awarded him a Doctorate of Humane Letters. An exhibit depicting his life was installed in the Hall of Notable People at the Museum of the Gulf Coast in Port Arthur, Texas.

External videos
- Presentation by Strother on Falling Up, April 10, 2003, C-SPAN
- Booknotes interview with Strother on Falling Up, June 1, 2003, C-SPAN

In 1991, Strother penned a novel, Cottonwood, the story of a dishonest political consultant. His 2005 autobiography is entitled Falling Up, How a Redneck Helped Invent Political Consulting.

In 2000, Strother was an analyst on the Public Broadcasting Service for the Cheney-Lieberman vice presidential debate. He wrote essays for the Atlanta Constitution, The New York Times, Newsweek, and the Washington Post. Campaigns and Elections magazine called Strother "the poet of democracy."

== Personal life ==
Strother was married to the former Sandy Peck, also a native of Port Arthur. They had two children who live in the Washington, D.C. area, Dane Strother and Kristan S. Trugman. The Strothers resided in Bozeman and had a home on the Big Hole River near the unincorporated community of Wise River in Beaverhead County near Dillon, Montana. Strother died from cancer in Billings on October 1, 2022, at the age of 81.
