= Danny Gorrer =

American football player (born 1986)

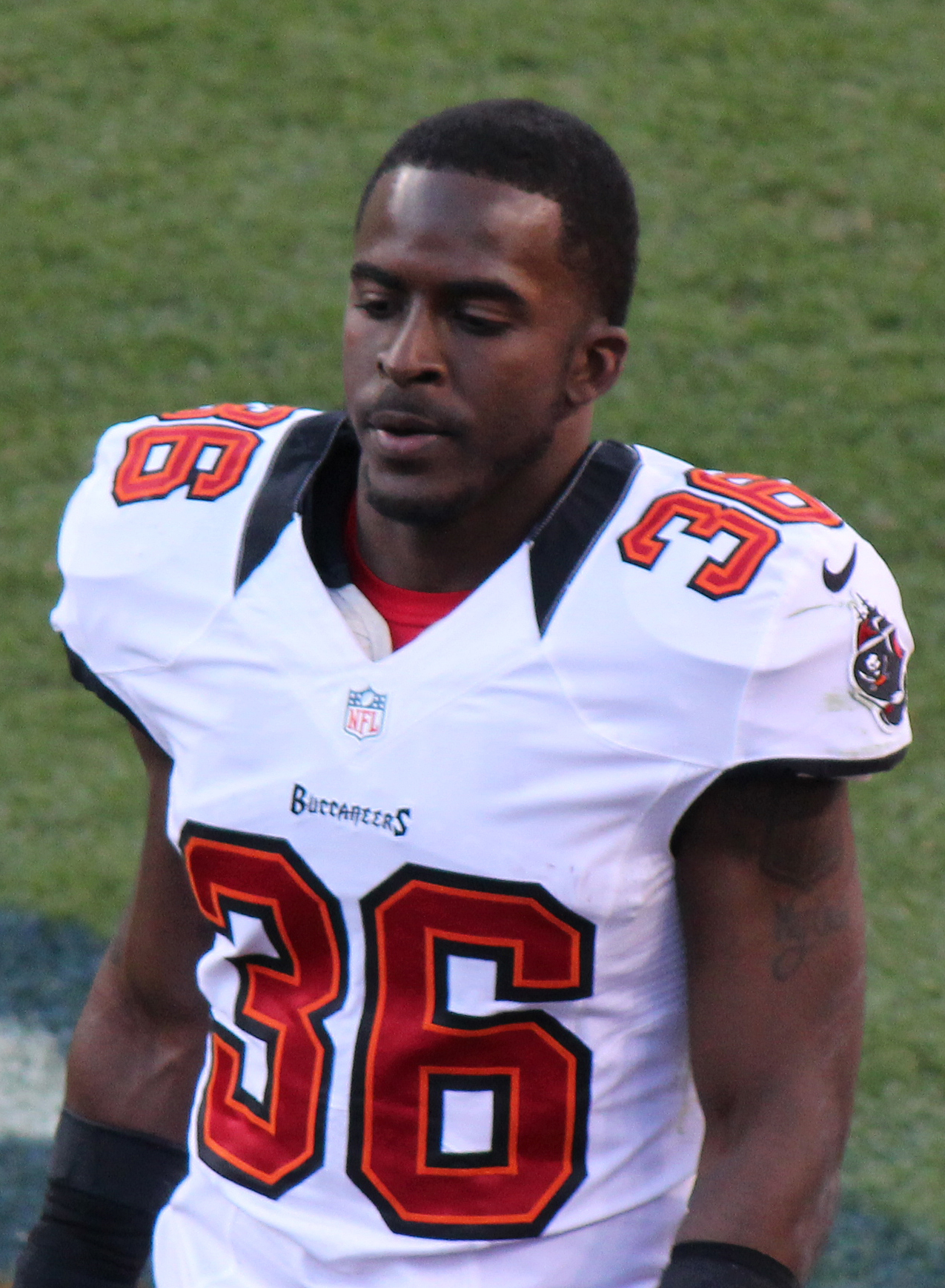
- Gorrer with the Tampa Bay Buccaneers in 2012

No. 25, 36, 37
- Position: Cornerback

Personal information
- Born: June 1, 1986 (age 40); Port Arthur, Texas, U.S.
- Listed height: 6 ft 0 in (1.83 m)
- Listed weight: 173 lb (78 kg)

Career information
- High school: Memorial (Port Arthur)
- College: Texas A&M
- NFL draft: 2009: undrafted

Career history
- New Orleans Saints (2009)*; St. Louis Rams (2009); New Orleans Saints (2010)*; Baltimore Ravens (2010–2011); Seattle Seahawks (2012); Tampa Bay Buccaneers (2012–2013); Detroit Lions (2014); Baltimore Ravens (2014)
- * Offseason or practice squad member only

Career NFL statistics
- Total tackles: 55
- Forced fumbles: 1
- Pass deflections: 11
- Interceptions: 2
- Stats at Pro Football Reference

Danny Gorrer (born June 1, 1986) is an American former professional football player who was a cornerback in the National Football League (NFL). He was signed by the New Orleans Saints as an undrafted free agent in 2009. He played college football for the Texas A&M Aggies. Gorrer was also a member of the St. Louis Rams, Baltimore Ravens, Seattle Seahawks, Tampa Bay Buccaneers, and Detroit Lions.

== Early life ==
He starred at Memorial High School in Port Arthur, Texas, where he recorded 68 tackles, 9 interceptions and 2 touchdowns as a senior and was selected to the Associated Press All-State second-team. Was named first-team All-Greater Houston Area, first-team Port Arthur News Super Teams, first-team Beaumont Enterprise Super Gold Team, and first-team All-District. Won the 2003 5A state championship 4x400-meter relay as a senior and finished second in the state his junior and senior year in the 4x100-meter relay. Gorrer was a high school teammate, and is a life long friend of fellow NFL player, Jamaal Charles.

== College career ==
A two-year starter at Texas A&M, Gorrer started 24 of the 42 games he played for the Aggies, tallying 141 tackles, two sacks, an interception, 13 pass defenses and two forced fumbles. He appeared in 11 games as senior, starting 4 of them and making 29 tackles. Started his first seven games and made 30 tackles as junior before injuring his knee. Had his best collegiate season as a sophomore, notching 52 tackles, an interception, and starting all 13 games. Saw action in all 11 games (4 starts) as a redshirt freshman, posting 30 tackles. Redshirted as a true freshman in 2004. Graduated with a degree in agricultural leadership and development in December 2008.

== Professional career ==
Pre-draft measurables
Height	Weight	40-yard dash	10-yard split	20-yard split	Three-cone drill	Vertical jump	Broad jump
5 ft 11 5/8 in (1.82 m)	185 lb (84 kg)	4.40 s	1.50 s	2.53 s	6.90 s	35 1/2 in (0.90 m)	9 ft 5 in (2.87 m)
Weight from NFL Combine, all others from Texas A&M Pro Day.

=== New Orleans Saints (first stint) ===
Gorrer was signed as an undrafted free agent by the New Orleans Saints in the 2009 offseason. He was released, however.

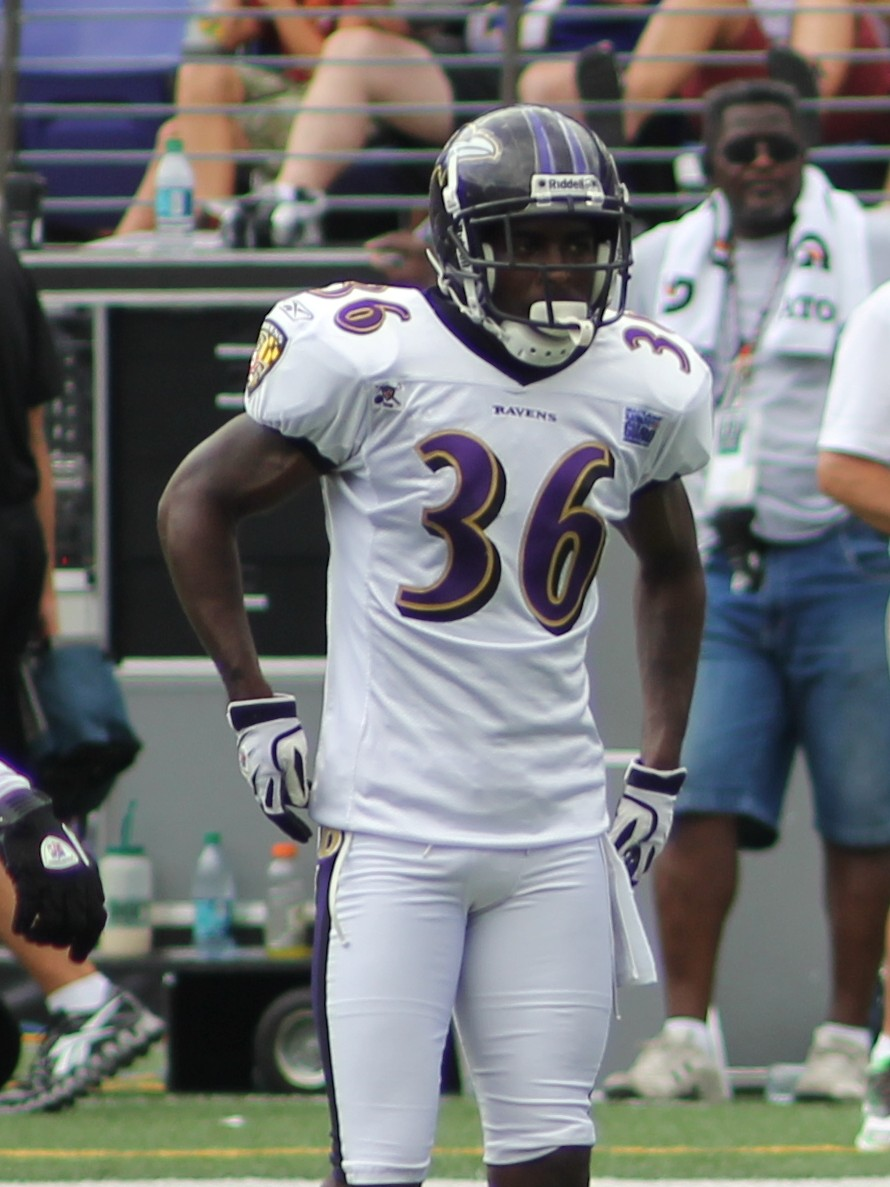
Gorrer with the Ravens in 2011

=== St. Louis Rams ===
Gorrer was claimed off waivers by the St. Louis Rams in 2009. He started one game for St. Louis in the 2009 NFL season and recorded five tackles on the year. But that would be his only season playing for the Rams. Gorrer was cut shortly afterward.

=== New Orleans Saints (second stint) ===
New Orleans re-claimed Gorrer in June 2010 after he was waived by the Rams. The Saints waived him on August 24, 2010.

=== Baltimore Ravens (first stint) ===
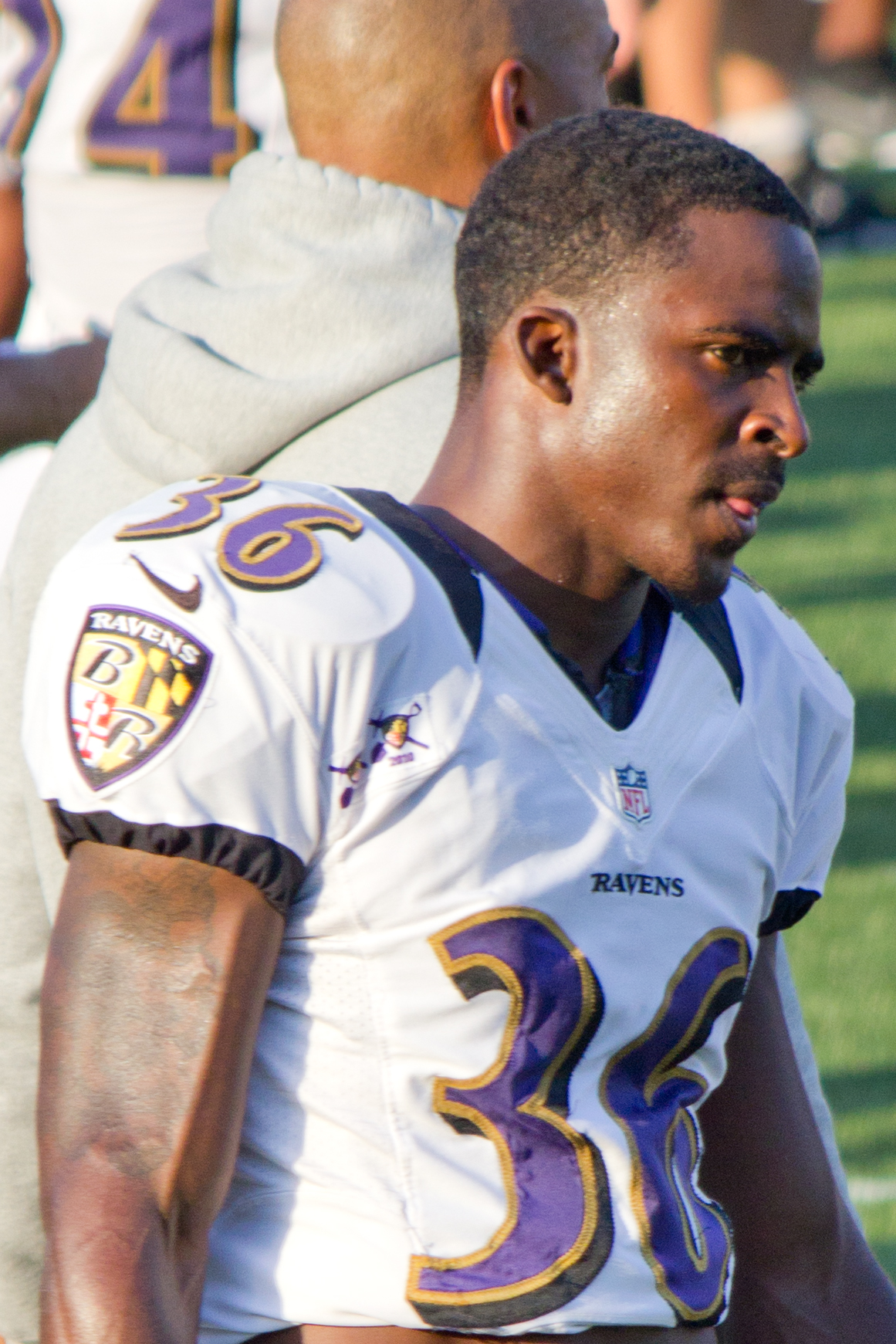
Gorrer during Ravens practice at Navy–Marine Corps Memorial Stadium, August 2012.

He was signed to the Baltimore Ravens' practice squad on September 23, 2010. He was released on October 7, but was re-signed on October 8. On September 17, 2011, Gorrer was moved to the Ravens' active roster. He saw a fair amount of playing time in a Sunday Night Football win over the New York Jets, shutting down former Super Bowl MVP Santonio Holmes for much of the game. However, the Ravens released Gorrer prior to the start of the 2012 season.

=== Seattle Seahawks ===
On September 18, 2012, he was signed by the Seattle Seahawks, who subsequently waived him on October 30, 2012. He received no playing time while with the team.

=== Tampa Bay Buccaneers ===
On October 31, 2012, the Tampa Bay Buccaneers claimed Gorrer off waivers. He was released on August 27, 2014.

=== Detroit Lions ===
On September 16, 2014, the Detroit Lions signed Gorrer to bolster a secondary depleted by injuries. He was waived on November 3, 2014.

=== Baltimore Ravens (second stint) ===
Gorrer was signed off waivers by the Ravens on November 4, 2014. In his first game back to the Ravens, Gorrer picked off a pass from Titans QB Zach Mettenberger.
