= Nelson R. Strong =

American politician

1st Mayor of Port Arthur
- In office May 1898 – September 1899
- Preceded by: office established
- Succeeded by: Charles Eugene Smith

Member of the Texas House of Representatives from the 55th district
- In office January 8, 1929 – February 26, 1930
- Preceded by: Robert Milton Johnson
- Succeeded by: Cora Gray Strong

Personal details
- Born: February 11, 1862 Illinois
- Died: February 26, 1930 (aged 68) Palestine, Texas
- Party: Democratic
- Spouse: Cora Gray Strong

Nelson "Nat" R. Strong (February 11, 1862 – February 26, 1930) was an American politician.

Strong was born on February 11, 1862, in Illinois and later arrived in Port Arthur, Texas, in 1896 where he served as a founding developer, became its first postmaster, and the first mayor of Port Arthur, between 1898 and 1899.

== Personal life ==
He married Cora Gray Strong in 1905, and the couple settled in her hometown of Slocum, Texas.

== Political career ==
Strong was elected as Port Arthur's first mayor upon the town's incorporation in May 1898. Incidentally as recalled by early Port Arthur dignitaries, Strong was declared the winner by one vote in the final tabulation after an error that occurred when R.H. Woodworth, who later became the city's third mayor, accidentally dropped a cashier check instead of his ballot into the voting box. Strong resigned as mayor in September 1899.

Nelson Strong was elected to Texas House of Representatives in 1928, and held the District 55 seat as a Democrat from 8 January 1929 until his death on 26 February 1930. Strong's wife succeeded him as a state representative.

== See also ==
- List of mayors of Port Arthur, Texas
