= Bob Hope School =

Charter school in Port Arthur, Texas, United States

Coordinates: 29.9325°N 93.9372°W

Bob Hope School is a charter school system in Port Arthur, Texas, United States. It has six campuses: Bob Hope Elementary Campus, Bob Hope Middle School, Bob Hope High School, Bob Hope School in Beaumont, Bob Hope School in Baytown, and Bob Hope School in Cypress, Texas.

In November 2007 the Texas State Board of Education approved the school's establishment. The school, focusing on career preparation, was to be initially housed in two buildings which had a total of 40,000 square feet (3,700 m^{2}) of space: the Hebert Building and the Hope Building. The school planned to have all classes move to the Hughen Building, which has 20,000 square feet (1,900 m^{2}) of space. Its initial student capacity was to be 250.

By 2010 there were plans to expand the capacity by 250 students.
