= Jordan Babineaux =

American football player (born 1982)

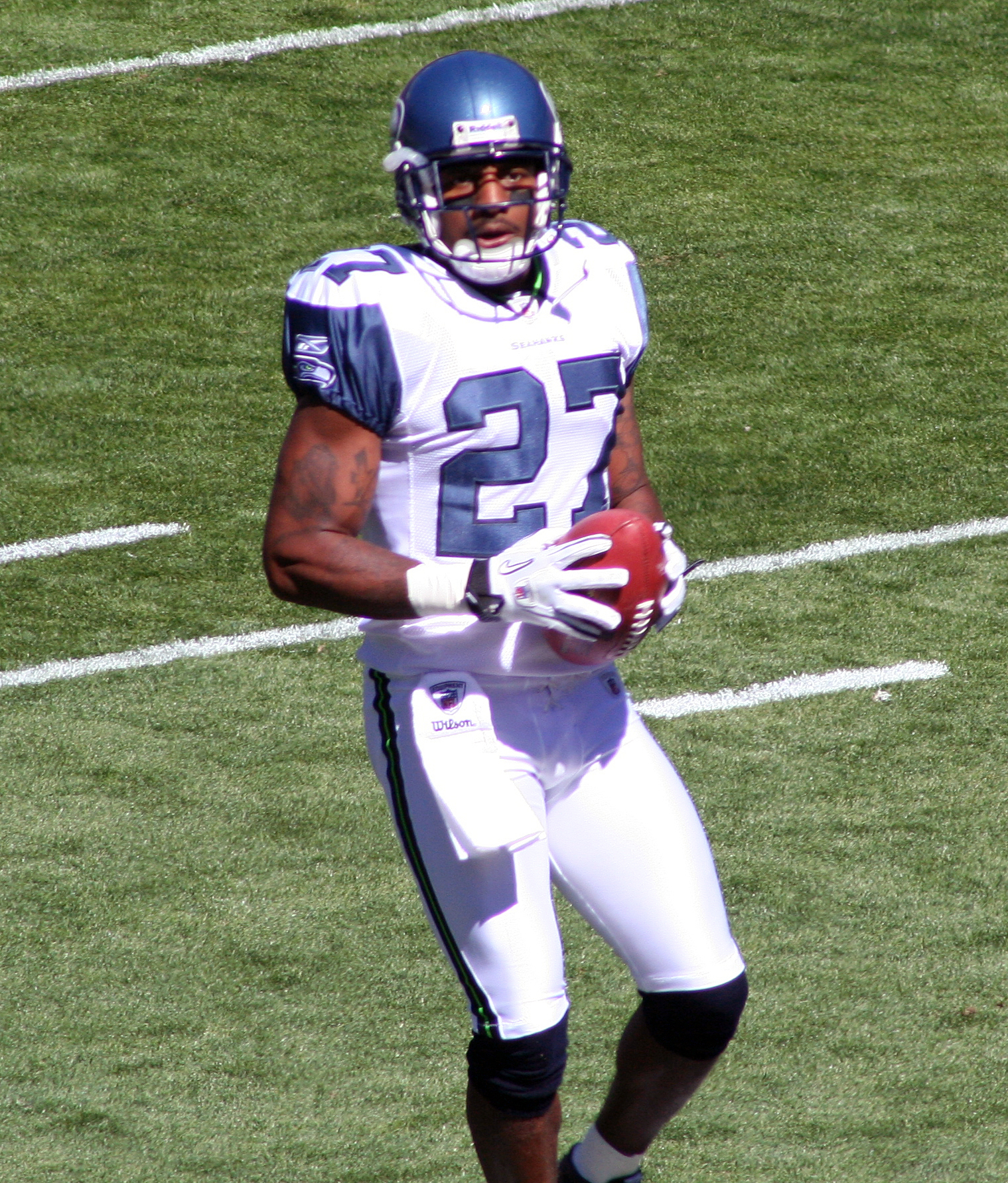
- Babineaux with the Seattle Seahawks in 2010

No. 27, 26
- Position: Safety

Personal information
- Born: August 31, 1982 (age 44); Port Arthur, Texas, U.S.
- Listed height: 6 ft 0 in (1.83 m)
- Listed weight: 210 lb (95 kg)

Career information
- High school: Abraham Lincoln (Port Arthur)
- College: Southern Arkansas
- NFL draft: 2004: undrafted

Career history
- Seattle Seahawks (2004–2010); Tennessee Titans (2011–2012)

Career NFL statistics
- Total tackles: 600
- Sacks: 4
- Forced fumbles: 8
- Fumble recoveries: 4
- Interceptions: 12
- Defensive touchdowns: 3
- Stats at Pro Football Reference

Jordan Jude Babineaux (born August 31, 1982) is an American former professional football player who was a safety in the National Football League (NFL). He played college football for the Southern Arkansas Muleriders and was signed by the Seattle Seahawks as an undrafted free agent in 2004.

Babineaux is most notable for his game-saving effort in the 2006 NFC Wild Card game when he tackled Dallas Cowboys quarterback Tony Romo on a fourth down scramble just short of the first-down marker after Romo fumbled the snap for what might have been a game-winning field goal for the Cowboys. He also intercepted a Drew Bledsoe pass against the Cowboys in 2005 with three seconds remaining, allowing his kicker to kick the game-winning field goal as time expired.

== College career ==
Babineaux was Dopke.com's National Special Teams Performer of the Year, was a second-team selection on the D2Football.com All-America team, was a first-team All-South Region pick on defense, and was a first-team All-GSC defensive back. He tied two NCAA Division II records, set two GSC records and tied another, and set two school records for Southern Arkansas University.

== Professional career ==
=== Seattle Seahawks ===
Babineaux was signed as an undrafted free agent on April 29, 2004. He was a member of the practice squad following training camp, and signed to the active roster on November 26, 2004. In Seattle, he was known as "Big Play Babs". He earned this nickname after a game-changing interception against the Dallas Cowboys on October 23, 2005. He intercepted a pass by quarterback Drew Bledsoe and returned the ball to the Cowboys' 32 yard-line with five seconds left in the game, setting up a game-winning Josh Brown field goal.

On January 6, 2007, late in the final quarter of the wild-card round game against the Dallas Cowboys during the 2006–07 NFL playoffs, the Cowboys attempted a 19-yard field goal. Babineaux made a diving, game-saving ankle tackle of Dallas quarterback and place kick holder Tony Romo, who was scrambling to the end zone with the football after bobbling the snap for what might have been a winning field goal. The tackle stopped Romo inches short of a first down, and about a yard shy of a touchdown. As a result, Seattle took possession on downs and won the game by a score of 21–20 and advanced to the divisional round.

In September 2007, Babineaux signed a five-year extension to remain with the Seahawks. The deal was worth an aggregate value of between $10-$17 million. While he could have tested the free agent market, Babineaux's loyalty to the Seahawks organization and the fans of Seattle, along with his desire to lead the Seahawks back to the Super Bowl, were all factors in keeping the versatile defensive back in Seattle. During the 2008 NFC Wild Card Game against the Redskins, he made an interception and returned it 57 yards for a touchdown which secured a win for the Seahawks. Babineaux used his versatility to play cornerback, safety, and special teams.

Babineaux was suspended for the first game of the 2008 season for violating the league's substance abuse policy. The Seahawks opened the season away at Buffalo, losing 34–10. In 2009, Babineaux became the starting free safety after Brian Russell was released and subsequently signed in Jacksonville. In 2010, Earl Thomas became the starting free safety, forcing Babineaux to go back to a backup role. He mainly played in the nickel and dime defense as a cornerback. One of the Seahawks' formations (the "Nickel Babs") was named after him. He also was a key special team player. He finished the season with 46 tackles, 1.5 sacks, a forced fumbled, and two interceptions. He also scored a safety, the first of his career.

=== Tennessee Titans ===
Babineaux signed with the Tennessee Titans on August 4, 2011. On October 2, 2011, in a game against the Cleveland Browns, Babineaux picked off Colt McCoy and returned the interception 97 yards for a touchdown. He re-signed with the Titans in March 2012, this time for a two-year deal worth up to $5 million. Babineaux was released by the Titans on March 12, 2013.

Babineaux retired from the NFL after the 2014 season. He did the Pregame and Postgame Seahawk show for 710 ESPN Seattle during the 2015 season.

== NFL career statistics ==
Legend
	Led the league
**Bold**	Career high

=== Regular season ===
Year	Team	Games		Tackles					Interceptions					Fumbles			
Year	Team	GP	GS	Cmb	Solo	Ast	Sck	TFL	Int	Yds	TD	Lng	PD	FF	FR	Yds	TD
2004	SEA	6	0	8	7	1	0.0	0	0	0	0	0	0	0	0	0	0
2005	SEA	**16**	4	75	62	13	0.0	3	**3**	56	0	25	**8**	1	**1**	0	0
2006	SEA	15	8	55	43	12	0.0	0	1	20	0	20	4	0	0	0	0
2007	SEA	**16**	0	63	52	11	1.0	1	1	0	0	0	3	**3**	**1**	0	0
2008	SEA	14	1	60	57	3	0.0	1	1	35	**1**	35	3	1	**1**	**24**	**1**
2009	SEA	**16**	**16**	**104**	**75**	29	**1.5**	3	2	18	0	18	6	1	0	0	0
2010	SEA	**16**	0	46	37	9	**1.5**	**4**	2	37	0	20	**8**	1	0	0	0
2011	TEN	**16**	14	93	72	21	0.0	2	1	**97**	**1**	**97**	7	1	**1**	0	0
2012	TEN	**16**	12	96	66	**30**	0.0	0	1	10	0	10	7	0	0	0	0
		131	55	600	471	129	4.0	14	12	273	2	97	46	8	4	24	1

=== Playoffs ===
Year	Team	Games		Tackles					Interceptions					Fumbles			
Year	Team	GP	GS	Cmb	Solo	Ast	Sck	TFL	Int	Yds	TD	Lng	PD	FF	FR	Yds	TD
2004	SEA	1	0	3	3	0	0.0	0	0	0	0	0	0	0	0	0	0
2005	SEA	**3**	1	**9**	7	2	0.0	0	0	0	0	0	**1**	0	0	0	0
2006	SEA	2	**2**	**9**	**8**	1	0.0	0	0	0	0	0	**1**	0	0	0	0
2007	SEA	2	1	**9**	6	3	0.0	0	**1**	**57**	**1**	**57**	**1**	0	**1**	0	0
2010	SEA	2	0	8	3	**5**	0.0	0	0	0	0	0	**1**	0	0	0	0
		10	4	38	27	11	0.0	0	1	57	1	57	4	0	1	0	0

== Personal life ==
Jordan is the younger brother of former Atlanta Falcons defensive tackle Jonathan Babineaux and has a daughter, Jaida. Jordan is also of Louisiana Creole descent.
