= Stephen F. Austin High School (Port Arthur, Texas) =

High school in Port Arthur, Texas, United States

Coordinates: 29.9000°N 94.0178°W

Stephen F. Austin High School was a senior high school in Port Arthur, Texas and a part of the Port Arthur Independent School District.

In 2002 it merged into Memorial High School.
