= Neal Morgan Jr. =

American author and football coach (died 2015)

Neal Morgan (born Lowell O'Neal Morgan Jr., 1933 or 1934 – May 28, 2015) was an author, columnist, coach of college and high school football, Democratic political activist and academic administrator. Morgan published two books during his lifetime, Play It from The Heart (published June 1, 1999), and Karankawa County: Short Stories from a Corner of Texas (published October 1, 2001). Morgan spent 12 years contributing a weekly column on politics and life to The Port Arthur News, a local newspaper in Port Arthur, Texas. Morgan had a long and manifold coaching career. After a four-year stint as head coach of the Bulldogs at Nederland High School (1972–75), Morgan coached at Howard College in Big Spring, Trinity University in San Antonio, and Sam Houston State University in Huntsville. His first head coaching assignment was at Old Lutcher Stark in Orange. During his time in Orange he gave Wade Phillips his first job in coaching by hiring him as his rookie defensive coordinator. When Morgan noticed the trend of the top athletes going to West Orange, he joined the coaching staff at the University of North Texas in Denton. Morgan has also published multiple articles in The Texas Observer and Texas Monthly magazine.
