= Cora Gray Strong =

American politician (1882–1959)

Cora Gray Strong (4 September 1882 – 21 March 1959) was an American politician.

Cora Gray was born in Elkhart, Texas, on 4 September 1882. Gray attended the Summer Hill Select School for Young Women, and became a teacher. She taught in Anderson County for one year, at Day, then moved to Bethel for another year-long teaching position. Gray then relocated to Dallas, to enroll at the Metropolitan Business College. After graduating, Gray was employed by the Dallas-based Briggs Machinery Supply Company.

She married Nelson R. Strong in 1905, and moved with him to Slocum, Texas. In Slocum, Gray acquired and operated a store formerly owned by her father, and additionally served the city as an assistant postmaster for two decades.

Her husband was elected to serve District 55 of the Texas House of Representatives in 1928, and died in office on 26 February 1930. Gray succeeded him on 13 January 1931. During the first session of her tenure as a state representative, Gray helped pass a law regarding administration and oversight of rural schools, and jointly proposed a successful amendment to the Constitution of Texas. With its passage, Gray became the first woman state representative in Texas to propose a successful state constitutional amendment related to tax collection. In the second legislative session of her term, Gray advocated for a bill regarding freshwater fishing and fish selling. Gray did not run for a full term in her own right, and left office on 10 January 1933, choosing to return to her farming operation in Slocum. Gray was later named an alternate delegate to the 1944 Democratic National Convention. She died on 21 March 1959.
