= Lucian Adams =

US Army recipient of the Medal of Honor (1922–2003)

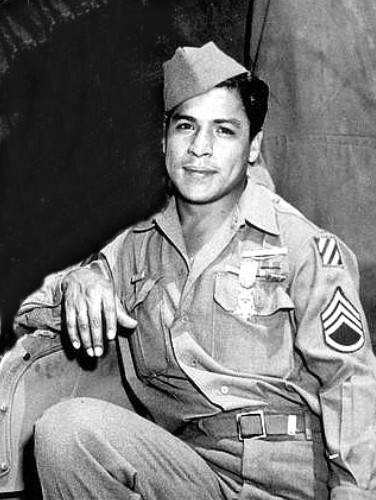
- Born: October 26, 1922; Port Arthur, Texas, U.S.
- Died: March 31, 2003 (aged 80); San Antonio, Texas, U.S.
- Burial place: Fort Sam Houston National Cemetery, San Antonio, Texas, U.S.
- Military career
- Allegiance: United States
- Branch: United States Army
- Service years: 1943–1945
- Rank: Staff Sergeant
- Units: 3rd Battalion, 30th Infantry Regiment, 3rd Infantry Division
- Conflicts: World War II: Italian Campaign; Battle of Anzio; Western Front; Operation Dragoon
- Awards: Medal of Honor; Bronze Star; Purple Heart
- Other work: Veterans Administration

Lucian Adams (October 26, 1922 – March 31, 2003) was a United States Army soldier during World War II who received the Medal of Honor for single-handedly destroying enemy machine gun emplacements to re-establish supply lines to U.S. Army companies. He also received the Bronze Star and Purple Heart for his heroic actions in Italy.

== Early life and education ==
Adams was born on October 26, 1922, in Port Arthur, Texas, as one of twelve children (nine brothers and three sisters) in a large Mexican-American family. He attended Port Arthur High School and enlisted in the Army in February 1943, after spending two years in a wartime plant making landing craft — just like the ones that would carry him to the shores of Italy and then France in the U.S. invasion of Europe.

== Career ==
In the summer of 1944, the 3rd Infantry Division landed near St Tropez in the South of France and began advancing into central France. By late October, Adam's company was near the town of Saint-Die in the Mortagne forest, moving down a country road to open a supply line to two assault companies of his battalion that were cut off by the Germans. When stopped by heavy enemy fire, Adams was sent forward to scout the German position and reported three enemy machine-gun nests to his company commander. He was then told "You go on out there and make a breakthrough to get those GIs".

Carrying a borrowed Browning Automatic Rifle (BAR), Adams began walking with his men down the road, which was heavily wooded on both sides. They had advanced just ten yards before the German machine guns opened fire, killing three men immediately and wounding six others. The rest of the men except Adams took cover. Adams pressed forward moving from tree to tree straight through enemy fire to kill the first gunner with a grenade. When another German popped up from a foxhole a few yards away, Adams killed him with fire from the BAR. Charging into the fire of the second machine gun, he killed its gunner with another grenade and forced its two supporting infantrymen to surrender. He then ran deeper into the woods; killing five more Germans. He then began taking fire from the third machine gunner who missed his mark; Adams didn't. He killed the gunner, and by the time Adams finished his one-man rampage, he had cleared the woods of enemy soldiers. Adams' men began calling him the Tornado from Texas.

After the action Adams was told by messenger that he was recommended for the Medal of Honor. Since he had heard the same thing at Anzio, Italy when he single-handedly destroyed a German machine gun position, he did not pay too much attention and continued on with his unit fighting their way into Germany. In the spring of 1945, Adams received orders to go home to be awarded the Medal of Honor by President Franklin D. Roosevelt. Before he left however, President Roosevelt died.

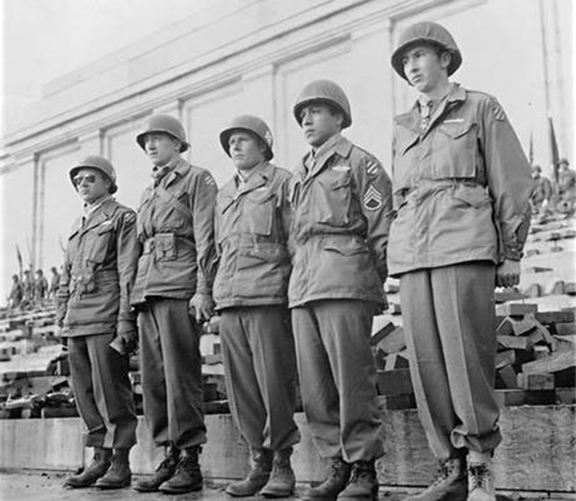
3rd Division soldiers receiving the Medal of Honor, Adams second from right

Adams received the medal from Lieutenant General Alexander Patch on April 23, 1945, in Nuremberg's Zeppelin Stadium. A U.S. flag was draped over a huge swastika on the top of the stadium. After the ceremony, U.S. engineers removed the flag and blew up the swastika. After serving in the European Theatre during World War II, he returned to Texas where he worked for the Veterans Administration for over 40 years before retiring in 1986.

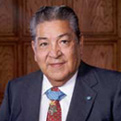
Adams postwar

Adams died on March 31, 2003, in San Antonio, Texas; he is buried in the Fort Sam Houston National Cemetery in San Antonio.

The Staff Sergeant Lucian Adams Elementary School in Port Arthur is named after Adams

== Medal of Honor citation ==
While serving with the 30th Infantry, 3rd Infantry Division, in France, SSgt Adams' company was attempting to open supply lines; he single-handedly eliminated the enemy positions. His citation reads:

For conspicuous gallantry and intrepidity at risk of life above and beyond the call of duty on 28 October 1944, near St. Die, France. When his company was stopped in its effort to drive through the Mortagne Forest to reopen the supply line to the isolated third battalion, S/Sgt. Adams braved the concentrated fire of machineguns in a lone assault on a force of German troops. Although his company had progressed less than 10 yards and had lost 3 killed and 6 wounded, S/Sgt. Adams charged forward dodging from tree to tree firing a borrowed BAR from the hip. Despite intense machinegun fire which the enemy directed at him and rifle grenades which struck the trees over his head showering him with broken twigs and branches, S/Sgt. Adams made his way to within 10 yards of the closest machinegun and killed the gunner with a hand grenade. An enemy soldier threw hand grenades at him from a position only 10 yards distant; however, S/Sgt. Adams dispatched him with a single burst of BAR fire. Charging into the vortex of the enemy fire, he killed another machinegunner at 15 yards range with a hand grenade and forced the surrender of 2 supporting infantrymen. Although the remainder of the German group concentrated the full force of its automatic weapons fire in a desperate effort to knock him out, he proceeded through the woods to find and exterminate 5 more of the enemy. Finally, when the third German machinegun opened up on him at a range of 20 yards, S/Sgt. Adams killed the gunner with BAR fire. In the course of the action, he personally killed 9 Germans, eliminated 3 enemy machineguns, vanquished a specialized force which was armed with automatic weapons and grenade launchers, cleared the woods of hostile elements, and reopened the severed supply lines to the assault companies of his battalion.

He was awarded the Medal of Honor on March 29, 1945.

== Awards and recognitions ==
Among Lucian Adams' decorations and medals were the following:

Combat Infantryman Badge
Medal of Honor
Bronze Star Medal	Purple Heart	Army Good Conduct Medal
American Campaign Medal	European-African-Middle Eastern Campaign Medal	World War II Victory Medal

2 Overseas Service Bars
1 Service stripe

== See also ==
- List of Medal of Honor recipients
- List of Medal of Honor recipients for World War II
- List of Hispanic Medal of Honor recipients
- Hispanic Americans in World War II
