= The Reveille (newspaper) =

Louisiana State University student-run newspaper

- Type: Student newspaper
- Editor-in-chief: Jason Willis
- Managing editor: Olivia Tomlinson
- News editor: Courtney Bell
- Opinion editor: Garrett McEntee
- Entertainment Editor: Lexie Ware
- Founded: 1887; 139 years ago
- Headquarters: Baton Rouge, Louisiana, United States
- Website: lsureveille.com

The Reveille, formerly the Daily Reveille, has been the student newspaper at Louisiana State University in Baton Rouge, Louisiana since 1887. It prints twice a week on Mondays and Thursdays during the fall and spring semesters, and once a week on Monday in the summer. It publishes online content daily at LSUReveille.com. The Reveille has a weekly circulation of about 6,000 copies.

== History ==
The earliest known issue of the Reveille was published at Louisiana State University in 1887, but did not become a permanent part of campus until January 14, 1897, when it began weekly publication; in the 1920s it began publishing twice a week. By the 1930s it was publishing five days a week. In 1934, then-U.S. Senator Huey Long had seven staff members expelled for publishing an anti-Long letter to the editor and refusing to accept faculty censorship. The students, now commonly referred to as the "Reveille Seven," were Carl Corbin, Samuel Montague, Stan Shlosman, Cal Abraham, Jesse Cutrer, L. Rea Godbold, and David McGuire.

The publication became the Daily Reveille in 1938, only to be forced back to twice-a-week status during World War II. It resumed daily publication again in 1947 but dropped back to four issues a week in 1951 when the Korean War caused LSU enrollment to slump to just over 5,000 students. The paper returned to five-day-a-week publication in 2002. The Daily Reveille underwent a rebrand in 2017, and now publishes print newspaper editions semi-weekly, with a heightened focus on its digital presence.

The Reveille boasts prestigious alumni, including E.J. Ourso, for whom LSU's College of Business is named, the political consultant Raymond Strother, political journalist and author John Maginnis, and Robert E. Pierre, a staff writer at The Washington Post. The Daily Reveille's history also includes stories that have had a great impact on LSU's campus, including a series of stories that resulted in the resignation of an LSU chancellor.

In 2003 the publication earned titles such as Best Newspaper on both state and regional levels. Its community-focused efforts earned the paper a 2003 Associated Collegiate Press National Pacemaker Award, the highest award granted to student publications. The Daily Reveille won the Editor & Publisher EPPY Award in 2008 for best college newspaper website. Princeton Review named the Daily Reveille as the tenth-best college newspaper in the nation in its 2010 edition of the "Best 361 Colleges."

In 2015, LSU Libraries began a $100,000 project to create digital scans of the entire archives of the Daily Reveille to make them more accessible and searchable. Instead of scanning from microfilm copies of the paper, LSU intends to scan each issue from print, creating new, higher-quality microfilm copies.

== Printing and distribution ==
The Daily Reveille is printed by Baton Rouge Press in Baton Rouge, Louisiana, and was formerly printed by Signature Offset in Hattiesburg, Mississippi. The paper is delivered to campus every Wednesday morning and is available at 86 locations on campus and in the surrounding area.

Stories, columns and other content from the Daily Reveille also appear at LSUReveille.com, the newspaper's website. Student journalists use the website to update readers on breaking news during holidays and semester breaks when the paper is not being printed, or to get important news to readers as it happens.

== Reveille staff ==
The Daily Reveille, funded by advertising and student fees, employs more than 80 students each semester in jobs ranging from writing and editing to design and illustration. Each semester a board of professors, students, administrators and media professionals selects an editor-in-chief. The editor-in-chief selects a supporting management staff, who in turn hire writers, copy editors, designers, photographers and other staff members. Staff of the Reveille must be full-time students in good standing with the University; many of them major in mass communication.
