= The Port Arthur News =

- Type: Daily newspaper
- Format: Broadsheet
- Owner: Carpenter Media Group
- Publisher: Stephen Hemelt
- Editor: Monique Batson
- Founded: March 17, 1897
- Headquarters: 2349 Memorial Blvd., Port Arthur, Texas 77640
- Circulation: 2,529 (as of 2023)
- Website: PAnews.com

The Port Arthur News is six-day morning newspaper published every day except Mondays in Port Arthur, Texas, covering Jefferson County. It is owned by Carpenter Media Group. It has not missed an issue since its founding in 1897.

== History ==
The newspaper was founded March 17, 1897, when the Stump family, leaving Missouri, printed the first weekly edition in a baggage car of a train on the way to their new home. The News went daily (except Sunday) in 1901, and a Sunday edition was added in 1916 (although it was later abandoned, and then reintroduced). By 1920, all of Port Arthur's other newspapers had either folded or been bought out by The News. A Texas newspaper chain begun by E.S. Fentress and Charles Marsh bought The News in 1921, overseeing headquarters and press improvements until Cox Enterprises bought it in 1976.

Cox converted The News from an afternoon paper to morning publication in 1986. In 1991, Cox sold The News, along with its sister paper The Orange Leader, to American Publishing Company, which in turn dealt them to Community Newspaper Holdings in 1999. One of the weekly contributors was Neal Morgan Jr. who contributed for 12 years. The pair was sold to Boone Newspapers Inc. in 2014.
