= Port Arthur Independent School District =

School district in Texas, United States

Address
- 4801 9th Avenue Port Arthur, Jefferson, Texas, 77642; United States

District information
- Type: Public
- Grades: PreK–12
- Established: August 24, 1899; 127 years ago
- Superintendent: Dr. Mark Porterie
- Schools: 15
- NCES District ID: 4835400

Students and staff
- Students: 7,664
- Teachers: 572
- Staff: 1,265
- Student–teacher ratio: 13.4
- District mascot: Titans
- Colors: Red, Black, SIlver

Other information
- Website: www.paisd.org

Port Arthur Independent School District is a public school district based in Port Arthur, Texas, United States.

The district serves most of Port Arthur and a portion of Groves.

In 2026, the school district was rated "academically acceptable" by the Texas Education Agency.

== History ==
Prior to 1965 schools were segregated by race: White students attended Thomas Jefferson High School. Black students attended two elementary schools, Carver Elementary School and Lamar Elementary School, as well as Franklin Junior High School and Lincoln High School.

== Dress code ==
The Port Arthur Independent School District adopted a uniform dress code that was enforced district-wide during the 2007–2008 school year.

== Student body ==
In 2025–26 school year, the total number of student enrollment was 7,664.

Student Information 2025–26
| Race/Ethnicity | Percentage |
|---|---|
| African-American | 37.6% |
| Hispanic | 54.9% |
| White | 2.4% |
| American Indian | 1.4% |
| Asian | 2% |
| Pacific Islander | 0% |
| Two or More Races | 1.7% |

Student Enrollment by Type
| Type | Percentage |
|---|---|
| Economically Disadvantaged | 89.4% |
| Special Education | 15.2% |
| Emergent Bilingual/English Learners | 35.1% |

== Schools ==
High schools (Grades 9-12)

- Memorial High School
- Career and Technology Center (in conjunction w/ MHS)
- Woodrow Wilson Early College High School

Middle schools (Grades 6-8)

- Thomas Jefferson Middle School
- Abraham Lincoln Fine Arts Academy

Elementary schools

- Grades PK-5
  - Staff Sergeant Lucian Adams Elementary School
  - Sam Houston Elementary School
  - Lakeview Elementary School
  - Port Acres Elementary School
  - William B. Travis Elementary School
  - Tyrrell Elementary School
- Grades 3-5
  - DeQueen Elementary School
- Grades PK-2
  - Booker T. Washington Elementary School

Pre-Kindergarten

- Wheatley School of Early Childhood Programs

Alternative school

- Port Arthur Alternative Campus

== Former schools ==
High schools

- Stephen F. Austin High School (consolidated into Memorial High)
- Abraham Lincoln High School (consolidated into Memorial High)
- Thomas Jefferson High School (consolidated into Memorial High)
- Bishop Byrne High School (closed in 1983)

Middle schools

- Woodrow Wilson Middle School (Moved to Abraham Lincoln Fine Arts Academy)
- Thomas A. Edison Middle School (Moved to Thomas Jefferson Middle School
- Stephen F. Austin Middle School (Became Memorial High School 9th Grade Academy)
- Abraham Lincoln Middle School (renamed to Fine Arts Academy)

Elementary schools

- Franklin Elementary School (built in 1917. demolished in February 2012)
- Pease Elementary School (demolished)
- Lamar Elementary School (later used an alternative school before being demolished)
- Dick Dowling Elementary School (renamed to Port Acres Elementary)
- Robert E. Lee Elementary School (renamed to Lakeview Elementary)
