= Thomas Jefferson High School (Port Arthur, Texas) =

Defunct high school in Texas, United States

Coordinates: 29.9223°N 93.9115°W

Information
- Closed: 2002 (merged into Memorial High School)

Thomas Jefferson High School was a public high school in Port Arthur, Texas and a part of the Port Arthur Independent School District. Prior to 1965 schools were segregated by race and white students attended Jefferson; the school began admitting black students that year.

In 2002 it merged into Memorial High School.

Janis Joplin and Pro Football Hall of Fame coach Jimmy Johnson were 1960 graduates of the school. Ralph Gean was a student at the school around the same time.
