= Bishop Byrne High School (Texas) =

Coordinates: 29.9274°N 93.9458°W

- Texas; United States

Information
- Closed: 1983

Bishop Byrne High School was a Catholic high school in Port Arthur, Texas. It was located near Texas State Highway 73. It was in the Roman Catholic Diocese of Beaumont.

== History ==
Christopher E. Byrne, a bishop, consolidated St. James High School and St. Mary High School into a single school, which initially had the two campuses but later got a single one. In 1949 the first class of students graduated. In 1965 the school had 500 students. In 1983 170 students were enrolled. In 1983 all of the teachers were lay teachers except for a single nun; the school administration believed having more clergy on staff would show a stronger religious image and encourage more people to enroll.

The school closed in 1983. The owners sold the building, and Christus Southeast Texas established outpatient operations in it.

The Bishop Byrne Alumni Association is in operation.
