= Abraham Lincoln High School (Port Arthur, Texas) =

Defunct high school in Texas, United States

Coordinates: 29.8662°N 93.9495°W

- Port Arthur, Texas; United States

Information
- Established: 1904
- Closed: 2002 (merged into Memorial High School)
- School district: Port Arthur Independent School District
- NCES District ID: 4835400

Abraham Lincoln High School was a public high school in western Port Arthur, Texas and a part of the Port Arthur Independent School District.

== History ==
It was established in 1904.

Prior to 1965 schools were segregated by race and black students attended Lincoln. White students did not choose to attend the school in significant numbers after desegregation even though the district had initial plans for a more racially balanced student body.

In 2002 it merged into Memorial High School. The building was converted into a middle school.
