= Port Arthur, Texas =

Port Arthur
- City
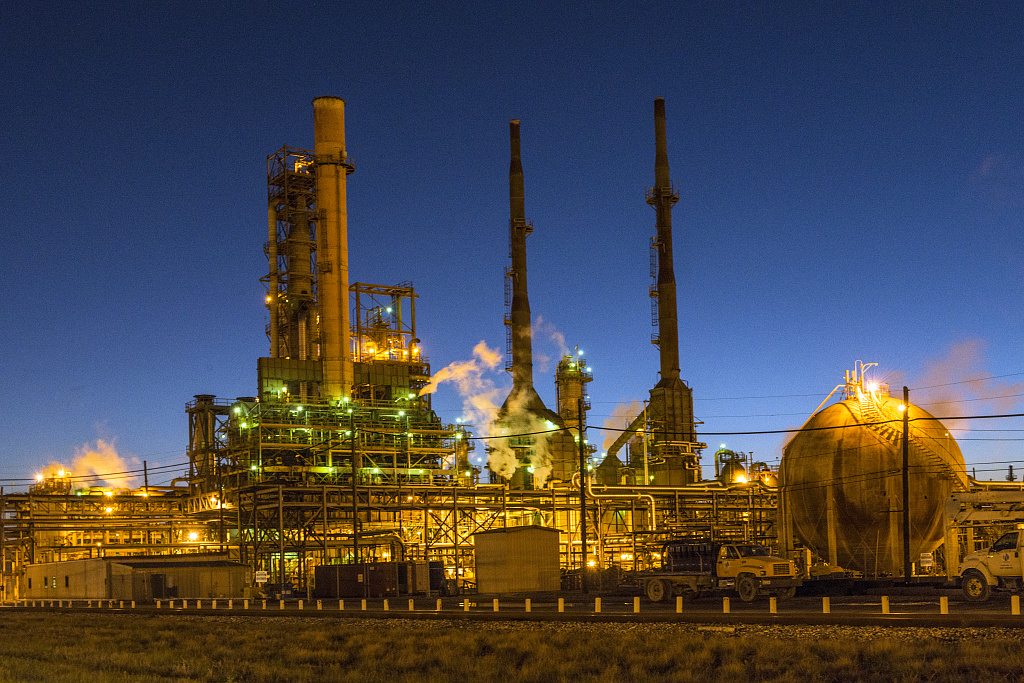
- Port Arthur
- Nicknames: PA, PAT
- Location of Port Arthur, Texas, within Jefferson County

- Location in Texas Location in the United States
- Coordinates: 29°52′18″N 93°56′06″W
- Country: United States
- State: Texas
- County: Jefferson, Orange
- Settled: 1895
- Incorporation: 1898

Government
  - Type: Council-Manager
  - City Council: Mayor

Area
  - Total: 144.17 sq mi (373.41 km^{2})
  - Land: 77.15 sq mi (199.82 km^{2})
  - Water: 67.02 sq mi (173.58 km^{2})
- Elevation: 0 ft (0 m)

Population (2020)
  - Total: 56,039
  - Density: 703.5/sq mi (271.64/km^{2})
- Time zone: UTC−6 (Central (CST))
  - Summer (DST): UTC−5 (CDT)
- ZIP codes: 77640-77642
- Area code: 409
- FIPS code: 48-58820
- GNIS feature ID: 2411461
- Website: www.portarthurtx.gov

Port Arthur is a city in the state of Texas, United States of America, located 90 mi (140 km) east of metropolitan Houston. Part of the Beaumont–Port Arthur metropolitan area, the city lies primarily in Jefferson County, with a small extension in Orange County. The second-largest oil refinery in the US, the Motiva Refinery, is located in Port Arthur.

Its population was 53,818 at the 2010 census, down from 57,755 at the 2000 census. In 2020, its population was 56,039. In the 19th century, initial attempts to settle the area had all failed, mostly. However, in 1895, Arthur Stilwell founded Port Arthur, and the town quickly grew, being incorporated as a city in 1898. It soon developed into a seaport and eventually became the center of a large oil-refinery network. The Rainbow Bridge across the Neches River connects Port Arthur to Bridge City.

Due to its location on the Gulf of Mexico, Port Arthur is vulnerable to hurricanes and other intense tropical weather, as well as extreme heatwaves, high humidity, and tornadoes. Since its inception, the city has experienced several incidences of extreme weather resulting in significant damages and casualties.

== History ==
Aurora was an early settlement attempt near the mouth of Taylor Bayou on Sabine Lake, about 14 miles (23 km) long and 7 miles (11 km) wide. It is a saltwater estuary formed by the confluence of the Neches and Sabine Rivers. Through its tidal outlet, 5-mile-long (8 km) Sabine Pass, Sabine Lake drains some 50,000 sq mi (100,000 km^{2}) of Texas and Louisiana into the Gulf of Mexico. The town was conceived in 1837, and in 1840 promoters led by Almanzon Huston were offering town lots for sale. Some were sold, but Huston's project failed to attract many settlers. The area next was known as "Sparks", after John Sparks, who moved his family to the shores of Sabine Lake near the site of Aurora. The Eastern Texas Railroad, completed between Sabine Pass and Beaumont, Texas, passed 4 miles (6 km) west of Sparks. However, the American Civil War soon began, and rail lines were removed. In 1886, a destructive hurricane hit the coast, causing the remaining residents to dismantle their homes and move to Beaumont. By 1895, Aurora had become a ghost town.

Arthur Stilwell led the resettling of the area as part of his planned city as the southern terminus of his Kansas City, Pittsburg and Gulf Railroad, predecessor to the Kansas City Southern Railway. Stilwell named the city Port Arthur after himself, not the British Royal Navy lieutenant who gave his name to Port Arthur, China.

Pleasure Island now separates the city from the Gulf Intracoastal Waterway. The 18.5-mile (29.8 km) man-made island was created between 1899 and 1908 by the Corps of Engineers to support development of the port.

Arthur Stilwell founded the Port Arthur Channel and Dock Company to manage the port facilities. The port officially opened with the arrival of the British steamer Saint Oswald in 1899.

When oil was discovered at Spindletop, the J.M. Guffey Petroleum Company, later Gulf Oil, had run pipelines to Port Arthur as a shipping point and a location for an oil refinery. In November 1901, the first tanker, the Cardium, departed with Spindletop oil. The refinery was enlarged in 1902, and a pipeline connected to the Glenn Pool Oil Reserve in Oklahoma. The Texas Company, later Texaco, also started building a refinery in 1902. By 1916, the Port Arthur refinery was one of the three largest in the United States.

In 1977, a slate of four candidates (McElroy, Benjamin, Linden, and Strawder) challenged four city council members, including Mayor Bernis Sadler. The "torrid" election led to the voting rights decision in the landmark case of the City of Port Arthur v. United States.

In 2015, the city council proposed an ordinance to declare Port Arthur a "film-friendly city". In October 2021, Governor Abbott announced that the city had officially been declared a "film-friendly city" by the Texas Film Commission.

On December 28, 2024, a large and intense tornado, which was a part of a large and significant tornado outbreak caused significant damage in the city, resulting in one injury.

== Geography ==
Port Arthur is located on the eastern edge of Jefferson County on the west side of Sabine Lake. It is bordered to the northeast by Orange County, Texas, and to the southeast, across Sabine Lake, by Cameron Parish, Louisiana. The Port Arthur city limits extend south along the west side of Sabine Pass, the outlet of Sabine Lake, as far as the Gulf of Mexico on the city's southern border. To the north, the city limits extend across the Neches River into Orange County. Port Arthur is bordered to the northwest by the cities of Nederland, Groves, and Port Neches, and to the northeast by Bridge City in Orange County.

According to the United States Census Bureau, the city has a total area of 144.1 square miles (373.1 km^{2}), of which 76.9 square miles (199.2 km^{2}) are land and 67.1 square miles (173.9 km^{2}), or 46.61%, are covered by water.

=== Conservation ===
Port Arthur and the surrounding Gulf Coast area have several areas dedicated to conservation, as part of the 50 Wildlife Management Areas in Texas, comprising 748,768 acres (303,016 ha) of land. These include the 25,852 acres (10,462 ha) J.D. Murphree Wildlife Management area with the Big Hill Unit (8,312 acres), 4,074 acres (1,649 ha) Salt Bayou Unit (Lost Lake unit), and the Hillebrandt Unit (591 acres),, the 207 acres (84 ha) Candy Cain Abshier Wildlife Management Area (WMA), the Walter Umphrey Park (Keith Lake unit), the Sabine Woods sanctuary, McFaddin and Texas Point National Wildlife Refuges, and the Sea Rim State Park.

=== Communities ===
Communities in Port Arthur include:

- El Vista
- Griffing Park
- Lakeview
- Pear Ridge
- Port Acres
- Sabine Pass
- West Side

=== Tropical cyclones ===
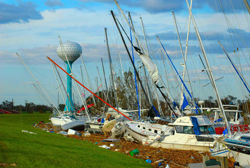
Pleasure Island damage from Hurricane Ike

==== Hurricane of September 12, 1897 ====
Celebrations in Port Arthur on completion of the Kansas City, Pittsburg and Gulf Railroad between Kansas City and Port Arthur occurred Saturday, September 11, 1897. The celebrations brought additional people into town. The next day, a major hurricane hit Port Arthur. Water flowed 5 ft deep in the streets. People loaded into the unfinished railroad roundhouse seeking shelter; the building promptly collapsed, killing four. In the end, 13 people died, homes were destroyed, and a pleasure pier was severely damaged.

==== Hurricane Audrey ====
In June 1957, Hurricane Audrey made landfall just east of Port Arthur in Cameron Parish, Louisiana, as a category 3 hurricane. The storm caused extensive wind damage around the city and significant storm surge flooding just east in Southwest Louisiana.

==== Hurricane Rita ====
On September 24, 2005, Hurricane Rita made landfall between Sabine Pass, Texas, and Johnson Bayou, Louisiana, as a category 3 hurricane. A wind gust of 116 mph (187 km/h) was recorded in Port Arthur. The storm caused widespread significant wind damage throughout the city, with power outages lasting several weeks in some locations. Some areas of the city also received flooding due to Rita.

==== Hurricane Humberto ====
On September 13, 2007, Hurricane Humberto made landfall west of Port Arthur as a category 1 hurricane. The storm moved northeast across the Golden Triangle, causing widespread wind damage; however, most of the damage was relatively minor. An 84 mph (135 km/h) wind gust was recorded at the Southeast Texas Regional Airport just northwest of the city.

==== Tropical Storm Edouard ====
On August 5, 2008, Tropical Storm Edouard made landfall just west of Port Arthur. The effects felt in the city were light, but wind gusts up to 55 mph (89 km/h) were recorded.

==== Hurricane Ike ====
On September 13, 2008, Hurricane Ike made landfall on Galveston Island as a category 2 hurricane. Due to the storm's unusually large size, effects were widespread and were felt across much of Southeast Texas. Port Arthur sustained significant wind damage and many of the city's residents lost power. The Port Arthur seawall protected the city from the major flooding that surrounding cities experienced.

==== Hurricane Harvey ====
On August 29, 2017, after Harvey made a second landfall at tropical storm status, and 26 inches of rain fell in a single day at the airport near Port Arthur, triggering widespread flash flooding in the city. According to the Port Arthur Mayor Derrick Freeman, 20,000 homes were flooded with up to 6 ft of water. On August 30, Freeman posted on Facebook, "Our whole city is underwater right now."

==== Hurricane Laura ====
On August 25, 2020, with Hurricane Laura expected to make landfall as a major hurricane having Port Arthur in its direct path, the city was evacuated. Turning almost due north, though, Laura ended up making its final landfall near Cameron, Louisiana.

=== Climate ===
Somerville has a humid subtropical climate (Köppen: Cfa) with hot summers and mild winters. Port Arthur is tied with Lake Charles, Louisiana, and Astoria, Oregon, as the most humid city in the contiguous United States. The average relative humidity is 90% in the morning, and 72% in the afternoon.

Climate data for Port Arthur, Texas (Jack Brooks Airport) 1991–2020 normals, extremes 1901–present
Month	Jan	Feb	Mar	Apr	May	Jun	Jul	Aug	Sep	Oct	Nov	Dec	Year
Record high °F (°C)	86 (30)	90 (32)	95 (35)	94 (34)	101 (38)	106 (41)	108 (42)	111 (44)	105 (41)	99 (37)	94 (34)	86 (30)	108 (42)
Mean maximum °F (°C)	77.4 (25.2)	79.3 (26.3)	83.0 (28.3)	86.9 (30.5)	91.7 (33.2)	95.7 (35.4)	97.0 (36.1)	98.4 (36.9)	95.8 (35.4)	90.7 (32.6)	83.9 (28.8)	79.2 (26.2)	99.3 (37.4)
Mean daily maximum °F (°C)	63.5 (17.5)	67.3 (19.6)	73.2 (22.9)	79.0 (26.1)	85.7 (29.8)	90.9 (32.7)	92.6 (33.7)	93.1 (33.9)	89.5 (31.9)	82.1 (27.8)	72.3 (22.4)	65.5 (18.6)	79.6 (26.4)
Daily mean °F (°C)	53.7 (12.1)	57.5 (14.2)	63.3 (17.4)	69.3 (20.7)	76.5 (24.7)	82.0 (27.8)	83.6 (28.7)	83.8 (28.8)	80.0 (26.7)	71.6 (22.0)	61.9 (16.6)	55.6 (13.1)	69.9 (21.1)
Mean daily minimum °F (°C)	43.8 (6.6)	47.8 (8.8)	53.4 (11.9)	59.6 (15.3)	67.3 (19.6)	73.1 (22.8)	74.6 (23.7)	74.4 (23.6)	70.6 (21.4)	61.1 (16.2)	51.5 (10.8)	45.8 (7.7)	60.2 (15.7)
Mean minimum °F (°C)	28.0 (−2.2)	31.9 (−0.1)	35.6 (2.0)	43.3 (6.3)	53.9 (12.2)	66.3 (19.1)	70.3 (21.3)	69.7 (20.9)	58.4 (14.7)	44.1 (6.7)	34.3 (1.3)	30.6 (−0.8)	26.2 (−3.2)
Record low °F (°C)	11 (−12)	10 (−12)	20 (−7)	32 (0)	42 (6)	53 (12)	61 (16)	58 (14)	45 (7)	30 (−1)	22 (−6)	12 (−11)	10 (−12)
Average precipitation inches (mm)	5.32 (135)	3.09 (78)	3.63 (92)	3.92 (100)	4.70 (119)	6.70 (170)	6.85 (174)	6.89 (175)	6.69 (170)	5.47 (139)	3.89 (99)	4.98 (126)	62.13 (1,578)
Average precipitation days (≥ 0.01 in)	9.6	8.6	7.6	7.2	7.2	10.7	11.8	11.3	8.9	7.5	7.6	9.7	107.7
Average relative humidity (%)	79.0	76.6	76.2	77.1	78.7	79.0	80.7	80.3	79.3	76.9	78.0	79.6	78.4
Mean monthly sunshine hours	135.5	168.5	188.1	203.2	262.9	284.6	281.7	258.6	231.9	241.3	184.8	148.9	2,590
Percentage possible sunshine	42	54	51	53	62	68	66	63	63	68	58	47	58
Source: NOAA (relative humidity and sun 1961–1990)

== Demographics ==
Historical population
Census	Pop.	Note	%±
1900	900		—
1910	7,663		751.4%
1920	22,251		190.4%
1930	50,902		128.8%
1940	46,140		−9.4%
1950	57,530		24.7%
1960	66,676		15.9%
1970	57,371		−14.0%
1980	61,251		6.8%
1990	58,724		−4.1%
2000	57,755		−1.7%
2010	53,818		−6.8%
2020	56,039		4.1%
2024 (est.)	55,799		−0.4%
U.S. Decennial Census

=== 2020 census ===
As of the 2020 census, Port Arthur had a population of 56,039. The median age was 35.1 years; 27.0% of residents were under 18 and 13.8% were 65 or older. For every 100 females, there were 97.7 males, and for every 100 females 18 and over, there were 94.7 males 18 and over.

Racial composition as of the 2020 census
Race	Number	Percent
White	13,496	24.1%
Black or African American	21,320	38.0%
American Indian and Alaska Native	539	1.0%
Asian	3,323	5.9%
Native Hawaiian and other Pacific Islander	26	0.0%
Some other race	10,605	18.9%
Two or more races	6,730	12.0%
Hispanic or Latino (of any race)	21,165	37.8%

Almost all of the residents lived in urban areas, while 1.3% lived in rural areas.

Of the 20,990 households in Port Arthur, 35.9% had children under 18 living in them, 36.7% were married-couple households, 22.9% had a male householder and no spouse or partner present, and 34.4% had a female householder and no spouse or partner present. About 30.1% of all households were made up of individuals, and 11.1% had someone living alone who was 65 or older.

The city had 24,504 housing units, of which 14.3% were vacant. The homeowner vacancy rate was 1.5% and the rental vacancy rate was 13.8%.

=== 2010 census ===
At the 2010 census, 53,818 people, 20,183 households, and 13,191 families resided in the city. The population density was 654.6 inhabitants per square mile (252.7/km^{2}). The 23,577 housing units averaged 284.4 per square mile (109.8/km^{2}). The racial makeup of the city was 41.7% African American, 37.9% White, 1.2% Native American, 6.3% Asian, 0.1% Pacific Islander, and 15.3% from other races. Hispanics or Latino Americans of any race were 29.6% of the population. Of the 20,183 households in 2010, 30.2% had children under 18 living with them, 39.2% were married couples living together, 19.8% had a female householder with no husband present, and 34.6% were not families; 30.1% of all households were made up of individuals, and 11.1% had someone living alone who was 65 or older. The average household size was 2.63, and the average family size was 3.31. In the city, the age distribution was 27.0% under the age of 18, 9.7% from 18 to 24, 24.7% from 25 to 44, 25.2% from 45 to 64, and 13.3% who were 65 or older. The median age was 35.3 years. For every 100 females, there were 96.9 males. For every 100 females 18 and over, there were 94.1 males.

=== 2019 American Community Survey estimates ===
In 2019, the American Community Survey estimated 18.7% of the population was non-Hispanic White, 38.1% Black and African American, 0.2% Native American, 7.3% Asian, 0.1% Pacific Islander, 0.2% some other race, and 34.5% Hispanic or Latino American of any race.

From 2014 to 2019, the median household income was $36,557; families had a median income of $44,115; married families $56,304; and nonfamily households $24,280. Among the population, 27.2% lived at or below the poverty line, against the state's 13.6% impoverished population from 2014 to 2019 census estimates. In contrast, the nearby city of Beaumont had a poverty rate of 16.7%, down from 17.6%.

== Economy ==
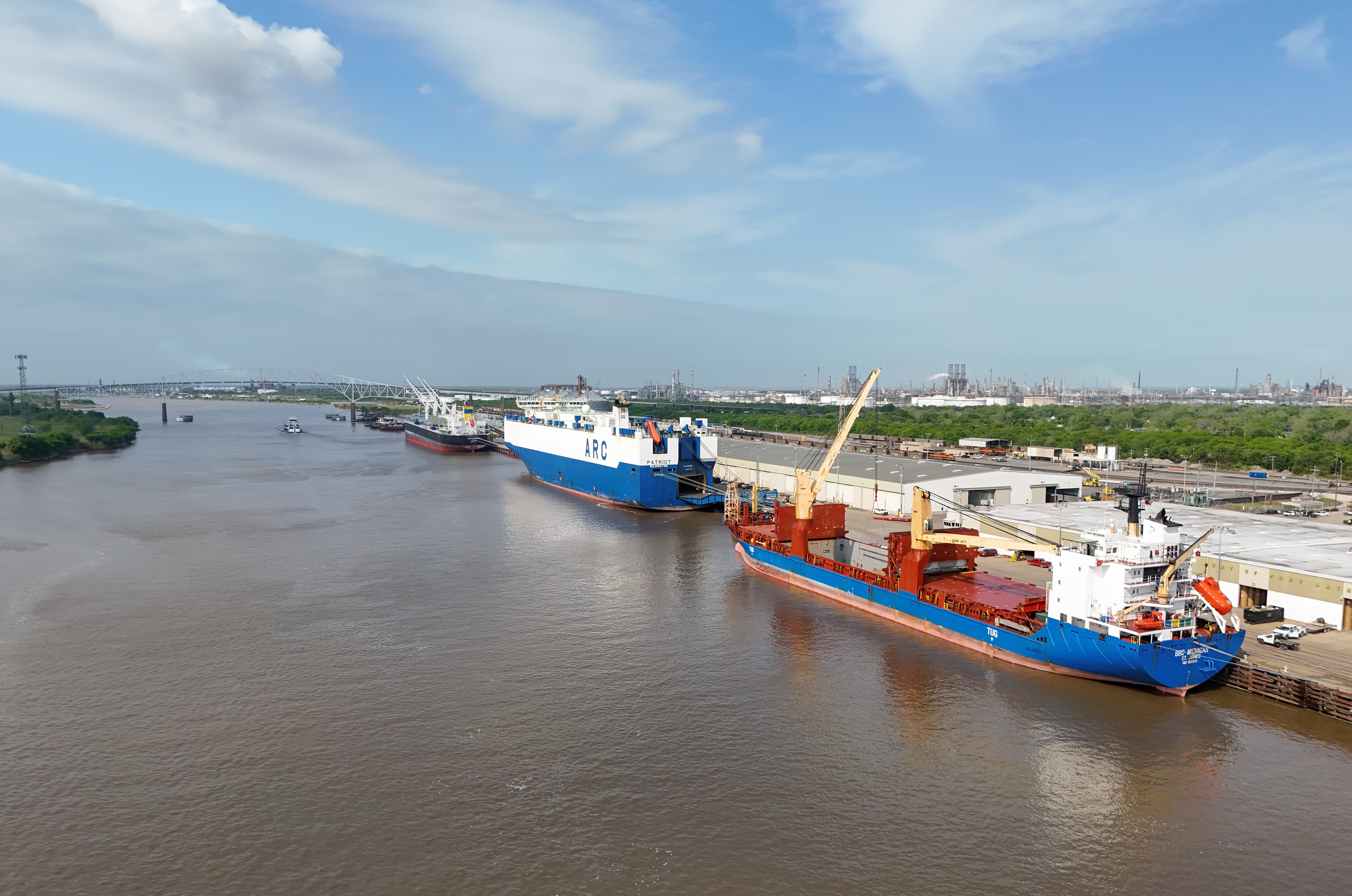
Port of Port Arthur

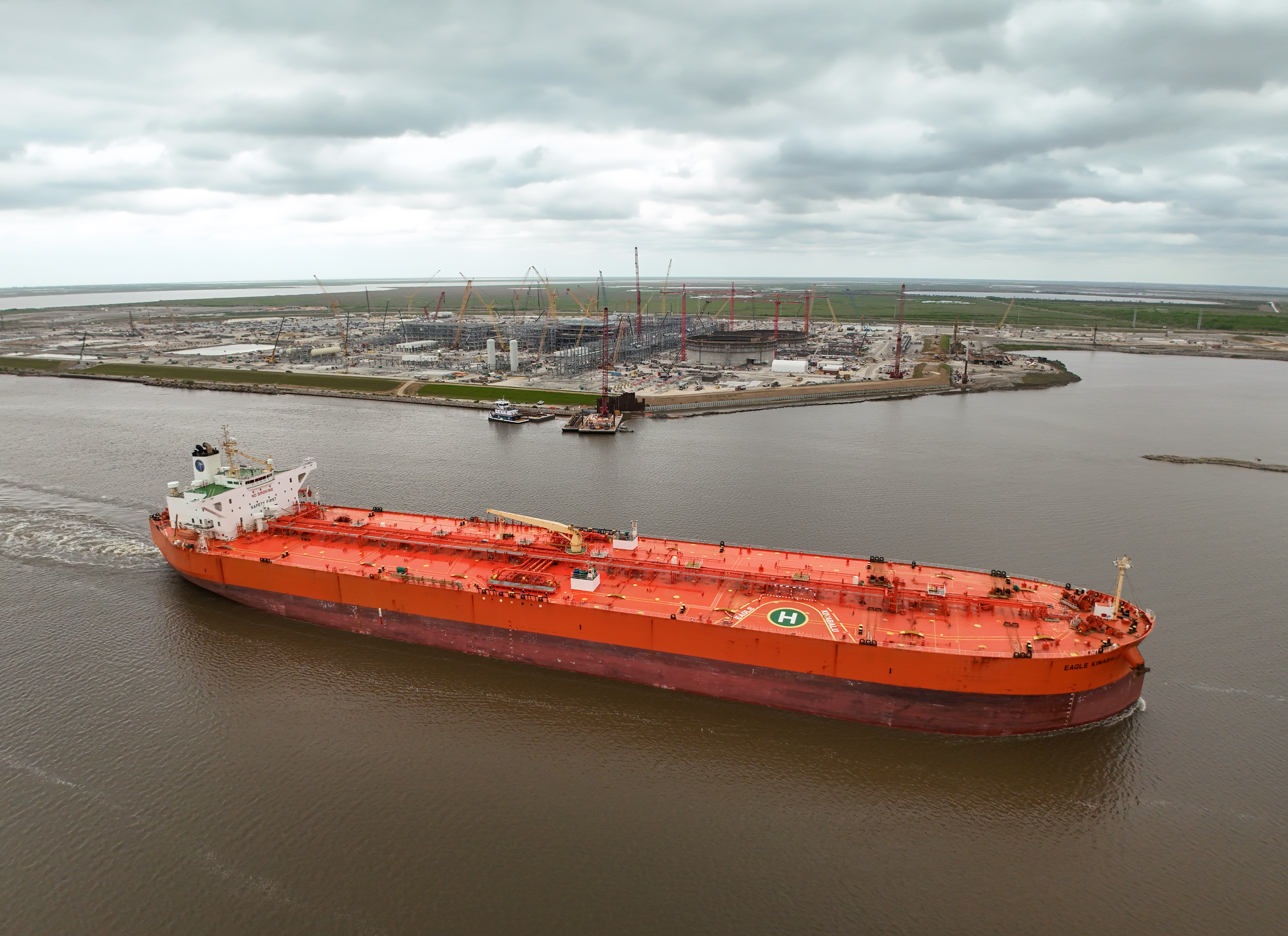
Oil Tanker passing by a new LNG facility

Home to a large portion of United States oil refining capacity, Port Arthur has seen renewed investment in several key installations. Motiva Enterprises began undertaking a major addition to its western Port Arthur refinery, expanding capacity to 600,000 barrels per day (95,000 m^{3}/d). This $10.0 billion project is the largest US refinery expansion to occur in 30 years. Premcor Refining (now Valero) completed a $775 million expansion of its petrochemical plant, and BASF/Fina commenced operations of a new $1.75 billion gasification and cogeneration unit on premises of its current installation, which had just completed its own $1 billion upgrade. These operations are supported by the Port of Port Arthur, one of Texas' leading seaports.

The city was the site of an oil spill in 2010, when an oil tanker and barge collided, causing 450,000 gallons of oil to spill into the Sabine/Neches waterway alongside the city.

=== Central business district disintegration ===
The commercial center of Port Arthur was at its peak in the early 1900s. Together with the effects of suburbanization, which drew off wealthier residents to new housing away from town, gradually taking businesses with them, from 1960 until 1974, successive waves of economic recession caused much distress in the town. The central business district has many boarded up and vacant locations.

==== Hotel Sabine ====
The Hotel Sabine opened at 600 Proctor Street in 1929 and operated as the Vaughn Hotel until the mid-1930s. At 118 feet, 10 stories, and the tallest building in Port Arthur, the building is of Beaux-Arts architecture style, built with steel-reinforced concrete and brick on 640 steel-laced wooden cypress pilings driven 60 ft into the ground. It was overdesigned and overbuilt due to lack of knowledge on the strength of concrete in the 1920s. The hotel closed down in the mid-1980s.

The Port Arthur News reported August 28, 2010, that "DWA (Digital Workforce Academy) Buys Sabine Hotel", By November 2011, the hotel was reported to be slated for demolition. The cost of renovations was estimated at $10–12 million and the demolition estimate was $500,000 to $1.2 million. As of April 2021, Motiva was still considering buying the hotel, but remained uncertain and uncommitted to it.

Hurricane Rita struck a direct hit on the Proctor Street Seawall and damaged many downtown businesses and homes. As economic activity picked up in the region, calls for downtown revitalization have been advanced. The true center of commercial activity has gravitated from downtown to other areas. The main shopping center is Central Mall, opened outside the downtown in 1982.

== Arts and culture ==
Port Arthur's Museum of the Gulf Coast is recognized as the area's definitive collection of items and displays for figures from Port Arthur and the surrounding communities.

UGK, perhaps Texas's most influential hip-hop group, originated in Port Arthur before relocating to Houston.

== Government ==
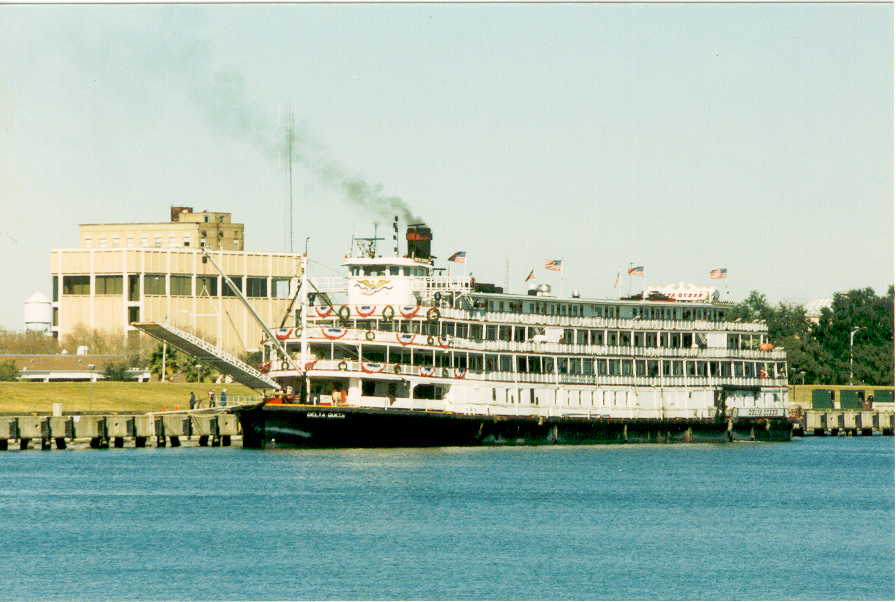
Delta Queen moored in front of City Hall

The city manager of Port Arthur is Ronald Burton. The mayor is Charlotte M. Moses.

The county operates the Jefferson County Sub-Courthouse in Port Arthur.

Government for Port Arthur
Position	Name	Elected to Current Position
Mayor	Charlotte M. Moses	2025–present
At Large Position 5	Thomas Kinlaw III	2023–present
At Large Position 6	Donald Frank	2020–present
District 1	Taylor Getwood	2026–present
District 2	Cal Jones	2007–2008, 2017–2023, 2026–present
District 3	Warren Pena	2026–present
District 4	Kaala Jacobs	2026–present

=== Politics ===
List of mayors of Port Arthur, Texas
- Nat R. Strong, 1898–1899
- Charles Eugene Smith, 1899–1902
- Rome H. Woodworth, 1902–1905
- Joseph P. Landes, 1905–1906
- J. H. Drummond, 1906–1908
- P. C. Pfeiffer, 1908–1911
- George N. Bliss, 1911–1915
- R. H. Dunn, 1915–1917
- John W. Tryon, 1917–1921
- James Pinckney Logan, 1921–1929, 1931–1932, 1950–1952
- J. W. O'Neal, 1929–1931
- H. M. Smith, 1932–1933
- H. O. Preston, 1933–1934
- E. R. Winstel, 1934–1935
- Fred L. Bachert, 1935–1936, 1939–1940
- Inman H. Wheless, 1936–1937
- Frank J. Imhoff, 1937–1938
- Neal D. Rader, 1938–1939
- L. C. Heare, 1940–1942
- R. L. Rutan, 1942–1944
- Leland Lacy, 1944–1945
- Walter H. Bailey, 1945–1947
- H. L. Crow, 1947–1948
- James Walter Long, 1948–1950
- Chris F. Petersen, 1952–1953
- Myron J. Babin Jr., 1953–1954
- Nick Norris, 1954
- A. L. Gillman, 1954
- C. R. Eisler, 1954–1957, 1959–1960, 1960–1961
- Zane Q. Johnson, 1957–1958
- M. B. Avila, 1958–1959
- Herman T. Schneider, 1960
- Harvie A. Parker, 1961–1963
- R. B. McCollum, 1963
- Lloyd Hayes, 1963–1969
- Bernis Sadler, 1969–1984
- Malcolm Clark, 1984–1990
- Mary Ellen Summerlin, 1990–1994
- Robert T. Morgan Jr., 1994–1998
- Oscar Ortiz, 1998–2007
- Delores "Bobbi" Prince, 2007–2016
- Derrick Freeman, 2016–2019
- Thurman Bartie, 2019–2025
- Charlotte Moses, 2025–present

The United States Postal Service operates the Port Arthur Post Office, the Port Acres Post Office, and the Sabine Pass Post Office in Sabine Pass.

=== State and federal representation ===
In the Texas State Legislation, Port Arthur is in the 4th Senate District, represented by Republican Brett Ligon, and in the 22nd State House District, represented by Democrat Christian Manuel while the Sabine Pass portion of Port Arthur is within the 21st State House District, represented by Republican Dade Phelan.

In the United States House of Representatives, Port Arthur is in Texas' 14th congressional district, represented by Republican Randy Weber.

== Education ==
=== Colleges ===
Lamar State College-Port Arthur, located in downtown Port Arthur, celebrated its 100th birthday in 2009. Offering a full variety of basic core curriculum classes in which credits are transferable throughout Texas public universities, Lamar State College is recognized for associate programs in commercial music, nursing, legal assistant, and process technology. The college also fields competitive teams in men's basketball and women's softball.

Galveston College: The sections of Port Arthur within the Hamshire-Fannett and Sabine Pass ISDs are assigned to Galveston College in Galveston. State legislation does not specify an assigned community college for the remainder of Jefferson County.

The Career and Technical Education Center, formerly named Stilwell Technical Center, is the second college in Port Arthur. In 2012, the school was relocated to a new building on the same property as Memorial High School at 3501 Sgt Lucian Adams Dr. The Port Arthur Independent School District is now headquartered at its former location on 9th Avenue.

=== Primary and secondary schools ===
Most of the city is served by the Port Arthur Independent School District. It operates a single high school, Memorial High School, formed in 2002 by the consolidation of three high schools: Stephen F. Austin, Abraham Lincoln, and Thomas Jefferson.

The portion around Southeast Texas Regional Airport is served by the Nederland Independent School District. Some parts are served by Port Neches-Groves Independent School District. The Sabine Pass community is served by the Sabine Pass Independent School District. Portions of Port Arthur are in Nederland ISD, Beaumont ISD, and Hamshire-Fannett ISD. In Orange County, the portions of Port Arthur are in Bridge City Independent School District.

The Bob Hope Charter School is located in Port Arthur.

The city had a Catholic high school, Bishop Byrne High School, which closed in 1983.

=== Public libraries ===
The Port Arthur Public Library, at 4615 9th Avenue at Texas State Highway 73, serves as the public library system for the city.

== Media ==
=== Newspapers ===
The Port Arthur News is the only daily newspaper serving Port Arthur. Operating since 1897, The News is one of the oldest continually operated businesses in Port Arthur. It is currently owned and operated by Boone Newspapers. From 1932–1941, Port Arthur had a second newspaper called The Peoples Press.

=== Television ===
- KBTV (Roar) channel 4
- KGEW-LD (Telemundo) channel 33

=== Radio ===
Frequency	Call letters / licensed to (if not Beaumont)	Format	Owner	Notes
560	KLVI	News, Talk radio	iHeartMedia	KLVI-AM
1250	KDEI (Port Arthur)	Catholic radio	Radio Maria	KDEI-AM
1340	KOLE (Port Arthur)	Various	Birach Broadcasting	KOLE-AM
92.5	KCOL (Groves)	Oldies "Cool 92.5"	iHeartMedia	KCOL-FM
93.3 (Port Arthur)	KQBU	Regional Mexican "Que Buena 93.3"	Univision	KQBU-FM
94.1	KQXY	CHR "Q94"	Cumulus Broadcasting	KQXY-FM
95.1	KYKR	Country "Kicker 95.1"	iHeartMedia	KYKR-FM
98.5	KTJM (Port Arthur)	Regional Mexican "La Raza 98.5/103.3"	Liberman Broadcasting-Houston	KTJM-FM
102.5	KTCX (Beaumont)	Urban contemporary "Magic 102.5"	Cumulus Broadcasting	KTCX-FM
103.3	K277AG (Beaumont)	Hip-Hop, R&B "The Beat 103.3"	iHeartMedia	Simulcast of KKMY-HD2
104.5 (Orange)	KKMY	Rhythmic CHR "104.5 Kiss FM"	iHeartMedia	KKMY-FM
105.3	KLTW (Winnie)	Contemporary Christian	Educational Media Foundation	KLTW-FM
106.1	KIOC (Orange)	Rock "Big Dog 106"	iHeartMedia	KIOC-FM
107.9	KQQK	Regional Mexican "107.9 El Norte"	Liberman Broadcasting-Houston	KQQK-FM

== Transportation ==
=== Air ===
The Jack Brooks Regional Airport in the northwest part of Port Arthur serves Beaumont and Port Arthur.

=== Bus ===
Local bus service is provided by Port Arthur Transit.

=== Rail ===
The nearest inter-city rail station to Port Arthur is Beaumont Amtrak station in nearby Beaumont, which serves the greater area. The station is served by Amtrak's Sunset Limited line, with a train arriving thrice weekly in each direction.

=== Major highways ===
- U.S. Highway 69/U.S. Highway 96/U.S. Highway 287
- State Highway 73
- State Highway 82
- State Highway 87
- State Highway 347
- Spur 93
- Spur 215

=== Major Farm-to-Market roads ===
- Farm to Market Road 365
- Farm to Market Road 366

== Notable people ==
=== Athletics ===
- Jonathan Babineaux (born 1981), former professional NFL football player, Atlanta Falcons
- Jordan Babineaux, former professional NFL football player, Seattle Seahawks and Tennessee Titans
- Aaron Brown, professional NFL football player
- J'Covan Brown (born 1990), basketball player in the Israel Basketball Premier League
- Ravin Caldwell (born 1963), former NFL linebacker for the Washington Redskins.
- Jamaal Charles (born 1986), professional NFL football player
- Todd Dodge (born 1963), American football coach
- Earl Evans (1955–2012), college and professional NBA basketball player
- Kevin Everett (born 1982), professional NFL football player
- Mitch Gaspard (born 1965), college baseball coach
- Danny Gorrer, professional NFL football player
- Jim Hurtubise (born in North Tonawanda, New York), race car driver, moved to Port Arthur as an adult.
- Stephen Jackson (born 1978 in Houston, Texas), former professional basketball player, who played in the NBA for 14 seasons.
- Jimmy Johnson, football broadcaster, player, NFL coach, and executive
- Bobby Leopold, professional NFL football player
- Kenneth Lofton Jr. (born 2002), basketball player, Israeli Basketball Premier League, formerly NBA, college, and FIBA U-19 champion Team USA player.
- Inika McPherson, track and field athlete
- Donald Narcisse (born 1965), player in Canadian Football League
- Elandon Roberts (born 1994), professional NFL football player.
- Joe Washington (born 1953), college and professional NFL football player.
- Babe Didrikson Zaharias, athlete who excelled in golf, basketball, baseball and track and field.

=== Business ===
- Max Flatow, architect, was born in Port Arthur.
- John Warne Gates (born West Chicago (then known as Turner Junction), Illinois), wire and steel magnate, railroad and oil financier
- Tom Hicks, former owner of Texas Rangers, Dallas Stars, Liverpool FC, and Dr Pepper/7-UP

=== Law ===
- Jennifer Walker Elrod, Chief Judge of the United States Court of Appeals for the Fifth Circuit

=== Movies, television, and media ===
- G.W. Bailey, actor
- Kree Harrison, runner-up on American Idol, 12th season
- Evelyn Keyes, film actress
- Amber Chardae Robinson, actress
- Tad Tadlock, choreographer
- Ken Webster, actor and director.

=== Music ===
- Zachary Breaux, jazz musician
- C. J. Chenier, musician
- Ted Dunbar, jazz musician
- Ralph Gean, singer/songwriter.
- Jason Halbert, musical director for Kelly Clarkson.
- Lee Hazlewood (born in Mannford, Oklahoma), musician, was raised in Port Arthur.
- Janis Joplin, singer/songwriter
- Pimp C & Bun B of UGK, rappers
- Johnny Preston, pop singer.
- J. P. Richardson a.k.a. The Big Bopper, singer and songwriter born in the Port Arthur neighborhood of Sabine Pass

=== Politics ===
- Brian Babin, U.S. Representative for Texas
- Carl A. Parker, former Texas House Representative, State Senator
- Nelson R. Strong, Texas House Representative, First mayor of Port Arthur
- Raymond Strother, political consultant

=== Miscellaneous ===
- Lucian Adams, recipient of Medal of Honor, Bronze Star, and Purple Heart
- Elroy Chester, racially motivated serial killer executed in 2013 for 5 murders
- Robert Rauschenberg, painter and graphic artist
- Leah Rhodes, Hollywood costume designer.

== See also ==
- List of oil pipelines
- List of oil refineries
