= Senator Ligon =

Senator Ligon may refer to:

- Brett Ligon (fl. 2020s), Texas State Senate
- Robert F. Ligon (1823–1901), Alabama State Senate
- William Ligon (born 1961), Georgia State Senate
