= Carl A. Parker =

American politician (1934–2024)

Carl Parker

Member of the Texas Senate from the 4th district
- In office January 11, 1977 – January 10, 1995
- Preceded by: D. Roy Harrington
- Succeeded by: Michael Galloway

Member of the Texas House of Representatives
- In office January 9, 1973 – January 11, 1977
- Constituency: District 7-3
- In office November 23, 1962 – January 9, 1973
- Preceded by: D. Roy Harrington
- Succeeded by: district discontinued due to redistricting
- Constituency: District 9-3

Personal details
- Born: Carl Allen Parker; August 6, 1934 Port Arthur, Texas, U.S.
- Died: March 22, 2024 (aged 89) Port Arthur, Texas, U.S.
- Party: Democratic
- Spouse: Beverly Parker
- Children: 3
- Education: University of Texas, Austin (BA, LLB)

Carl A. Parker (August 6, 1934 – March 22, 2024) was an American politician. He served as a Democratic member in the Texas House of Representatives from 1962 to 1977 and in the State Senate from 1977 to 1995. His tenure of service included time as Speaker Pro Tempore of the House and President Pro Tempore of the State Senate.

Senator Parker contributed to more than 400 bills.

== Texas House of Representatives (1962-1977) ==
Parker entered into politics when he was elected to the Texas House of Representatives in November of 1962.

Early into his political career, Parker sponsored bill measures to enable legislation for the establishment of the Port of Port Arthur Navigation District during the 1963 Texas legislative session.

Parker sponsored Texas' First Industrial Safety Bill (House Bill 559, the Occupational Safety Act) during the 60th Texas Legislative Session in 1967. This created the Texas Occupational Safety Board and the Occupational Safety Division under the State Department of Health to enforce the state's first comprehensive workplace safety codes.

State Representative Parker helped sponsor and pass Texas's landmark consumer protection legislation, known as the Deceptive Trade Practices-Consumer Remedies Act (DTPA), which was signed into law on May 21, 1973, during the 63rd Texas Legislature. The core purpose of this bill was to prohibit false, misleading, or deceptive business practices and give everyday consumers a direct legal path to sue for damages.

Parker was the Speaker Pro Tem on June 18, 1973.

== Texas Senate (1977-1995) ==
Senator Carl A. Parker sponsored the legislation that created the Texas Housing Agency in 1979. The bill (Senate Bill 296) was introduced in March 1979, successfully passed by the legislature, and signed into law later that year by Governor Bill Clements. The purpose of this bill was created to issue revenue bonds and foster private investment to improve and expand low-income residential housing in Texas.

In 1979, Parker was a member of the Killer Bees, the group of twelve quorum-busting Democratic senators that hid out in an Austin garage apartment for 4½ days.

Senator Parker sponsored the landmark legislation in 1983 that formally established the multi-campus Lamar University System, which established and incorporated Lamar University-Port Arthur (now Lamar State College-Port Arthur).

As chairman of the Senate Education Committee, Senator Parker was instrumental in carrying and negotiating the heavy reform package of the Education Reform Bill of 1984. The legislation introduced the controversial "No Pass, No Play" rule, raised teacher salaries, lowered class sizes, and set a standard 70 passing grade.

Parker was elected in the 1986 general election to serve as President Pro Tempore of the Texas Senate in the 70th legislative. He continued this position until 1989.

In 1991, Senator Parker sponsored legislation merging all state environmental agencies into one, which was originally named the Texas Natural Resource Conservation Committee [TNRCC], later evolving into the Texas Commission on Environmental Quality [TCEQ]—rather than a "Committee".

He also sponsored the Insurance Reform Bill of 1991 and the School Finance Reform Bill in 1991 during the 72nd Texas Legislature. As chairman of the Senate Education Committee, he successfully championed the legislation to create a more equitable public school funding system in response to state court mandates.

Parker served as Senator of the 4th Senatorial District until 1995.

== Death ==
Parker died in Port Arthur, Texas, on March 22, 2024, at the age of 89. He was survived by his wife, Dr. Beverly Parker, his son Allen, with whom he practiced law for many years, and two daughters.

Following his death, a memoir was published. Turtle on a Post is a collection of memoirs that tells the story of the life and legacy of Senator Carl Parker as told to Jim Sanderson.

== Honors ==
In the 1990s, a statue of Parker was inducted into the Notable People Hall of Fame in Port Arthur's Museum of the Gulf Coast after he in 1994 was one of nine luminaries — he was the seventh — who sat through good natured “roasts” to raise money to support the museum. His event — among those who attended was Gov. Ann Richards — generated more than $100,000.

In 2004, a new building on the Lamar State College-Port Arthur campus was named the Carl A. Parker Multipurpose Building in honor of Parker, who had a long-standing connection with the college.
