= Brad Bailey (Texas politician) =

American politician

Member-elect of the Texas House of Representatives from the 15th district
- Assuming office January 2027
- Succeeding: Steve Toth

Personal details
- Party: Republican

Brad Bailey is an American politician. A member of the Republican Party, he is the member-elect for the 15th district of the Texas House of Representatives.

== Early life ==
Bailey is originally from Nassau Bay, Texas, which is in the Clear Lake area. He attended Clear Creek High School. He graduated from Kilgore College in 1994. In 1997, he graduated from the University of Mississippi.
