= Tommy Williams (Texas politician) =

American politician

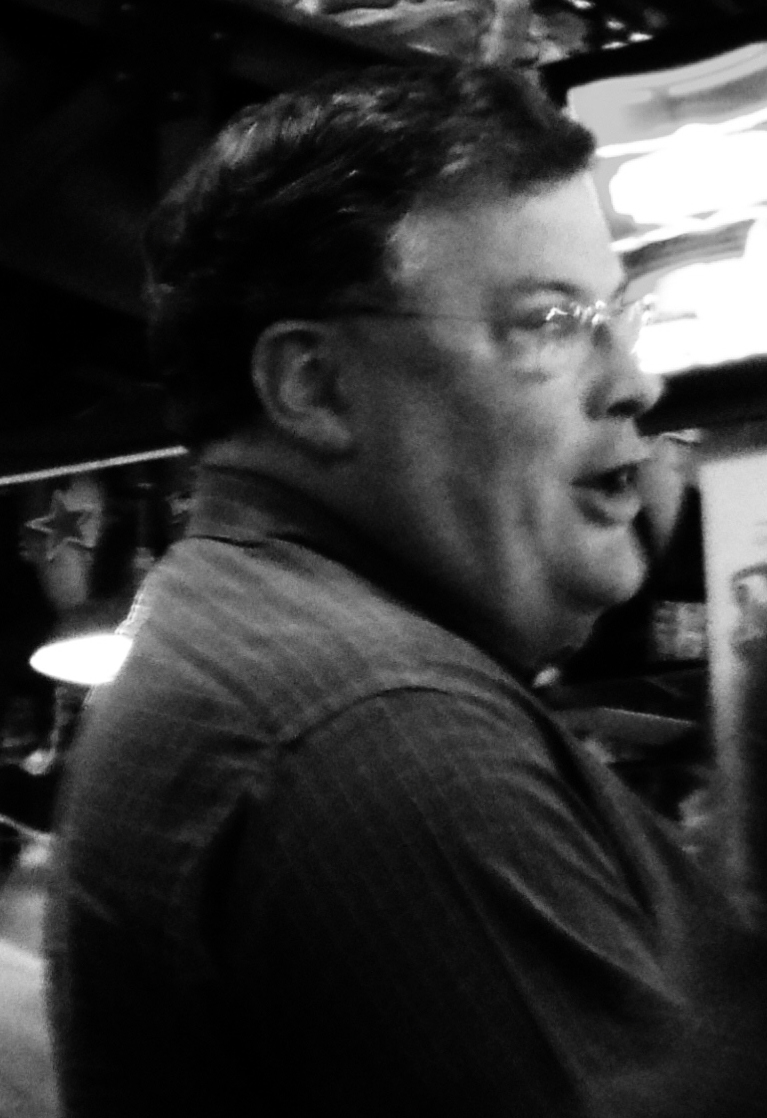
- Williams in 2010

Interim President of Texas A&M University
- In office October 3, 2025 – May 6, 2026
- Preceded by: James Hallmark (acting)
- Succeeded by: Susan Ballabina

Member of the Texas Senate from the 4th district
- In office January 14, 2003 – October 25, 2013
- Preceded by: David Bernsen
- Succeeded by: Brandon Creighton

Member of the Texas House of Representatives from the 15th district
- In office January 14, 1997 – January 14, 2003
- Preceded by: Kevin Brady
- Succeeded by: Rob Eissler

Personal details
- Born: December 17, 1956 (age 69) Marshall, Texas, U.S.
- Party: Republican
- Spouse: Marsha
- Children: 2
- Education: Texas A&M University (BBA)
- Profession: Banker

Thomas David Williams, also known as Tommy Williams (born December 17, 1956), is an American politician who served as the interim president of Texas A&M University from 2025 to 2026. A member of the Republican Party, he served in the Texas Legislature from 1997 to 2013.

== Background ==
Williams was first elected to the Texas Senate in 2002, after incumbent District 4 Senator David Bernsen, a Democrat, declined to seek re-election after redistricting changed the composition of the district. (Bernsen instead ran unsuccessfully for Texas Land Commissioner, losing that race to Jerry E. Patterson.)

After more than ten years in office, Williams, the chairman of the Senate Finance Committee, was in October 2013 in the process of resigning, to accept a government relations position at his alma mater, Texas A&M University in College Station. On October 3, Williams confirmed that he would not run again in the Republican primary election scheduled for March 4, 2014.

Williams previously served three terms from 1997 to 2003 in the Texas House of Representatives. Williams has served as president of Woodforest Financial Services, an affiliate of Woodforest National Bank. Williams started his new position at Texas A&M on December 2, 2013.

Among those seeking to fill Williams' Senate seat were neighboring State Representatives Steve Toth of District 15 in The Woodlands and Brandon Creighton of District 16 in Conroe, both of Montgomery County. Creighton defeated Toth in a runoff election to claim the seat.

On October 3, 2025, the Texas A&M University System Board of Regents unanimously approved Tommy Williams as interim president of Texas A&M University.

== Election results ==
=== Most recent election ===
==== 2004 ====
Texas general election, 2004: Senate District 3
Party	Candidate	Votes	%	±%
Republican	Tommy Williams (Incumbent)	176,464	100.00	+36.47
Majority		176,464	100.00	+72.93
Turnout		176,464		+15.30
Republican hold				

=== Previous elections ===
==== 2002 ====
Texas general election, 2002: Senate District 3
Party	Candidate	Votes	%	±%
Republican	Tommy Williams	97,237	63.53	+18.69
Democratic	Mike Smith	55,808	36.47	−18.69
Majority		41,429	27.07	+16.76
Turnout		153,045		+10.28
Republican gain from Democratic				

Republican primary runoff, 2002: Senate District 3
Candidate		Votes	%	±
	Michael Galloway	5,320	46.11	+11.32
✓	Tommy Williams	6,218	53.89	+8.69
Majority		898	0.92	
Turnout		11,538		

Republican primary, 2002: Senate District 3
Candidate		Votes	%	±
	Martin Basaldua	4,571	20.01	
✓	Michael Galloway	7,947	34.79	
✓	Tommy Williams	10,327	45.20	
Turnout		22,845		

==== 2000 ====
Texas general election, 2000: House District 15
Party	Candidate	Votes	%	±%
Republican	Tommy Williams (Incumbent)	53,164	88.38	+18.78
Libertarian	Allen Wolf	6,988	11.62	+11.62
Majority		46,176	76.77	+37.56
Turnout		60,152		+63.81
Republican hold				

==== 1998 ====
Texas general election, 1998: House District 15
Party	Candidate	Votes	%	±%
Republican	Tommy Williams (Incumbent)	25,558	69.60	+0.65
Democratic	Larry R. Hickman	11,163	30.40	−0.65
Majority		14,395	39.20	+1.30
Turnout		36,721		−26.11
Republican hold				

==== 1996 ====
Texas general election, 1996: House District 15
Party	Candidate	Votes	%	±%
Republican	Tommy Williams	34,264	68.94	−31.05
Democratic	Peter B. Plotts	15,431	31.05	+11.03
Majority		18,833	37.90	−62.10
Turnout		49,695		+74.34
Republican hold				

Republican primary runoff, 1996: House District 15
Candidate		Votes	%	±
	Nelda Luce Blair	3,733	40.39	+11.37
✓	Tommy Williams	5,509	59.60	+25.38
Majority		1,776	19.22	
Turnout		9,242		

Republican primary, 1996: House District 15
Candidate		Votes	%	±
	Jim Alexander	2,613	20.02	
✓	Nelda Luce Blair	3,788	29.02	
	A.R. Mikhail	1,919	14.70	
	A. Neal Sample	264	2.02	
✓	Tommy Williams	4,468	34.23	
Turnout		13,052		

Texas House of Representatives
Preceded by Kevin Brady	Member of the Texas House of Representatives from District 15 (The Woodlands); 1997–2003	Succeeded by Rob Eissler
Texas Senate
Preceded by David Bernsen	Texas State Senator from District 4 (The Woodlands); 2003-2014	Succeeded by Brandon Creighton
