= Texas's 4th Senate district =

American legislative district

Texas's 4th State Senate district
Senator
Brett Ligon; R–Montgomery
- Demographics: 59% White; 13.9% Black; 22.9% Hispanic; 3.8% Asian
- Population: 942,938

District 4 of the Texas Senate is a senatorial district that serves all of Chambers county, and portions of Galveston, Harris, Jefferson, and Montgomery counties in the southeastern portion of the state of Texas. The senator for District 4 is Brett Ligon.

== Election history ==
Election history of District 4 from 1992.

=== 2026 (special) ===
Texas special election, 2026: Senate District 4
Party	Candidate	Votes	%	±%
Republican	Brett Ligon	26,068	75.06	+5.12
Democratic	Ron Angeletti	8,662	24.94	−5.12
Majority		17,513	50.43	
Turnout		34,730		
Republican hold				

=== 2022 ===
Texas general election, 2022: Senate District 4
Party	Candidate	Votes	%	±%
Republican	Brandon Creighton (Incumbent)	202,341	69.94	+2.59
Democratic	Misty Bishop	86,946	30.06	−0.13
Majority		115,395	39.88	
Turnout		289,287		
Republican hold				

=== 2020 ===
Texas general election, 2020: Senate District 4
Party	Candidate	Votes	%	±%
Republican	Brandon Creighton (Incumbent)	281,105	67.35	−19.98
Democratic	Jay Stittleburg	126,019	30.19	+30.19
Libertarian	Cameron Brock	10,277	2.46	−10.21
Majority		155,086	37.16	
Turnout		417,401		
Republican hold				

=== 2016 ===
Texas general election, 2016: Senate District 4
Party	Candidate	Votes	%	±%
Republican	Brandon Creighton (Incumbent)	239,869	87.33	+1.08
Libertarian	Jenn West	34,791	12.67	−1.08
Majority		274,660	100.00	
Turnout		250,521		
Republican hold				

=== 2014 (special) ===
2014 Texas State Senate District 4 special runoff election
Party	Candidate	Votes	%	±%
Republican	Brandon Creighton	15,232	67.38	+22.18
Republican	Steve Toth	7,373	32.62	+8.91
Turnout		22,605		
Republican hold				

2014 Texas State Senate District 4 special election
Party	Candidate	Votes	%
Republican	Brandon Creighton	13,716	45.20
Republican	Steve Toth	7,196	23.71
Republican	Gordy Bunch	6,618	21.81
Republican	Michael Galloway	2,818	9.29
Turnout		30,348	

=== 2012 ===
Texas general election, 2012: Senate District 4
Party	Candidate	Votes	%	±%
Republican	Tommy Williams (Incumbent)	216,076	86.25	−13.75
Libertarian	Bob Townsend	34,445	13.75	+13.75
Majority		250,521	100.00	
Turnout		250,521		
Republican hold				

=== 2008 ===
Texas general election, 2008: Senate District 4
Party	Candidate	Votes	%	±%
Republican	Tommy Williams (Incumbent)	203,367	100.00	
Majority		203,367	100.00	
Turnout		203,367		
Republican hold				

=== 2004 ===
Texas general election, 2004: Senate District 4
Party	Candidate	Votes	%	±%
Republican	Tommy Williams (Incumbent)	176,464	100.00	+36.47
Majority		176,464	100.00	+72.93
Turnout		176,464		+15.30
Republican hold				

=== 2002 ===
Texas general election, 2002: Senate District 4
Party	Candidate	Votes	%	±%
Republican	Tommy Williams	97,237	63.53	+18.69
Democratic	Mike Smith	55,808	36.47	−18.69
Majority		41,429	27.07	+16.76
Turnout		153,045		+10.28
Republican gain from Democratic				

Republican primary runoff, 2002: Senate District 4
Candidate		Votes	%	±
	Michael Galloway	5,320	46.11	+11.32
✓	Tommy Williams	6,218	53.89	+8.69
Majority		898	0.92	
Turnout		11,538		

Republican primary, 2002: Senate District 4
Candidate		Votes	%	±
	Martin Basaldua	4,571	20.01	
✓	Michael Galloway	7,947	34.79	
✓	Tommy Williams	10,327	45.20	
Turnout		22,845		

=== 1998 ===
Texas general election, 1998: Senate District 4
Party	Candidate	Votes	%	±%
Republican	Michael Galloway (Incumbent)	62,237	44.85	−7.90
Democratic	David Bernsen	76,540	55.15	+7.90
Majority		14,303	10.31	+4.82
Turnout		138,777		−7.64
Democratic gain from Republican				

Republican primary, 1998: Senate District 4
Candidate		Votes	%	±
✓	Michael Galloway (Incumbent)	9,834	53.93	
	Bill Leigh	8,400	46.07	
Majority		1,434	1.87	
Turnout				

=== 1994 ===
Texas general election, 1994: Senate District 4
Party	Candidate	Votes	%	±%
Democratic	Carl A. Parker (Incumbent)	71,102	47.26	−7.31
Republican	Michael Galloway	79,252	52.74	+7.31
Majority		8,240	5.48	−3.65
Turnout		150,264		−28.70
Republican gain from Democratic				

Republican primary, 1994: Senate District 4
Candidate		Votes	%	±
	Jim Alexander	6,862	49.75	
✓	Michael Galloway	6,932	50.25	
Majority		70	0.09	
Turnout		13,794		

=== 1992 ===
Texas general election, 1992: Senate District 4
Party	Candidate	Votes	%	±%
Democratic	Carl A. Parker (Incumbent)	114,999	54.57	
Republican	Michael Galloway	95,741	45.43	
Majority		19,258	9.14	
Turnout		210,740		
Democratic hold				

== District officeholders ==
Legislature	Senator, District 4	Counties in District
1	Joseph Lewis Hogg; Isaac Parker	Houston, Nacogdoches, Rusk
2	Isaac Parker; David Gage	Henderson, Houston, Nacogdoches, Rusk
3	Albert G. Walker; Samuel R. Campbell	Collin, Dallas, Denton, Grayson, Henderson
4	Hart Hardin	Hopkins, Hunt, Kaufman, Van Zandt
5	Malachi W. Allen	Collin, Cooke, Denton, Grayson, Kaufman
6	Malachi W. Allen	Collin, Cooke, Denton, Grayson, Kaufman
7	James W. Throckmorton	Collin, Cooke, Denton, Grayson, Kaufman
8	James W. Throckmorton	Collin, Cooke, Denton, Grayson, Kaufman
9	Lewis F. Casey	Panola, Sabine, Shelby
10	Spearman Holland	Panola, Sabine, Shelby
11	James A. Truitt	Panola, Sabine, Shelby
12	E. Pettit	Anderson, Henderson, Van Zandt
13	Thomas J. Word	Anderson, Henderson, Van Zandt
14	Winfield B. Stirman	Anderson, Henderson, Kaufman, Rockwall, Van Zandt
15	Walter Riptoe	Harrison
16	Walter Riptoe	Harrison
17	Robert L. Hightower	Harrison
18	John A. Peacock	Bowie, Cass, Marion, Morris, Titus
19	John A. Peacock	Bowie, Cass, Marion, Morris, Titus
20	William Thomas Armistead	Bowie, Cass, Marion, Morris, Titus
21	William Thomas Armistead	Bowie, Cass, Marion, Morris, Titus
22	Lucius Whatley; Henry F. O'Neal	Bowie, Cass, Marion, Morris, Titus
23	James D. Woods	Cooke, Grayson
24	James D. Woods	Cooke, Grayson
25	James D. Woods	Cooke, Grayson
26	Calhoun L. Potter	Cooke, Grayson
27	Calhoun L. Potter	Cooke, Grayson
28	James L. Harbison	Cooke, Grayson
29	James L. Harbison	Cooke, Grayson
30	James L. Harbison	Cooke, Grayson
31	Robert E. Cofer	Cooke, Grayson
32	Robert E. Cofer	Cooke, Grayson
33	Silas B. Cowell	Cooke, Grayson
34	Silas B. Cowell	Cooke, Grayson
35	George W. Dayton	Cooke, Grayson
36	George W. Dayton	Cooke, Grayson
37	Dan S. McMillin	Cooke, Grayson
38	Dan S. McMillin	Cooke, Grayson
39	Henry F. Triplett	Hardin, Jefferson, Liberty, Orange
40	Henry F. Triplett; Wilfred Roy Cousins, Sr.	Hardin, Jefferson, Liberty, Orange
41	Wilfred Roy Cousins, Sr.	Hardin, Jefferson, Liberty, Orange
42	Wilfred Roy Cousins, Sr.	Hardin, Jefferson, Liberty, Orange
43	Wilfred Roy Cousins, Sr.	Hardin, Jefferson, Liberty, Orange
44	Allan Shivers	Hardin, Jefferson, Liberty, Orange
45	Allan Shivers	Hardin, Jefferson, Liberty, Orange
46	Allan Shivers	Hardin, Jefferson, Liberty, Orange
47	Allan Shivers	Hardin, Jefferson, Liberty, Orange
48	Allan Shivers	Hardin, Jefferson, Liberty, Orange
49	Allan Shivers	Hardin, Jefferson, Liberty, Orange
50	Wilfred Roy Cousins, Jr.	Hardin, Jefferson, Liberty, Orange
51	Wilfred Roy Cousins, Jr.	Hardin, Jefferson, Liberty, Orange
52	Jep Fuller	Hardin, Jefferson, Liberty, Orange
53	Jep Fuller	Jefferson, Orange
54	Jep Fuller	Jefferson, Orange
55	Jep Fuller	Jefferson, Orange
56	Jep Fuller	Jefferson, Orange
57	Jep Fuller	Jefferson, Orange
58	D. Roy Harrington	Jefferson, Orange
59	D. Roy Harrington	Jefferson, Orange
60	D. Roy Harrington	Jefferson, Orange
61	D. Roy Harrington	Jefferson, Orange
62	D. Roy Harrington	Jefferson, Orange
63	D. Roy Harrington	Chambers, Jefferson, Liberty, Orange
64	D. Roy Harrington	Chambers, Jefferson, Liberty, Orange
65	Carl A. Parker	Chambers, Jefferson, Liberty, Orange
66	Carl A. Parker	Chambers, Jefferson, Liberty, Orange
67	Carl A. Parker	Chambers, Jefferson, Liberty, Orange
68	Carl A. Parker	All of Chambers, Jefferson, Liberty, Orange. Portions of Galveston, Harris, Montgomery
69	Carl A. Parker	All of Chambers, Jefferson, Liberty, Orange. Portions of Galveston, Harris, Montgomery
70	Carl A. Parker	All of Chambers, Jefferson, Liberty, Orange. Portions of Galveston, Harris, Montgomery
71	Carl A. Parker	All of Chambers, Jefferson, Liberty, Orange. Portions of Galveston, Harris, Montgomery
72	Carl A. Parker	All of Chambers, Jefferson, Liberty, Orange. Portions of Galveston, Harris, Montgomery
73	Carl A. Parker	All of Chambers, Jefferson, Liberty, Orange. Portions of Galveston, Harris, Montgomery
74	Michael L. Galloway	All of Chambers, Jefferson, Liberty, Orange. Portions of Galveston, Harris, Montgomery
75	Michael L. Galloway	All of Chambers, Jefferson, Liberty, Orange. Portions of Galveston, Harris, Montgomery
76	David Bernsen	All of Chambers, Jefferson, Liberty, Orange. Portions of Galveston, Harris, Montgomery
77	David Bernsen	All of Chambers, Jefferson, Liberty, Orange. Portions of Galveston, Harris, Montgomery
78	Tommy Williams	All of Liberty, Orange. Portions of Chambers, Harris, Jefferson, Montgomery
79	Tommy Williams	All of Liberty, Orange. Portions of Chambers, Harris, Jefferson, Montgomery
80	Tommy Williams	All of Liberty, Orange. Portions of Chambers, Harris, Jefferson, Montgomery
81	Tommy Williams	All of Liberty, Orange. Portions of Chambers, Harris, Jefferson, Montgomery
82	Tommy Williams	All of Liberty, Orange. Portions of Chambers, Harris, Jefferson, Montgomery
83	Tommy Williams; Brandon Creighton	All of Chambers; Portions of Galveston, Harris, Jefferson, Montgomery
84	Brandon Creighton	All of Chambers; Portions of Galveston, Harris, Jefferson, Montgomery
85	Brandon Creighton	All of Chambers; Portions of Galveston, Harris, Jefferson, Montgomery
86	Brandon Creighton	All of Chambers; Portions of Galveston, Harris, Jefferson, Montgomery
87	Brandon Creighton	All of Chambers; Portions of Galveston, Harris, Jefferson, Montgomery
88	Brandon Creighton	All of Chambers; Portions of Galveston, Harris, Jefferson, Montgomery
89	Brandon Creighton	All of Chambers; Portions of Galveston, Harris, Jefferson, Montgomery
