= Brandon Creighton =

American attorney and politician

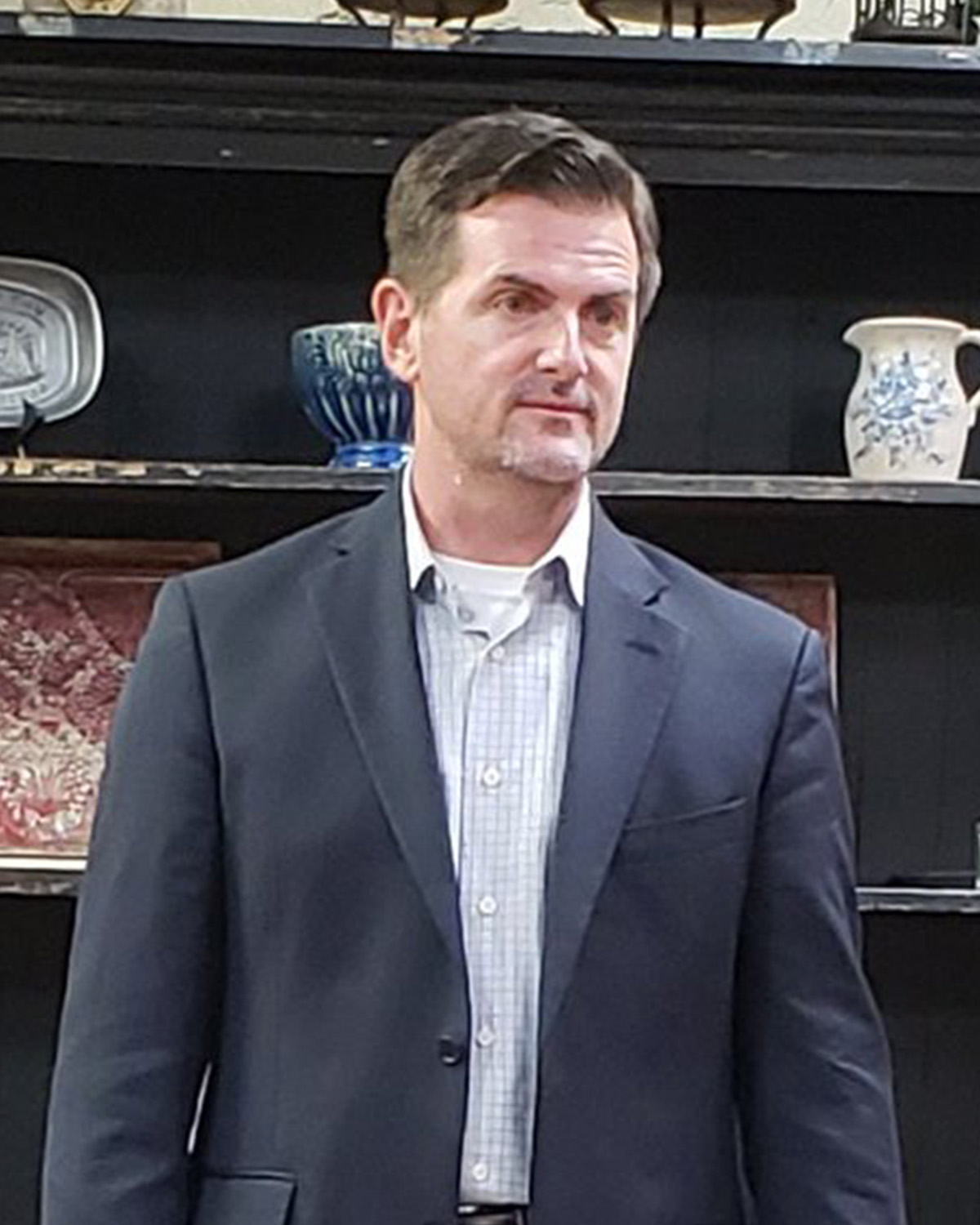
- Creighton in 2018

6th Chancellor of the Texas Tech University System
- Incumbent
- Assumed office November 19, 2025
- Preceded by: Tedd L. Mitchell

President pro tempore of the Texas Senate
- In office January 14, 2025 – June 2, 2025
- Preceded by: Charles Schwertner
- Succeeded by: Charles Perry

Member of the Texas Senate from the 4th district
- In office August 26, 2014 – October 2, 2025
- Preceded by: Tommy Williams
- Succeeded by: Brett Ligon

Majority Leader of the Texas House of Representatives
- In office January 15, 2013 – August 26, 2014
- Preceded by: Myra Crownover (acting)
- Succeeded by: Cindy Burkett (acting)

Member of the Texas House of Representatives from the 16th district
- In office January 9, 2007 – August 26, 2014
- Preceded by: Ruben Hope
- Succeeded by: Will Metcalf

Personal details
- Born: Charles Brandon Creighton; August 5, 1970 (age 56) Montgomery County, Texas, U.S.
- Party: Republican
- Children: 2
- Education: University of Texas, Austin (BA); Oklahoma City University (JD)
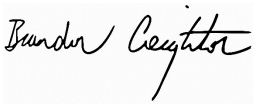
- Signature
- Website: Office of the Chancellor

Charles Brandon Creighton (born August 5, 1970) is an American lawyer, politician, and academic administrator who has served as the chancellor of the Texas Tech University System since 2025. A member of the Republican Party, he previously represented the 4th district in the Texas Senate from 2014 to 2025, and the 16th district in the Texas House of Representatives from 2007 to 2014. Creighton served as president pro tempore of the Texas Senate in 2025.

== Early life, education, and career ==
Creighton was born in Conroe, Texas, to Patricia (née Kincannon) and Morris Creighton. He is the youngest of their three children. He is a long-term member of the First Baptist Church of Conroe. He is an eighth-generation Montgomery County resident, where he resides with his family. Creighton graduated from Conroe High School, and holds a Bachelor of Arts degree in economics and government from the University of Texas at Austin and a Juris Doctor from Oklahoma City University School of Law in Oklahoma City, Oklahoma.

Creighton served as vice president and general counsel of the Signorelli Company, a home and office building development firm in Conroe. He was also a rancher.

== Texas House of Representatives ==
Creighton's first campaign was for the Texas House District 16 in 2002 (based entirely in suburban Montgomery County, near Houston in the southeastern portion of the state). He lost to the incumbent, attorney Ruben W. Hope Jr., 6,126 (55.6 percent) to 4,884 (44.4 percent). In 2006, Hope decided to retire and not seek re-election.

In 2006, after Hope's decision to retire, Creighton joined two intra-party rivals, Dale Inman and Vicky Rudy, in the Republican primary. Creighton won the Republican nomination for House District 16 with 56.6 percent of the vote. In the 2006 general election, Creighton defeated Democrat Pat Poland, 23,945 (75 percent) to 7,963 (25 percent). After first winning the seat in 2006, Creighton faced no further primary or general election opponents.

=== Tenure ===
While serving in the Texas House of Representatives for the 80th legislative session, Creighton was appointed to serve as vice chair of the General Investigating and Ethics Committee, vice chair of the Local Government Ways and Means Committee, and member of the Natural Resources and State Water Funding Committee.

Creighton ran unopposed in 2008, and won re-election with 49,263 votes.

In 2009, during the 81st Texas legislative session, Creighton was appointed to serve as a member of the Appropriations Committee, the Calendars Committee, General Investigating and Ethics and Natural Resources.

Creighton again did not draw a challenger in the 2010 election, and was re-elected for a third term to the Texas House of Representatives.

In 2011, Creighton served as chair of the Committee on State Sovereignty, vice chair of General Investigating and Ethics, and was appointed to serve on the natural resources, pensions, and investments and financial services committees. He was also appointed to the Medicaid Reform Waiver Legislative Oversight Committee and Texas Response to Sequestration Interim Committee.

== Texas Senate ==
On October 3, 2013, State Senator Tommy Williams said he would not run again in the State Senate Republican primary election scheduled for March 4, 2014.

In May 10, 2014, special election to fill the Senate seat that Williams left, Creighton came in first place with 45 percent of the vote. Creighton received 45.2 percent, Toth 23.7 percent, Bunch 21.8 percent, and Galloway 9.3 percent. Creighton and Toth faced other in a runoff election on August 5, 2014.

Creighton won the August 5, 2014, special election runoff for the District 4 seat in the Texas Senate, 67 to 33 percent, over fellow former state representative Republican Steve Toth of The Woodlands.

Rice University political science professor Mark Jones said both Creighton and Toth "are significantly more conservative than Williams."

=== Tenure ===
On January 11, 2019, Creighton filed Senate Bill 345 with the 86th legislature and entitled it the Jones Forest Preservation Act ("Jones Forest Act"). The Jones Forest Act protects the 1,722 acre William Goodrich Jones State Forest from development. In 2018, Texas A&M University suggested that the university would develop a Texas A&M campus on the land, which sits next to The Woodlands, Texas. Neighborhood associations in the area complained that the development would add to traffic congestion and eliminate a forest that has been part of Texas heritage since 1923.

In January 2023, during the 88th Texas legislative session, Creighton was appointed to serve as chairman of the Education Committee of the Senate and as Chair of the Higher Education Subcommittee. He was also appointed as a member of various committees, which included Business & Commerce, Finance, Jurisprudence, and the special committee on Redistricting.

== Political positions ==
=== Abortion ===
In 2017, he sponsored House Bill 214 in the state senate, which limited insurance coverage for abortion procedures in Texas. This law bans private and public health insurance plans from offering coverage for abortion except through the purchase of an optional rider, which insurance companies, HMOs, and employers are not required to provide and which must be purchased prior to pregnancy.

=== Civil liberties ===
In 2025, Creighton authored SB 2972 in response to Gaza war protests at universities around the state. The law regulates campus speech and protests by prohibiting encampments, sound amplification during class hours, and expressive activities between 10:00 p.m. and 8:00 a.m. or at anytime during the final two weeks of a semester, alongside granting governing boards authority to designate public forums. Following lawsuits filed by free speech organizations on behalf of student groups, United States District Judge David Alan Ezra issued a preliminary injunction blocking the law's enforcement in October 2025, finding its restrictions likely violated the First Amendment.

=== Confederate monuments ===
In 2017, Creighton introduced legislation, SB 112, which would forbid local governments from moving or changing memorials that have stood on public lands for more than 40 years. Monuments older than 20 years and less than 40 years old could be moved only with legislative approval, and under the legislation those monuments would need to be placed in "a prominent location." Monuments less than 20 years old could be moved if approved by the Texas legislature, the Texas Historical Commission, or the State Preservation Board.

The measure would prevent San Antonio officials from removing the obelisk statue of an unnamed Confederate soldier in the downtown Travis Park.

=== LGBTQ rights ===
In 2019, Creighton sponsored SB 15, which weakens anti-discrimination laws passed by Texas cities. Creighton said it stood for "Texas values."

In 2025, Creighton sponsored SB 12, which requires parental consent for students to join school clubs, and a ban on school clubs which are "based on sexual orientation or gender identity."

=== Diversity, equity, and inclusion ===
In 2023, Creighton authored SB 17 which prohibited diversity, equity, and inclusion activities at Texas public institutions of higher education. This bill resulted in the termination of programs such as the multicultural engagement, support for undocumented students, and gender & sexuality centers. Additionally, hundreds of jobs were slashed across Texas public colleges and universities in response. Creighton also authored SB 37, a bill which "drastically limit[s] how the state's public universities teach their students about history, race and inequality."

=== Border wall ===
In 2025, Creighton filed a bill to allow the state to use eminent domain to seize land to build the border wall. The bill died in committee.

== Texas Tech University System chancellorship ==
In September 2025, Texas Tech University System Board of Regents chair Cody Campbell stated that Creighton was the sole finalist to become chancellor of the university system.

In August 2026, The New York Times reported that Creighton's tenure had featured widespread censorship of topics viewed as left-wing from college curriculum, and that some material chosen for censorship involved the use of artificial intelligence. It reported that he had ordered "closures of programs centered on sexual orientation or gender identity, required the recognition of only two sexes and outlawed student dissertations on gender identity" and mandated all professors submit their courses for review. The Times reported that courses on the Holocaust were changed to a graduate course owing to gay and bisexual men being targeted by the Nazis, and that professors reported they had self-censored content such as teaching certain aspects of Viking mythology owing to gender-changing gods like Loki and Odin.

== Election results ==
2022 general election for Texas Senate, 4th district

General election results, November 8, 2022
Party	Candidate	Votes	%
Republican	Brandon Creighton	201,917	69.97
Democratic	Misty Bishop	86,652	30.03
Total votes		288,569	100

2020 general election for Texas Senate, 4th district

General election results, November 3, 2020
Party	Candidate	Votes	%
Republican	Brandon Creighton	281,105	67.35
Democratic	Jason "Jay" Stittleburg	126,019	30.19
Libertarian	Cameron Brock	10,277	2.46
Total votes		417,401	100

2016 general election for Texas Senate, 4th district

General election results, November 8, 2016
Party	Candidate	Votes	%
Republican	Brandon Creighton	239,869	87.33
Libertarian	Jenn West	34,791	12.67
Total votes		274,660	100

2014 Special Election

Republican special election results, May 10, 2014
Party	Candidate	Votes	%
Republican	Brandon Creighton	13,705	45.18
Republican	Steve Toth	7,193	23.71
Republican	Gordy Bunch	6,612	21.80
Republican	Michael Galloway	2,818	9.29
Total votes		30,328	100

2006 general election for Texas Representative, 16th district

General election results, November 7, 2006
Party	Candidate	Votes	%
Republican	Brandon Creighton	23,945	75.04
Democratic	Pat Poland	7,963	24.96
Total votes		31,908	100

Texas House of Representatives
Preceded by Myra Crownover; Acting	Majority Leader of the Texas House of Representatives; 2013–2014	Succeeded by Cindy Burkett; Acting
Texas Senate
Preceded by Charles Schwertner	President pro tempore of the Texas Senate; 2025	Succeeded by Charles Perry
