= Michael Galloway (politician) =

American politician

Member of the Texas Senate from the 4th district
- In office 1995–1999
- Preceded by: Carl A. Parker
- Succeeded by: David Bernsen

Personal details
- Born: March 3, 1965 (age 61)
- Party: Republican

Michael L. "Mike" Galloway (born March 3, 1965) is previously a Republican member of the Texas Senate representing District 4. Galloway defeated Democratic incumbent Carl Parker and became the first Republican to hold the seat since Reconstruction.

== Biography ==
Galloway is a fifth generation Texan who was born in 1965 and grew up on a small farm near Tomball. By age 16, he was working as a roustabout and a roughneck in the oil fields of Southeast Texas. While still in high school, he began work as an independent oil and gas contractor, and in 1989, at the age of 24, he founded Galloway Energy, an oil and gas production company based in Montgomery County, Texas.

In 1992, at the age of 27, Galloway decided to run against the 30-year incumbent Democrat, Senator Carl Parker. Unsuccessful in his first race, he managed a victory against Parker in 1994.

As State Senator, Galloway served as Vice-Chairman of the Committee on Intergovernmental Relations and as a member of the Senate Committees on Health & Human Services, Education, and State Affairs, as well as the Special Committee on Auto Emissions and the Special Interim Committee on Annexation.

In 1997, Galloway supported SB 1748, requiring voter identification at polling places.

Galloway currently resides in Magnolia, Texas with his wife, Angela. They have two children.

== Election of 2014 ==
Galloway ran for the District 4 seat, a seat he previously held in the 1990s, in the Texas Senate, vacated in the fall of 2013 by the resignation of Republican Tommy Williams of The Woodlands, who accepted a position with Texas A&M University in College Station.

Galloway faced an intraparty battle for the Senate vacancy from the District 15 Representative Steve Toth of The Woodlands, the District 16 Representative Brandon Creighton of Conroe, and Gordy Bunch, who serves on The Woodlands township council.

In the May 10, 2014, special election Creighton came in first place with 45% of the vote. Creighton received 45.2%, Toth 23.7%, Bunch 21.8%, and Galloway 9.3%. Creighton and Toth faced other in a runoff election on August 5, 2014.

== Election results ==
=== 1998 ===
Republican primary, 1998: Senate District 4
Candidate		Votes	%	±
✓	Michael Galloway (Incumbent)	9,834	53.93	
	Bill Leigh	8,400	46.07	
Majority		1,434	1.87	
Turnout				

=== 1994 ===
Texas general election, 1994: Senate District 4
Party	Candidate	Votes	%	±%
Democratic	Carl A. Parker (Incumbent)	71,102	47.26	−7.31
Republican	Michael L. Galloway	79,252	52.74	+7.31
Majority		8,240	5.48	−3.65
Turnout		150,264		−28.70
Republican gain from Democratic				

Republican primary, 1994: Senate District 4
Candidate		Votes	%	±
	Jim Alexander	6,862	49.75	
✓	Michael L. Galloway	6,932	50.25	
Majority		70	0.09	
Turnout		13,794		
