= Mark Keough =

American politician

Mark James Keough
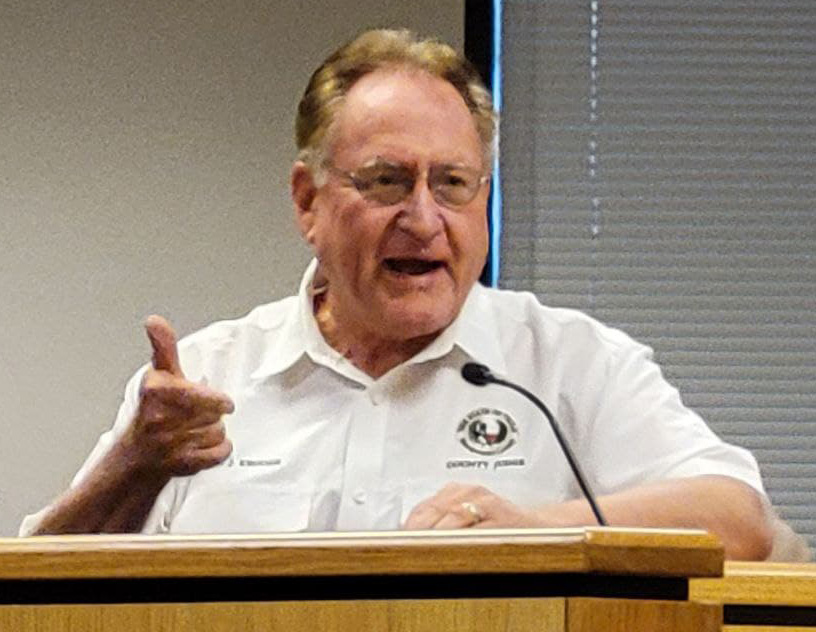
- Keough in 2021

Montgomery County Judge
- Incumbent
- Assumed office January 1, 2019
- Preceded by: Craig Doyal

Member of the Texas House of Representatives from the 15th district
- In office January 13, 2015 – December 31, 2018
- Preceded by: Steve Toth
- Succeeded by: Steve Toth

Personal details
- Born: September 30, 1953 (age 73)
- Party: Republican
- Spouse: Kimberly Keough
- Children: 4
- Education: Cedarville University; Dallas Theological Seminary; Grace Theological Seminary
- Occupation: Christian pastor, radio host, educator Automobile sales manager
- Website: Office website Campaign website

Mark James Keough (born September 30, 1953) is a former American businessman, Christian pastor, radio host, educator, and politician serving as the County judge (Note: In Texas, the position of county judge is a county's elected chief executive officer, not a judicial role.) of Montgomery County, Texas since 2019. A member of the Republican Party, he served as a member of the Texas House of Representatives from 2015 to 2018.

== Background ==
Keough received a bachelor's degree from Cedarville University, a private institution in Cedarville, Ohio. He obtained master's degrees from Dallas Theological Seminary and Grace Theological Seminary in Winona Lake, Indiana. He also attended the University of Cincinnati in Cincinnati, Ohio. For more than two decades, Keough was engaged in automobile sales, including fourteen years as the general sales manager of Northside Lexus in north Harris County. He left the automobile business to establish Mark Keough Ministries, which includes the Pathfinders Fellowship of The Woodlands. He used to be a pastor of The Woodlands Bible Church and he was the headmaster of a private Christian school.

== Political life ==
=== Texas House district 15 ===
On March 4, 2014, Keough won the Republican nomination to replace one-term Representative Steve Toth. Keough polled 57% of the vote against his intra-party opponent, Bruce Tough, who was the chairman of The Woodlands township board of directors, who received 43%. Keough was then unopposed in the heavily Republican district in the November 4, 2014, general election.

Keough is a vocal opponent of separation of church and state, a concept that he does not find in the First Amendment to the United States Constitution.

In 2015, Keough introduced legislation to establish statewide victim-offender mediation for punishments with the goal of reducing recidivism in prisons. A member of the National Rifle Association, Keough opposed gun-free zones in schools and churches. He would allow licensed gun owners to carry weapons in such zones. Keough worked to repeal of margins taxes on small businesses. He worked to upgrade the penalties for the possession of child pornography from a third-degree to a second-degree felony. He proposed the abolition of sanctuary cities, those in which municipalities forbid the use of any local funds to enforce national immigration laws.

Keough was unopposed in both the 2016 Republican primary and the 2016 general election, winning another two year term to the Texas legislature.

=== Montgomery County Judge ===
Keough announced on May 31, 2017, he would not seek re-election to the Texas House but instead run against incumbent Montgomery County Judge Craig Doyal. Doyal and others in Montgomery County were indicted on June 24, 2016, on the charge of conspiring to circumvent the Texas Open Meetings Act. Doyal has also been accused of misusing county funds to support his re-election and recording campaign videos in county offices in violation of state law. Doyal also had multiple accusations of nepotism, conflicts of interest, and mismanagement pending against him. On March 6, 2018, Keough defeated Doyal in the Republican primary, 57% to 42%. Keough defeated Democrat Jay Stittleburg in the general election held on November 6, 2018, 75% to 25%.

Keough was sworn in as County Judge on January 2, 2019 and in the first court meeting after he took office he reduced his own salary by 12% as he promised to do during his election campaign in his "Contract with Montgomery County."

On May 26, 2019 Keough delivered on his promise contained in his contract with Montgomery County to remove the toll charges from the State Hwy 242 connector ramp with Interstate 45. Keough had previously attempted to reverse the tolls in an April, 2019 Commissioner's Court meeting but was defeated in a 3-2 vote. This was only the 2nd time in recent history of Texas that toll charges had been removed from a public roadway.

== Personal life ==
Keough and his wife, the former Kimberly "Kim" Sparks, have four children.

Keough was charged with a DWI on September 10, 2020. He was driving with zolpidem (also known as Ambien) and amphetamine (also known as Adderall) in his blood. Ambien, a sleep aid and adderall, a medication to treat ADHD, are both commonly prescribed medications used to treat symptoms in adults and children. Keough hit a private individual's car and then hit a police vehicle. Passengers in both vehicles that he hit were injured. The passenger injured stated that he had to receive special treatment for spinal injuries. The deputy constable's spine was injured permanently and he had to resign from service. Both cars Keough hit were totaled. Keough's driver's license was ordered suspended for 90 days, he was required to pay a $2,000 fine, and court fees.

== Election results ==
2022 Republican primary election for Montgomery County, Texas County Judge

Republican primary election results, March 1, 2022
Party	Candidate	Votes	%
Republican	Mark Keough	43,621	66.09
Republican	Billy Graff	11,680	17.70
Republican	Sara Countryman	10,699	16.21
Total votes		66,000	100

2018 general election for Montgomery County, Texas County Judge

General election results, November 6, 2018
Party	Candidate	Votes	%
Republican	Mark Keough	139,804	74.64
Democratic	Jason "Jay" Stittleburg	47,499	25.36
Total votes		187,303	100

2018 Republican primary election for Montgomery County, Texas County Judge

Republican primary election results, March 6, 2018
Party	Candidate	Votes	%
Republican	Mark Keough	27,245	57.85
Republican	James C. "Craig" Doyal	19,852	42.15
Total votes		47,097	100

2014 general election for Texas 15th district state representative

Republican primary election results, March 4, 2014
Party	Candidate	Votes	%
Republican	Mark Keough	8,292	57.39
Republican	Bruce C. Tough	6,157	42.61
Total votes		14,449	100

Legal offices
Preceded by Craig Doyal	County Judge of Montgomery County, Texas; 2019–present	Incumbent
Texas House of Representatives
Preceded by Steve Toth	Member of the Texas House of Representatives from the 15th district 2015–2019	Succeeded by Steve Toth
