= Texas's 16th House of Representatives district =

American legislative district

Texas's 16th State House of Representatives district
Representative
Will Metcalf; R–Montgomery
- Demographics: 59.9% White; 7.5% Black; 28.1% Hispanic; 2.2% Asian; 2.3% Other
- Population (2020) • Voting age: 190,052; 143,293

District 16 is a district in the Texas House of Representatives. It was created in the 3rd legislature (1849–1851).

The district has been represented by Republican Will Metcalf since November 4, 2014, upon his re-election to the Texas House in a special election after the prior representative, Brandon Creighton, was elected to the Texas Senate.

As a result of redistricting after the 2020 Federal census, from the 2022 elections the district encompasses the northern portion of Montgomery County. Major cities in the district include all of Cut and Shoot, Montgomery and Panorama Village, and the majority of Conroe.

== List of Representatives ==
Leg.	Portrait	Representative	Party	Term start	Term end	County
3rd		Benjamin F. Selman	?	Nov 5, 1849	Nov 3, 1851	Cherokee
4th		Elisha Everett Lott	?	Nov 3, 1851	Nov 7, 1853	Smith
5th		William H. Hart	?	Nov 7, 1853	Nov 5, 1855	Upshur
6th		Matthew F. Locke	?	Nov 5, 1855	Nov 2, 1857	Upshur
7th		Matthew F. Locke	?	Nov 2, 1857	Nov 7, 1859	Upshur
8th		David B. Culberson	?	Nov 7, 1859	Feb 11, 1861	Upshur
8th		William H. Harrison	?	Mar 20, 1861	Nov 4, 1861	Upshur
9th		Sterling Hendricks	?	Nov 4, 1861	Jan 14, 1862	Harrison
9th		E. A. Blanch	?	Aug 4, 1861	Nov 2, 1863	Harrison
10th		William R. Poag	?	May 9, 1864	May 28, 1864	Panola
11th		Samuel J. Richardson	?	Aug 6, 1866	Feb 7, 1870	Harrison
12th		William Schlottmann	Radical Republican	Feb 8, 1870	Jan 14, 1873	Washington
12th		Charles J. Stockbridge	Radical Republican	Feb 8, 1870	Jan 14, 1873	Washington
13th		Allen W. Wilder	Republican	Jan 14, 1873	Jan 13, 1874	Washington
13th		Charles J. Stockbridge	Republican	Apr 4, 1873	Jan 13, 1874	Washington
14th		John Mitchell	Republican	Jan 13, 1874	Apr 18, 1876	Burleson
14th		G. R. Scott	Republican	Jan 14, 1874	Apr 18, 1876	Burleson
14th		Hermann R. Von Bieberstein	Democratic	Jan 13, 1874	Apr 18, 1876	Washington
15th		Edward P. Marshall	Democratic	Apr 18, 1876	Sep 11, 1876	Gregg
16th		Bluford W. Brown	Democratic	Jan 14, 1879	Jan 11, 1881	Gregg
17th		Felix Johnson McCord	Democratic	Jan 11, 1881	Jan 9, 1883	Gregg
18th		David Thomas Hearne	Unaffiliated	Jan 9, 1883	Jan 13, 1885	Cass
19th		David Thomas Hearne	Democratic	Jan 13, 1885	Jan 11, 1887	Cass
20th		Lucius Adolphus Whatley	Democratic	Jan 11, 1887	Jan 8, 1889	Cass
21st		Lucius Adolphus Whatley	Democratic	Jan 8, 1889	Jan 13, 1891	Cass
22nd		Absalom Carter Oliver	Democratic	Jan 13, 1891	Jan 10, 1893	Cass
23rd		Marshall Hiram Gossett	Democratic	Jan 10, 1893	Jan 8, 1895	Kaufman
24th		John Kendall Bumpass	Democratic	Jan 8, 1895	Jan 12, 1897	Kaufman
25th		John Kendall Bumpass	Democratic	Jan 12, 1897	Jan 10, 1899	Kaufman
26th		Nestor Morrow	Democratic	Jan 10, 1899	Jan 8, 1901	Kaufman
27th		Nestor Morrow	Democratic	Jan 8, 1901	Jan 13, 1903	Kaufman
28th		Frank Benton Guinn	Democratic	Jan 13, 1903	Jan 10, 1905	Cherokee
29th		Frank Benton Guinn	Democratic	Jan 10, 1905	Jan 8, 1907	Cherokee
30th		George Butler Terrell	Democratic	Jan 8, 1907	Jan 12, 1909	Cherokee
31st		George Butler Terrell	Democratic	Jan 12, 1909	Jan 10, 1911	Cherokee
32nd		George Butler Terrell	Democratic	Jan 10, 1911	Jan 14, 1913	Cherokee
33rd		John William Campbell	Democratic	Jan 14, 1913	Jan 12, 1915	Galveston
34th		John William Campbell	Democratic	Jan 12, 1915	Jan 9, 1917	Galveston
35th		Robert Lee Pillow Jr.	Democratic	Jan 9, 1917	Dec 8, 1918	Galveston
36th		Leo Cornelius Brady	Democratic	Jan 14, 1919	Jan 11, 1921	Galveston
37th		Leo Cornelius Brady	Democratic	Jan 11, 1921	Jan 9, 1923	Galveston
38th		James Otho Merriman	Democratic	Jan 9, 1923	Jun 21, 1923	Jefferson
38th		Benjamin Edmund Quinn	Democratic	Jan 9, 1923	Jan 13, 1925	Jefferson
39th		James William Kinnear	Democratic	Jan 13, 1925	Jan 11, 1927	Jefferson
39th		Carl Edmund Nicholson	Democratic	Jan 13, 1925	Jan 11, 1927	Jefferson
40th		James William Kinnear	Democratic	Jan 11, 1927	Jan 8, 1929	Jefferson
40th		Carl Edmund Nicholson	Democratic	Jan 11, 1927	Jan 8, 1929	Jefferson
41st		James William Kinnear	Democratic	Jan 8, 1929	Jan 13, 1931	Jefferson
41st		Carl Edmund Nicholson	Democratic	Jan 8, 1929	Jan 13, 1931	Jefferson
42nd		Carl Edmund Nicholson	Democratic	Jan 13, 1931	Jan 10, 1933	Jefferson
42nd		Truman Edgar O'Quinn	Democratic	Jan 13, 1931	Jan 10, 1933	Jefferson
43rd		Harry Lee McKee	Democratic	Jan 10, 1933	Jan 8, 1935	Jefferson
43rd		Carl Edmund Nicholson	Democratic	Jan 10, 1933	Jan 8, 1935	Jefferson
