= William Roy Cousins =

American politician

William Roy "W. R." Cousins

Member of the Texas Senate from the 4th district
- In office January 28, 1929 – January 8, 1935
- Preceded by: Henry F. Triplett
- Succeeded by: Allan Shivers

Member of the Texas Senate from the 14th district
- In office January 14, 1919 – January 13, 1925
- Preceded by: Vinson Allen Collins
- Succeeded by: Richard Saffarrans Bowers

Personal details
- Born: January 26, 1881 Beaumont, Texas, U.S.
- Died: August 30, 1976 (aged 95)
- Party: Democratic
- Children: 2
- Profession: Attorney, judge

William Roy Cousins was a Texas Democratic politician and a member of the Texas Senate. He also served as a school superintendent before becoming a county magistrate judge. He left the bench and entered into private practice in 1934 and worked as an attorney until his death in 1976.

== Family ==
Cousins had two sons, Wilfred Roy Cousins, who would eventually succeed him as a state senator, and Weldon Cousins, who served the state of Louisiana as an assistant attorney general.

== Political career ==
=== Texas Senate ===
Cousins served in the Senate of Texas for 24 years, representing Beaumont and Jefferson Counties.

Among his numerous legislative achievements included the first medical practice act passed in the state of Texas, as well as the creation of the Stephen F. Austin State University in Nacogdoches, Texas, one of four independent public universities in Texas. He also authored and sponsored the bill which authorized the building of the Rainbow Bridge (originally named the Port Arthur-Orange Bridge) between Orange County and Port Arthur.
