= Texas Department of Housing and Community Affairs =

Department of Housing & Community Affairs, Texas

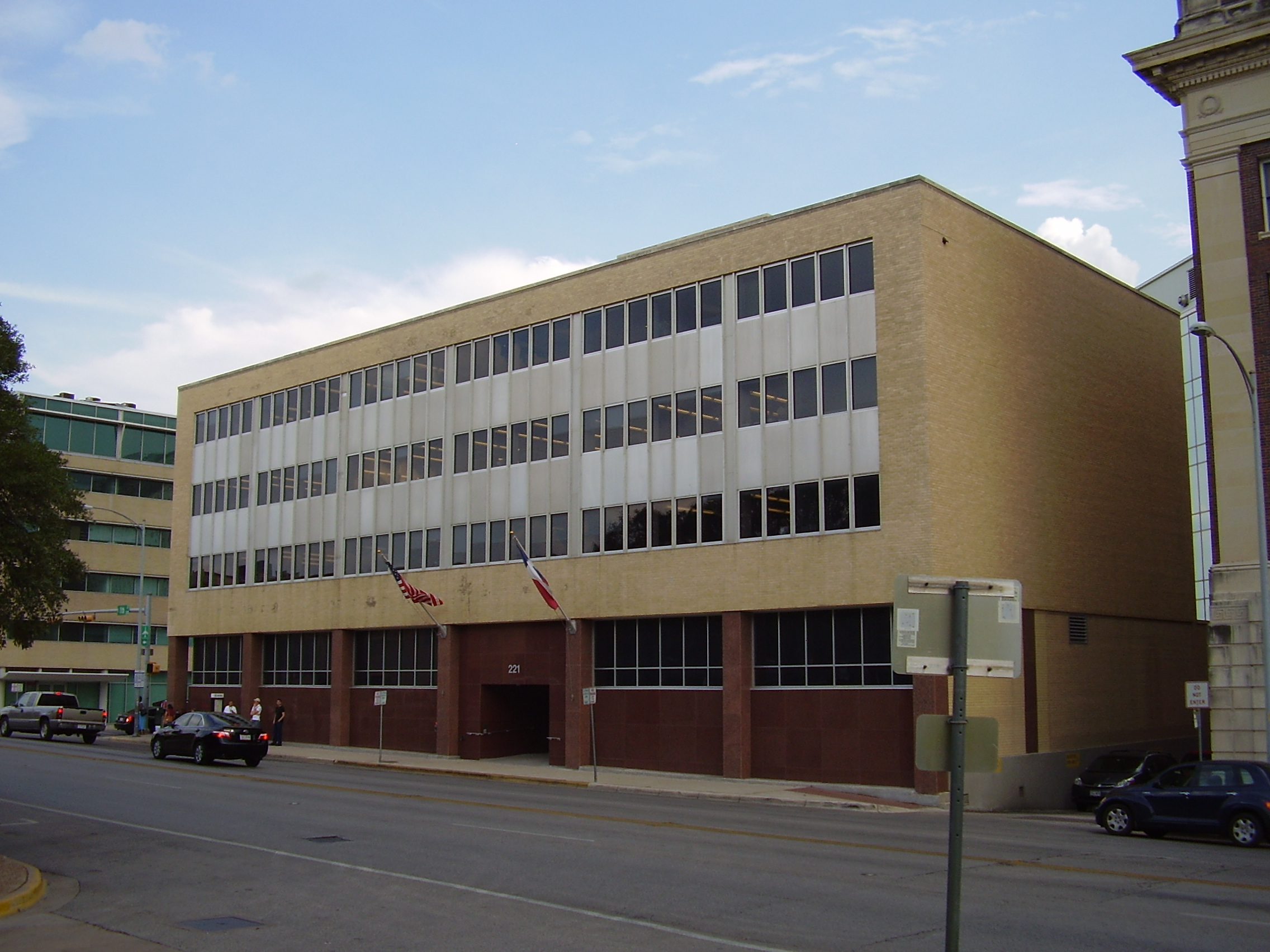
221 East 11th Street, which has offices for Texas Department of Housing and Community Affairs

The Texas Department of Housing and Community Affairs (TDHCA) is the state's lead agency responsible for homeownership, affordable rental housing, community and energy assistance programs, and colonia activities serving primarily low income Texans. The Manufactured Housing Division of TDHCA regulates the manufactured housing industry in Texas. The Department annually administers more than $400 million through for-profit, nonprofit, and local government partnerships to deliver local housing and community-based opportunities and assistance to Texans in need. The department is headquartered at 221 East 11th Street in Austin.

TDHCA was created in 1991 when the Texas Department of Community Affairs (TDCA) and the Texas Housing Agency (THA) were combined.

== History ==
The Texas Urban Development Commission recommended the creation of the Texas Department of Community Affairs (TDCA) in 1970. The recommendation was based on an interim report that sought to prevent "urban issues" among the 73% of Texas residents who lived in urban areas at the time. A bill was introduced in the Texas Senate by Barbara Jordan in 1971 to create a TDCA. The legislation proposed a TDCA that would be tasked to work with cities in Texas to solve problems unique to urban areas, advise the Texas governor, and help coordinate programs throughout Texas. The bill, SB 80, passed out of the Senate 27-4 and went to the Texas House in April 1971. In the House, the bill was handled by Representative Joe Goldman and in May 1971, passed the House by a 135 to 10 vote. SB 80 was then signed into law in June 1971 by Governor Preston Smith, creating the department to be "effective at once." The TDCA was headed by an executive director which was appointed by the Texas governor and had an Advisory Council made up of 12 people who could be considered stakeholders. The first executive director of TDCA was Fritz Lanham, who had previously worked as the city manager of Baytown, Texas. The Texas Legislature expanded the TDCA by authorizing the creation of human resource centers throughout Texas communities.

In March 1979, the Senate introduced SB 296 for the creation of a Texas Housing Agency (THA). The bill in the Senate was proposed and supported by Senator Carl Parker and in the House was supported by Representative Al Price. THA would have a board of nine appointees, selected by the Texas governor and would issue revenue bonds for improving housing in Texas. The bill was passed and signed into law by Governor Bill Clements later in 1979. The agency was led by Earline Jewett.

In 1991, Senator Gonzalo Barrientos introduced a bill to combine the TDCA and the THA into one agency. The bill was sponsored by Representative Sylvester Turner in the House. Governor Ann Richards was interested in creating a combined agency after THA was under investigation and had suffered from allegations of mismanagement. Later in 1991, the 72nd Texas Legislature passed SB 546 to create the Texas Department of Housing and Community Affairs (TDHCA). Richards appointed Richard Moya as acting chief of staff for TDHCA in September 1991. The agency immediately sought public input in September 1991 as well, starting public hearings in El Paso, Texas and then expanding to other Texas cities. In 1993, the legislation was amended by SB 1356.

On September 1, 1992, two programs were transferred to TDHCA from the Texas Department of Human Services: the Low Income Home Energy Assistance Program (LIHEAP) and the Emergency Nutrition and Temporary Emergency Relief Program (ENTERP). Effective September 1, 1995, in accordance with House Bill 785, regulation of manufactured housing was transferred to the Department. In accordance with House Bill 7, effective September 1, 2002, the Community Development Block Grant (CDBG) and Local Government Services programs were transferred to the newly created Office of Rural Community Affairs (ORCA). However, TDHCA, through an interagency contract with ORCA, administers 2.5 percent of the CDBG funds used for the Self-Help Centers along the Texas-Mexico border. Effective September 1, 2002, in accordance with Senate Bill 322, the Manufactured Housing Division became an independent entity administratively attached to TDHCA.

== Agency Mission and Charge ==
TDHCA's mission is as follows: To help Texans achieve an improved quality of life through the development of better communities.

TDHCA accomplishes this mission by administering a variety of housing and community affairs programs. A primary function of TDHCA is to act as a conduit for federal grant funds for housing and community services. However, because several major housing programs require the participation of private investors and private lenders, TDHCA also operates as a housing finance agency.

More specific policy guidelines are provided in §2306.002 of TDHCA's enabling legislation.

1. The legislature finds that:
  1. every resident of this state should have a decent, safe, and affordable living environment;
  2. government at all levels should be involved in assisting individuals and families of low income in obtaining a decent, safe, and affordable living environment; and
  3. the development and diversification of the economy, the elimination of unemployment or underemployment, and the development or expansion of commerce in this state should be encouraged.
2. The highest priority of the department is to provide assistance to individuals and families of low and very low income who are not assisted by private enterprise or other governmental programs so that they may obtain affordable housing or other services and programs offered by the department.

The TDHCA Governing Board and staff are committed to meeting the challenges presented by examining the housing needs and presenting a broad spectrum of housing and community affairs programs based on the input of thousands of Texans. TDHCA's services address a broad spectrum of housing and community affairs issues that include homebuyer assistance, the rehabilitation of single family and multifamily units, rental assistance, the new construction of single family and multifamily housing, special needs housing, transitional housing, and emergency shelters. Community services include energy assistance, weatherization assistance, health and human services, child care, nutrition, job training and employment services, substance abuse counseling, medical services, and emergency assistance.

The Department is primarily a pass-through funding agency that collects funds from federal and state programs to use the combination of resources efficiently. To further the goal of providing a decent, safe, and affordable living environment for families who need assistance, the Department uses a series of competitive programs that focus on obtaining the public policy goals. This distribution is done using a number of techniques.

- Almost all housing development, rehabilitation, and rental assistance related funding is awarded through formal competitive Request for Proposals (RFP) and Notice of Funding Availability (NOFA) processes.
- First time homebuyer and down payment assistance is allocated through a network of participating lenders. Down Payment Assistance programs are all different with certain requirements for each. State or local housing authorities, a non-profit organization, or lender usually set the requirements and conditions for the DPA program. Some programs require you or your loan officer to take a short course on Down Payment Assistance for first time home buyers.
- Community Affairs’ funds are predominantly allocated through a network of community-based organizations who receive their funding on an annual, ongoing basis.

Funding sources for the services listed above include the United States Department of Housing and Urban Development (HUD), Treasury Department, United States Department of Health and Human Services, United States Department of Energy, and State of Texas general revenue funds. With this funding, TDHCA strives to promote sound housing policies; promote leveraging of state and local resources; prevent discrimination; and ensure the stability and continuity of services through a fair, nondiscriminatory, and open process. Recognizing that all the need may not ever be met, the Department looks at where the federal programs and state resources at its disposal could provide the most benefit by managing these limited resources to have the greatest impact.

== Programs and Services ==
=== Consumer Assistance ===
- Homebuyer Assistance Programs
- Energy Assistance Programs
- Rental Assistance Programs
- Manufactured Housing Licensing, Regulating and Titling

=== Community and Nonprofit Assistance Programs ===
The following programs are administered by TDHCA to local governments, nonprofit agencies, and public housing authorities who in turn provide local services to qualifying individuals and families.

- Emergency Shelter Grants Program
- Community Services Block Grant
- Single Family Home Purchase, Repair, and Rental Assistance
- Multifamily (Rental) Housing Assistance
- Housing Acquisition, Rehabilitation, Development Assistance

=== Colonia Assistance Programs ===
- Texas Bootstrap Loan Program
- Contract for Deed Conversion Program
- Colonia Self Help Center Program
- Disaster Recovery Assistance

=== Developer Assistance Programs ===
- Housing Tax Credit Program
- Multifamily Mortgage Revenue Bond Program
