= Steve Toth =

American businessman and politician (born 1960)

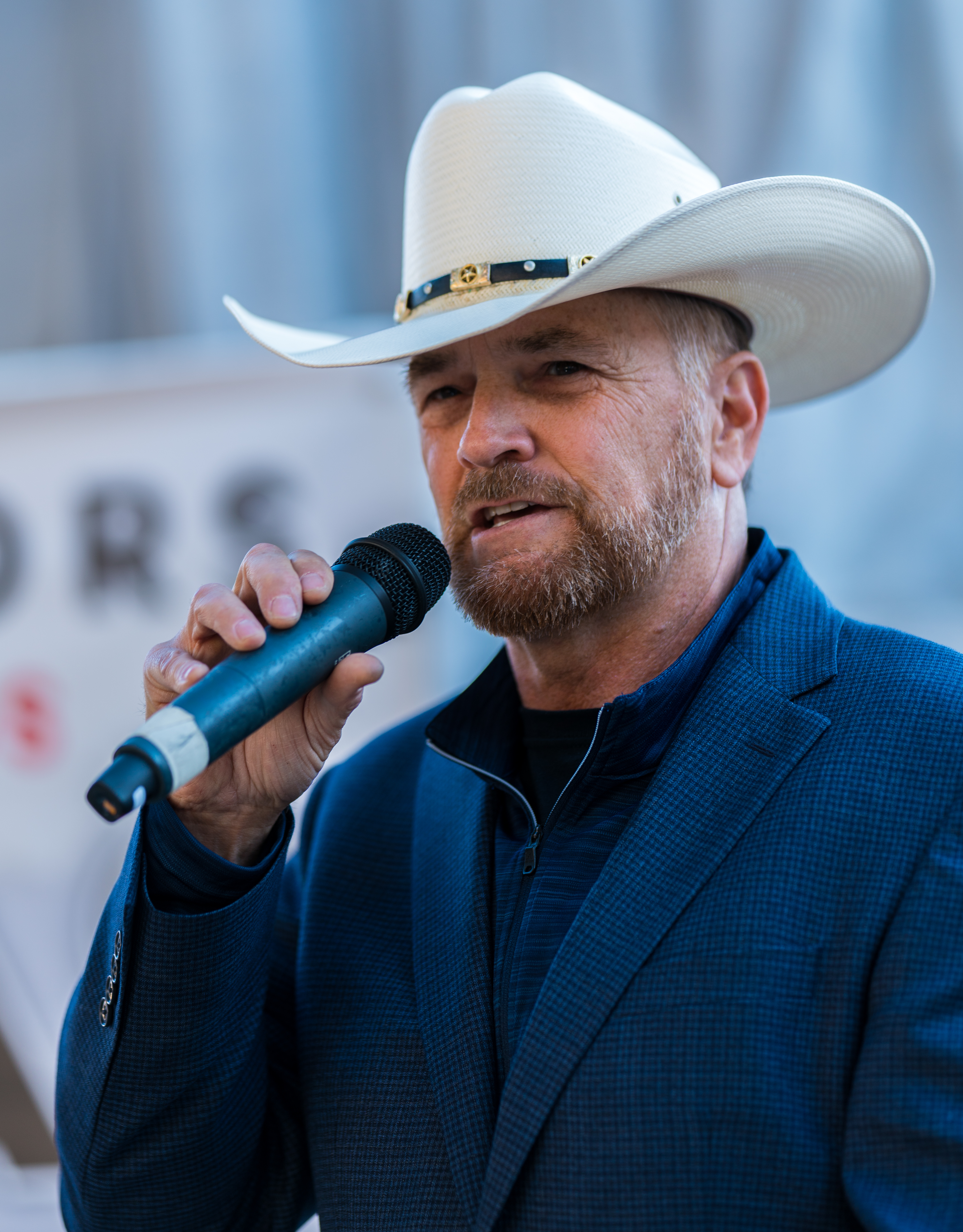
- Toth in 2021

Member-elect of the U.S. House of Representatives from Texas's 2nd district
- Assuming office January 3, 2027
- Succeeding: Dan Crenshaw

Member of the Texas House of Representatives from the 15th district
- Incumbent
- Assumed office January 8, 2019
- Preceded by: Mark Keough
- Succeeded by: Brad Bailey (elect)
- In office January 8, 2013 – January 13, 2015
- Preceded by: Rob Eissler
- Succeeded by: Mark Keough

Personal details
- Born: Steven Hixson Toth; November 29, 1960 (age 65) New York, U.S.
- Party: Republican
- Spouse: Babette Toth
- Children: 3
- Education: Rochester Bible College (attended)
- Website: Campaign website

Steven Hixson Toth (born November 29, 1960) is an American businessman, pastor, and politician serving as a member of the Texas House of Representatives from District 15, The Woodlands area. Toth is also the Representative-elect for Texas's 2nd congressional district, having defeated incumbent representative Dan Crenshaw in the March 2026 Republican primary, and defeating Democrat Shaun Finnie in the general election.

== Early life and education ==
Born and raised in New York, Toth attended Pittsford Mendon High School in suburban Rochester. He also attended Rochester Bible College.

== Career ==
Toth owns Acclaim Pools and My Pool Xpert in The Woodlands. He is a former pastor at Family Life Ministries of the Fellowship of The Woodlands, a congregation now known as The Woodlands Church. He was formerly an elder and teacher at another non-denominational congregation, WoodsEdge Community Church also in The Woodlands, Texas. Toth is also a commentator on the political show FOX Faceoff which appears on Fox 26 Houston.

== Texas House of Representatives ==
Texas House District 15 is based entirely in suburban Montgomery County, centered around The Woodlands. It is part of the Houston Metro area in the southeastern portion of the state.

=== Tenure ===
==== 2012–2014 ====
Toth won the 2012 election to the State House district 15. In February 2013, newly inaugurated Representative Toth was elected by his colleagues to the House Republican Caucus Policy Committee as the East Texas representative on the panel.

In his first legislative session in 2013, Toth authored and carried the CSCOPE Transparency Act in the House (SB-1406). The bill brought the CSCOPE (Common Core) curriculum under the purview of the Texas State Board of Education.

==== Gun legislation ====
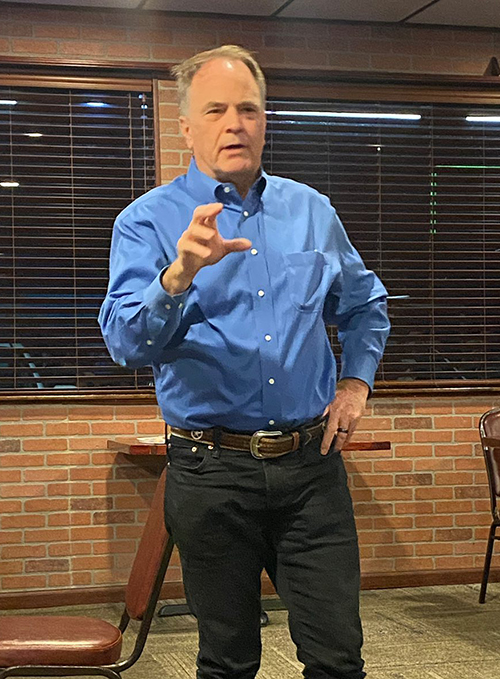
Toth speaking to a fundraising event at a restaurant in Conroe, Texas on November 3, 2025.

He authored the Firearms Protection Act (HB 1076), restricting federal control and regulations of firearms, which made it a Class A misdemeanor to interfere with a Texan's Second Amendment rights. The act also protected Texas' state and local law enforcement officers from violating the U.S. Constitution, and prevented the federal government from targeting certain firearms and accessories with restrictions. Toth received assistance from Texas Attorney General Greg Abbott in drafting the bill. On May 6, 2013, HB 1076 received enough votes to pass in the Texas House but was never approved by the Senate so did not become law. A similar bill, supported by Toth, passed the Texas House (with Toth's support) and the Texas Senate and was signed by Governor Greg Abbott on June 17, 2021.

Toth supports constitutional carry for Texas.

==== 2019–2021 ====
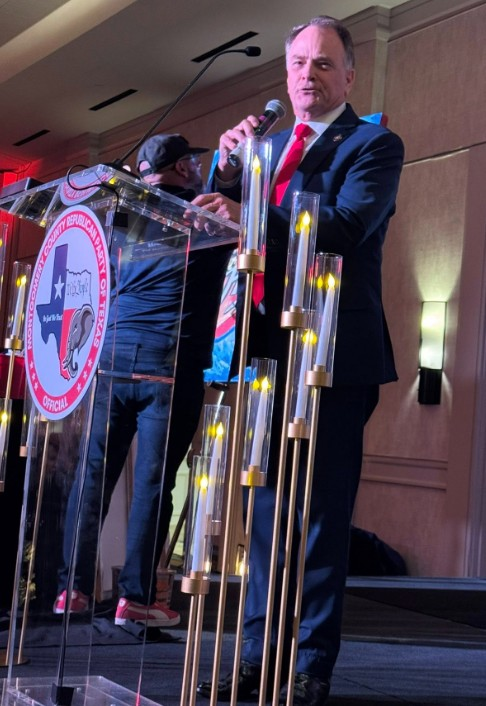
Toth speaking at the Montgomery County Texas Trump Reagan GALA in The Woodlands, Texas on January 17, 2026.

On January 11, 2019, Toth filed House Bill 792 (Senate Bill 345) with the 86th Legislature and entitled it the Jones Forest Preservation Act ("Jones Forest Act"). The Jones Forest Act protects the 1,722-acre William Goodrich Jones State Forest from development. Texas A&M University suggested that the university would develop a Texas A&M campus on the land, which sits next to The Woodlands, Texas. Neighborhood associations in the area complained that the development would add to traffic congestion and eliminate a forest that has been part of Texas heritage since 1923. It was passed by both the Texas House and the Texas Senate and sent to Governor Greg Abbott on May 25, 2019.

In January 2019, he was appointed to the House Appropriations Committee by Texas House Speaker Dennis Bonnen. On January 25, Toth along with Will Metcalf and Cecil Bell filed House Bill 1042 which would require Texas schools and law enforcement agencies to establish active shooter response plans and law enforcement agencies to conduct annual drills while also requiring law enforcement to immediately contain or eliminate a threat.

On February 7, 2019, Toth filed the JD Lambright Local Government Ethics Reform Act (HB-1495), which requires cities, counties, and other political subdivisions statewide to post contracts they have with taxpayer-funded lobbyists and to post how much they are paying the lobbyists. It was filed in the Senate by Brandon Creighton on February 8 as Senate Bill 710. The house bill was passed by both chambers and was sent to the governor for signature on May 29, 2019. Governor Abbott signed the bill into law on June 14, 2019.

In February 2019, Toth co-authored Texas House Bill 1500, which would ban abortions after the detection of an unborn child's heartbeat. He also co-authored Texas House Bill 896, which would prohibit abortion. In March 2019, Toth became a cosponsor of SB 22 which prohibits government entities from providing taxpayer-funded resources (including cash, goods, services, and anything of value) to Planned Parenthood. It was a response to Planned Parenthood's $1-per-year rental agreement with the City of Austin for a clinic. It passed both chambers and was sent to Abbott on May 25, 2019, for signature. The bill was signed into law by Abbott on June 7, 2019.

On March 5, 2019, Toth introduced Texas HB 3145, the School Lunch Bill. It clarifies that each parent, including the non-custodial parent, in a divorce can visit their child during school lunch and school activities, regardless of the possession schedule. It passed both chambers and was sent to the governor on May 28, 2019.

In March 2019, Toth introduced Texas House Bill 2518, which aims to reduce cannabis possession from a Class B to a Class C misdemeanor. To take it down from B to C would remove jail time for simple possession (180 days is the current penalty) and lower the monetary penalty from $2,000 down to $500.

On April 12, 2019, Toth voted for HB 1824 in the 86th legislative session, which helped promote dredging efforts in Harris County—for the sale and taking of sand, gravel, marl, shell, and mudshell, including the use of funds collected from the sale of those materials and the taking of those materials from the San Jacinto River and its tributaries.

On May 16, 2019, Toth voted to support SB 7 in the 86th legislative session, which provided $1.6 billion in flood control projects. This bill was signed by Governor Abbott on June 13, 2019, taking effect immediately.

In August 2020, Toth, along with fellow state representatives Mike Lang, Kyle Biedermann, Bill Zedler, and state senator Bob Hall sued Texas Governor Greg Abbott over a $295 million COVID-19 contact tracing contract Abbott awarded to a small Frisco, Texas technology firm without approval from the Texas legislature. In May 2020, Toth protested Abbott's lockdown order by getting a haircut.

In November 2020, during the 87th Texas legislative session, Toth filed again the Texas Firearm Protection Act (HB 112), basically the same piece of legislation that he originally filed in January 2019. The previous version passed the Texas House with a 100-vote supermajority but died in the Senate. Governor Greg Abbott assisted Toth in writing the bill in 2013 when Abbott was serving as Texas Attorney General. It is also known as the Second Amendment sanctuary bill. It would make any attempt to enforce federal gun laws in Texas void if those laws were not part of Texas law. The bill had 14 co-sponsors including Briscoe Cain, Valoree Swanson, Cecil Bell, and Tony Tinderholt. It was referred to the State Affairs Committee of the House, from which it never progressed. However, a similar bill, House Bill 2622 (by Representative Justin Holland and Senator Bob Hall) passed the Texas House (with Toth's support) and the Texas Senate and was signed by Governor Greg Abbott on June 17, 2021.

Toth was ranked the fourth most conservative House member of the 2021 Texas legislature by Mark Jones, a political science professor at Rice University.

On July 19, 2021, Toth introduced a bill to conduct a forensic audit of the November 2020 election in the 13 counties with the largest populations in Texas, which tend to lean towards the Democratic Party. The bill has been named the Texas Voter Confidence Act. Asked why he did not call for an audit of all counties in the state, Toth argued it would be time-consuming and expensive, and cited the Republican lean of the counties, "What's the point? I mean, all the small counties are red." Election experts said that it did not make sense to specifically exclude Republican-leaning counties if the intent was to detect errors. On September 23, 2021, former President Donald Trump endorsed Toth's House bill 16.

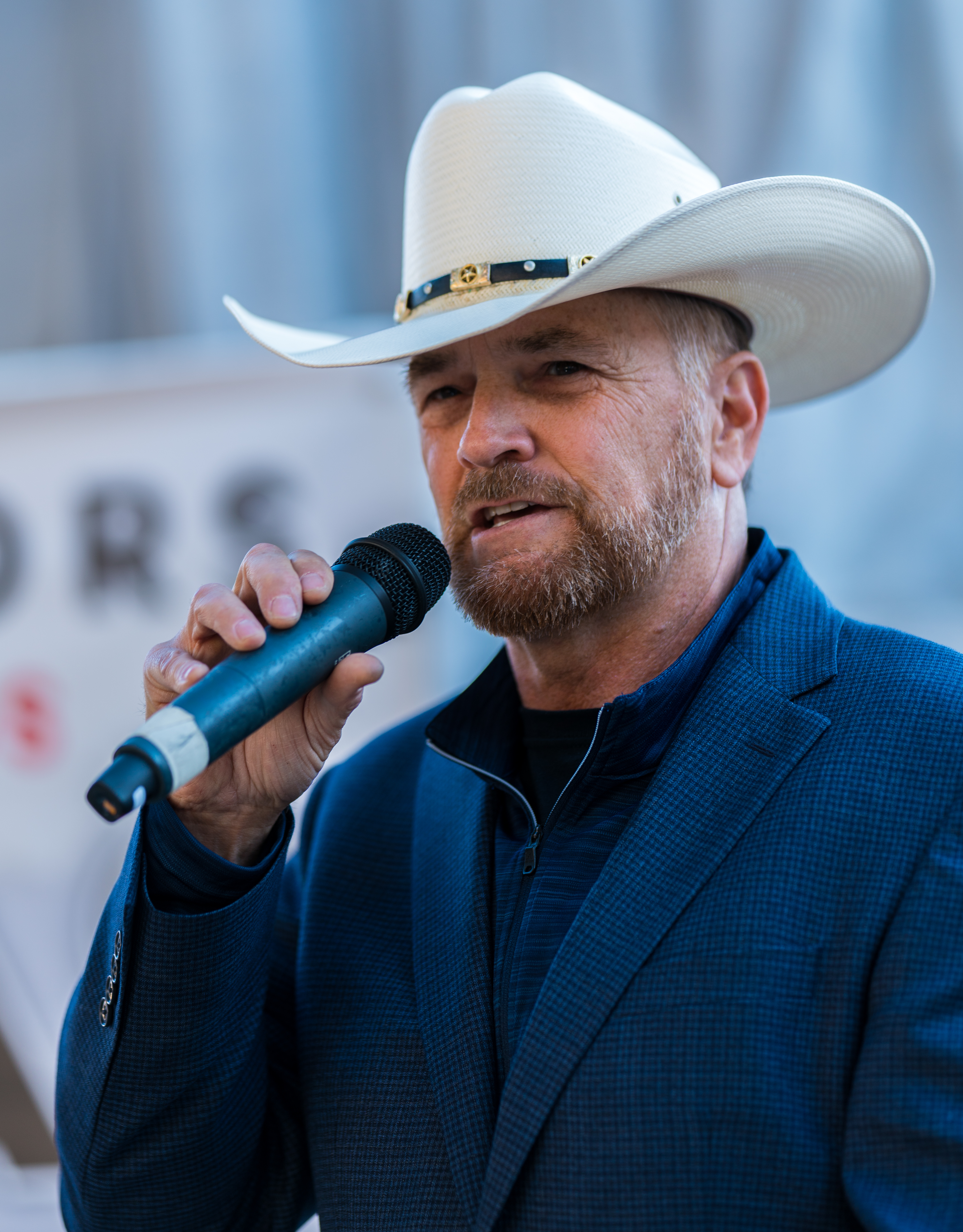
Toth in 2021

==== 2021–present ====
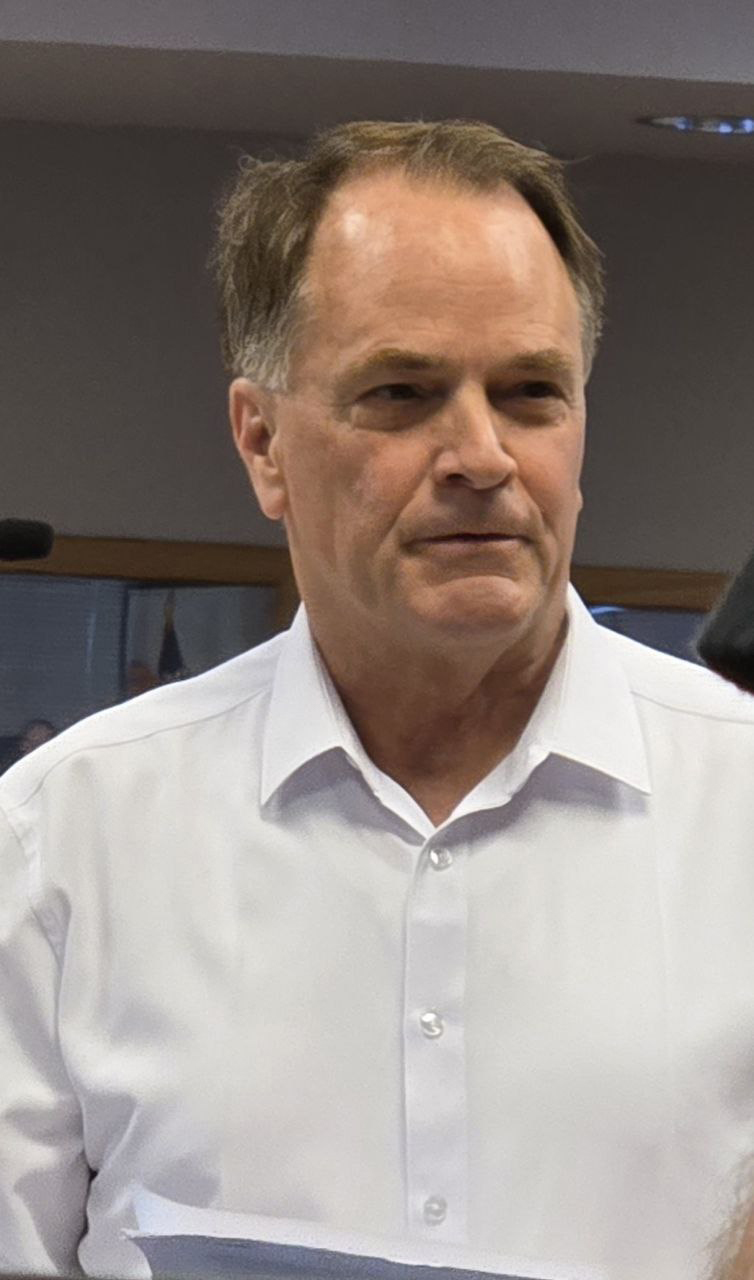
Steve Toth swearing in new Precinct Chairs during a Montgomery County Republican Party meeting in Conroe, Texas on June 3, 2025.

Toth, during the pre-filing period of the Texas legislature, in November 2022, introduced House Bill 41, which would prohibit healthcare providers from receiving professional liability insurance coverage for performing or prescribing certain gender-affirming care for children.

Toth supports a ban on Democrats being given committee chairmanships as long as the Republicans hold the majority of seats.

On February 8, 2023, Toth was appointed to the Appropriations and Corrections committees of the 88th Session. Toth has served on the Appropriations Committee every legislative session since 2019.

On March 7, 2023, Toth filed HB 3928 in the 88th Texas Legislature, which is also known as the Beckley Wilson Act. The Act focuses on public school students with dyslexia, specifically reforming dyslexia services, parental notice, and the rights of parents with students with disabilities. The bill clearly defines dyslexia under the Individuals with Disabilities Education Act. It passed the Texas House on May 22 and passed the Texas Senate on May 23. It was signed by the Governor of Texas, Greg Abbott, on June 10, 2023.

On May 25, 2023, in the 88th Texas legislative session, Toth voted for HB 1540 and championed the amendment that removed Jace Houston as the head of the San Jacinto River Authority, following recommendations of the Sunset Advisory Commission.

On May 27, 2023, Toth voted "no" on the impeachment of Ken Paxton.

In January 2025, Toth introduced HB 2258, the Vulnerable Youth Protection Act, into the 89th Texas legislature, the goal of which was to ban access to social gender transition for children. The bill was sent by Speaker Dustin Burrows to Ken King's committee, which refused to give the bill a hearing—killing the bill. Toth then attached the bill to SB12 through an amendment, with the support of Senator Brandon Creighton. SB12 passed both the Texas House and the Texas Senate and was sent to Texas Governor Greg Abbott for signature on June 3, 2025.

During the 89th session of the Texas legislature, Toth introduced HB 1001, which requires the use of paper ballots in all Texas elections and prohibits the use of electronic voting devices for certain election processes. He also introduced HB 4541, which focuses on the placement of "voting centers" in a county and removes outdated provisions related to consolidated precincts and countywide polling programs. On June 2, 2025, Toth voted no on SB 293 Conference Committee Report on pensions, voting against a legislative pension increase.

Toth was named the third most conservative member of the 89th session of the Texas legislature by Rice University.

=== Elections ===
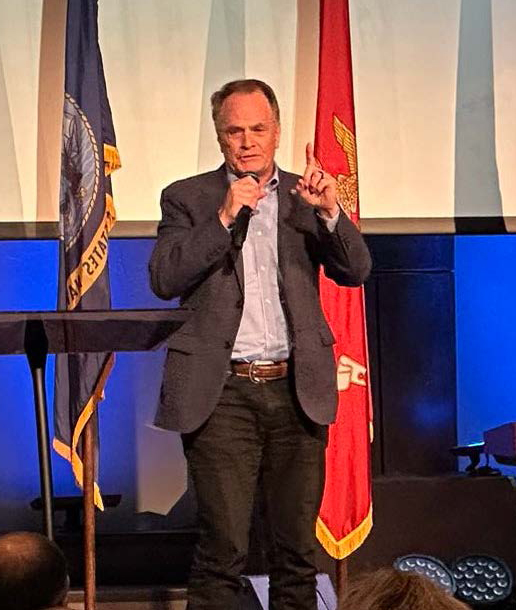
Steve Toth announcing his Congressional campaign for Texas 2nd District at Grace Woodlands Church in Spring, Texas on July 15, 2025.

==== 2012 ====
In the 2012 Republican primary for the District 15 House seat, the more conservative Toth unseated the five-term incumbent, Rob Eissler, 56.5% to 43.5%. In the general election, Toth defeated the Libertarian Party nominee, Sterling Russell, 87% to 13%. No Democrat sought the seat.

==== 2014 ====
On October 3, 2013, State Senator Tommy Williams said he would not run again in the State Senate Republican primary election scheduled for March 4, 2014.

In the May 10, 2014, special election to fill the Senate seat that Williams left, Toth came in second place behind Brandon Creighton. Creighton received 45.2%, Toth 23.7%, Gordy Bunch 21.8%, and Mike Galloway 9.3%.

Toth and Creighton then met in a special election runoff on August 5, 2014. In the special election runoff, Toth was defeated by Creighton 67% to 33% percent. Rice University political science professor Mark Jones said both Creighton and Toth "are significantly more conservative than Williams."

==== 2016 ====
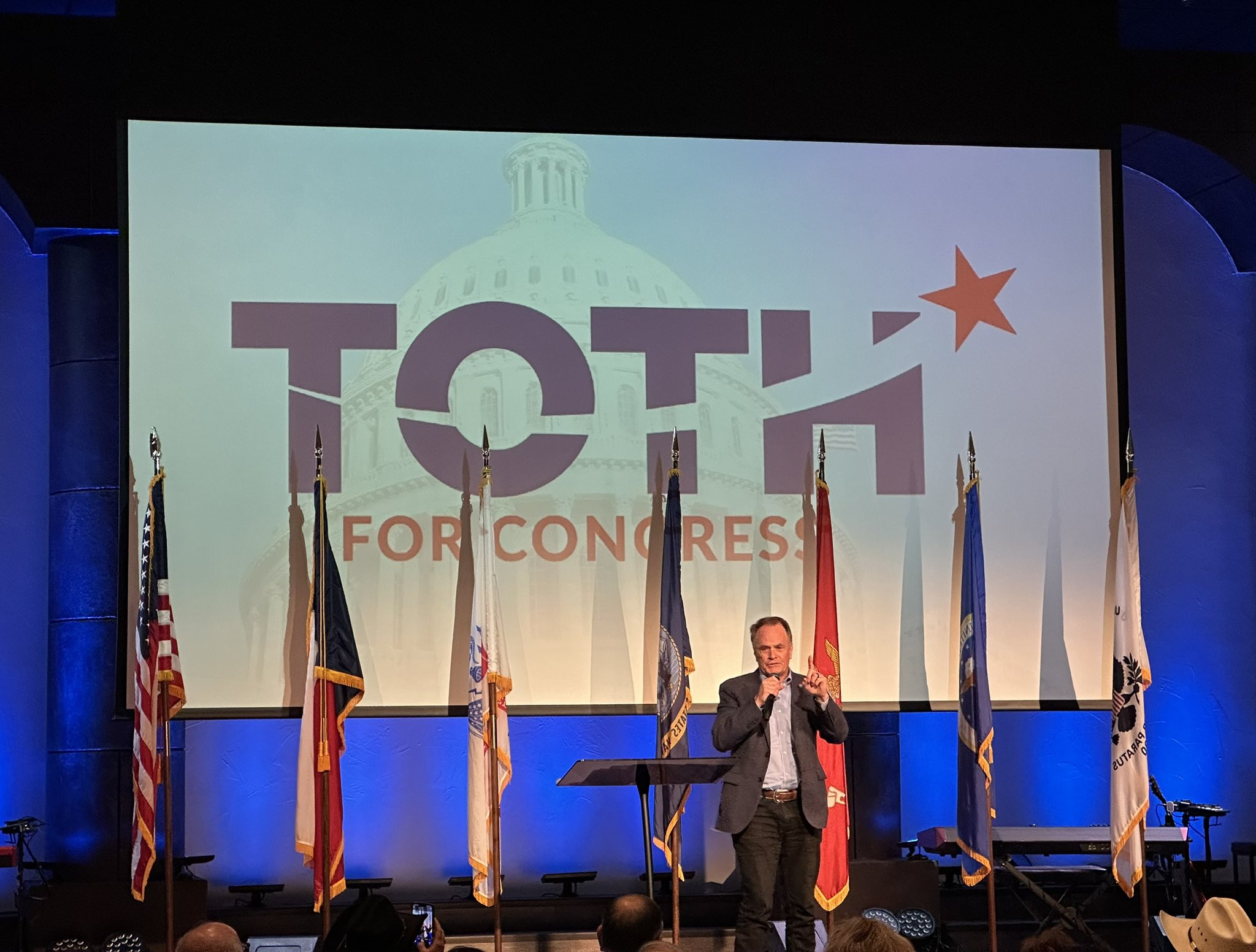
Steve Toth announcing his campaign for Congress at Grace Woodlands Church in Spring, Texas on July 15, 2025.

In November 2015, Toth announced his candidacy for Texas's 8th congressional district seat held at the time by Kevin Brady. In January 2016, Toth received the endorsement of all Tea Party organizations in Montgomery County, Texas. Professor Jones of Rice University stated: "Toth is certainly a more credible challenger than the typical Republican gadfly who is unknown and unfunded."

In the March 1 primary, Toth and two fellow challengers held incumbent Brady to 53 percent of the vote. In 2014, Brady had received 68 percent of the vote in the primary. In 2016, Brady prevailed with 64,745 votes (53.4 percent) to Toth's 45,298 (37.4 percent). Two other candidates held the remaining 9.2 percent of the ballots cast. During the primary, Toth and the two other challengers (Craig McMichael and Andre Dean) had an informal détente among themselves. As all three were politically to the right of Representative Brady, and believing none of them would win an outright majority of votes cast, their immediate goal was to force a runoff. They hoped that then the top vote-getter among themselves would face off and defeat Brady for the nomination, but Brady did get over 50% of the vote, avoiding a runoff.

Toth spent $89,325 on the primary. Brady spent over $1.5 million on the primary. Toth criticized Brady for compromising too often with President Obama, supporting the omnibus federal budget bill, and voting to revive the U.S. Export-Import Bank. Toth had support from Tea Party groups. Brady received significant support from the business wing of the Republican Party. FEC filings show that, leading up to the primary and general elections, he received campaign contributions from the following industries: Oil and gas $401K, healthcare $367K, insurance $302K, securities and investments $269K, and pharmaceuticals $261K.

==== 2018 ====
On May 31, 2017, Toth announced that he would be running for his old Texas House seat, District 15, since the incumbent, Mark Keough, announced he would not be running for re-election but instead run for Montgomery County Judge. Toth's opponent in the Republican primary was Mary "Jackie" Waters of The Woodlands. Toth stated that he wanted to reduce property taxes for homeowners by implementing an acquisition-based appraisal system. A taxpayer's home value would be set upon the purchase price, regardless of how long the taxpayer lives in the house. Toth wants to encourage the San Jacinto River Authority ("SJRA") to work on the flood control aspects of its mission statement, instead of keeping Lake Conroe at full capacity for recreational purposes. He has also advocated for the directors of the SJRA board to be elected positions and for the directors to have a civil engineering background, to encourage effective floodplain models.

On March 6, 2018, Toth won the Republican nomination for Texas House District 15 over Waters by 78% to 21%. Toth received the largest vote margin of any candidate in Montgomery County, defeating Waters by 58% of the vote, a three-to-one margin.

In the November 2018 general election, Toth faced Democrat Lorena Perez McGill of The Woodlands. Toth indicated that in the general election against McGill, he would be focusing on lowering property taxes, passing tax reform, and raising teacher salaries. On Election Day, Toth defeated McGill 67% to 33%, a two-to-one margin.

==== 2020 ====
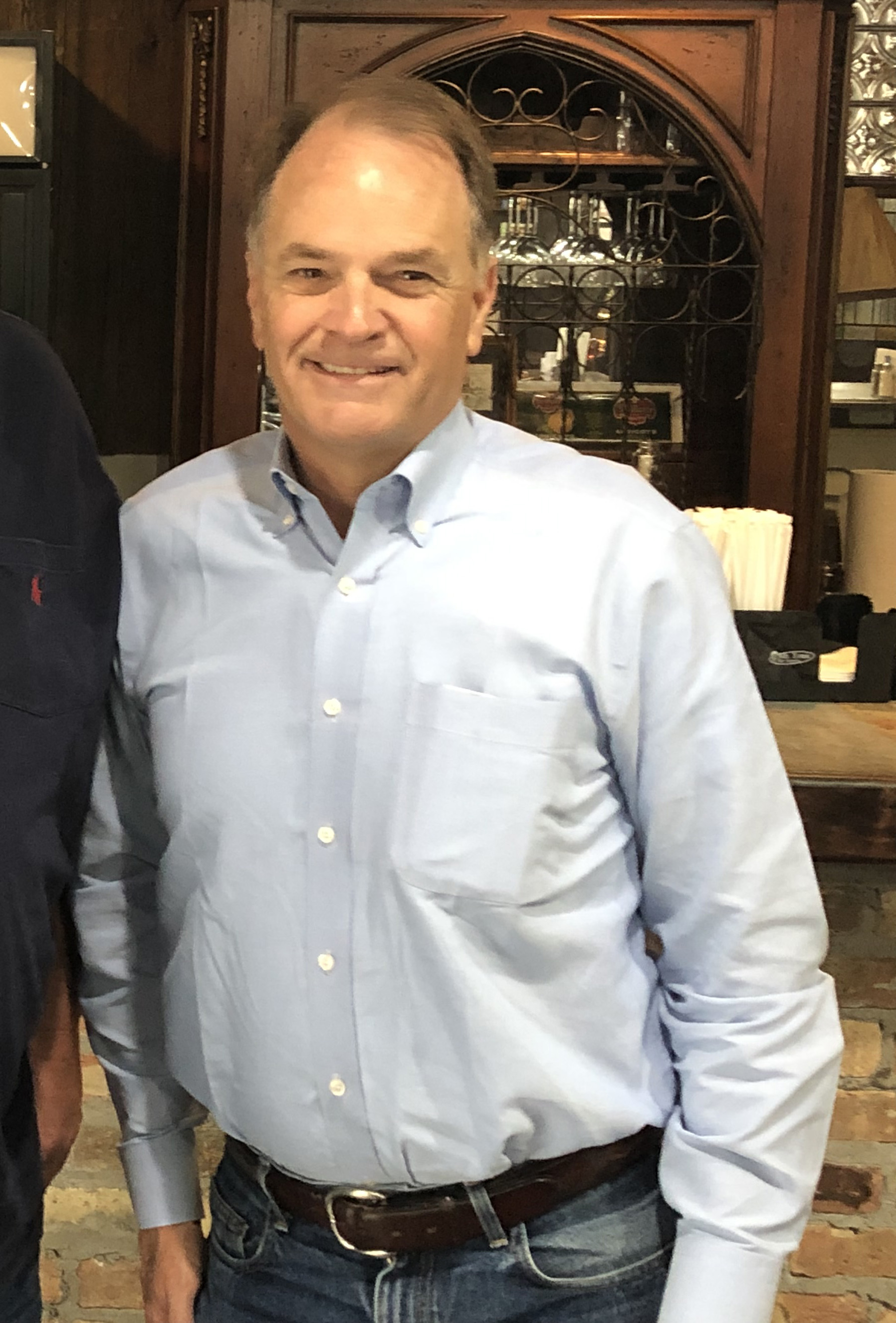
Steve Toth in The Woodlands, Texas in June 2019.

Toth was unopposed in the March 3, 2020 Republican primary. He faced Democrat Lorena Perez McGill again in the 2020 general election in November.

During the election, he was part of a group of Texas Republicans who filed lawsuits in both state and federal courts seeking to invalidate about 127,000 drive-thru cast votes in Harris County, Texas. Toth said that the county exceeded their state constitutional authority by allowing drive-thru voting as an alternative to walk-in voting during the COVID-19 pandemic, a change that Toth argued that should have only been decided by the Texas Legislature. Democrats said that this would disenfranchise everybody who cast drive-thru votes in good faith. The Texas Supreme Court dismissed the motion without issuing an order or opinion. Upon this defeat, Toth then took the case to federal court, initially losing at the lower court level. Federal Judge Andrew Hanen ruled that the plaintiffs did not have standing to sue. After the appeal, nine of the ten drive-thru voting sites were shut down by interim Harris County Clerk Chris Hollins, the outcome that Toth originally intended.

On November 3, 2020, Toth again defeated McGill 66.5% to 33.5%, a two-to-one margin. McGill raised $44,828, but she spent $58,422.

==== 2022 ====
Toth faced an opponent in the March 1, 2022, Republican primary. His opponent was attorney Maris Blair of The Woodlands, whose law firm primarily collects taxes. Blair has never held office, and her late father's law firm is the largest tax collection firm in Texas. Toth won the Republican primary with 69% of the vote to Blair's 31%, a two-to-one margin of victory. Toth faced schoolteacher Democrat Kristin Johnson of The Woodlands in the general election. On November 8, 2022, Toth defeated Johnson 66% to 34%, once again a two-to-one margin.

==== 2024 ====
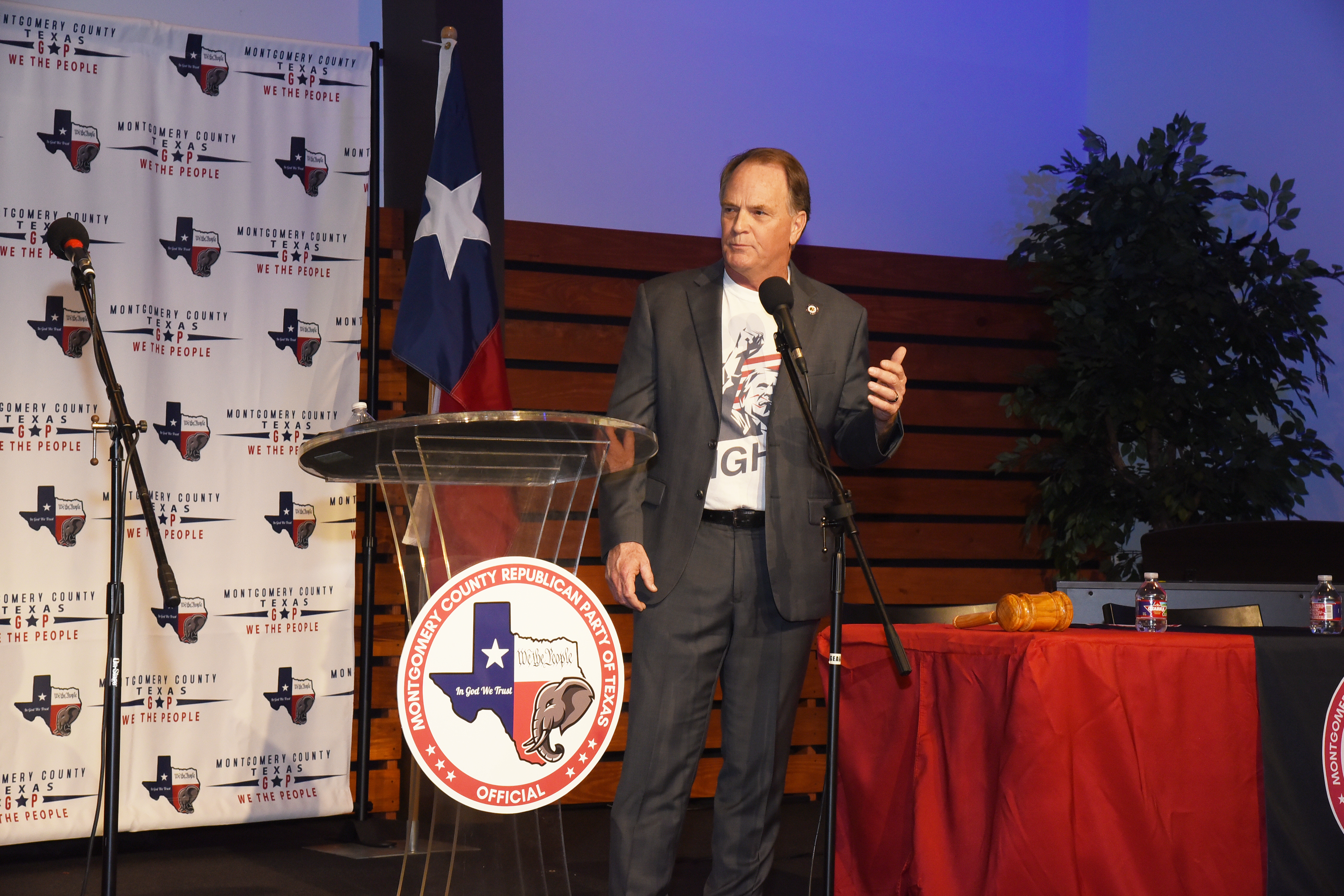
Steve Toth at a political function in The Woodlands, Texas on January 7, 2025.

Toth faced an opponent in the March 2024 Republican primary named Stephen "Skeeter" Hubert of Conroe, Texas. Hubert was a Conroe ISD school board member, whose appointed term on the board ended in November 2024.

Toth campaigned on ending Democratic committee chairs in the Texas House, promoting school choice, and limiting the House Speaker to two terms to curb their influence over individual members.

In the Republican primary on March 5, 2024, Toth defeated Hubert 66% to 34%, winning again by a two-to-one margin. After the victory, Toth said "Priorities include passing a Secure Classroom Act and the Classroom Teachers' Bill of Rights, which will be a companion bill to state Sen. Brandon Creighton's Senate bill." On November 5, 2024, Toth won re-election to the Texas House since no Democrat filed to run against him.

== U.S. House of Representatives ==
=== Elections ===
==== 2026 ====
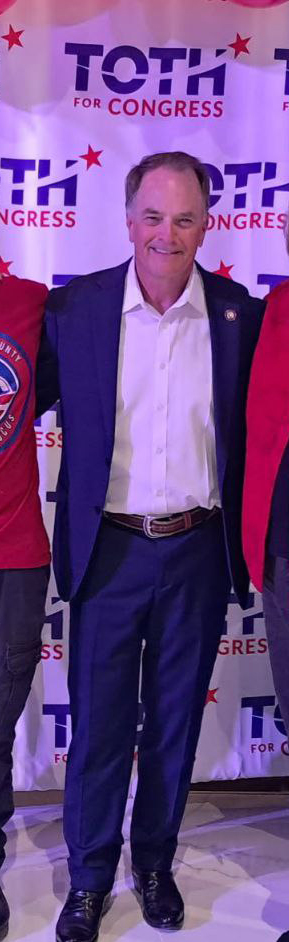
Steve Toth celebrating his Republican primary victory on March 3, 2026, at the Houston Event Center in Conroe, Texas.

On July 15, 2025, Toth officially announced his intention to challenge Dan Crenshaw for the Texas's 2nd congressional district seat at a rally in Spring, Texas. Toth criticized Crenshaw's record, arguing he's been lenient on immigration, focused on foreign aid, more responsive to lobbyists than constituents, and insufficient loyalty to MAGA priorities. Toth benefited from Crenshaw being the only Texas House Republican running without a Trump endorsement, and redistricting added more of Toth's Montgomery County base to the district. On March 3, 2026, Toth defeated Crenshaw 56%-41%. Toth won the primary despite Crenshaw having raised $1.3 million more.

Toth defeated Democrat Shaun Finnie in the general election on November 3, 2026, by a 51% to 49% margin. He received endorsements from President Trump, Turning Point Action, and the Freedom Caucus Fund and Ted Cruz, Texas' junior U.S. Senator. Toth has indicated that once sworn in, he plans to join the House Freedom Caucus. President Donald Trump endorsed him for the general election. As of June 30, 2026, Toth reported $834,450 in receipts and $152,935 in cash on hand to the FEC.

== Personal life ==
Steve Toth at the Toth for Congress Victory Party, in The Woodlands, Texas on November 3, 2026.

Toth and his wife, Babette Jayne Toth (born 1957), have three children and four grandchildren. They have resided in Montgomery County since 1997. Toth is a Christian and is ordained.

== Election results ==
2026 general election for Texas 2nd Congressional district

General election results, November 3, 2026
Party	Candidate	Votes	%
Republican	Steve Toth	144,748	50.98
Democratic	Shaun Finnie	139,167	49.02
Total votes		283,915	100

2026 Republican primary for Texas 2nd Congressional district

Republican primary election results, March 3, 2026
Party	Candidate	Votes	%
Republican	Steve Toth	36,760	55.8
Republican	Dan Crenshaw (incumbent)	26,764	40.7
Republican	Martin Etwop	1,211	1.8
Republican	Nicholas Lee Plumb	1,104	1.7
Total votes		65,839	100

2024 Republican primary for Texas 15th district state representative

Republican primary election results, March 5, 2024
Party	Candidate	Votes	%
Republican	Steve Toth (incumbent)	15,960	65.6
Republican	Stephen “Skeeter” Hubert	8,372	34.4
Total votes		24,332	100

2022 general election for Texas 15th district state representative

General election results, November 8, 2022
Party	Candidate	Votes	%
Republican	Steve Toth	46,948	65.68
Democratic	Kristin Johnson	24,529	34.32
Total votes		71,477	100

2022 Republican primary for Texas 15th district state representative

Republican primary election results, March 1, 2022
Party	Candidate	Votes	%
Republican	Steve Toth	13,984	69.22
Republican	Maris Blair	6,218	30.78
Total votes		20,202	100

2020 general election for Texas 15th district state representative

General election results, November 3, 2020
Party	Candidate	Votes	%
Republican	Steve Toth	71,586	66.47
Democratic	Lorena Perez McGill	36,111	33.53
Total votes		107,697	100

2018 general election for Texas 15th district state representative

General election results, November 6, 2018
Party	Candidate	Votes	%
Republican	Steve Toth	52,895	67.17
Democratic	Lorena Perez McGill	25,843	32.82
Total votes		78,738	100

2018 Republican primary for Texas 15th district state representative

Republican primary election results, March 6, 2018
Party	Candidate	Votes	%
Republican	Steve Toth	13,097	78.38
Republican	Mary "Jackie" Waters	3,612	21.62
Total votes		16,709	100

2016 Republican primary for Texas 8th Congressional district

Republican primary election results, March 1, 2016
Party	Candidate	Votes	%
Republican	Kevin Brady (incumbent)	64,745	53.39
Republican	Steve Toth	45,298	37.36
Republican	Craig McMichael	6,021	4.97
Republican	Andre Dean	5,196	4.29
Total votes		121,260	100

2014 special election runoff for Texas 4th district state senator

Republican special election runoff results, August 5, 2014
Party	Candidate	Votes	%
Republican	Brandon Creighton	15,232	67.38
Republican	Steve Toth	7,373	32.62
Total votes		22,605	100

2014 special election for Texas 4th district state senator

Republican special election results, May 10, 2014
Party	Candidate	Votes	%
Republican	Brandon Creighton	13,705	45.18
Republican	Steve Toth	7,193	23.71
Republican	Gordy Bunch	6,612	21.80
Republican	Michael Galloway	2,818	9.29
Total votes		30,328	100

2012 general election for Texas 15th district state representative

General election results, November 8, 2012
Party	Candidate	Votes	%
Republican	Steve Toth	57,520	86.64
Libertarian	Sterling Russell	8,872	13.36
Total votes		66,392	100

2012 Republican primary for Texas 15th district state representative

Republican primary election results, May 29, 2012
Party	Candidate	Votes	%
Republican	Steve Toth	9,630	56.48
Republican	Rob Eissler (incumbent)	7,420	43.52
Total votes		17,050	100

U.S. House of Representatives
Preceded by Dan Crenshaw	Member of the U.S. House of Representatives from Texas's 2nd congressional district Taking office 2027	Elect
