= Will Metcalf =

Texas state legislator

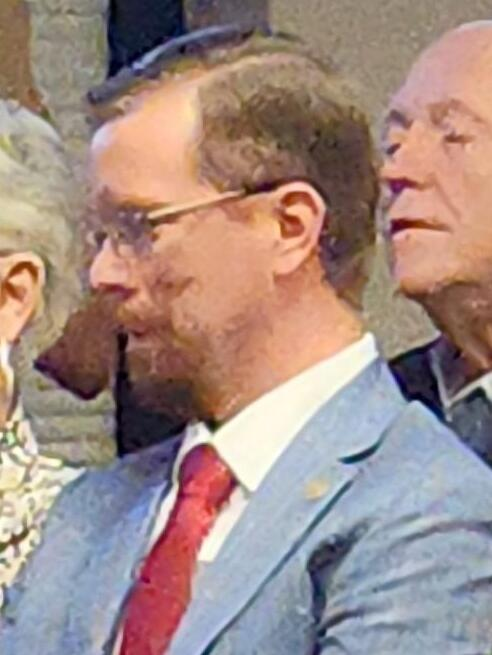
- Metcalf in 2025

Member of the Texas House of Representatives from the 16th district
- Incumbent
- Assumed office November 19, 2014
- Preceded by: Brandon Creighton

Personal details
- Born: June 6, 1984 (age 42) Conroe, Texas, U.S.
- Party: Republican
- Spouse: Megan
- Education: Sam Houston State University
- Occupation: Investment banker
- Website: Campaign website

Will Metcalf (born June 6, 1984) is an American banker and politician who has represented the 16th district in the Texas House of Representatives since 2014. As of 2021–2022, he is Chairman of the House Administration Committee, which oversees all operations of the House, including its rules, policies, and procedures, as well as its members, officers, and employees. He also serves on the committees for International Relations & Economic Development and House State Affairs.

Metcalf's first term as a member of the House began in 2015, following a special election held on November 4, 2014, to fill the vacancy left by Brandon Creighton's election to the Texas Senate. As of 2022, he has served two terms in the House and ran for a third term unchallenged in the November 4, 2022 midterm election.

== Early life ==
Will Metcalf is a longtime resident of Montgomery County, Texas, and refers to himself as a "sixth-generation resident of Montgomery county." His early schooling was in the Conroe Independent School District. He graduated from Conroe High School, and attended college at Sam Houston State University where he earned a Bachelor of Science degree in criminal justice. He and his wife, Megan, grew up together. They met at First Baptist Conroe, and in 2007, within months after he earned his degree, they were married.

== Legislative history ==
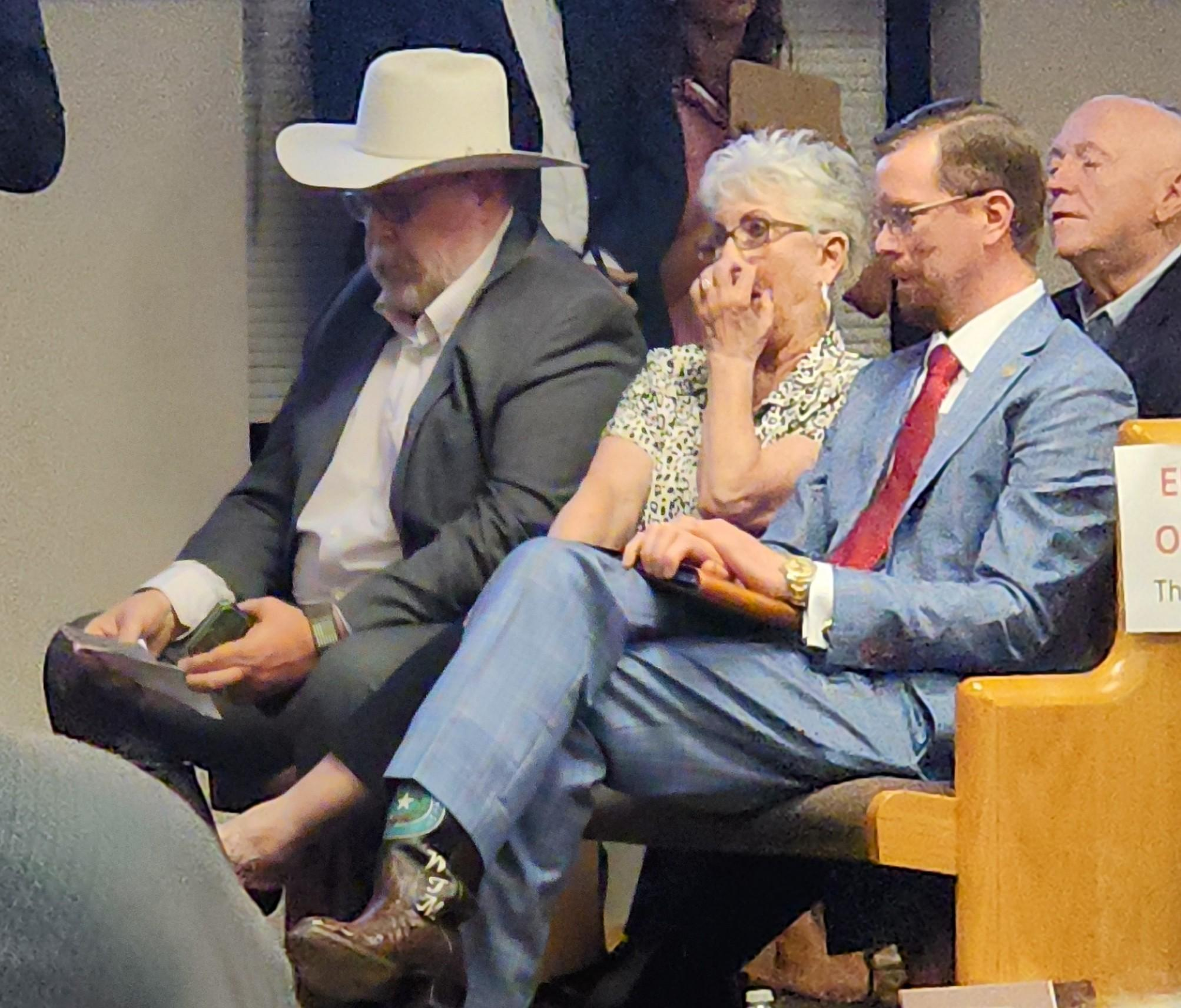
Will Metcalf and Cecil Bell being censured by the Montgomery County Republican Party in Conroe, Texas on March 4, 2025.

Metcalf became the Republican candidate for the seat vacated by Brandon Creighton, who won a seat in the Texas Senate. Metcalf defeated opponent Ted Seago in the 2014 Republican primary runoffs, and went on to defeat candidate Michael Hayles Sr. (D) and Bob Townsend (L) in the November 4, 2014 Special Election. In November 2018, he retained his seat as the incumbent by defeating Mike Midler (D) with 80.3% of the votes in the general election. In the 2020 election, he was unchallenged and easily retained his seat. He has served two terms in the House and is running for a third term unchallenged in the November 4, 2022, midterm election.

On May 27, 2023, Metcalf voted yes to impeach Ken Paxton. In a rematch with Mike Midler in 2024, he won re-election with 80.3% of the vote.

On March 4, 2025, the Montgomery County Republican Party censured Metcalf for supporting Dustin Burrows as Speaker of the Texas House of Representatives and voting for HR4, breaching the Texas GOP’s “No Democrat Chairs” priority.

== Positions, memberships, involvement ==
Metcalf has either served as a member of or been involved in the following:

- House Administration Committee, Chairman
- State Affairs Committee, Chairman
- International Relations & Economic Development Committee, member
- Energy Council, member
- Young Texans Legislative Caucus, member
- Rural Caucus, member
- House Republican Caucus, member
- Conroe YMCA, former Board member and Finance Committee member
- Homeland Security & Public Safety Committee, former member
- Natural Resources Committee, former vice-chairman
- Conroe Industrial Development Corporation Board, former chair of Finance & board member
- Redistricting Committee, former member
- Subcommittee on Small Business, former member
- Greater Conroe Economic Development, former Board member and Executive Committee member
- Montgomery County Fair Association Advisory Board, Past vice-chairman
- Livestock Auction Committee (2012–2013), former vice-chairman, and as of 2022 Committee Board member, and member of the Advisory Board.
- Class of 2014, Leadership Montgomery County, member
- Conroe Noon Lions Club, member
- Fellowship of Montgomery, member
- First Baptist Church Conroe Finance Committee, 3-year term
- First Baptist Academy, 2-year term Board of Trustees chairman
- Montgomery Independent School District Education Foundation, Board member and Treasurer
- Lifetime Member of the Montgomery County Fair Association, Friends of Conroe, NRA, 100 Club, and the Sam Houston State University Alumni Association

Texas House of Representatives
Preceded by Brandon Creighton	Member of the Texas House of Representatives from the 16th district 2014–present	Incumbent
