= Brett Ligon =

American politician

Member of the Texas Senate from the 4th district
- Incumbent
- Assumed office May 19, 2026
- Preceded by: Brandon Creighton

Personal details
- Party: Republican
- Education: Texas A&M University; South Texas College of Law Houston
- Website: Office website Campaign website

Brett Ligon is an American politician who is a member of the Texas Senate, representing the 4th District. He succeeded Brandon Creighton after his predecessor was appointed as Chancellor of the Texas Tech University System in November 2025.

On May 2, 2026, Ligon won the special election for the Senate District 4 seat against Democrat Ron Angeletti, 75% to 25%. He assumed office on May 19, 2026.

Prior to his election to the Texas Senate, Ligon was the elected District Attorney for Montgomery County, Texas. He held this position for seventeen years. Before public office, Brett Ligon held several positions in criminal justice, including service as the Assistant District Attorney in Harris County and as counsel for the Houston Police Officers Union.
