= Texas's 15th House of Representatives district =

American legislative district

Texas's 15th State House of Representatives district
Representative
Steve Toth; R–Conroe
- Demographics: 60.5% White; 9.0% Black; 20.2% Hispanic; 8.1% Asian; 2.2% Other
- Population (2020) • Voting age: 200,185; 147,396

District 15 is a district in the Texas House of Representatives. It was created in the 3rd legislature (1849–1851).

The district has been represented by Republican Steve Toth since January 8, 2019, upon his re-election to the Texas House; Toth previously served one term in the 83rd Legislature as the Representative from this district.

As a result of redistricting after the 2020 Federal census, from the 2022 elections the district encompasses central and portions of southeastern Montgomery County. Major cities in the district include all of Shenandoah and Oak Ridge North, and portions of Conroe.
