= Museum of the Gulf Coast =

- Location: 700 Procter Street, Port Arthur, Texas
- Coordinates: 29.8732°N 93.9329°W
- Website: museumofthegulfcoast.org

The Museum of the Gulf Coast, located in Port Arthur, Texas, specializes in Texas and Louisiana Gulf Coast history. A 39,000 sq. ft. facility with its most notable exhibits are a gallery of Robert Rauschenberg's artworks and a Music Hall of Fame honoring performers from the region; featured in the latter are artifacts of Janis Joplin's youth. The Music, Sports, and Notable Halls of Fame house more than 200 people from the Gulf Coast Region who have made national and or Internacional achievements in their respective fields. The museum is sponsored and administered by the Port Arthur Historical Society, and is the descendant of the original Port Arthur Museum chartered by the state in 1964. The administration of the museum is done in partnership with the City of Port Arthur.
