= Central Gardens, Texas =

- Census-designated place
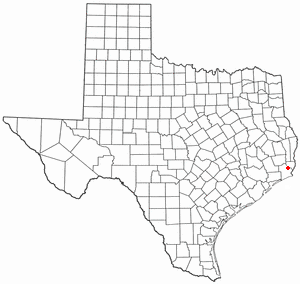
- Location of Central Gardens, Texas

- Coordinates: 29°59′47″N 94°01′28″W
- Country: United States
- State: Texas
- County: Jefferson

Area
  - Total: 2.59 sq mi (6.72 km^{2})
  - Land: 2.50 sq mi (6.48 km^{2})
  - Water: 0.093 sq mi (0.24 km^{2})
- Elevation: 13 ft (4.0 m)

Population (2020)
  - Total: 4,373
  - Density: 1,737/sq mi (670.5/km^{2})
- Time zone: UTC-6 (Central (CST))
  - Summer (DST): UTC-5 (CDT)
- FIPS code: 48-13972
- GNIS feature ID: 2408004

Central Gardens is an unincorporated community and census-designated place (CDP) in Jefferson County, Texas, United States. The population was 4,373 at the 2020 census. It is part of the Beaumont–Port Arthur metropolitan area.

== Geography ==
Central Gardens is located in eastern Jefferson County and is bordered to the southeast by Nederland. Texas State Highway 347 passes through the northeastern side of the community, leading southeast into Nederland and northwest 8 miles (13 km) to Beaumont.

According to the United States Census Bureau, the CDP has a total area of 2.6 square miles (6.7 km^{2}), of which 2.5 square miles (6.5 km^{2}) are land and 0.1 square miles (0.2 km^{2}), or 3.57%, are water.

=== Climate ===
The climate in this area is characterized by hot, humid summers and generally mild to cool winters. According to the Köppen Climate Classification system, Central Gardens has a humid subtropical climate, abbreviated "Cfa" on climate maps.

== Demographics ==
Historical population
Census	Pop.	Note	%±
1990	4,026		—
2000	4,106		2.0%
2010	4,347		5.9%
2020	4,373		0.6%
U.S. Decennial Census; 1850–1900 1910; 1920 1930 1940; 1950 1960 1970; 1980 1990 2000; 2010

Central Gardens first appeared as a census designated place in the 1990 U.S. census.

=== Racial and ethnic composition ===
Central Gardens CDP, Texas – Racial and ethnic composition Note: the US Census treats Hispanic/Latino as an ethnic category. This table excludes Latinos from the racial categories and assigns them to a separate category. Hispanics/Latinos may be of any race.
Race / Ethnicity (NH = Non-Hispanic)	Pop 2000	Pop 2010	Pop 2020	% 2000	% 2010	% 2020
White alone (NH)	3,843	3,772	3,297	93.59%	86.77%	75.39%
Black or African American alone (NH)	23	35	151	0.56%	0.81%	3.45%
Native American or Alaska Native alone (NH)	10	16	11	0.24%	0.37%	0.25%
Asian alone (NH)	20	74	128	0.49%	1.70%	2.93%
Native Hawaiian or Pacific Islander alone (NH)	1	1	3	0.02%	0.02%	0.07%
Other race alone (NH)	0	4	7	0.00%	0.09%	0.16%
Mixed race or Multiracial (NH)	32	57	110	0.78%	1.31%	2.52%
Hispanic or Latino (any race)	177	388	666	4.31%	8.93%	15.23%
Total	4,106	4,347	4,373	100.00%	100.00%	100.00%

=== 2020 census ===
As of the 2020 census, Central Gardens had a population of 4,373. The median age was 41.4 years. 21.5% of residents were under the age of 18 and 17.2% were 65 years of age or older. For every 100 females, there were 100.8 males, and for every 100 females age 18 and over, there were 99.5 males age 18 and over.

100.0% of residents lived in urban areas, while 0.0% lived in rural areas.

There were 1,751 households in Central Gardens, including 1,066 families. Of all households, 29.9% had children under the age of 18 living in them, 51.6% were married-couple households, 19.6% were households with a male householder and no spouse or partner present, and 24.0% were households with a female householder and no spouse or partner present. About 26.7% of all households were made up of individuals, and 11.6% had someone living alone who was 65 years of age or older.

There were 1,971 housing units, of which 11.2% were vacant. The homeowner vacancy rate was 1.6% and the rental vacancy rate was 14.8%.

=== 2000 census ===
As of the census of 2000, there were 4,106 people, 1,563 households, and 1,170 families residing in the CDP. The population density was 1,610.9 inhabitants per square mile (622.0/km^{2}). There were 1,701 housing units at an average density of 667.3 per square mile (257.6/km^{2}). The racial makeup of the CDP was 96.08% White, 0.56% African American, 0.29% Native American, 0.49% Asian, 0.02% Pacific Islander, 1.24% from other races, and 1.32% from two or more races. Hispanic or Latino of any race were 4.31% of the population.

There were 1,563 households, out of which 36.3% had children under the age of 18 living with them, 62.3% were married couples living together, 9.5% had a female householder with no husband present, and 25.1% were non-families. 21.3% of all households were made up of individuals, and 9.3% had someone living alone who was 65 years of age or older. The average household size was 2.61 and the average family size was 3.04.

In the CDP, the population was spread out, with 25.7% under the age of 18, 8.4% from 18 to 24, 29.1% from 25 to 44, 25.1% from 45 to 64, and 11.8% who were 65 years of age or older. The median age was 38 years. For every 100 females, there were 101.1 males. For every 100 females age 18 and over, there were 97.5 males.

The median income for a household in the CDP was $49,773, and the median income for a family was $60,096. Males had a median income of $39,500 versus $29,375 for females. The per capita income for the CDP was $24,513. About 3.9% of families and 6.1% of the population were below the poverty line, including 4.8% of those under age 18 and 6.1% of those age 65 or over.

== Education ==
The majority of Central Gardens CDP is within the Nederland Independent School District, while the land extends into Beaumont Independent School District.

Nederland High School is the comprehensive high school of the Nederland district.

Beaumont ISD area are zoned to Pietzsch/MacArthur K-8 School and Beaumont United High School.

The Texas Legislature does not specify a community college area for most of Jefferson County. As a result, no community college is specified for Central Gardens.
