= TPCS =

TPCS may refer to:

- Tire Pressure Control System
- The Pop Culture Suicides, a band
- Transcranial pulsed current stimulation (tPCS), a form of non-invasive brain electrical stimulation
- Tóth-Plósz Család

== See also ==
- TPC (disambiguation)
