= Nederland, Texas =

- City
- Flag
- Motto: "Programmed for progress"
- Location of Nederland, Texas

- Location within Texas Location within the United States Location within North America
- Coordinates: 29°58′08″N 94°00′03″W
- Country: United States
- State: Texas
- County: Jefferson
- Settled: 1897
- Incorporated: 1940
- Named for: Netherlands

Government
  - Type: Council-Manager

Area
  - Total: 6.05 sq mi (15.67 km^{2})
  - Land: 5.92 sq mi (15.34 km^{2})
  - Water: 0.13 sq mi (0.33 km^{2})
- Elevation: 13 ft (4.0 m)

Population (2020)
  - Total: 18,856
  - Density: 2,932/sq mi (1,132.2/km^{2})
- Time zone: UTC-6 (Central (CST))
  - Summer (DST): UTC-5 (CDT)
- ZIP code: 77627
- Area code: 409
- FIPS code: 48-50580
- GNIS feature ID: 2411219
- U.S. Routes: FM 365
- Website: www.ci.nederland.tx.us

Nederland (/ˈniːdərlənd/ NEE-dər-lənd) is a city in Jefferson County, Texas, United States. The population was 18,856 at the 2020 census.

The city was settled in 1897 along what became Boston Avenue and was incorporated in 1940. It was settled by Dutch immigrants on land sold by the Kansas City Southern Railway. It is part of the Beaumont–Port Arthur metropolitan area. Nederland is also a part of an area known as "the Golden Triangle", which comprises Beaumont, Port Arthur, and Orange. The city is adjacent to the Jack Brooks Regional Airport.

== History ==
Nederland was founded in 1897 by Dutch settlers as a repayment for financial services of Dutch bankers who financed the Kansas City Southern railroad line that runs through the center of the city. (Nederland, which literally translates to "Lowland", is the Dutch name for the Netherlands.) The more prominent families were named Rienstra, Doornbos, and Van Oostrom, and their descendants still live in the area today. Tradition says they were attracted to the flat coastal terrain that reminded them of their homeland (although the heat most certainly did not).

Nederland's early economy was driven by rice and dairy farming. However, the depression of 1907 and overproduction caused the rice industry in the town to collapse. Many Dutch settlers moved away from the area during this time, but a small percentage remained. After the Spindletop gusher discovery of 1901 and the establishment of the Sun Oil (Now Entergy Transfer) terminal near Nederland, the town became a residential community for the workers of the nearby oil terminals.

Nederland became incorporated as a city in 1940. The surrounding larger cities of Beaumont, Port Arthur, and Orange came to be known as the Golden Triangle. In the 1940s and 1950s, the Port of Port Arthur and the Port of Beaumont were as important as New Orleans, Houston, or Galveston, and Nederland thrived as a result.

The refineries also attracted a large population of blue-collar laborers into the area. The area drew particularly heavily from southern Louisiana, and a strong Cajun flair is evident throughout the community. With the decline of oil prices in the 1980s, the local economy suffered and Nederland experienced slight population losses, but has stabilized in the late 1990s and 2000s.

Nederland is the ending location of the Keystone Pipeline.

== Geography ==
Nederland is located in eastern Jefferson County and is bordered to the east by Port Neches, to the south by Port Arthur, and to the north by unincorporated Central Gardens. Texas State Highway 347 runs through the northeastern side of the city, close to downtown, and the U.S. Route 69/96/287 freeway runs through the southwestern side. Nederland is 10 miles (16 km) southeast of downtown Beaumont and 8 miles (13 km) northwest of the center of Port Arthur. It is approximately 90 miles (140 km) east of Houston.

According to the United States Census Bureau, Nederland has a total area of 5.8 square miles (15.1 km^{2}), of which 5.7 square miles (14.8 km^{2}) are land and 0.1 square miles (0.3 km^{2}), or 2.19%, are water.

=== Climate ===
Nederland is on a subtropical coastal plain. The proximity to the coast contributes to high humidity during the summer months. The region also has its share of tropical storms.

On September 23, 2005, Nederland was hit by Hurricane Rita, a category 3 hurricane causing $12 billion of damage in southeastern Texas and southwestern Louisiana.

On September 13, 2007, Nederland was hit by Hurricane Humberto, a category 1 hurricane. The eye of the hurricane passed over the city.

On September 13, 2008, Nederland was hit by hurricane-force winds of Hurricane Ike, a category 2 hurricane that came ashore at Galveston and pushed an 18-foot (5.5 m) storm surge ahead of it. The Golden Triangle area of Nederland, Port Arthur, Port Neches and Beaumont were spared from the surge by the sea wall that surrounds Port Arthur. Bridge City, Orange and the outlying areas were severely flooded.

From August 26 to 30, 2017, Hurricane Harvey set the record for the highest rainfall from a tropical cyclone in United States history, when 60.58 inches (1,539 mm) of precipitation fell in Nederland.

Climate data for Nederland, Texas
Month	Jan	Feb	Mar	Apr	May	Jun	Jul	Aug	Sep	Oct	Nov	Dec	Year
Record high °F (°C)	86 (30)	90 (32)	95 (35)	94 (34)	101 (38)	106 (41)	108 (42)	108 (42)	105 (41)	99 (37)	94 (34)	86 (30)	108 (42)
Mean daily maximum °F (°C)	62 (17)	65 (18)	72 (22)	78 (26)	85 (29)	90 (32)	92 (33)	92 (33)	88 (31)	81 (27)	72 (22)	64 (18)	78 (26)
Mean daily minimum °F (°C)	43 (6)	46 (8)	52 (11)	59 (15)	67 (19)	73 (23)	74 (23)	74 (23)	70 (21)	61 (16)	52 (11)	45 (7)	60 (15)
Record low °F (°C)	11 (−12)	10 (−12)	20 (−7)	32 (0)	45 (7)	53 (12)	61 (16)	58 (14)	45 (7)	30 (−1)	22 (−6)	12 (−11)	10 (−12)
Average precipitation inches (mm)	5.62 (143)	3.70 (94)	3.53 (90)	3.21 (82)	5.23 (133)	7.09 (180)	5.96 (151)	5.38 (137)	5.97 (152)	5.58 (142)	4.40 (112)	5.29 (134)	60.96 (1,550)
Source: The Weather Channel

== Demographics ==
Historical population
Census	Pop.	Note	%±
1950	3,805		—
1960	12,036		216.3%
1970	16,810		39.7%
1980	16,855		0.3%
1990	16,192		−3.9%
2000	17,422		7.6%
2010	17,547		0.7%
2020	18,856		7.5%
U.S. Decennial Census

=== 2020 census ===
As of the 2020 census, there were 18,856 people, 7,542 households, and 4,448 families residing in the city.

The median age was 37.8 years. 23.7% of residents were under the age of 18 and 16.0% of residents were 65 years of age or older. For every 100 females there were 97.7 males, and for every 100 females age 18 and over there were 95.6 males age 18 and over.

There were 7,542 households in Nederland, of which 32.6% had children under the age of 18 living in them. Of all households, 50.0% were married-couple households, 19.6% were households with a male householder and no spouse or partner present, and 25.5% were households with a female householder and no spouse or partner present. About 27.7% of all households were made up of individuals and 11.2% had someone living alone who was 65 years of age or older.

There were 8,135 housing units, of which 7.3% were vacant. The homeowner vacancy rate was 1.7% and the rental vacancy rate was 9.1%.

100.0% of residents lived in urban areas, while 0.0% lived in rural areas.

Racial composition as of the 2020 census
Race	Number	Percent
White	14,118	74.9%
Black or African American	843	4.5%
American Indian and Alaska Native	121	0.6%
Asian	823	4.4%
Native Hawaiian and Other Pacific Islander	10	0.1%
Some other race	1,241	6.6%
Two or more races	1,700	9.0%
Hispanic or Latino (of any race)	3,376	17.9%

=== 2010 census ===
As of the 2010 census, there were 17,547 people, 6,761 households, and 4,448 families residing in the city. The population density was 3,063.2 inhabitants per square mile (1,182.7/km^{2}). There were 7,226 housing units at an average density of 1,270.5 per square mile (490.5/km^{2}).

The racial makeup of the city was 69.7% White, 17.9% Hispanic or Latino, 4% African American, 0.37% Native American, 4.33% Asian, 0.4% Pacific Islander, 0.29% from other races, and 3.12% from two or more races.

There were 6,761 households, out of which 34.5% had children under the age of 18 living with them, 51.4% were married couples living together, 11.1% had a female householder with no husband present, and 34.2% were non-families. 26.2% of all households were made up of individuals, and 9.4% had someone living alone who was 65 years of age or older. The average household size was 2.56 and the average family size was 3.25.

In the city the population was spread out, with 27.3% under the age of 18, 8.5% from 18 to 24, 29.6% from 25 to 44, 26.1% from 45 to 64, and 14.3% who were 65 years of age or older. The median age was 36.5 years. For every 100 females, there were 88.2 males.

The median income for a household in the city was $53,231, and the median income for a family was $61,149. Males had a median income of $43,691 versus $25,457 for females. The per capita income for the city was $26,285. About 5.4% of families and 6.0% of the population were below the poverty line, including 7.9% of those under age 18 and 5.6% of those age 65 or over.

== Economy ==
According to the city of Nederland's 2022 Annual Financial Report the top employers in the city are:

Ranking	Employer	# of Employees	Percentage of total city employment
1	Nederland Independent School District	682	7.87%
2	Energy Transfer	213	2.46%
3	Mid-County Extended Care Hospital (Closed in 2023)	169	1.95%
4	Phillpott Motors	133	1.53%
5	Time Warner	130	1.50%
6	Five Point Credit Union	125	1.44%
7	City of Nederland	124	1.43%
8	DuPont	75	0.87%
9	Whataburger	72	0.83%
10	Unocal	66	0.76%
11	JK Chevrolet	65	0.75%
12	Hargrove Engineers	58	0.67%

== Government and infrastructure ==
=== City government ===
The City of Nederland completed a new $1.3 million City Hall building at 207 N. 12th street in September 2013. The previous City Hall was shared with police and fire services and received a $3.6 million upgrade for police and fire services only. The older building is now named the Homer E. Nagel Public Safety Complex. The safety complex was completed in August 2014.

Nederland has a council-manager system of government.

Current city officials are (as of 2025):

Position	Name
Mayor	Jeff Darby
Councilmember Ward I	Bret Duplant
Councilmember Ward II	Britton Jones
Councilmember Ward III	Randy Sonnier
Councilmember Ward IV Mayor Pro-Tem	Jeff Ortiz
City Manager	Manuel “Manny” Delarosa

=== State government ===
Dade Phelan [R]: State Representative for District 21.

Robert Nichols [R]: State Senator for District 3.

=== US government ===
Randy Weber [R] is the representative of the 14th congressional district of Texas for the 118th US Congress.

John Cornyn [R] is the senior United States senator representing Texas in the 118th United States Congress.

Ted Cruz [R] is the junior United States senator representing Texas in the 118th United States Congress.

The United States Postal Service Nederland Post Office is located at 223 North 14th Street.

== Culture ==
=== Arts and theater ===
Dutch Windmill Museum

The Nederland Performing Arts Theater, on the campus of Nederland High School, hosts performances for the high school, in addition to plays and concerts. It also houses the Nederland High School Band and the Nederland Drama Department. The center was built in 1999 from a bond that was passed by the voters.

La Maison Des Acadiens house

The Dutch Windmill Museum is an authentic replica of a Dutch windmill and was created to honor the settlers from the Netherlands that founded Nederland. It was built in 1969 and contains donated items from Nederland's history. The museum is in Tex Ritter Park on Boston Avenue.

The La Maison Des Acadiens house is a replica of houses used by early French settlers of the area. It is located next to the Dutch Windmill Museum.

=== Tourism and recreation ===
==== Boston Avenue ====
Boston Avenue is part of the original plot of Nederland when it was founded in 1897. It carries both its modern name and the original Dutch name on street signs (Heeren Straats). The Boston Avenue shopping district offers boutique shopping and events throughout the year. These events include the Nederland Heritage Festival, Christmas Parade, Homecoming Parade, and Third Thursday shopping events. Boston Avenue is also the location of the Nederland Windmill and Le Maison de Acadiens Museums and Tex Ritter Park.

==== Events ====
The Nederland Heritage Festival began on the 75th anniversary of the founding of the town in 1973 as part of the city's Diamond Jubilee and has become known area wide, attracting over 100,000 people over the week of festivities. It includes multiple events during the week with carnival rides, pageants, a parade, golf tournament and live music to name a few.

The carnival is usually held on the second or third week of March, during the Nederland Independent School District's spring break. The other events are held beginning in February and running through the end of the carnival itself.

The Nederland Parks department in conjunction with the Nederland Chamber of Commerce created a Fourth of July celebration that is held at Doornbos Park starting in 2012. The celebration includes fireworks, food and music along with entertainment for children. It is open to anyone in the area. The celebration is in its tenth year as of 2022.

Nederland's annual Christmas parade is usually held the second or third week of December, weather permitting. The parade is hosted by the Chamber of Commerce and allows businesses and organizations throughout the area to enter bands, floats or other vehicles. This parade is a lighted parade that goes through the historic Boston Avenue downtown area and Nederland Avenue.

==== Parks and recreation ====
The city of Nederland manages six parks located throughout the city.

- Nederland Veterans Park – This park commemorates all veterans and also contains a Wall of Honor for veterans from Nederland. The park is located next to the new City Hall on North 12th st.
- Doornbos Heritage Park – Located at 2301 Avenue H and named for the member of the Doornbos family who donated the land to the city. This park includes the Nederland City Swimming Pool, a duck pond, gazebos and several play areas for children. It is also the location of the Nederland Recreation Center which a contains an indoor gym, racquetball court and rental space for events.
- Tex Ritter Park – Located at 1500 Boston Avenue and named for country singer Tex Ritter, who was from Nederland. The park includes the Dutch Windmill and Les Maisons Acadiens Museum and a gazebo and eating area.
- Homer Nagel Park – Located at 3210 Avenue G and named for the city's mayor for 38 years and died in 2011. This park has a fenced play area and climbing apparatus for children.
- Carl "Cropo" Leblanc Park - Located at 923 Boston Avenue and named for the city mayor and barber for 50 years, who died in 2001. This park has swings, slides and climbing apparatus for small children.
- South 5th St. Park – Located at 599 S. 5th Street. This park contains a climbing apparatus and swings for children.
- Rienstra Heritage Park – Located at 820 Helena Avenue. Named after another prominent family in Nederland, this park has walking paths and a covered picnic area.

=== Historical buildings ===
The Orange Hotel was built in November 1897 on Boston Avenue near the current location of Bank of America. It was the primary housing location for visitors and oil and railroad workers. It was eventually abandoned and torn down around 1912.

The Nederland Pharmacy was opened in 1902 at the corner of Boston Avenue and Highway 347 and closed in 2002. A tanning salon now occupies the pharmacy building.

Langham Elementary School was originally built where the current elementary playground currently stands. The current Langham Elementary School building was built in 1940.

Setzer's Hardware was built in 1898 as a rice storage facility at the corner of Boston Avenue and 11th Street, and still stands today.

== Education ==
=== Primary and secondary schools ===
The city is served by the Nederland Independent School District. The schools in Nederland include four elementary schools, two middle schools, and one high school serving approximately 5372 students as of 2022. Overall, the school district is rated as an "A" which is the highest rating that can be attained, by the Texas Education Agency's system for 2022.

- Langham Elementary School – Is an early education through fourth grade campus located at 800 S. 12th St. The campus is rated as an overall "A" by Texas Education Agency for 2022.
- Helena Park Elementary School – An early education through fourth grade campus located at 2800 Helena Ave. The campus is rated as an overall "B" by the Texas Education Agency for 2022.
- Highland Park Elementary School – An Early Education through fourth grade campus located at 200 S. 6th St. The campus is rated as an overall "A" by the Texas Education Agency for 2022.
- Hillcrest Elementary School – An Early Education through fourth grade campus located at 2611 Ave. H. The campus is rated as an overall "A" by the Texas Education Agency for 2022.

The two middle schools are:

- C. O. Wilson Middle School Bullpups – A fifth through eighth grade campus located at 2620 Helena Ave. The campus is rated as an overall "B" by the Texas Education Agency for 2022.
- Central Middle School Canines – A fifth through eighth grade campus located at 200 N. 17th St. The campus is rated as an overall "B" by the Texas Education Agency for 2022.

The one high school is Nederland High School, a ninth through 12th grade campus located at 2101 18th St. The campus is rated an overall "B" by the Texas Education Agency for 2022.

==== School Bond ====
On May 6, 2019, voters passed a $155 million school bond that contained two propositions. Proposition A contained money to build a brand new high school that will be located behind the current one, upgrades to both CO Wilson and Central Middle school and adding new classrooms for all 4 elementary schools. Proposition B approves upgrades to Bulldog stadium including new turf, bathrooms and press box.

=== City library ===
Nederland is served by the Marion and Ed Hughes Public Library. The library is currently located at 2712 Nederland Avenue. It was formerly located at 1903 Atlanta Avenue and was named the D. Bob Henson Memorial Library after the city manager who was killed in an accident. The library started out in the Orange Hotel on Boston Avenue and has moved locations several times as the city grew.

=== Colleges and universities ===
Lamar University, established in 1923, is an accredited member of the Texas State University System in the nearby city of Beaumont. Lamar Institute of Technology was established in 1990 and is located adjacent to Lamar University. Lamar State College–Port Arthur is located south of Nederland in the city of Port Arthur, Texas and offers two-year degrees and one-year certificates.

The Texas Legislature specifies community college districts for most places in Texas; as of 2026 it has not directly assigned most of Jefferson County, including Nederland, to a specific community college district.

=== Media ===
==== Television ====
Call sign	Channel/Digital channel	Location
KBTV	(Dabl) 4/ Digital 40	Beaumont, TX
KITU	(TBN) 34/ Digital 33	Orange, TX
KFDM	(CBS) 6/ Digital 6.1	Beaumont, TX
KWBB	(CW) 14/ Digital 6.2	Beaumont, Lake Charles
FOX4	(Fox) 5/ Digital 6.3	Beaumont, Port Arthur
KBMT	(ABC)12/ Digital 12.1	Beaumont, TX
KJAC	(NBC)50/ Digital 12.2	Beaumont, TX

==== Newspapers ====
Nederland is served by two newspapers:

- The Beaumont Enterprise, which was founded in 1880 and is owned by the Hearst Corporation, is a daily newspaper that serves the Golden Triangle and the surrounding area.
- The Port Arthur News delivers seven days a week and serves Nederland, Port Neches, and Port Arthur primarily. The newspaper is owned by CNHI and is the sister newspaper of the Orange Leader.

== Transportation ==
=== Road travel ===
Nederland is served by US 69/US 287/US 96, SH 347 and FM 365.

Approximately 11 miles (18 km) to the northwest is Interstate 10, which serves as a main east-west corridor from Florida to California.

US 69/287/96 runs along the west side of Nederland, from Port Arthur to Beaumont and merges with Interstate 10.

Texas 347 runs along the east side of Nederland from Port Arthur to Beaumont and merges with US 69/287/96.

FM 365 runs along the south side of Nederland from Port Neches to Winnie and merges with Interstate 10.

=== Air travel ===
Nederland is served by the Jack Brooks Regional Airport, formally named the Southeast Texas Regional Airport, located on the west side of the city. The airport has daily flights to Dallas/Fort Worth International Airport, with connecting flights to destinations beyond.

== Notable people ==
- Davy Arnaud, professional soccer player
- Clay Buchholz, Major League Baseball pitcher with the Boston Red Sox
- Phyllis Davis, actress best known for her role as Beatrice Travis in the TV series, Vega$
- Walt Davis, 1952 Olympics gold medalist in the high jump
- Tim Foust, country music singer/songwriter, bass vocalist for the a cappella group Home Free
- Kendrick Perkins, professional basketball player for the Boston Celtics and Oklahoma City Thunder
- Bum Phillips (1923–2013), NFL head coach, father of NFL coach Wade Phillips
- Tex Ritter (1905–1974), country singer and actor; father of actor John Ritter
- Brian Sanches, Major League Baseball pitcher for the Philadelphia Phillies, Washington Nationals, and Florida Marlins
- Karen Silkwood, chemical worker and labor union activist
- John Varley, Hugo and Nebula award-winning science-fiction author
- Lance Watson, professional soccer player for Major League Soccer's Kansas City Wizards
