= Potential Tropical Cyclone Nine =

Potential Tropical Cyclone Nine generally refers to the ninth potential tropical cyclone in any given tropical storm season.

Potential Tropical Cyclone Nine may refer to:

- Potential Tropical Cyclone Nine (2017), later named Hurricane Harvey
- Potential Tropical Cyclone Nine (2019), later named Hurricane Humberto
- Potential Tropical Cyclone Nine (2020), later named Hurricane Isaias
- Potential Tropical Cyclone Nine (2023), later named Tropical Storm Harold
- Potential Tropical Cyclone Nine (2024), later named Hurricane Helene
- Potential Tropical Cyclone Nine (2025), later named Hurricane Imelda
