= List of storms named Hugo =

The name Hugo has been used for one tropical cyclone in the Atlantic Ocean and one European windstorm.

In the Atlantic:

- Hurricane Hugo (1989) – a Category 5 hurricane that affected the northeastern Caribbean and the Southeastern United States, becoming the costliest tropical cyclone at the time.

The name Hugo was retired after the 1989 season and was replaced with Humberto.

In Europe:

- Storm Hugo (2018) – an extratropical cyclone that affected Portugal.

== See also ==
- Hurricane Huko (2002) – a Central Pacific Ocean tropical cyclone with a similar name.
