= Montana (ship) =

Paddle steamer wrecked in 1863

History

United Kingdom
- Name: Montana (aka Nola, Gloria, and Paramount)
- Fate: Sank, 30 December 1863

General characteristics
- Type: Side-wheel paddle steamer
- Displacement: 750 long tons (762 t)
- Length: 236 ft (72 m)
- Beam: 25 ft (7.6 m)
- Propulsion: 2 × 260 nhp oscillating cylinder steam engines
- Speed: 15 knots (28 km/h; 17 mph)

Montana was a paddle steamer that was wrecked off the north coast of Bermuda on 30 December 1863.

== History ==
The vessel was intended for operation as a blockade runner, supplying Confederate Forces in the American Civil War. She was on her maiden voyage from London, headed ultimately for Wilmington, North Carolina, carrying cargo from the United Kingdom to help the Confederates. The UK could not be seen to be directly aiding the Confederates, hence various levels of secrecy were used for this and similar vessels. For example, at the time she was using an assumed name of Nola, a ruse to help avoid the attention of Union forces. She had used at least two other names at various times: Gloria and Paramount.

Captain Pittman was in command of the vessel, and saw her safely across a rough Atlantic Ocean as far as Bermuda, where he planned to stop to take on coal before departing for Wilmington. The ship hit the reef of Bermuda's north shore, in an area known as the Western Blue Cut, on 30 December 1863.

Once the vessel was known to be in distress, a boat from St Georges went to the scene. While much of the cargo and the entire crew were saved, Montana was lost, mostly due to a large gash in her side of over 10 feet (3.0 meters).

== Vessel statistics ==
The vessel was 236 feet (72 meters) long, with a 25-foot (7.6-meter) beam, and a displacement of 750 tons.

== Current status ==
The wreck is quite compact within the Bermudian reef system to the north west of the island, and it lies in relatively shallow water, at a maximum depth of about thirty feet. The wreck has various parts still intact, however it is easy to confuse with another wreck, that of the Constellation, which sank in the same location in 1942.

It is a popular dive spot for many of the local dive operators, as it lies within a 45-minute boat journey of Hamilton, and in such shallow waters it can be appreciated by both snorkelling, and scuba diving.

The wreck sustained extensive damage during Hurricane Humberto in September 2019.

== GPS co-ordinates ==
Montana is located at 32°21.817′N, 64°54.812′W.
