= Texas State Highway 347 =

State highway in Texas

State Highway 347
- SH 347, highlighted in red

Route information
- Maintained by TxDOT
- Length: 11.441 mi (18.413 km)
- Existed: 1942–present

Major junctions
- South end: SH 87 in Port Arthur
- North end: US 69 / US 96 / US 287 in Beaumont

Location
- Country: United States
- State: Texas

Highway system
- Highways in Texas; Interstate; US; State; Former; Toll; Loops; Spurs; FM/RM; Park; Rec
← SH 346	→ SH 348

State Highway 347 (SH 347) is a Texas state highway that runs northwest from Port Arthur to the southern edge of Beaumont. The highway is signed south–north. It was designated on November 25, 1942 along the old route of US 69.

== Route description ==
SH 347 begins at SH 87 in Port Arthur. The highway heads northwest, crossing SH 73, Spur 136 and FM 365. SH 347 then enters Nederland and has a junction with FM 366. Continuing northwest, the highway enters Beaumont and ends at US 69/US 96/US 287 in the southern end of the city at Spur 380 ( Martin Luther King Jr. Parkway)

== Junction list ==
The entire route is in Jefferson County.

Location	mi	km	Destinations	Notes
Port Arthur	0.0	0.0	SH 87 (Gulfway Drive)	
Port Arthur	1.7	2.7	SH 73 – Winnie, Groves	Interchange
Port Arthur	3.3	5.3	Spur 136 east	Interchange
Nederland	5.1	8.2	FM 365 – Fannett, Port Neches	Interchange
	7.0	11.3	FM 366 – Port Neches	Interchange; no southbound entrance
Beaumont	11.6	18.7	US 69 north / US 96 north / US 287 north	Interchange
1.000 mi = 1.609 km; 1.000 km = 0.621 mi: Incomplete access
