= Nederland Independent School District =

School district in Texas, United States

Nederland I.S.D.

Address
- 220 North 17th Street Nederland, Jefferson County, Texas; United States

District information
- Type: Public
- Grades: Pre-K through 12
- Established: 1920; 106 years ago
- Superintendent: Dr. Stuart Kieschnick
- Chair of the board: Micah Mosley
- Governing agency: Texas Education Agency
- Schools: 9
- NCES District ID: 4832280

Students and staff
- Students: 5,279 (2023–2024)
- Teachers: 365.21 (on an FTE basis) (2023–2024)
- Staff: 281.33 (on an FTE basis) (2023–2024)
- Student–teacher ratio: 14.45 (2023–2024)
- Athletic conference: UIL Class 5A Football & Basketball
- District mascot: Bulldogs
- Colors: Black and Gold

Other information
- Website: www.nederlandisd.org

Nederland Independent School District is a public school district based in Nederland, Texas (USA).

Originally organized in 1920, the Nederland Independent School District has served the community for 100 years. The first school was built on grounds donated by Mr. Bluitt Langham, which is located at the current playground of Langham Elementary. A new school was built in the 1930s at the location of the current Alternative campus to accommodate the influx of students. This building was to become the high school until the 1970s. In addition to Nederland, the district also serves most of Beauxart Gardens and Central Gardens and portions of Port Neches and Port Arthur.

In 2019, the school district was rated "A" by the Texas Education Agency.

== History ==
The precursors of the school district began as a series of single or two room schoolhouses formed to educate the children of the Dutch families that founded and moved into Nederland. The earliest known school room was started in 1898 as a one-room school houses that was built behind the old Orange hotel on Boston Avenue, with several children attending. As the city population grew, there were additional schools built at the corner of 10th st and Chicago and also at the Dutch Reformed Church. These early schools did not have full accreditation and were equivalent to a junior high education. A two-story school was built in 1912 on the land of Mr. Bluitt Langham, and the Nederland Independent School district was organized by Jefferson County in 1920.

== Dress code ==
In January 2008 the district adopted a new dress code rule effective fall 2008. Students in grades 5 through 12 are required to wear solid color shirts with no logo or Nederland bulldog shirts. Trousers may be blue, navy, black, denim, or khaki. Skirts or jumpers may be khaki, navy, black, or denim.

== Facilities ==
All of the schools are in the City of Nederland. The district consists of four elementary schools, two middle schools and one high school (Nederland High School) and one alternative campus. The District also maintains a separate Administration building with maintenance and bus facilities on that site, a Performing Arts Theater located on the High School campus and Bulldog Stadium, which is located on the campus of Central Middle School.

=== Nederland High School (grades 9–12) ===
The current high school was built in 1971 and is located at 2101 18th Street. The campus was rated as an overall "A" by the Texas Education Agency for 2019. The principal is Natalie Gomez.

==== Clubs and organizations – Nederland High School ====
- Academic Decathlon
- Athletics
- Band
- Bulldog Beat Newspaper
- Business Professionals of America
- Cheerleaders
- Choir
- Criminal Justice Club
- Computer Applications
- DECA
- FCCLA
- FFA
- First Priority
- French Club and French Honor Society
- Texas Association for Future Educators
- Goldenettes
- Golden Silks
- HOSA
- International Thespian Society
- Key Club
- Spanish Club
- Student Council
- TNT
- UIL Academics
- Westernaires
- Yearbook

==== Performing Arts Center ====
In 1999 a bond was approved by the voters to build a new performing arts center on the campus of Nederland High School. The 2,000-seat theater and classroom facilities house the Nederland High School band, Nederland Performance Arts and Nederland Choir classes and contain studios and practice rooms for the respective students. It is the location of many of the district-wide meetings and concerts and performances put on by students from all schools. The theater is also rented out for outside performances.

=== Central Middle School ===
- Central Middle School is located at 200 N. 17th street across from the district Administration building. This school previously served as the high school until the current high school was built in 1971. It is also the site of Bulldog Stadium. The principal is Nikki Gauthier.

Clubs and Organizations -CMS

- Athletics
- CMS Band
- Choir
- Theater Arts
- Builders Club
- Canine Christians
- Student Council
- T.A.F.E. (Texas Association of Future Educators)
- Twirlers
- UIL Academic
- UIL Literary
- Yearbook
- Washing D.C. Club
- National Elementary Honor Society

=== C.O. Wilson Middle School ===
- C.O. Wilson Middle School is located at 2620 Helena Ave. The school was named after former Nederland Superintendent C.0. Wilson. The principal is Principal Tina Oliver.

Clubs and Organizations CO Wilson

- Athletics
- Student Council
- Bullpup Believers
- Cheerleading
- National JR. Honor Society
- Builders Club

=== Elementary Schools (Grades PK-5) ===
- Helena Park Elementary School-Principal Charlotte Junot
- Highland Park Elementary School-Principal Sissy Dainwood
- Hillcrest Elementary School-Principal Torrey Gomez
- Langham Elementary School-Principal Heather Barrow

=== Other ===
- Alternative Campus-Principal Jared Walker

=== 2019 bond ===
In May 2019 voters approved a $155 million bond issue to improve facilities at all campuses. This bond includes:

- $82.7 million to replace the high school; the new school will be built at the same location
- 49.1 million for upgrades and new construction at all four elementary schools
- 11.1 million for upgrades and improvements at both middle schools
- 4.8 million for technology upgrades at all campuses
- 3.4 million for safety and security upgrades at all campuses
- 4.5 million for upgrades to Bulldog Stadium

== Demographics ==
Nederland ISD serves 5,372 students throughout the 8 schools in the district. 1,576 of those students attend Nederland High School. The student demographics breakdown to 53% White, 27.1% Hispanic, 9.0% African American, 6.8% Asian and .5% American Indian. 10.4% of the students are in Special Education. 3.5% are in Gifted and talented classes, and 24.7% take Career and Technology education.

== Notable alumni ==
- Davy Arnaud, professional soccer player for Major League Soccer's Montreal Impact
- Tim Foust, country music singer/songwriter, bass vocalist for the a cappella group Home Free
- Brian Sanches, pitcher for the MLB's Houston Astros
- Karen Silkwood, chemical worker and labor union activist
- Will Jardell, professional model best known for becoming runner up in cycle 21 of America's Next Top Model with Tyra Banks
- John Varley, Hugo and Nebula award-winning science-fiction author
