= List of storms named Humberto =

List of storms that share the same or similar names

The name Humberto has been used for six tropical cyclones in the Atlantic Ocean. The name replaced Hugo, which was retired after the 1989 season.

- Hurricane Humberto (1995) – Category 2 hurricane that remained in open sea
- Hurricane Humberto (2001) – Category 2 hurricane that passed near Bermuda but caused no damage
- Hurricane Humberto (2007) – rapidly intensifying Category 1 hurricane, made landfall in Texas causing one death and $50 million in damage
- Hurricane Humberto (2013) – Category 1 hurricane that brought squalls to the Cape Verde Islands
- Hurricane Humberto (2019) – Category 3 hurricane that impacted Bermuda
- Hurricane Humberto (2025) – Category 5 hurricane that passed between Bermuda and the East Coast of the United States; had steering effect on Hurricane Imelda

The name Humberto was also once unofficially used for a subtropical cyclone in the Southern Hemisphere:

- Subtropical Storm Humberto (2022) – formed in the open ocean, without affecting land
