= Nederland High School =

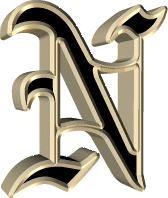

Location
- 2101 18th Street; Nederland, Texas 77627; United States; 29°58′55″N 94°00′42″W

Information
- School type: Public high school
- Established: 1924
- School district: Nederland Independent School District
- Superintendent: Stuart Kieschnick
- Principal: Natalie Gomez
- Teaching staff: 111.74 (FTE)
- Grades: 9-12
- Enrollment: 1,482 (2023–2024)
- Student to teacher ratio: 13.26
- Colors: Black & Gold
- Athletics conference: UIL Class AAAAA
- Mascot: Bulldog
- Website: nhs.nederlandisd.org
- Nederland High School in the 1920s

Nederland High School is a public high school located in the city of Nederland, Texas. It is part of the Nederland Independent School District which covers a portion of eastern Jefferson County, including all of Nederland and portions of Port Neches, Port Arthur, and Beaumont. In 2013, the school was rated "Met Standard" by the Texas Education Agency.

== History ==
Nederland Independent School District was officially organized in 1920, and the first high school was built in 1924 on the property where the Alternative Campus now resides at the 500 block of 12th Street. The new school was needed to accommodate students moving into the city due to the Pure Oil refinery being built. Athletics and the Nederland Band were organized in 1925 by C. 0. Wilson when he moved from Port Neches to Nederland. The current school was constructed in 1971 on N. 18th Street.

== Performing Arts Theater ==
The Nederland Performing Arts Theater is located on the campus of Nederland High School and hosts performances for the high school, in addition to plays and concerts for the community. It also houses the Nederland High School Band and the Nederland Drama Department. The center was built in 1999 from a bond that was passed by the voters.

== Athletics ==
The Nederland Bulldogs compete in the following sports:

- Cross Country
- Volleyball
- Football
- Basketball
- Powerlifting
- Swimming/Diving
- Soccer
- Golf
- Tennis
- Track
- Softball
- Baseball

The Bulldogs rival is Port Neches-Groves.

=== State titles ===
- Football
  - 1957(3A)
- Boys Track
  - 1963(2A)

== Notable alumni ==
- Davy Arnaud - Professional soccer player
- Tim Foust - Bass vocalist for the a cappella group Home Free
- Brian Sanches - Former major league baseball pitcher
- Karen Silkwood - Chemical worker and labor union activist
- Will Jardell - Professional model, best known for becoming runner up on America's Next Top Model (season 21) with Tyra Banks
- John Varley - Hugo and Nebula award-winning science-fiction author
- Eric Cammack - Former major league baseball pitcher
