= TPC =

TPC may refer to:

== Organizations ==
- Tax Policy Center, for US tax analysis
- Technology Professionals Canada
- Texas Professional Communicators
- Trade Practices Commission, Australia
- Transaction Processing Performance Council, developing benchmark specifications for database systems
- Tropical Prediction Center, of the US National Hurricane Center
- TPC Group, a petrochemicals manufacturing company based in Houston, Texas, US
- Taiwan Police College, a police academy in Taiwan
- Taiwan Power Company
- The Pokémon Company
- Carabinieri Art Squad or Carabinieri T.P.C. (Tutela del Patrimonio Culturale), a law enforcement division in Italy
- Turkish Petroleum Company, renamed Iraq Petroleum Company in 1925

== Science and technology ==
- Table per Concrete Class, an inheritance strategy for Entity Framework
- Time projection chamber, a type of particle detector
- Thymolphthalein complexone, a chemical indicator
- Tough-pitch copper, a type of copper cable
- Trans Pacific Cable, a series of Pacific Ocean undersea cables
- Transmitter Power Control, for IEEE 802.11h-2003 WLAN
- Two-pore channel, an ion channel

== Sports ==
- Tournament Players Championship, an earlier name of The Players Championship
- Tournament Players Championship (United Kingdom), a European Tour golf tournament
- TPC at Sawgrass, US golf course
- Tournament Players Club, a chain of golf courses

== Transportation ==
- Air Calédonie (ICAO code)
- Parenzana (reporting mark), Trieste - Poreč - Kanfanar railway 1902–1935
- Transports Publics du Chablais

== Other uses ==
- Tokyo Police Club, an indie rock band from Canada
- The Perl Conference, now The Perl and Raku Conference
- Transitional Presidential Council, the interim head of state of Haiti
