= Hurricane Humberto (2019) =

Category 3 Atlantic hurricane

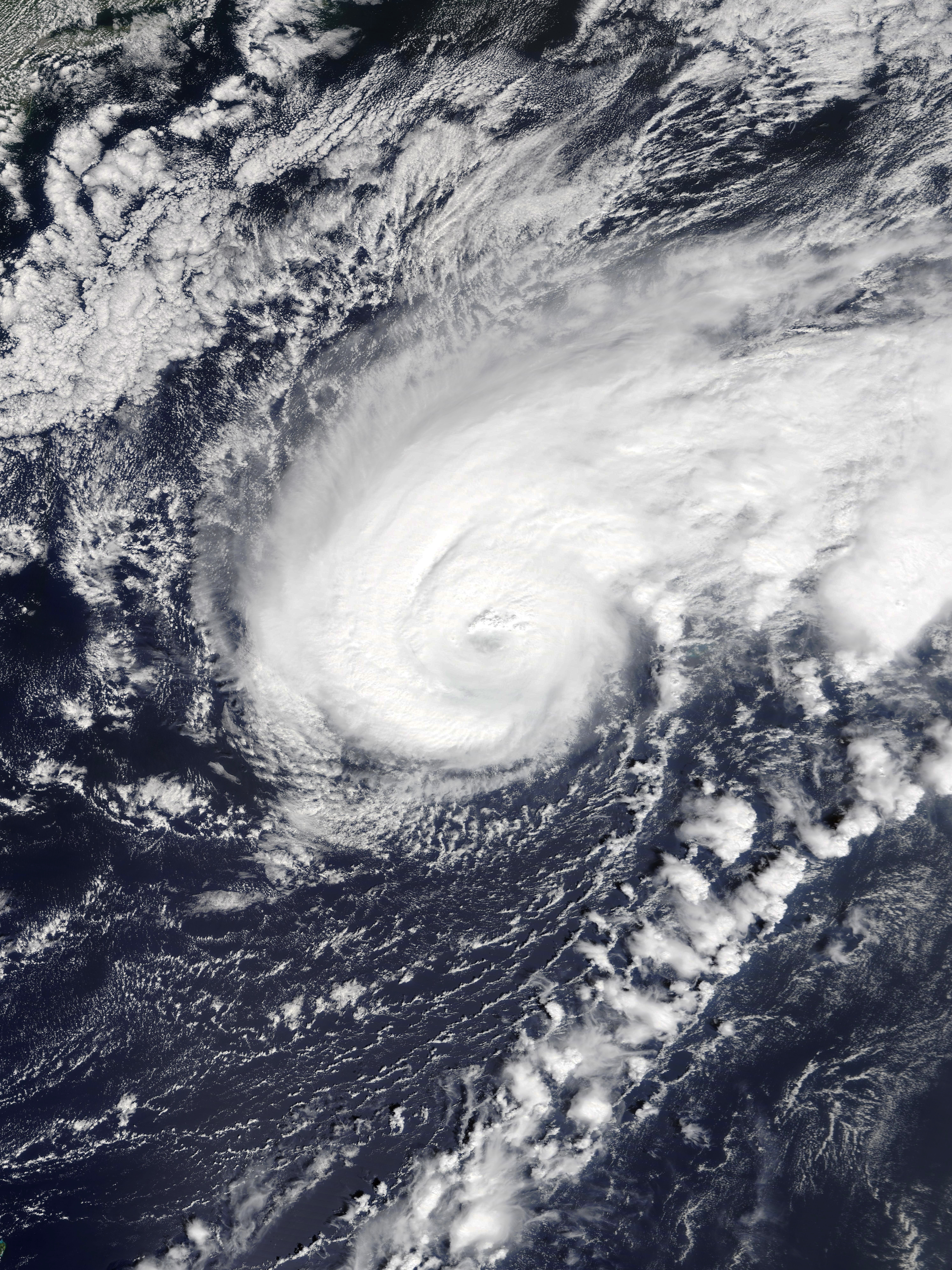
- Hurricane Humberto near peak intensity west of Bermuda on September 18

Meteorological history
- Formed: September 13, 2019
- Extratropical: September 19, 2019
- Dissipated: September 20, 2019

Category 3 major hurricane
- 1-minute sustained (SSHWS/NWS)
- Highest winds: 125 mph (205 km/h)
- Lowest pressure: 950 mbar (hPa); 28.05 inHg

Overall effects
- Fatalities: 2 total
- Damage: >$25 million (2019 USD)
- Areas affected: Bahamas, East Coast of the United States, Puerto Rico, Bermuda, Atlantic Canada
- IBTrACS
- Part of the 2019 Atlantic hurricane season

Hurricane Humberto (/uːmˈbɛərtoʊ/ oom-BAIR-toh) was a large and powerful tropical cyclone that caused extensive wind damage in Bermuda during September 2019. It was the eighth named storm, third hurricane, and second major hurricane – Category 3 or higher on the Saffir–Simpson scale – of the 2019 Atlantic hurricane season. Humberto formed on September 13 from the prolonged interaction of a tropical wave and an upper-level trough, then paralleled the eastern coastline of Florida through September 16 before turning sharply northeastward. A generally favorable environment allowed Humberto to become a hurricane that day, and the storm further strengthened to reach peak intensity as a Category 3 hurricane on September 18. After its center passed within 65 miles (105 km) of Bermuda around 00:00 UTC on September 19, the system encountered stronger wind shear and drier air. Stripped of its deep thunderstorm activity, the system transitioned to a potent extratropical cyclone early on September 20.

Forming on the heels of Hurricane Dorian two weeks prior, Humberto proved far less destructive throughout the Bahamas, producing only some squally weather. The eastern coastline of Florida saw tropical storm-force wind gusts, choppy seas, and light rainfall. Rip currents caused one death in Florida and another in North Carolina. In Bermuda, coastal flooding and rainfall were limited by low astronomical tides and Humberto's quick forward motion. However, peak surface winds of around 110 mph (180 km/h), with higher gusts, caused widespread damage to trees, roofs, crops, and power lines, most notably on the western end of the island chain. Some 90% of Bermuda's banana crop was lost. As many as 600 buildings suffered roof damage, while 27,900 customers were left without power; though most of the network was quickly repaired, some electric outages persisted for at least 10 days. L.F. Wade International Airport and the Bermuda Weather Service campus both suffered property damage. In total, the hurricane wrought over $25 million in damage throughout Bermuda. Hurricane Jerry to the south briefly posed a threat to the territory as cleanup from Humberto got underway, but it ultimately dissipated with no ill-effects.

== Meteorological history ==
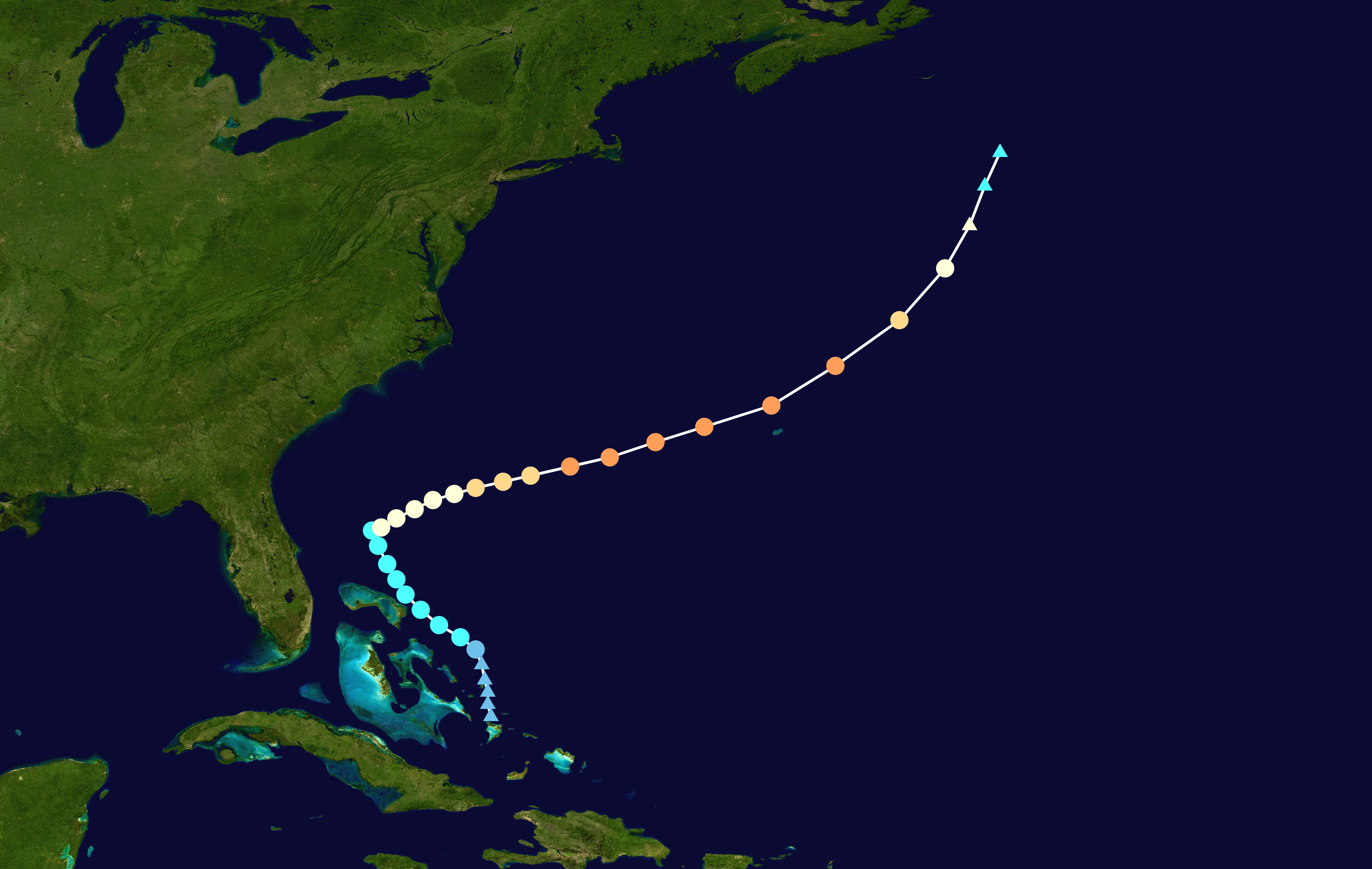
Map plotting the storm's track and intensity, according to the Saffir–Simpson scale Map key Saffir–Simpson scale Tropical depression (≤38 mph, ≤62 km/h) Tropical storm (39–73 mph, 63–118 km/h) Category 1 (74–95 mph, 119–153 km/h) Category 2 (96–110 mph, 154–177 km/h) Category 3 (111–129 mph, 178–208 km/h) Category 4 (130–156 mph, 209–251 km/h) Category 5 (≥157 mph, ≥252 km/h) Unknown Storm type Tropical cyclone Subtropical cyclone Extratropical cyclone, remnant low, tropical disturbance, or monsoon depression

The origins of Hurricane Humberto trace back to a tropical wave that exited the western coast of Africa on August 27, 2019. Accompanied by little convective activity, the disturbance moved westward across the Atlantic for several days. On September 4, the wave encountered a mid- to upper-level trough of low pressure several hundred miles east of the Lesser Antilles. Resistance from the trough split the wave in two; the southern portion proceeded through the Windward Islands, while the northern portion of the wave moved toward the northwest in tandem with the trough. As the trough became negatively tilted, or oriented northwest-to-southeast, strengthening anticyclonic flow on its east side promoted periods of enhanced convection close to the tropical wave. These convective bursts, largely driven by diurnal cycles, led to the development of a broad surface low on the morning of September 12 as the disturbance turned north-northwest through the Turks and Caicos Islands. At 21:00 UTC, the National Hurricane Center (NHC) upgraded the disturbance to a potential tropical cyclone, given that it posed a threat to land but its circulation did not yet meet the organization necessary to designate a tropical cyclone. This facilitated the issuance of tropical storm warnings in the Bahamas. Observations from ships and nearby islands early on September 13 indicated that the low-level center had become better defined, and satellite imagery depicted the formation of a narrow curved spiral band in the disturbance's northeastern quadrant. Based on this evidence, the NHC estimated that a tropical depression formed around 18:00 UTC on September 13, approximately 85 miles (137 km) east of Eleuthera in the Bahamas. It intensified into Tropical Storm Humberto six hours later.

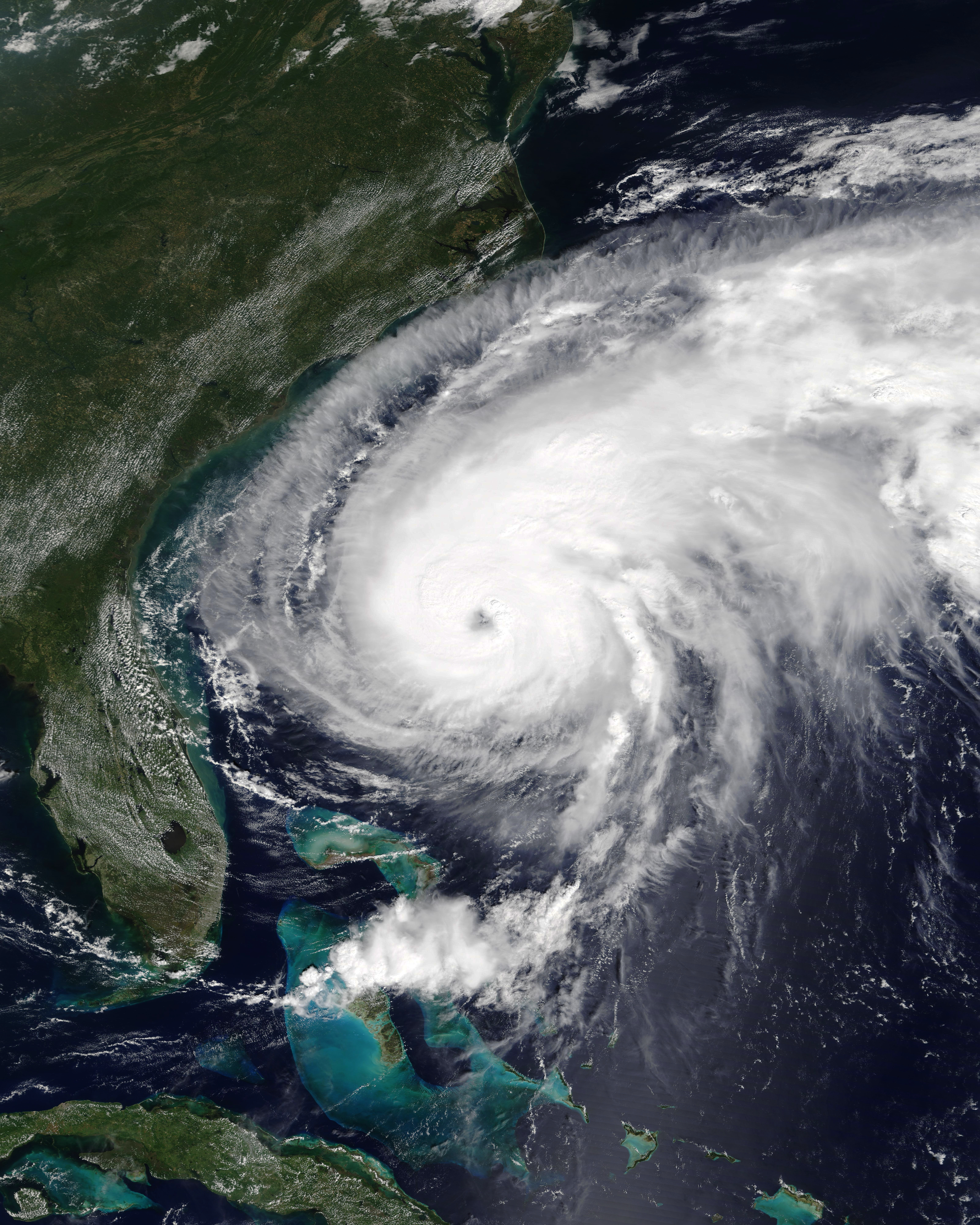
Humberto as a Category 1 hurricane northwest of the Bahamas and Florida on September 16

The newly formed storm slowly turned northwestward as it tracked toward a weakness in the Azores High. Dry air and wind shear imparted by the trough that contributed to Humberto's genesis now inhibited organization, and the tropical storm more closely resembled a subtropical cyclone rather than a fully tropical one during September 14. As the day progressed, reconnaissance missions found a more aligned storm center, an indication that upper-level winds were beginning to relent. Banding features flourished, upper-level outflow expanded, and a formative inner core became apparent. By 00:00 UTC on September 16, Humberto intensified into the season's third hurricane as it temporarily stalled about 175 miles (282 km) east-northeast of Cape Canaveral, Florida. From that point, a broad upper-level trough over the East Coast of the United States steered the cyclone sharply toward the northeast. While moving over sea surface temperatures of around 84°F (29°C), Humberto intensified during the next day. The hurricane developed a large eye, 35–40 miles (56–64 km) in diameter, surrounded by very cold cloud tops, a hallmark of intense thunderstorm activity. Data from a reconnaissance aircraft mission on the evening of September 17 was used as the basis for upgrading Humberto to a Category 3 hurricane around 00:00 UTC on September 18. This upgrade was applied despite a broad and asymmetric wind field that was most expansive in the southern semicircle.

As Humberto passed about 65 miles (105 km) northwest of Bermuda around 00:00 UTC on September 19, it reached maximum sustained winds of 125 mph (201 km/h). Some satellite intensity estimates supported Category 4 status, and a dropsonde in the southern eyewall measured winds aloft of 159 mph (256 km/h), in addition to surface winds of 131 mph (211 km/h). However, these values were recorded at two-second intervals and, consequently, were not representative of sustained winds. Additionally, weather radar imagery from Bermuda indicated a quickly eroding eyewall. Therefore, the strongest winds were likely the result of extratropical processes producing a wind maximum akin to a sting jet, which would not be indicative of Humberto's true strength as a tropical cyclone. As Humberto accelerated ahead of the encroaching upper-level trough to its west, it encountered even stronger upper-level winds and drier air that together triggered a weakening trend. By 00:00 UTC on September 20, the system had become devoid of organized deep convection, marking its transition to an extratropical cyclone while located 575 miles (925 km) south-southwest of Cape Race, Newfoundland. The post-tropical cyclone continued to produce a large area of gale-force winds until it merged with an even larger extratropical low around 18:00 UTC on September 20.

== Preparations ==
Immediately upon the designation of a potential tropical cyclone, tropical storm warnings were issued for the northwestern Bahamas, except Andros Island. At 03:00 UTC on September 13, a tropical storm watch was issued for the east coast of the Florida Peninsula between Jupiter Inlet and the Volusia–Brevard County line. After an expansion northward to include more of the Florida coastline, the watch was canceled early the next day.

A tropical storm watch was issued for Bermuda at 21:00 UTC on September 16 and was upgraded to a hurricane warning 24 hours later. All tropical cyclone watches and warnings were discontinued by 06:00 UTC on September 19, after the storm's departure. Changes in the hurricane's structure as it approached the territory posed some forecasting challenges, especially concerning the arrival time and magnitude of damaging winds. Ahead of the storm, eight cruise ships were diverted away from Bermuda. As early as September 16, L.F. Wade International Airport officials requested that vehicles be moved out of the flood-prone long-term parking area. As conditions deteriorated, the airport closed at 19:00 UTC on September 18, resulting in the cancellation of twelve commercial flights. Aircraft were also evacuated from the airport during the closure. "The Causeway", a route connecting the airport to the territory's population centers, was closed as a precautionary measure shortly after a public curfew took effect at 21:00 UTC on September 18. Ferry services were suspended at the same time, while buses stopped running in the late afternoon.

The government opened its only official hurricane shelter in the Cedarbridge Academy. It was staffed by 30 people from various agencies and provided accommodation for up to 100 residents. Individuals who lived on boats or who felt unsafe in their homes were encouraged to take advantage of the facility. Ultimately, nearly 50 people sought refuge there. In an effort to communicate storm dangers to the public, Bermuda's government held a public press conference, activated the Emergency Measures Organisation's emergency broadcast radio station, and sent updates to users of a new official mobile app called Tree Frog, introduced just months prior. Governor John Rankin placed 120 members of the Royal Bermuda Regiment on standby, and ambulances and Bermuda Electric Light Company (BELCO) crews were pre-positioned in strategic locations across the island. Schools, businesses, and governmental offices were closed at 16:00 UTC on September 18. The Bermuda Stock Exchange was also closed on September 18 and 19. Many boat owners removed their vessels from marinas to secure them on land.

== Impacts ==
=== The Bahamas ===
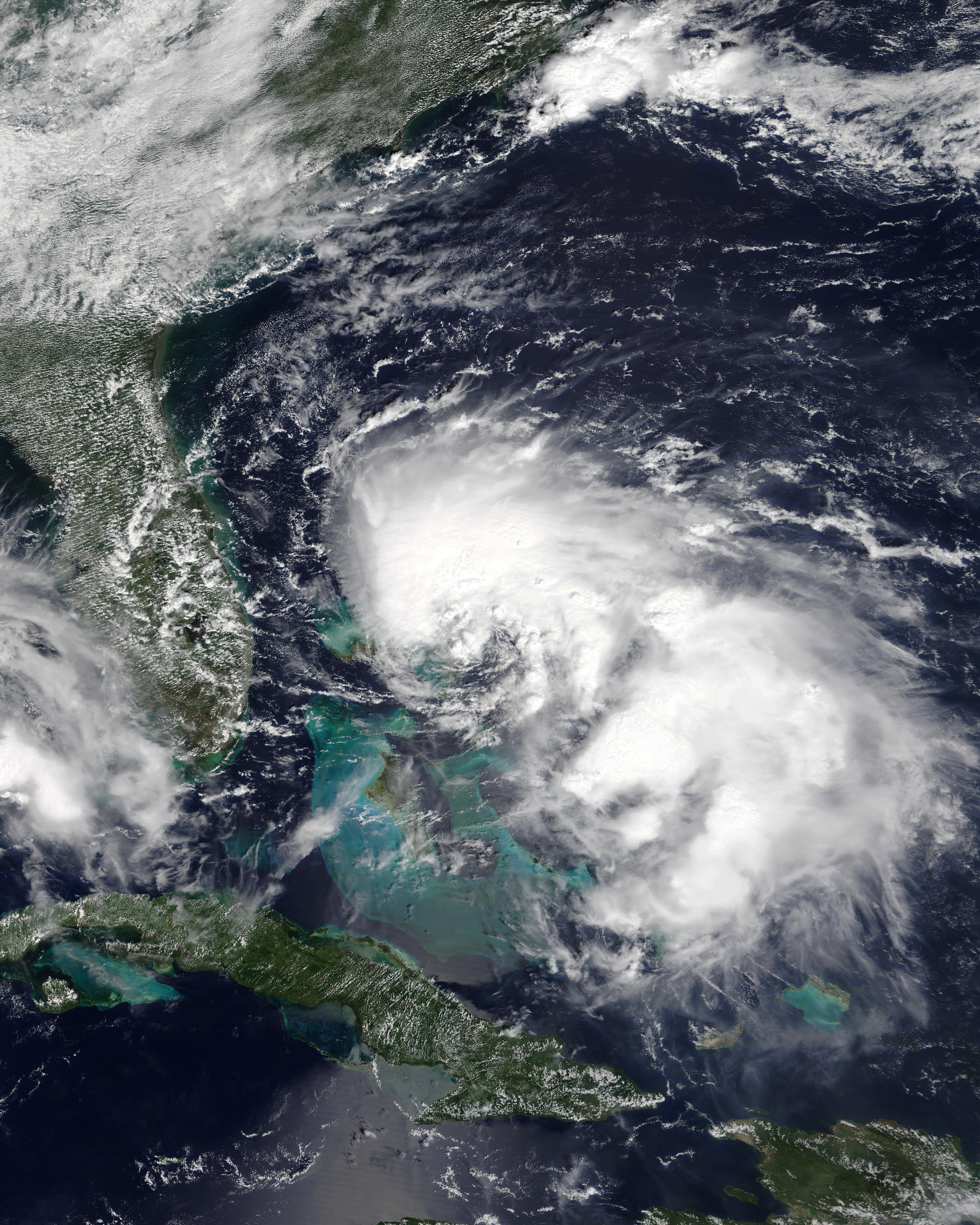
Tropical Storm Humberto passing east of the Bahamas and Florida on September 14

Devastated by Hurricane Dorian earlier in the month, the Bahamas were spared significant compounding effects from Tropical Storm Humberto. Grand Bahama International Airport in the northwestern part of the country reported ten-minute sustained winds of just 29 mph (47 km/h) as the storm passed to the east, and rainfall totals were light. Humberto's proximity to the disaster area caused small airfields being used in the distribution of emergency supplies to be closed briefly.

=== United States ===
Rip currents produced by Humberto affected the East Coast of the United States for several days. Conditions were particularly treacherous in northeastern Florida, where strong onshore winds and resulting choppy seas made ocean rescues difficult. In St. Johns County, 21 bathers were rescued from rough seas on September 14 and 15. One rip current victim in the county was found dead after a two-day search, while another was hospitalized in critical condition. In Duval County, wind gusts on the periphery of Humberto reached 45 mph (72 km/h). Florida's eastern coastline also experienced a minor 1 to 1.5 ft (0.30 to 0.46 m) storm surge and light rainfall. Farther north, in Topsail Beach, North Carolina, a 62-year-old man drowned after wading into shallow water and getting caught in a rip current.

As the storm grew in strength and size, powerful swells propagated southward to the northern coast of Puerto Rico. In addition to coastal flooding, extensive beach erosion damaged some waterfront structures in Espinar, Agunda.

=== Bermuda ===
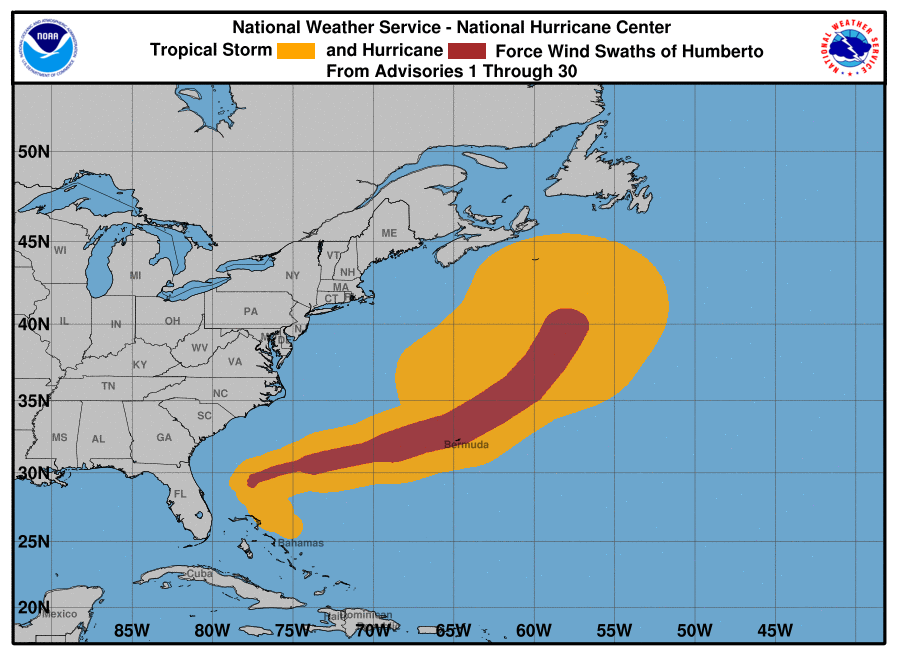
Hurricane Humberto's wind swath with hurricane-force winds in red and tropical-storm force winds were in orange.

Powerful westerly winds were the most severe aspect of the hurricane in Bermuda. The highest wind speeds occurred during a relatively brief period between 23:00 UTC on September 18 and 02:00 UTC on September 19, coinciding with the closest approach of Humberto's center. At the height of the storm, rapid fluctuations in air pressure and temperature were observed concurrently with highly turbulent wind patterns. Though unconfirmed, localized tornadic activity in Humberto's right-front quadrant may have been responsible for instances of isolated damage hours before hurricane-force winds spread across the islands. The quick-moving system was accompanied by only 1.57 in (40 mm) of rain, insufficient to wash away foliage-burning salt residue. Peak storm surge values were under 3 ft (0.91 m), and low astronomical tides prevented any significant coastal flooding. The lowest air pressure recorded in Bermuda was 970.4 mbar (28.66 inHg), and the highest waves in the seas off the territory's northern coast were analyzed near 42 ft (13 m).

Analysis of observations from a buoy located 9 mi (14 km) off the northwestern coast indicated that parts of Bermuda experienced sustained winds near Category 3 intensity. The instrument recorded ten-minute average winds of 94 mph (151 km/h) gusting to 130 mph (210 km/h), at an elevation of 20 ft (6.1 m). Adjusting for standard elevation and then converting to a one-minute average yields estimated maximum sustained winds of about 110 mph (180 km/h). On Pearl Island, one-minute sustained winds reached 100 mph (160 km/h), punctuated by gusts as high as 123 mph (198 km/h). L.F. Wade International Airport recorded ten-minute average sustained winds of 82 mph (132 km/h) and a gust of 116 mph (187 km/h). Elevated stations registered even more powerful winds; at 290 ft (88 m) above sea level, the Maritime Operations Centre on St. George's Island measured gusts to 144 mph (232 km/h). A private anemometer on the roof of the historical Commissioner's House (part of the National Museum of Bermuda) recorded an extreme wind gust of 192 mph (309 km/h), but both the National Hurricane Center and Bermuda Weather Service believe this value to have been artificially inflated by the flow of air over the building.

These intense winds caused extensive damage, particularly to trees, roofs, and power lines; the worst effects were concentrated in western areas. An estimated 500–600 buildings sustained roof damage, among them being the Somerset Police Station and an African Methodist Episcopal Church in Sandys Parish. This corresponds with the 600 storm-related insurance claims received by three local firms by September 24. Humberto left more than 27,900 electricity customers, around 80% of the territory, without power. Many farmers suffered significant losses of fruit and vegetable crops; in particular, 90% of the banana crop was destroyed, requiring an estimated 18 months to recover. This worsened an ongoing shortage of bananas caused by pest insect infestations in imports of the fruit. Live plants, including poinsettias and vegetable seedlings, died in conjunction with the destruction of nursery greenhouses.

At the airport, security fences and a jet bridge were badly damaged. In the Royal Naval Dockyard, a shipping container blew into the water and presumably sank. A man attempting to ride out the storm on his yacht was briefly imperiled when the vessel broke free from its moorings and eventually wrecked on an island in the Great Sound. Off the northern shore, the wreck of the paddle steamer Montana, a popular dive site, was heavily damaged. The Bermuda Weather Service campus suffered the loss of a satellite dish, antennas, and the weather balloon launching platform, which was blown off its foundation. The agency also lost communication with its Doppler weather radar system near the height of the storm. No major damage was reported in the capital city of Hamilton, though some city parks were closed to the public due to unsafe conditions. The Bermuda Fire and Rescue Service responded to numerous calls for minor fires and other incidents. In total, Humberto caused more than $25 million in damage to Bermuda. Despite the severity of the storm and breadth of damage, no deaths or serious injuries were attributed to the hurricane in the territory.

== Aftermath ==
In the wake of the hurricane, fallen or low-hanging trees and power lines left some Bermuda roads impassable, so officials advised residents to remain indoors. From the early morning hours on September 19, the Royal Bermuda Regiment assisted government agencies in removing debris from roads. To accommodate the influx of horticultural debris, the Marsh Folly Composting Facility waived its gate fee for disposal of vegetation. The Causeway was reopened to traffic around midday on September 19 following assessments by structural engineers. L.F. Wade International Airport reopened around the same time once repairs to the damaged fencing had been rushed to completion. Government offices, businesses, and most ferry routes resumed normal operations on September 20, while public schools remained closed for an additional day while building evaluations were underway. As BELCO crews repaired the electricity infrastructure, the number of power outages fell to 10,000 by the morning of September 21 and to 1,000 on September 26. The company, which is Bermuda's only electricity supplier, received help from retired employees and mutual aid from another utility company based in the United States. Restoration was temporarily slowed by several utility pole fires caused by salt corrosion. A small number of outages persisted 10 days after the storm. Despite swift cleanup in most locations, a few small streets and parts of the Bermuda Railway Trail remained blocked for several weeks.

Immediately after the hurricane, damaged structures were temporarily protected by tarps. Bermuda's Department of Planning relaxed its requirements for building permits to fix certain types of storm-related damage. As a consequence of an ongoing slate tile shortage caused by the inability of local quarries to meet demand, permanent roof repairs were delayed for many residents. With intensifying Hurricane Jerry to the south also considered a potential threat, preparedness measures resumed almost immediately after Humberto's passage. However, Jerry degenerated into a remnant low-pressure system before reaching Bermuda, resulting in only a brief period of inclement weather. Premier of the British Virgin Islands Andrew Fahie expressed that his government was prepared to help Bermuda cope with the effects of hurricanes Humberto and Jerry.

== See also ==
- Weather of 2019
- Tropical cyclones in 2019
- List of Bermuda hurricanes
- List of Florida hurricanes (2000–present)
- List of North Carolina hurricanes (2000–present)
- Other storms of the same name
