= TPC Group =

Petrochemical manufacturing company

TPC Group, previously known as Texas Petrochemicals, is a petrochemicals manufacturing company based in Houston, Texas, and is a large producer of butadiene, MTBE, and polyisobutylene. TPC has operations in Houston and Port Neches, Texas, and Lake Charles, Louisiana.

== Products ==
In 2011, TPC led the market in butadiene (35% market share), butene-1 (35% market share), polyisobutylene (PIB) (60% market share), and was near the top of the market in both isobutylene and propylene derivatives.

== History ==
The Houston plant was authorized in 1942 as part of the United States Rubber Reserve Program, and opened in 1944 operated by Sinclair Rubber. It was subsequently purchased by a joint venture of Tenneco and FMC Corporation in 1955, and the joint venture was named Petro-Tex Chemical Corporation, also known as PTC Corporation, until sold to Texas Olefins in 1984. and later Texas Olefins also changed its name to Texas Petrochemicals in 1984. Texas Petrochemicals was acquired by the private equity firm Sterling Group in 1996. In 2003, a collapse of the MTBE market forced Texas Petrochemicals (now employee owned via a LBO) into bankruptcy. The company emerged from bankruptcy under new ownership in 2004.

The Port Neches, Texas, plant—also authorized by Rubber Reserve—opened in 1943 operated by Neches Butane Products Company. It was purchased by Texaco in 1980, and later it was purchased by Huntsman Corporation in 1994, then purchased by Texas Petrochemicals in 2006.

Texas Petrochemicals changed its name to TPC Group in 2010.

TPC Group was taken private in 2012 by First Reserve Corporation and SK Capital Partners, in a deal worth approximately $850 million, after a bidding war with Innospec. The merger was approved by shareholders in December 2012.

TPC sold its Baytown, Texas, propylene derivatives facility to SI Group in 2016.

Michael T. McDonnell was the CEO from 2011 to 2015. McDonnell is currently the head of General Cable. Edward J. Dineen is the current CEO, starting in 2016. Dineen was previously CEO at Siluria Technologies, CEO at LS9, Inc, and COO of LyondellBasell. Dineen is also on the board of the American Fuel and Petrochemical Manufacturers.

On June 1, 2022, TPC Group filed for Chapter 11 bankruptcy. Among reasons cited were the 2019 explosion at its facility in Port Neches, TX (which now only terminals chemicals instead of producing them), the COVID-19 pandemic, Winter Storm Uri in 2021, and higher prices for commodities and energy.

== Locations ==
- Corporate headquarters – Houston
- Houston, TX operations, headquarters
- Baytown, TX operations (former, sold in 2016)
- Port Neches, TX (terminals, former operating plant)
- Lake Charles, Louisiana (terminals)

== Port Neches explosions ==
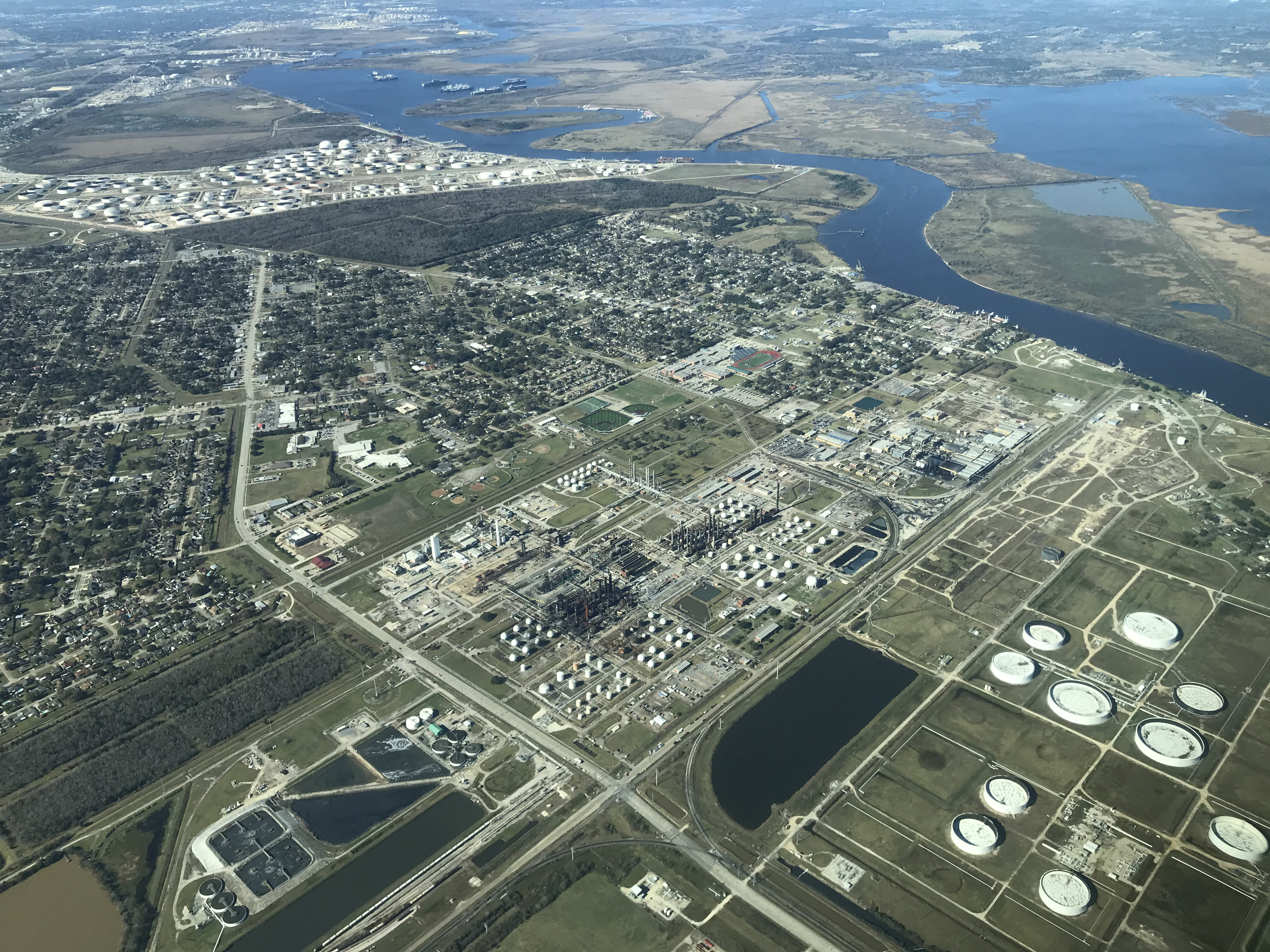
December 11th, 2019, aerial view of TPC plant and surrounding area

A processing unit at TPC's Port Neches butadiene manufacturing plant exploded in a series of explosions on Wednesday, November 27, 2019, the eve of Thanksgiving Day, and a fire raged at the facility. 60,000 residents were evacuated within four miles of the facility, including parts of Port Neches, Nederland, Groves, and Port Arthur, Texas. The mandatory evacuation was lifted on Friday morning. Four workers were injured, none seriously. Local residents reported respiratory, eye and throat pain caused by the acrid smoke from the fire at the Port Neches facility.

In 2018, the Port Neches facility released the second-highest illegal amount of cancer-causing butadiene in Texas. The November 27 explosions were part of a series of major explosions in 2019 in Texas's petrochemical corridor. Environmental advocacy organizations helped organize residents to demand more consequential action from the Texas Commission on Environmental Quality (TCEQ) than what they described as the typical inadequate fines imposed by the TCEQ for violations by the petrochemical industry. In response to the detailed testimony by residents concerning the November 27 explosions and fire, the TCEQ referred the matter for criminal prosecution.
