= Port Neches, Texas =

- City
- Location of Port Neches, Texas
- Coordinates: 29°59′20″N 93°57′42″W
- Country: United States
- State: Texas
- County: Jefferson

Area
  - Total: 9.12 sq mi (23.62 km^{2})
  - Land: 8.65 sq mi (22.41 km^{2})
  - Water: 0.47 sq mi (1.21 km^{2})
- Elevation: 16 ft (4.9 m)

Population (2020)
  - Total: 13,692
  - Density: 1,462.5/sq mi (564.68/km^{2})
- Time zone: UTC-6 (Central (CST))
  - Summer (DST): UTC-5 (CDT)
- ZIP code: 77651
- Area code: 409
- FIPS code: 48-58940
- GNIS feature ID: 2411465
- Website: ci.port-neches.tx.us

Port Neches is a city in Jefferson County, Texas, United States. The population was 13,692 at the 2020 census, an increase over the figure of 13,040 tabulated in 2010. It is part of the Beaumont–Port Arthur metropolitan area.

== History ==
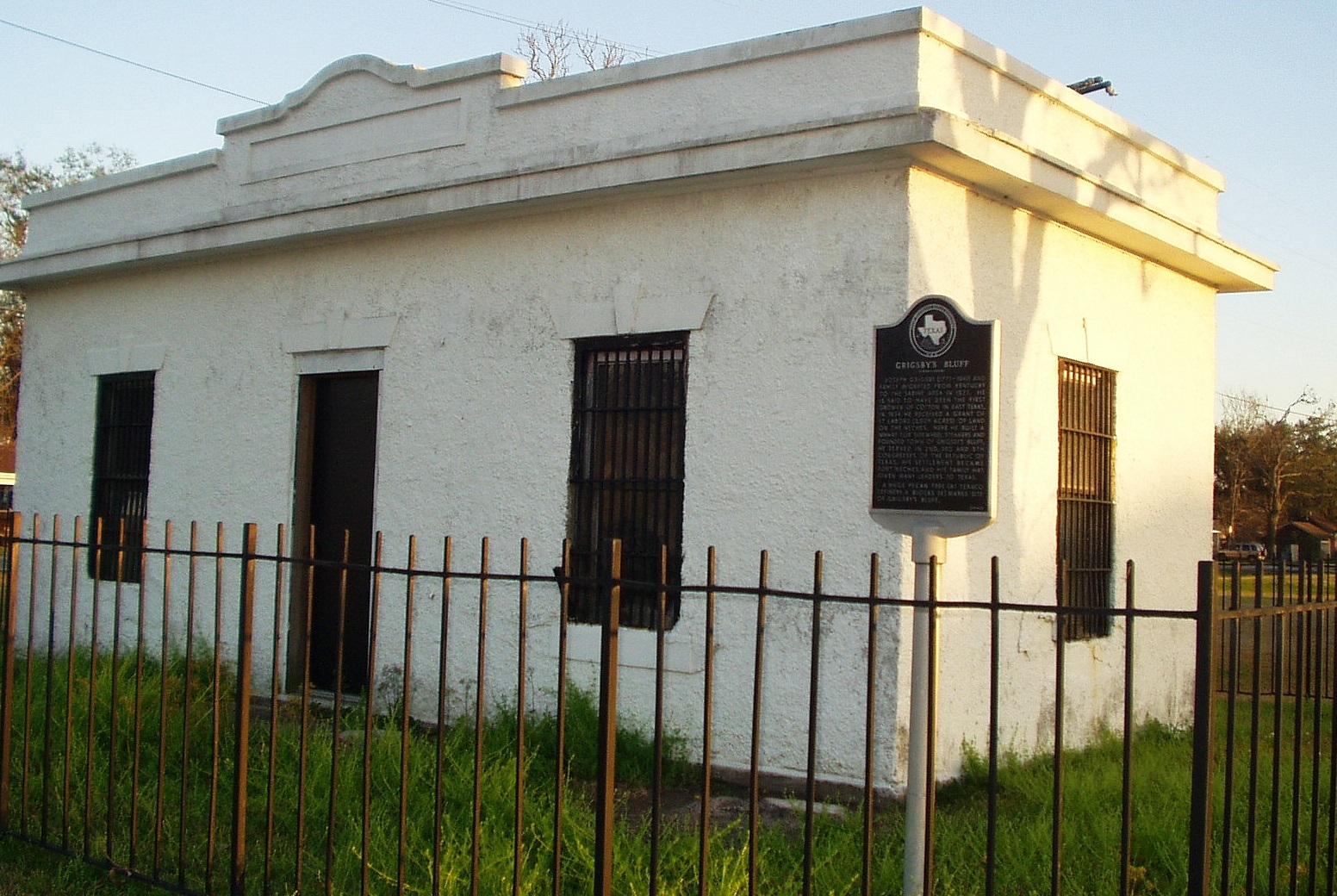
Grigsby's Bluff Jail, Port Neches

The area known as Port Neches was once inhabited by tribes of the coastal-dwelling Karankawa and Atakapa Native Americans. Smith's Bluff (the future site of Sun Oil and Union Oil of California riverside property) and Grigsby's Bluff (now Port Neches) were the only two high land bluffs on the Neches River south of Beaumont, whose name is believed to have been derived from the Caddo word "Nachawi", meaning "wood of the bow", after Spanish settlers called it Río Neches. Before 1780, Grigsby's Bluff, specifically that part of Port Neches immediately east of Port Neches Park, had been a Native American town for at least 1,500 years, at first of the Karankawa tribe, whose 7-foot (210 cm) skeletons were often found in the burial mounds there; and after 1650 of the Nacazils, a sub-tribe of the Attakapas, who were a short and stocky people before their extinction about 1780. As of 1841, there were six large burial mounds at Grigsby's Bluff, size about 60 feet (18 m) wide, 20 feet (6.1 m) tall, and 100 yards (91 m) long, consisting entirely of clam and sea shells, skeletons, pottery shards, and other Native American artifacts. Between 1841 and 1901, all six of the mounds disappeared, a result of human actions. Grigsby's Bluff became a post office in 1859 (there was also a store and sawmill there), but the office was discontinued in 1893.

Port Neches was the site of Fort Grigsby, a set of Civil War-era defenses intended to stop a Union advance up the Neches River. The fort was constructed in October 1862 and abandoned sometime after July 1863. Its guns, munitions, and stores were moved to the then-unfinished Fort Griffin, the site of the Second Battle of Sabine Pass, often credited as the most one-sided Confederate victory of the American Civil War.

A pioneer of Port Neches was Will Block Sr., born on August 2, 1870. In 2003, his son, W. T. Block Jr., was appointed a Knight of the Royal Order of Orange-Nassau for his work in reconstructing the history of Dutch settlers in the area.

The city of Port Neches was incorporated in April 1927.

The greater Neches River Basin is an attraction for fishing, hunting, birding, and boating.

TPC Group's Port Arthur Refinery, a chemical processing facility, was opened in 1944 by Neches Butane Products Co. On November 27, 2019, two explosions occurred at the plant injuring at least eight people, three of them plant workers who were treated in hospital. Several buildings, including homes, were damaged in Port Neches and the surrounding area. The blasts started a chemical fire that prompted a mandatory evacuation of approximately 60,000 residents from several nearby cities. The fire was finally put out on December 3 after burning for six days. The next day air monitors posted elevated levels of butadiene, prompting a second evacuation. The explosions occurred just days after the U.S. EPA eased chemical plant safety regulations.

== Geography ==
Port Neches is located 20 miles (32 km) inland from the Gulf of Mexico

According to the United States Census Bureau, the city has a total area of 9.1 square miles (23.6 km^{2}), of which 8.6 square miles (22.4 km^{2}) are land and 0.50 square miles (1.3 km^{2}), or 5.39%, are water.

== Demographics ==
Historical population
Census	Pop.	Note	%±
1930	2,327		—
1940	2,487		6.9%
1950	5,448		119.1%
1960	8,696		59.6%
1970	10,894		25.3%
1980	13,944		28.0%
1990	12,974		−7.0%
2000	13,601		4.8%
2010	13,040		−4.1%
2020	13,692		5.0%
U.S. Decennial Census

=== 2020 census ===
As of the 2020 census, Port Neches had a population of 13,692 people, 4,707 households, and 3,245 families residing in the city. The median age was 39.4 years, 23.3% of residents were under the age of 18, and 17.8% of residents were 65 years of age or older. For every 100 females there were 95.6 males, and for every 100 females age 18 and over there were 94.5 males age 18 and over.

99.9% of residents lived in urban areas, while 0.1% lived in rural areas.

There were 5,387 households in Port Neches, of which 32.9% had children under the age of 18 living in them. Of all households, 53.4% were married-couple households, 17.9% were households with a male householder and no spouse or partner present, and 24.4% were households with a female householder and no spouse or partner present. About 25.1% of all households were made up of individuals and 11.7% had someone living alone who was 65 years of age or older.

There were 5,874 housing units, of which 8.3% were vacant. The homeowner vacancy rate was 1.4% and the rental vacancy rate was 14.8%.

Racial composition as of the 2020 census
Race	Number	Percent
White	11,043	80.7%
Black or African American	307	2.2%
American Indian and Alaska Native	81	0.6%
Asian	473	3.5%
Native Hawaiian and Other Pacific Islander	0	0.0%
Some other race	671	4.9%
Two or more races	1,117	8.2%
Hispanic or Latino (of any race)	1,979	14.5%

=== 2000 census ===
As of the census of 2000, there were 13,601 people, 5,280 households, and 3,975 families residing in the city. The population density was 1,490.4 inhabitants per square mile (575.4/km^{2}). There were 5,656 housing units at an average density of 619.8 per square mile (239.3/km^{2}). The racial makeup of the city was 94.75% White, 0.93% African American, 0.47% Native American, 1.57% Asian, 0.01% Pacific Islander, 1.18% from other races, and 1.09% from two or more races. Hispanic or Latino of any race were 5.07% of the population.

There were 5,280 households, out of which 34.7% had children under the age of 18 living with them, 61.6% were married couples living together, 10.0% had a female householder with no husband present, and 24.7% were non-families. 21.4% of all households were made up of individuals, and 9.2% had someone living alone who was 65 years of age or older. The average household size was 2.57 and the average family size was 3.00.

In the city, the population was spread out, with 25.5% under the age of 18, 8.9% from 18 to 24, 26.9% from 25 to 44, 24.3% from 45 to 64, and 14.3% who were 65 years of age or older. The median age was 38 years. For every 100 females, there were 96.5 males. For every 100 females age 18 and over, there were 93.9 males.

The median income for a household in the city was $47,523, and the median income for a family was $53,729. Males had a median income of $43,089 versus $27,847 for females. The per capita income for the city was $22,273. About 4.4% of families and 5.6% of the population were below the poverty line, including 5.7% of those under age 18 and 4.7% of those age 65 or over.

== Education ==
Most of the city is served by the Port Neches–Groves Independent School District. Parts of the city fall within the Nederland Independent School District.

The Effie & Wilton Hebert Public Library is the community library. It was named after Wilton Hebert, who sponsored the construction of the current library. It originated with a bookmobile service established in 1930 managed by the Tyrell Public Library of Beaumont, as the Jefferson County Commissioner's Court had requested a library for people outside of Beaumont and Port Arthur the previous year. The Jefferson County Library System established a one-room library facility between 1932 and 1934, sponsored by the Lion's Club. In 1966 the George Boyd Memorial Library, named after Port Neches city employee George Travis Boyd, opened; the Port Neches city council approved of its construction in 1964. It had a cost of $75,000 with $10,000 from the municipal government. It was across from the Port Neches city hall. The current library building had its groundbreaking on Thursday, October 15, 1981, and opened on November 12, 1982.

== Controversy ==
The Port Neches-Groves Independent School District has a long history involving its continued use of their mascot, the Indians, despite years of controversy and calls of racism. Their drill team performs wearing decorative war bonnets. Their chants include the words "Scalp 'em, Indians", their yearbook is the "War Whoop", their newspaper is called "The Pow Wow news" and their stadium is called "The Reservation."

In 2020, the Cherokee Nation requested that the school stop using their mascot, rescinding an outdated approval given to the school from 1980. Despite a nearly 150,000 signature petition requesting the name change, along with the request of the Cherokee Nation, the town voted to keep the mascot.

In 2022, the Indianettes were filmed performing at Walt Disney World. According to Disney, when the school sent their audition video for approval, the Indianettes were not included and the school was instructed that their members could not wear their war bonnets during the performance. Their inclusion was not approved by Disney and was a decision made by the school. During the performance at the park, the team shouted chants of "Scalp 'em" and enacted simulated war dances. The school has not issued a statement though many residents have defended their actions and stand by their refusal to change.

After the performance, Cherokee Nation's Principal Chief, Chuck Hoskin Jr, released a statement once again requesting that the school remove the mascot stating: "Port Neches-Groves Independent School District continues to use offensive and stereotypical depictions of our tribe, and this is yet again exampled by their cheer team recently in Orlando. For the past couple of years, we have written to the Port Neches superintendent and school board asking them to cease using this offensive imagery, chanting, symbolism and other practices in their school traditions as this does nothing but dishonor us and all Native American tribes who are making great strides in this country. School leaders need educating on cultural appropriateness, should apologize for continuing to ignore our requests to stop and need to make swift changes to correct these offensive displays across their school district."

== Notable people ==
- Andrew Dismukes, comedian and writer for Saturday Night Live is a native of Port Neches
- Lee Hazlewood, country and pop singer, songwriter, and record producer
- Roschon Johnson, football player, University of Texas and Chicago Bears
- L. Q. Jones, actor and director
- Andrew Landry, professional golfer who has played on the PGA Tour since 2016
- Wade Phillips, former NFL head coach
- Tex Ritter (interred at Oak Bluff Memorial Park cemetery)
- Alli Forsythe, The Amazing Race Season 25 Contestant
