= Old Stone Fort Museum (Texas) =

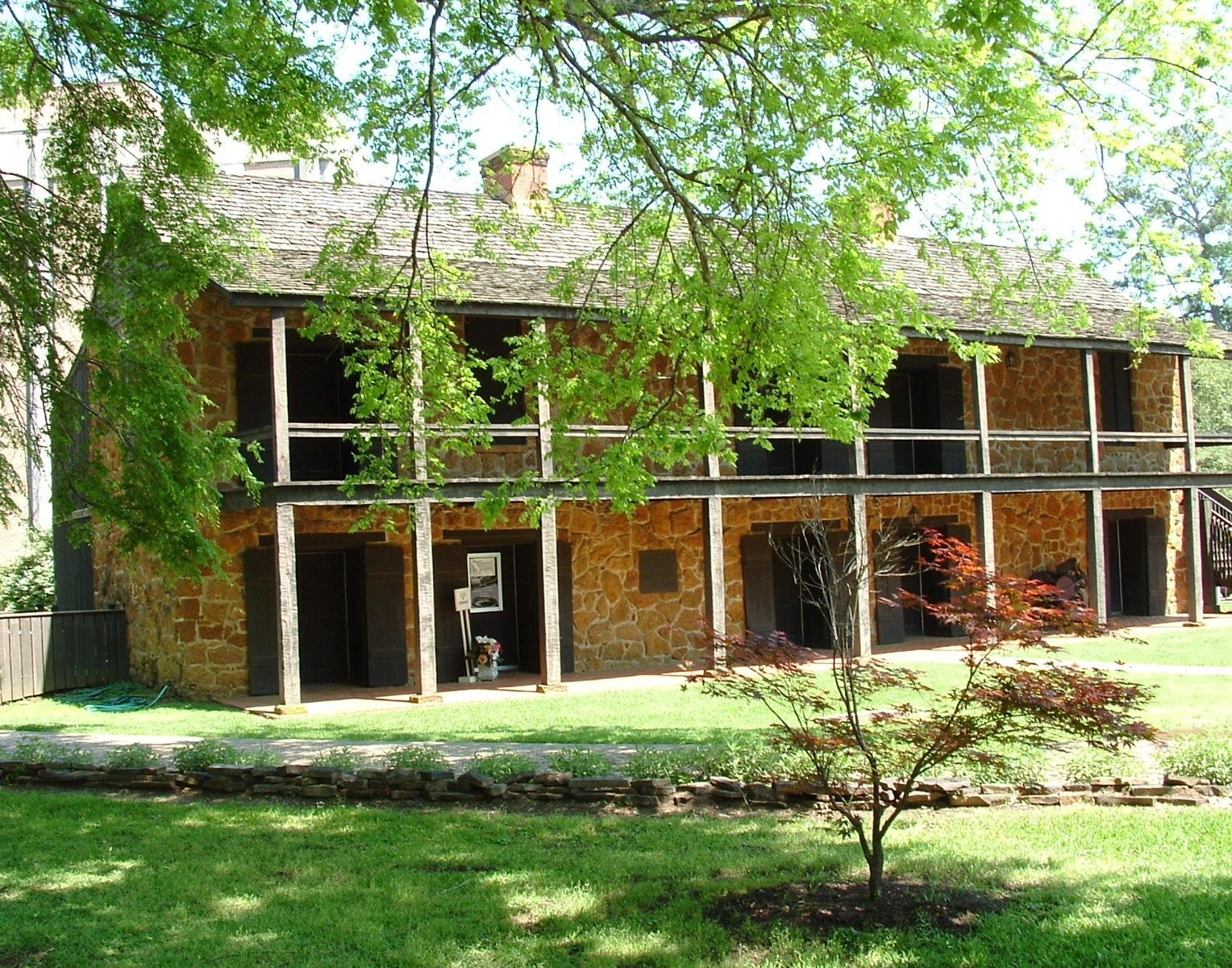
- Old Stone Fort

- Old Stone Fort Museum (the United States)
- Established: 1936
- Location: 1808 Alumni Dr. Stephen F. Austin State University; Nacogdoches, Texas
- Coordinates: 31°37′16″N 94°39′09″W
- Website: The Old Stone Fort at SFASU

Recorded Texas Historic Landmark
- Official name: Old Stone Fort
- Designated: 1962
- Reference no.: 9393

The Old Stone Fort Museum is located on the campus of Stephen F. Austin State University, in the city and county of Nacogdoches, Texas. It is a 1936 replica, at a different location, of a structure that had been erected circa 1779 by Nacogdoches militia commander Antonio Gil Y'Barbo. The original building was never a fort, in spite of its sobriquet. After more than a century serving various purposes, the original structure was demolished. The replica was erected with help from the local Cum Concilio civic organization, and funding from the New Deal economic program of the Franklin D. Roosevelt administration. The museum is open to visitors and provides historic exhibits on the grounds of the university.

== Origins and history ==
The original Old Stone Fort was built of native iron ore, circa 1779, as a mercantile house by Antonio Gil Y'Barbo. Because of its iron-brick construction, it was referred to as the Stone House. In 1805, he sold the structure to José Luis de la Bega, and in 1806, Bega sold it to William Barr. Along with fellow merchants Peter Samuel Davenport, Luther Smith, and Edward Murphy, Barr operated the House of Barr and Davenport, an import-export business catering to the indigenous tribes of the area. Davenport established his headquarters as the Nacogdoches agent for the firm in the Old Stone Fort. Davenport outlived his partners—Smith died in 1807, Murphy in 1808, and Barr in 1810—leaving Davenport as the sole proprietor. During the next several years, the structure also served as various government facilities.

Article by Lee C. Harby entitled "The Old Stone Fort of Nacogdoches" published in The American Magazine for April 1888, pp 721-725.

In a prelude to the Fredonian Rebellion, Benjamin Haden, brother to Empresario Haden Edwards, led several followers in seizing the building on December 16, 1826. Shortly thereafter, Col. José de las Piedras used the structure as his headquarters.

In 1829, John Marie Durst purchased the Stone House from Juan Benigno Davenport, Peter Samuel Davenport's son and heir. Durst and his family lived there until 1834 when he sold it to Vicente Córdova. In 1837, the Republic of Texas used the structure as a courtroom under Judge Robert McAlpin Williamson, who also was known as Three-legged Willie.

In 1838, Córdova sold the structure to John S. Roberts, one of the signers of the Texas Declaration of Independence. Roberts, a former sheriff of Natchitoches, had participated in the battle of Nacogdoches in 1832 and the Siege of Béxar in 1835. He operated a variety of commercial ventures in the structure before selling it to William and Charles Perkins. They became the last owners of the original building.

== Current structure ==
The Perkins family dismantled the building in 1902, but some of its original stones were preserved by Cum Concilio, a civic organization in Nacogdoches. In 1907, the club used the stones for a small building in Washington Square.

Decades later, the New Deal economic program of the Franklin D. Roosevelt administration provided funding for the construction of a replica of the old fort on the grounds of Stephen F. Austin State College. Dedication ceremonies were held October 16, 1936.

The Building became a museum, which is open to visitors and hosts historic exhibits.

== Gallery ==
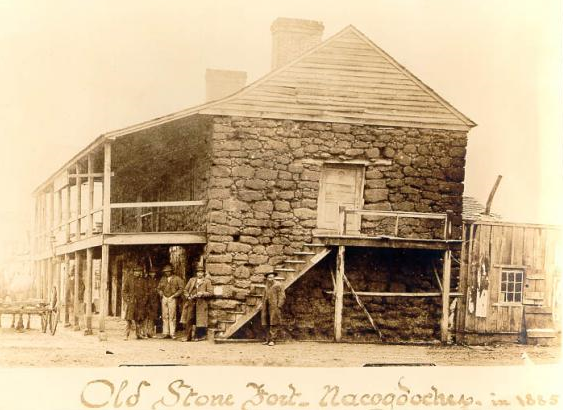
Old Stone Fort, Nacogdoches, Texas (photograph, circa 1885)

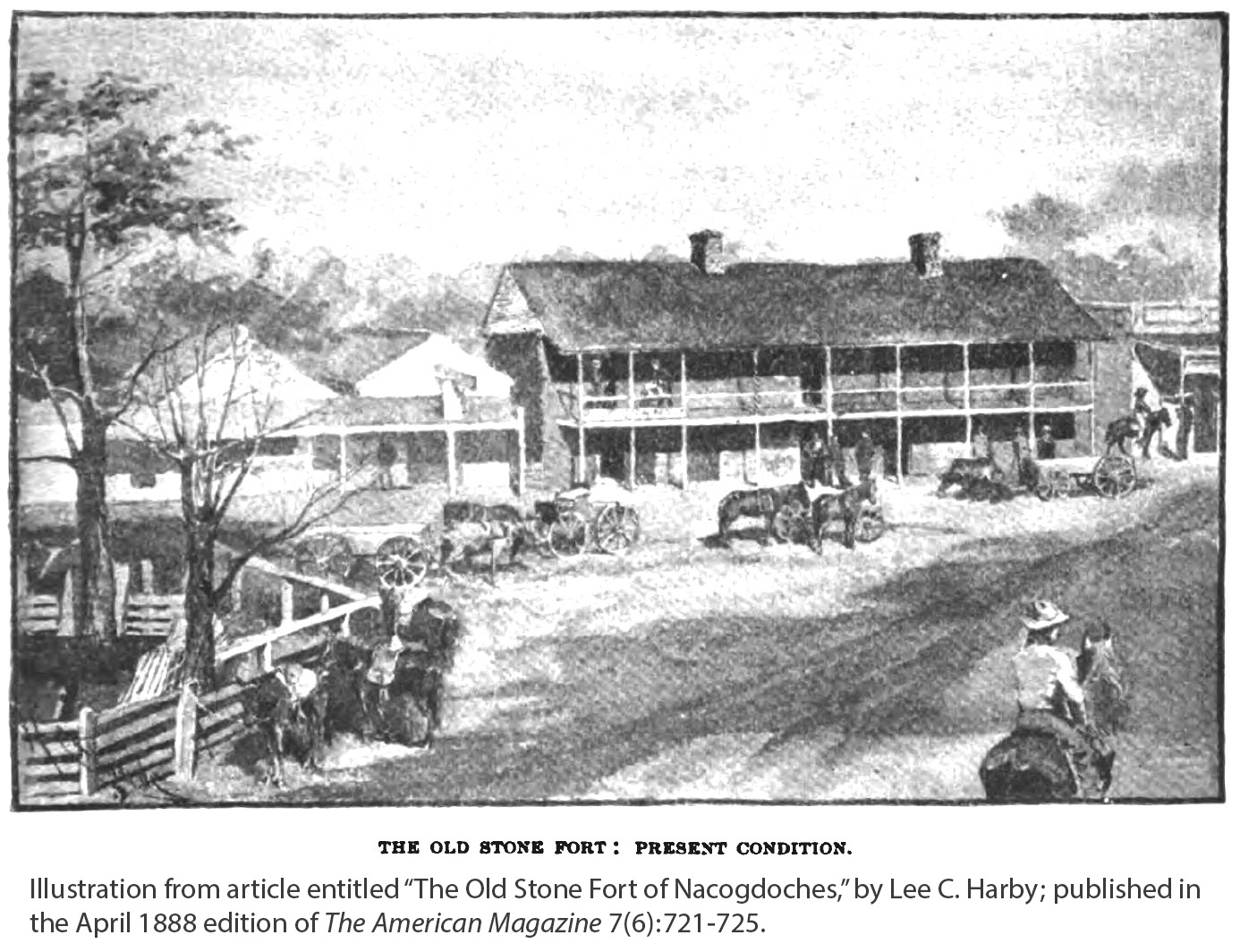
Illustration from an article entitled "The Old Stone Fort of Nacogdoches," by Lee C. Harby, published in the April 1888 edition of The American Magazine on page 721

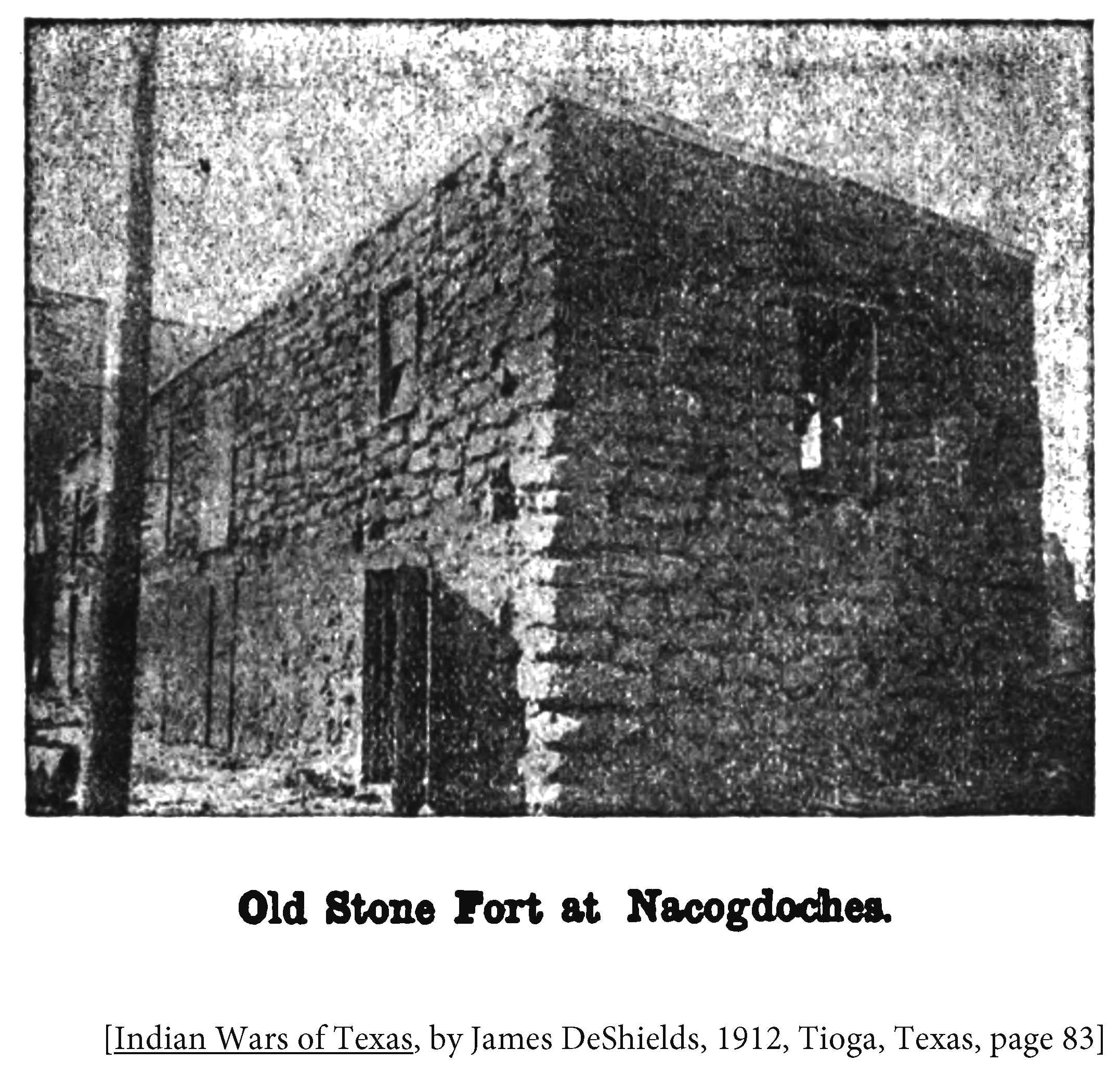
Old Stone Fort, Nacogdoches, Texas (photograph, circa 1912)

== See also ==
- List of museums in East Texas
- Millard's Crossing Historic Village
- Sterne-Hoya House Museum and Library
- Nacogdoches
- Old Three Hundred
- Recorded Texas Historic Landmarks in Nacogdoches County
