= Nacogdoches (disambiguation) =

Nacogdoches is a town in Texas.

Nacogdoches may also refer to:

- Nacogdoches County, Texas
- The Nacogdoche, a Native American tribe
- Nacogdoches (album), a 2004 album by Willie Nelson
