= John Marie Durst =

American settler (1797–1851)

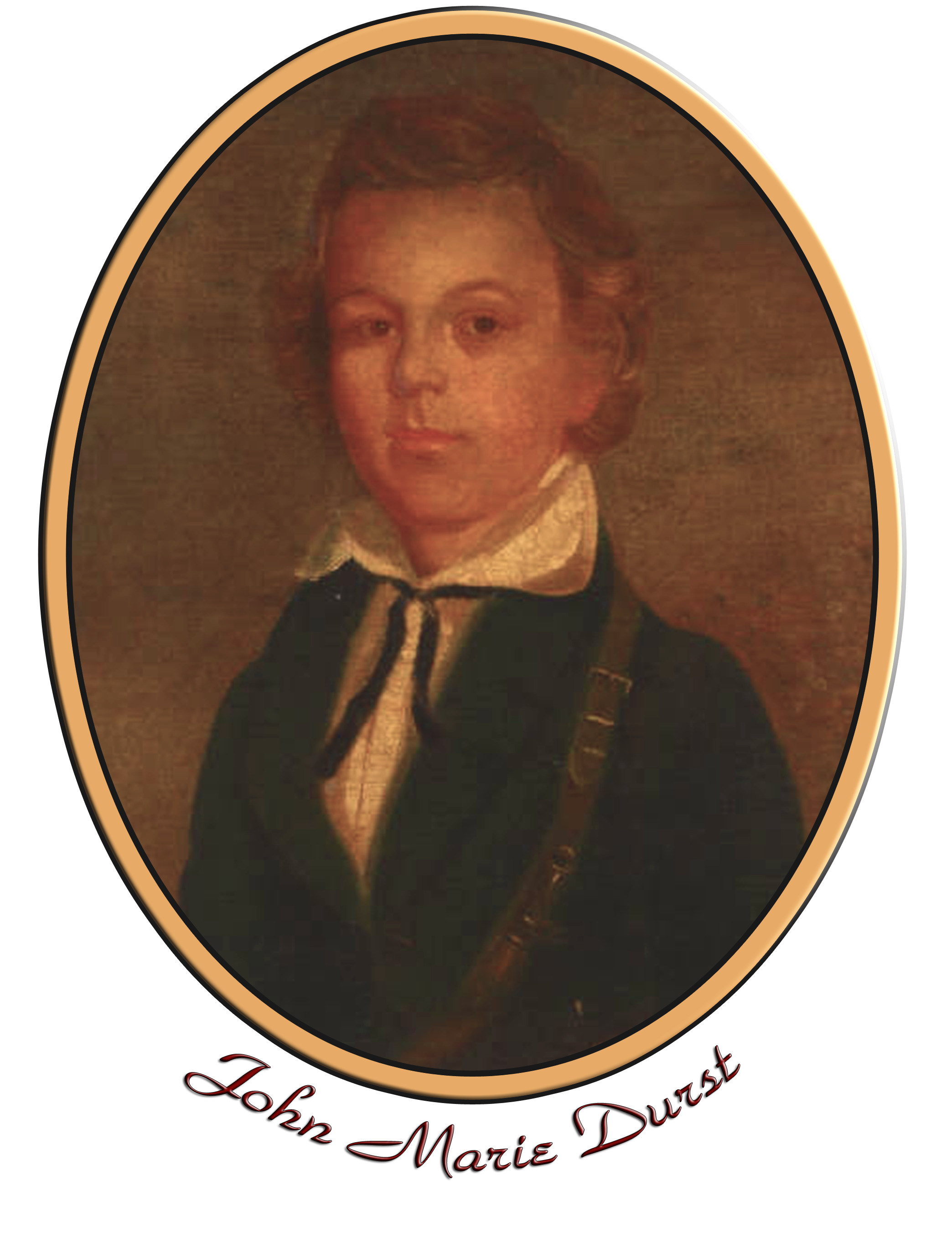
- John Marie Durst oil painting c1806
- Born: John Marie Durst; February 4, 1797; Arkansas Post
- Died: February 9, 1851 (aged 54); Galveston, Texas
- Resting place: Durst Cemetery; Leon County, Texas; 31°09′35″N 95°56′36″W
- Spouse: Harriet Matilda Jamison Durst
- Children: 10

John Marie Durst (1797–1851) was born on the frontier in Arkansas, and was an early American settler, military veteran, and politician in Louisiana and Texas. As a youth, he learned the mercantile trade from his godfather Peter Samuel Davenport in Texas, where he also became fluent in several languages. French, Spanish and various Native American languages were spoken in this region in addition to English, reflecting its different colonial history. At the age of 18, Durst fought in the Battle of New Orleans with a Louisiana militia.

He was a legislative representative under Coahuila y Tejas, during which he became involved in a land speculation controversy. Durst became a large land holder, due in part to an inheritance from Davenport. Because he rode in 1835 to warn settlers of Mexican troop movements, when Texas was seeking independence, he is sometimes called the Paul Revere of Texas. Durst also served with the Republic of Texas militia under Major General Thomas J. Rusk in actions against the Kickapoo and Cherokee peoples in the region. He founded the settlement of Mount Sterling, Texas in Nacogdoches County after the Republic of Texas gained independence.

== Early life ==
John Marie Durst was born in Arkansas Post on February 4, 1797. He was one of eight children, four boys and four girls, born to Jacob and Anna Agnes (Schesser) Durst. His brother Isaac was also given the first name of John, which was a custom among many ethnic Germans. His father Jacob was born in Shenandoah County, Virginia in 1754 as the first generation in North America. Jacob's father Abraham Derst had spelled the family name with an "e". Paternal grandfather Abraham Derst was born in Worms-Pfeddersheim, Germany in 1725, and was the immigrant ancestor to Virginia. Abraham's own father, Abraham Jacob Derst, was born and died in Germany. When John Marie was two years old, his mother died.

In 1803 the widower Jacob Durst moved the entire family to Natchitoches, Louisiana. That year the region and much more former French territory west of the Mississippi River was acquired by the United States in the Louisiana Purchase.

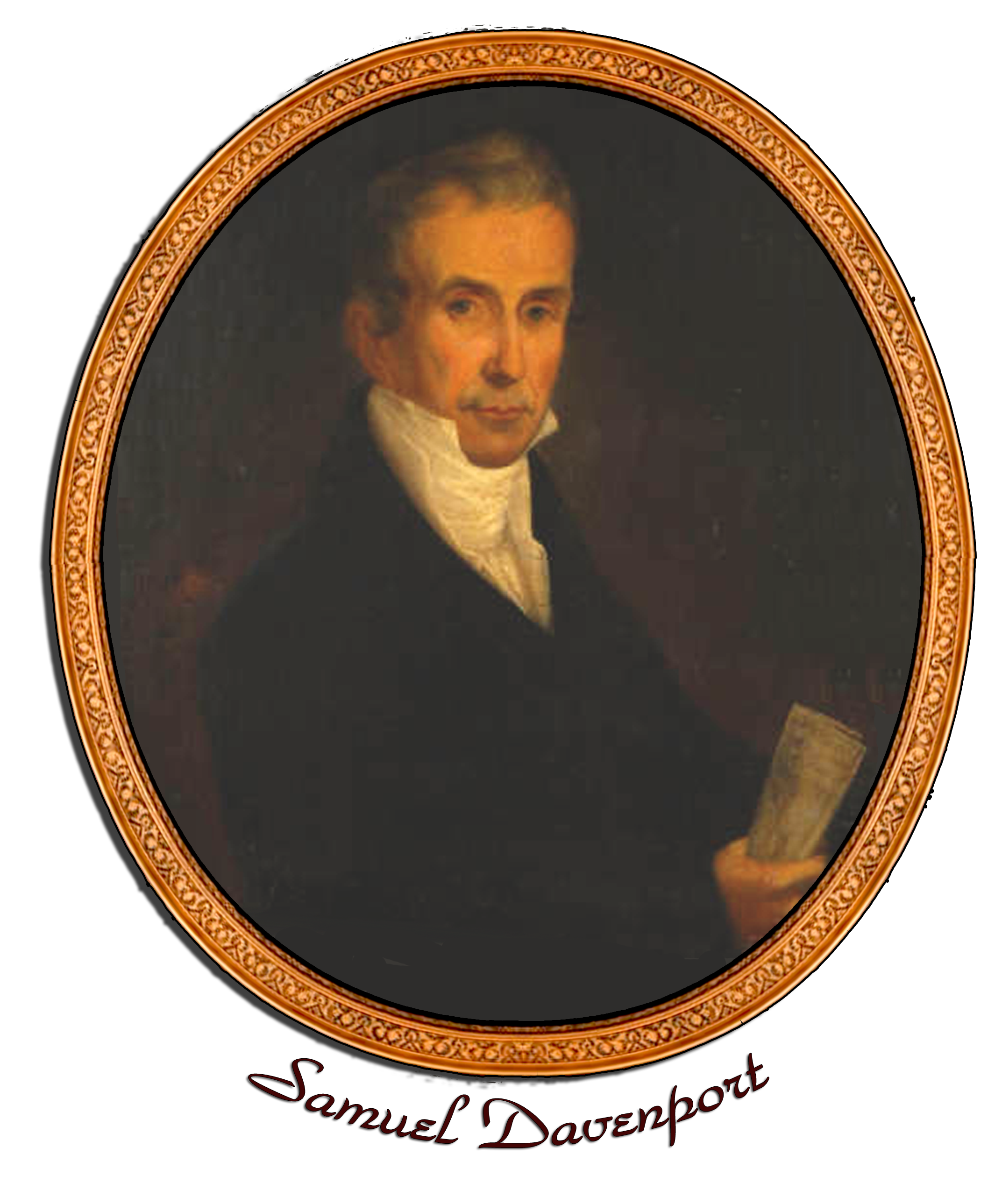

== Move to Texas ==
In 1806, Jacob Durst moved to Nacogdoches, Texas, then part of Spanish Mexico, with son John Marie and two of his older brothers. After Jacob died in 1814, local merchant Peter Samuel Davenport, known to friends as Samuel, became Durst's godfather and legal guardian. His two older brothers had already reached adulthood and were making their way.

Nacogdoches merchants William Barr, Luther Smith, Edward Murphy, and Davenport had established the mercantile House of Barr and Davenport in 1798. During Spanish Texas, the distribution center was an importer and exporter of merchandise between Louisiana and Texas, serving both the Spanish troops and the area Indian tribes.

Under Davenport's guardianship, the young Durst learned the mercantile trade and became fluent in several languages, including those of Indian tribes among whom the House of Barr and Davenport maintained resident traders. When the Gutiérrez-Magee Expedition captured Nacogdoches on August 12, 1812, Davenport became the quartermaster for the filibuster, supplying both arms and materiel, as well as rallying volunteers to join the cause. With the expedition defeated the next year, the Spanish government offered a reward for Davenport's capture.

Davenport fled with 16-year-old Durst to Natchitoches, Louisiana. On January 8, 1815, Durst fought in the Battle of New Orleans, as part of the Louisiana militia, second division. Afterward, Durst returned to Natchitoches.

== Land owner ==
Davenport died in 1824. He bequeathed 10,000 acres (40.47 km^{2}; 15.63 sq mi) acres in Louisiana to Durst. Davenport's son Juan Benigno swapped Durst the Louisiana acreage for acreage on the west side of the Sabine River in Texas. Part of the property included the Old Stone Fort in Nacogdoches, which Durst owned until 1834. That year he sold it to Juan Mora and Vicente Córdova.

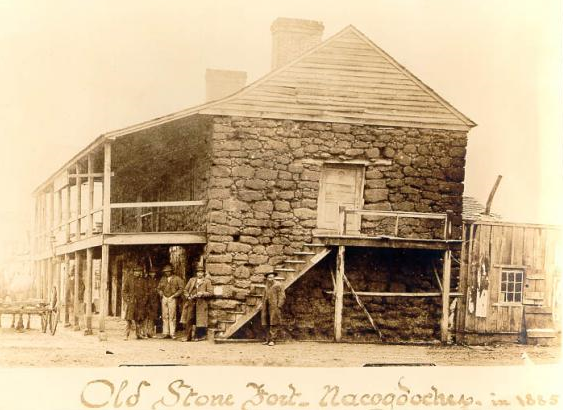
Old Stone Fort, Nacogdoches, Texas (photo, circa 1885).

The land transactions took time to complete. As a result of his swap with Benigno, in April 1834 Durst received a Mexican land grant for five leagues, which was surveyed in three separate tracts in Houston, Nacogdoches and Anderson counties. Durst had originally petitioned for land to be located on the eastern margin of the Trinity River. He was likely trying to recover the Barr Rancho, a large tract lost by his adoptive father Samuel Davenport. [Durst was the successor to the landholdings of the only official Indian trading establishment licensed by the Spanish government in the Province of Texas, known as the House of Barr and Davenport]. Davenport's lands had been confiscated by the government in 1813 due to Davenport's participation in the Gutiérrez-Magee Expedition.

But the Alcalde of Nacogdoches, Juan Maria Mora, said that available lands on the east bank of the river were limited to those "two leagues below [downriver from] the Old Presidio [Trinidad de Salcedo] and two leagues above [upriver from] the same."

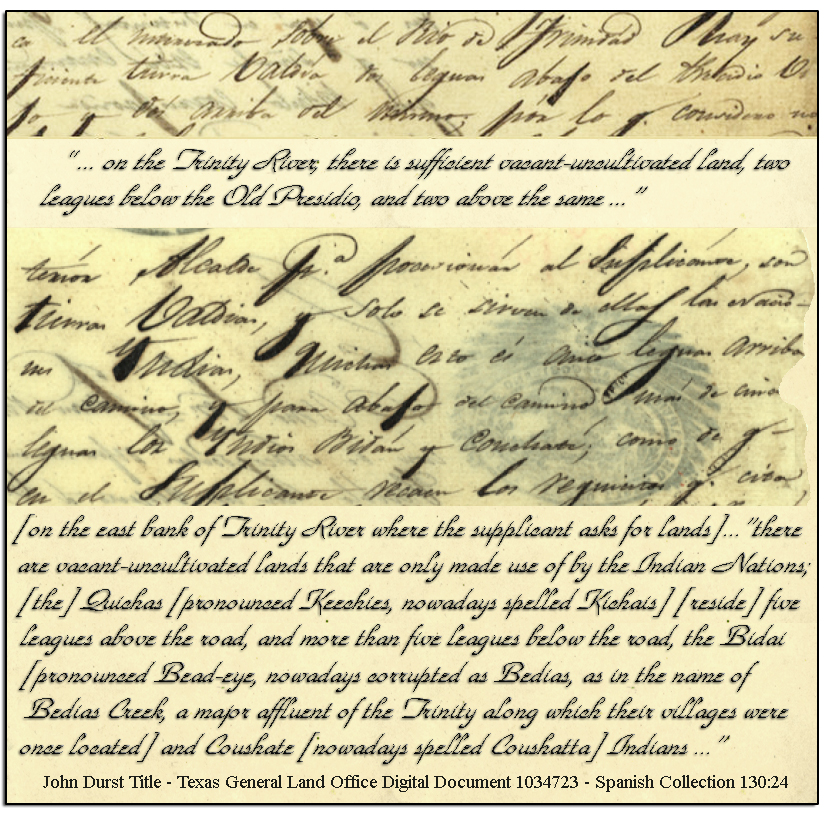

Durst chose a tract "above" the former location of Trinidad de Salcedo. It was on both sides of the road to Bexar [Old San Antonio Road] and surveyed out to three leagues, plus 18 labors. The fieldnotes of this survey stipulated that the northern corner should fall on the Arroyo de las Ruinas [Ruins Creek]. This was likely known for the ruins of the old Barr Rancho headquarters, burnt by order of Col. Ignacio Elizondo of the Spanish Royal Army, during his operations in the aftermath of the Gutierrez-Magee Expedition and the rout of insurgents at the Battle of Medina on 18 August 1813.

== Province of Coahuila y Tejas ==
After Mexico gained independence from Spain, from 1829 to 1834 Durst served in many capacities as an interpreter. He also became active in local politics. In 1835, Durst became a legislative representative of Coahuila y Tejas from Nacogdoches. He became involved in a controversy over land speculation.

While at the legislature, Durst learned of Mexican troop movement into Texas, and became known as the Paul Revere of Texas for his ride warning American settlers of the troop movement.

== Republic of Texas ==
Texas achieved independence in 1836. The following year, in 1837 Durst founded the town of Mount Sterling in Nacogdoches County.

In 1838, Durst was commissioned as a captain in the Republic of Texas militia, serving under Major General Thomas J. Rusk. Rusk was campaigning against the Kickapoo and Cherokee tribes of the area. In 1844, Durst moved with his family to Leon County.

== Personal life and death ==
Durst married Harriet Matilda Jamison on February 15, 1821. The young John Henninger Reagan, at the time a deputy surveyor, also served as a private tutor in the 1830s to the Durst children. Planters usually hired private tutors to educate their children.

John Marie Durst died in Galveston on February 9, 1851. He is buried in the family cemetery established on his property in Leon County. His wife Harriet died September 23, 1885, and is buried next to him.
