= Sterne–Hoya House Museum and Library =

Historic house in Texas, United States

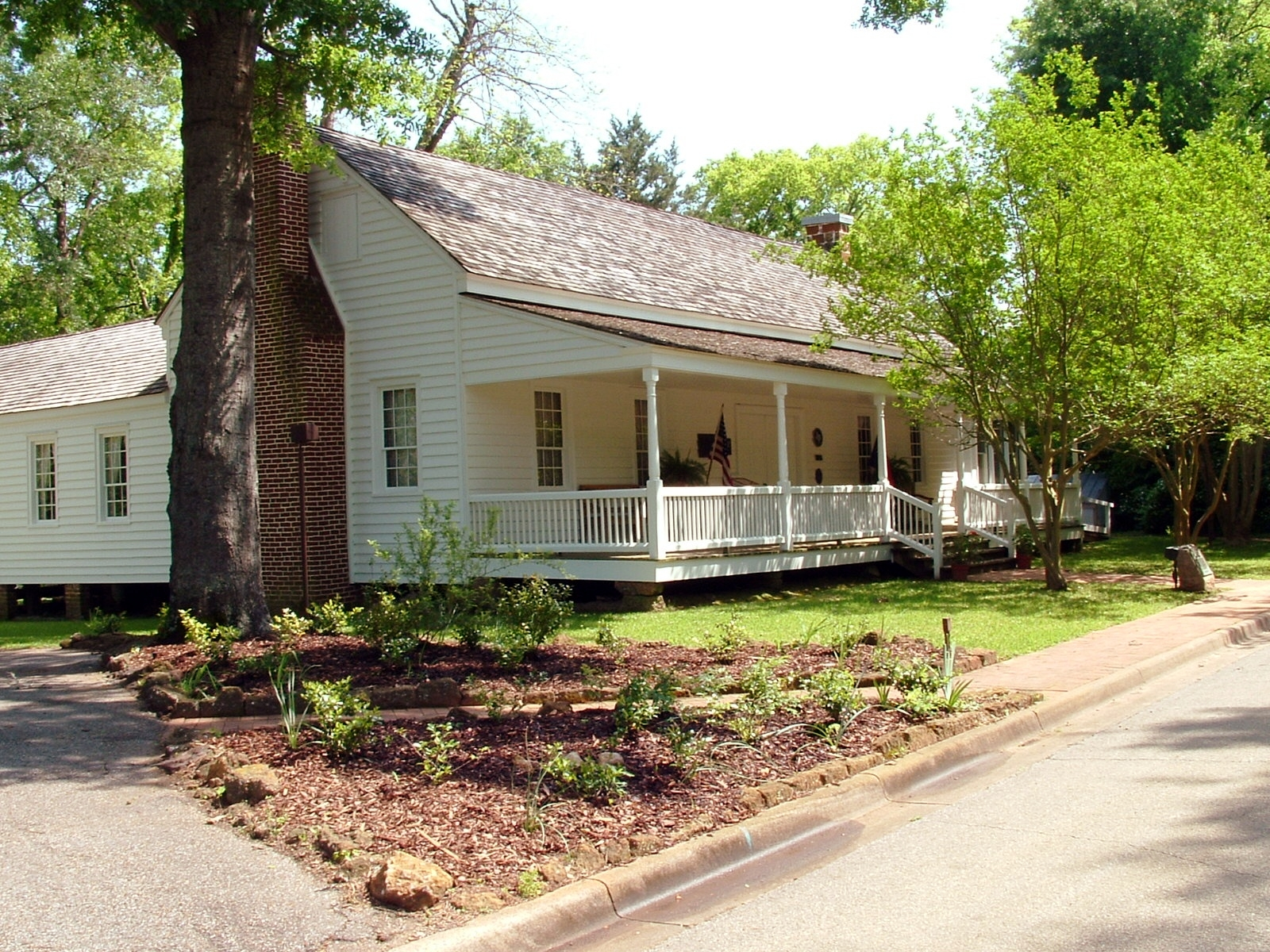
- Sterne–Hoya House Museum and Library

- Sterne–Hoya House Museum and Library mapframe = yes (the United States)
- Location: 211 S. Lanana St. Nacogdoches, Texas
- Coordinates: 31°36′03″N 94°39′03″W
- Website: Sterne–Hoya House Museum and Library
- Adolphus Sterne House
- U.S. National Register of Historic Places
- U.S. Historic district – Contributing property
- Texas State Antiquities Landmark
- Recorded Texas Historic Landmark
- Area: 1 acre (0.40 ha)
- Built: 1830
- Part of: Sterne-Hoya Historic District (ID92000017)
- NRHP reference No.: 76002053
- TSAL No.: 8200000485
- RTHL No.: 14549

Significant dates
- Added to NRHP: November 13, 1976
- Designated CP: February 14, 1992
- Designated TSAL: January 1, 1981
- Designated RTHL: 1977

The Sterne–Hoya House Museum and Library is located at 211 S. Lanana, in the city and county of Nacogdoches, in the U.S. state of Texas. It is on the National Register of Historic Places listings in Nacogdoches County and is a Recorded Texas Historic Landmark. Davy Crockett was a guest in the house, and Sam Houston was baptized in the house.

== History ==
Adolphus Sterne was an immigrant from Cologne, Germany. During a sojourn through Tennessee, he became friends with Sam Houston. He moved to Nacogdoches in 1826. Sterne became a munitions smuggler during the Fredonian Rebellion. He was a financier of the Texas Revolution. When Texas became a state, Sterne served in both houses of the legislature. In 1830, he built the house at 211 S. Lanana. Davy Crockett was a guest in the house for two weeks of 1835. Sam Houston was baptized into the Catholic faith in the parlor of this house, thereby meeting the requirements of the Mexican government to settle in Coahuila y Tejas and own property.

The house is a 1 1/2-story wood-frame construction on a brick pier foundation. A Victorian porch serves as the entrance. On the same lot, to the rear of the main house, is the servants quarters. Sterne also built a stable, smoke house, hen house and corn crib on the property, but they are no longer there. Sterne made modifications and repairs in the two decades following the home's original construction.

Charles Hoya was a county surveyor in Nacogdoches, operating the Hoya Land Office Building on the downtown square. His father Joseph T. Von der Hoya was a Prussian immigrant. Hoya, his wife Frances, and his father lived in the house at 211 S. Lanana, which the Hoya family purchased in 1866.

== Museum ==
The house was listed on the National Register of Historic Places listings in Nacogdoches County in 1976, and became a Recorded Texas Historic Landmark in 1977. The museum and library house many local historic artifacts donated by the Hoyas.

=== Hours, admission ===
Admission is free. The museum is open 10 a.m. to 4 p.m., Wednesday through Saturday. Tour groups need to book in advance.

== See also ==
- List of museums in East Texas
- Millard's Crossing Historic Village
- Old Stone Fort Museum
- National Register of Historic Places listings in Texas
- Recorded Texas Historic Landmarks in Nacogdoches County
