= National Register of Historic Places listings in Nacogdoches County, Texas =

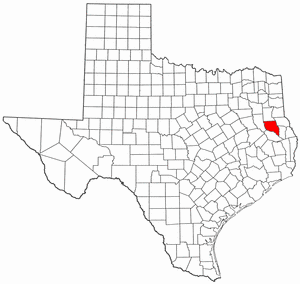
Location of Nacogdoches County in Texas

This is a list of the National Register of Historic Places listings in Nacogdoches County, Texas.

This is intended to be a complete list of properties and districts listed on the National Register of Historic Places in Nacogdoches County, Texas. There are five districts and 18 individual properties listed on the National Register in the county. Seven individually listed properties are Recorded Texas Historic Landmarks including two that are also State Antiquities Landmarks while several more Recorded Texas Historic Landmarks are included in the various districts.

This National Park Service list is complete through NPS recent listings posted May 1, 2026.

== Current listings ==
The publicly disclosed locations of National Register properties and districts may be seen in a mapping service provided.

	Name on the Register	Image	Date listed	Location	City or town	Description
1	Tol Barret House	Tol Barret House	July 27, 1979 (#79002998)	S of Nacogdoches; 31°32′09″N 94°40′01″W	Nacogdoches	Recorded Texas Historic Landmark
2	Eugene H. Blount House	Eugene H. Blount House	February 14, 1992 (#92000014)	1801 North St. 31°37′07″N 94°39′11″W	Nacogdoches	Historic and Architectural Resources of Nacogdoches MPS
3	Stephen William and Mary Price Blount House	Stephen William and Mary Price Blount House	January 30, 1991 (#90002180)	310 N. Mound St. 31°36′19″N 94°39′02″W	Nacogdoches	Part of Washington Square Historic District
4	Maria A. Davidson Apartments	Maria A. Davidson Apartments	February 14, 1992 (#92000009)	214 S. Fredonia St. 31°36′06″N 94°39′18″W	Nacogdoches	Part of Nacogdoches Downtown Historic District; Historic and Architectural Resources of Nacogdoches MPS
5	Bernardo D'Ortolan Rancho Site	Bernardo D'Ortolan Rancho Site	November 26, 2014 (#14000101)	Address restricted	Nacogdoches	Historic Resources of El Camino Real de los Tejas National Historic Trail MPS
6	Raphael D'Ortolan Site	Raphael D'Ortolan Site	November 26, 2014 (#14000100)	Address restricted	Nacogdoches	Historic Resources of El Camino Real de los Tejas National Historic Trail MPS
7	Durst-Taylor House	Durst-Taylor House	August 21, 2003 (#03000808)	304 North St. 31°36′19″N 94°39′16″W	Nacogdoches	Recorded Texas Historic Landmark; part of Nacogdoches Downtown Historic District
8	Hayter Office Building	Hayter Office Building	February 14, 1992 (#92000010)	112 E. Main St. 31°36′11″N 94°39′19″W	Nacogdoches	Part of Nacogdoches Downtown Historic District; Historic and Architectural Resources of Nacogdoches MPS
9	Hoya Land Office Building	Hoya Land Office Building	February 14, 1992 (#92000015)	120 E. Pilar St. 31°36′08″N 94°39′21″W	Nacogdoches	Recorded Texas Historic Landmark; part of Nacogdoches Downtown Historic District; Historic and Architectural Resources of Nacogdoches MPS
10	Roland Jones House	Roland Jones House	February 14, 1992 (#92000007)	141 N. Church St. 31°36′13″N 94°39′10″W	Nacogdoches	Recorded Texas Historic Landmark; part of Nacogdoches Downtown Historic District; Historic and Architectural Resources of Nacogdoches MPS
11	Mangham-McIlwain Building		March 22, 2019 (#100003538)	10001 Appleby Sand Rd. 31°42′58″N 94°36′18″W	Nacogdoches	
12	Nacogdoches Downtown Historic District	Nacogdoches Downtown Historic District	May 29, 2008 (#08000478)	Roughly bounded by Southern Pacific RR tracks, Banita Cr., Pilar, Mound, Arnold, North & Hospital Sts., 31°36′18″N 94°39′20″W	Nacogdoches	Includes Recorded Texas Historic Landmarks
13	Oil Springs Oil Field Discovery Well		November 23, 1977 (#77001461)	4 mi (6.4 km). SE of Woden; 31°28′20″N 94°28′03″W	Woden	
14	Old Cotton Exchange Building	Old Cotton Exchange Building	February 14, 1992 (#92000008)	305 E. Commerce St. 31°36′12″N 94°39′13″W	Nacogdoches	Part of Nacogdoches Downtown Historic District; Historic and Architectural Resources of Nacogdoches MPS
15	Old Nacogdoches University Building	Old Nacogdoches University Building	June 21, 1971 (#71000956)	Washington Sq. 31°36′24″N 94°39′05″W	Nacogdoches	State Antiquities Landmark, Recorded Texas Historic Landmark; part of Washington Square Historic District
16	Old Post Office Building	Old Post Office Building	February 14, 1992 (#92000011)	206 E. Main St. 31°36′10″N 94°39′18″W	Nacogdoches	Recorded Texas Historic Landmark; part of Nacogdoches Downtown Historic District; Historic and Architectural Resources of Nacogdoches MPS
17	Roberts Building	Roberts Building	February 14, 1992 (#92000016)	216 E. Pilar St. 31°36′07″N 94°39′17″W	Nacogdoches	Part of Nacogdoches Downtown Historic District; Historic and Architectural Resources of Nacogdoches MPS
18	Southern Pacific Railroad Depot	Southern Pacific Railroad Depot	February 14, 1992 (#92000013)	500 W. Main St. 31°36′18″N 94°39′32″W	Nacogdoches	Part of Nacogdoches Downtown Historic District; Historic and Architectural Resources of Nacogdoches MPS
19	Adolphus Sterne House	Adolphus Sterne House	November 13, 1976 (#76002053)	211 S. Lanana St. 31°36′00″N 94°39′02″W	Nacogdoches	State Antiquities Landmark, Recorded Texas Historic Landmark; part of Sterne-Hoya Historic District
20	Sterne-Hoya Historic District	Sterne-Hoya Historic District	February 14, 1992 (#92000017)	100-200 blocks of S. Lanana St., 500 block of E. Main St. (S side), 500 block of E. Pilar St. 31°36′02″N 94°39′04″W	Nacogdoches	Includes State Antiquities Landmark, Recorded Texas Historic Landmark; Historic and Architectural Resources of Nacogdoches MPS
21	Virginia Avenue Historic District	Virginia Avenue Historic District	February 14, 1992 (#92000018)	500 block of Bremond (W side), 500-1800 blocks of Virginia Ave., 521 Weaver; 31°35′58″N 94°39′38″W	Nacogdoches	Includes Recorded Texas Historic Landmark; Historic and Architectural Resources of Nacogdoches MPS
22	Washington Square Historic District	Washington Square Historic District	February 14, 1992 (#92000019)	Roughly bounded by Houston, Logansport, N. Lanana, E. Hospital and N. Fredonia Sts. 31°36′26″N 94°38′59″W	Nacogdoches	Includes State Antiquities Landmark, Recorded Texas Historic Landmark; Historic and Architectural Resources of Nacogdoches MPS
23	Woodmen of the World Building	Woodmen of the World Building	February 14, 1992 (#92000012)	412 E. Main St. 31°36′08″N 94°39′13″W	Nacogdoches	Part of Nacogdoches Downtown Historic District; Historic and Architectural Resources of Nacogdoches MPS
24	Zion Hill Historic District	Zion Hill Historic District	January 7, 1993 (#92001759)	Roughly bounded by Park St., Lanana Cr., Oak Grove Cemetery and N. Lanana St. 31°36′20″N 94°38′50″W	Nacogdoches	Includes Recorded Texas Historic Landmark; Historic and Architectural Resources of Nacogdoches MPS

== See also ==
- National Register of Historic Places listings in Texas
- Recorded Texas Historic Landmarks in Nacogdoches County
