= Benjamin W. Edwards =

American colonist and Fredonian Rebellion leader (1780–1837)

Benjamin W. Edwards (c. 1780 – 1837) was an American colonist in early Texas, and the leader of the Fredonian Rebellion. In the 1837 Mississippi gubernatorial election, he ran as a candidate for governor of Mississippi, but died during the campaign. He was the brother of Haden Edwards. They both were the leaders of the Fredonian Rebellion in 1827.
