= Millard's Crossing Historic Village =

- Location within Texas
- Location: 6020 North Street; Nacogdoches, Texas
- Coordinates: 31.659955°N 94.658381°W
- Website: Millard's Crossing Historic Village

The Millard's Crossing Historic Village is located at 6020 North Street, in the city and county of Nacogdoches, in the U.S. state of Texas. It is a Recorded Texas Historic Landmark.

== History ==
Millard's Crossing Historic Village is a 37-acre (14.97 ha; 0.06 sq mi) living history site established by Lera Millard Thomas in the 1970s. The Village sits on land which belonged to the Millard family, and on which Thomas grew up. The Village began in 1966 as a project restoration of a singular Victorian house by Thomas, who was the widow of Congressman Albert Thomas. From that one house, Thomas began restoring other structures of East Texas architecture. The Village borders on a railroad track, and is home to a restored red train caboose. There are also log cabins and other restored Victorian architecture in the Village. Of note on the property is the Millard-Lee House which Thomas restored. The house is a Recorded Texas Historic Landmark, and was built c.1837 by Robert G. Millard. The house was purchased by David Lee in 1859.

== See also ==
- List of museums in East Texas
- Old Stone Fort Museum
- Sterne-Hoya House Museum and Library
