= Antonio Gil Y'Barbo =

Spanish military personnel (1729–1809)

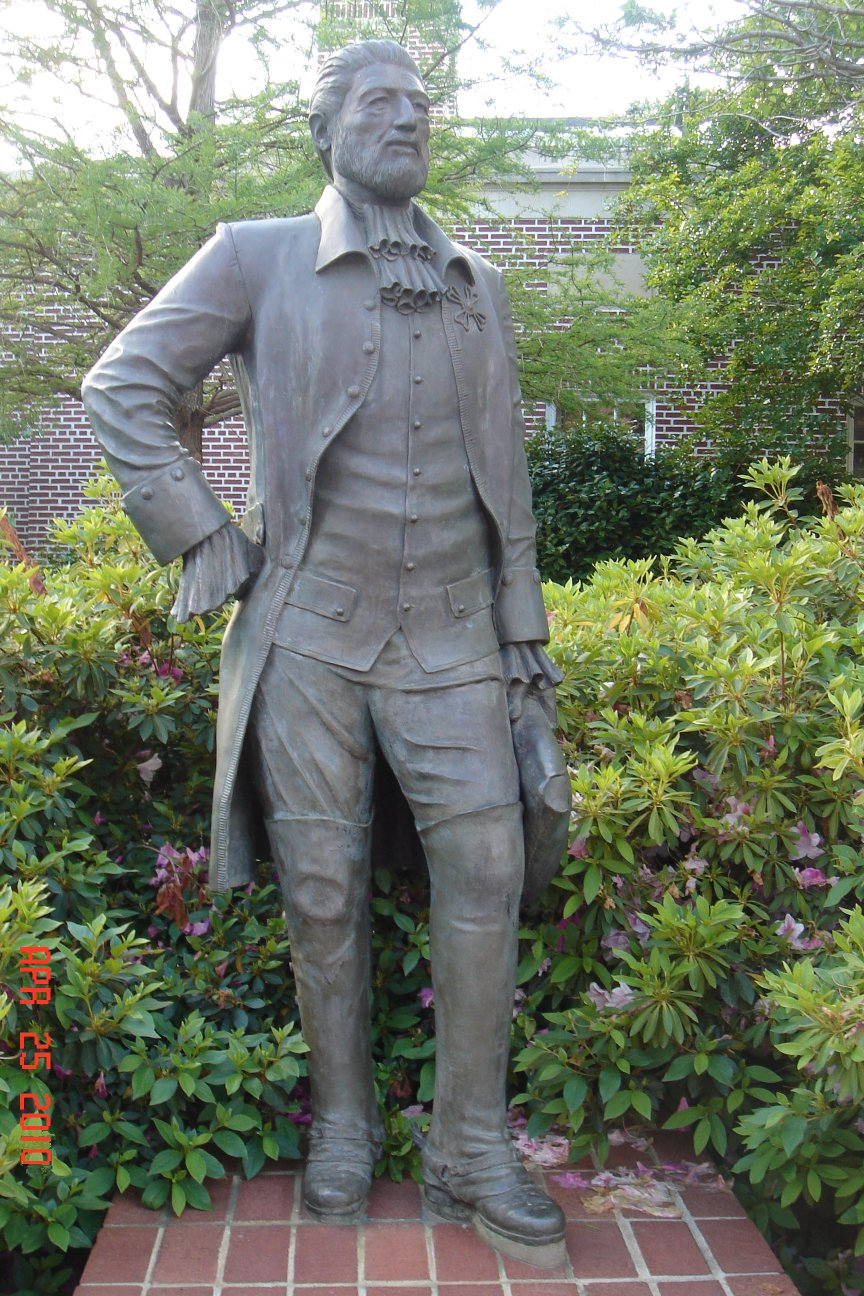
Statue of Antonio Gil y Barbo, Plaza Principal, Nacogdoches, erected in 1997

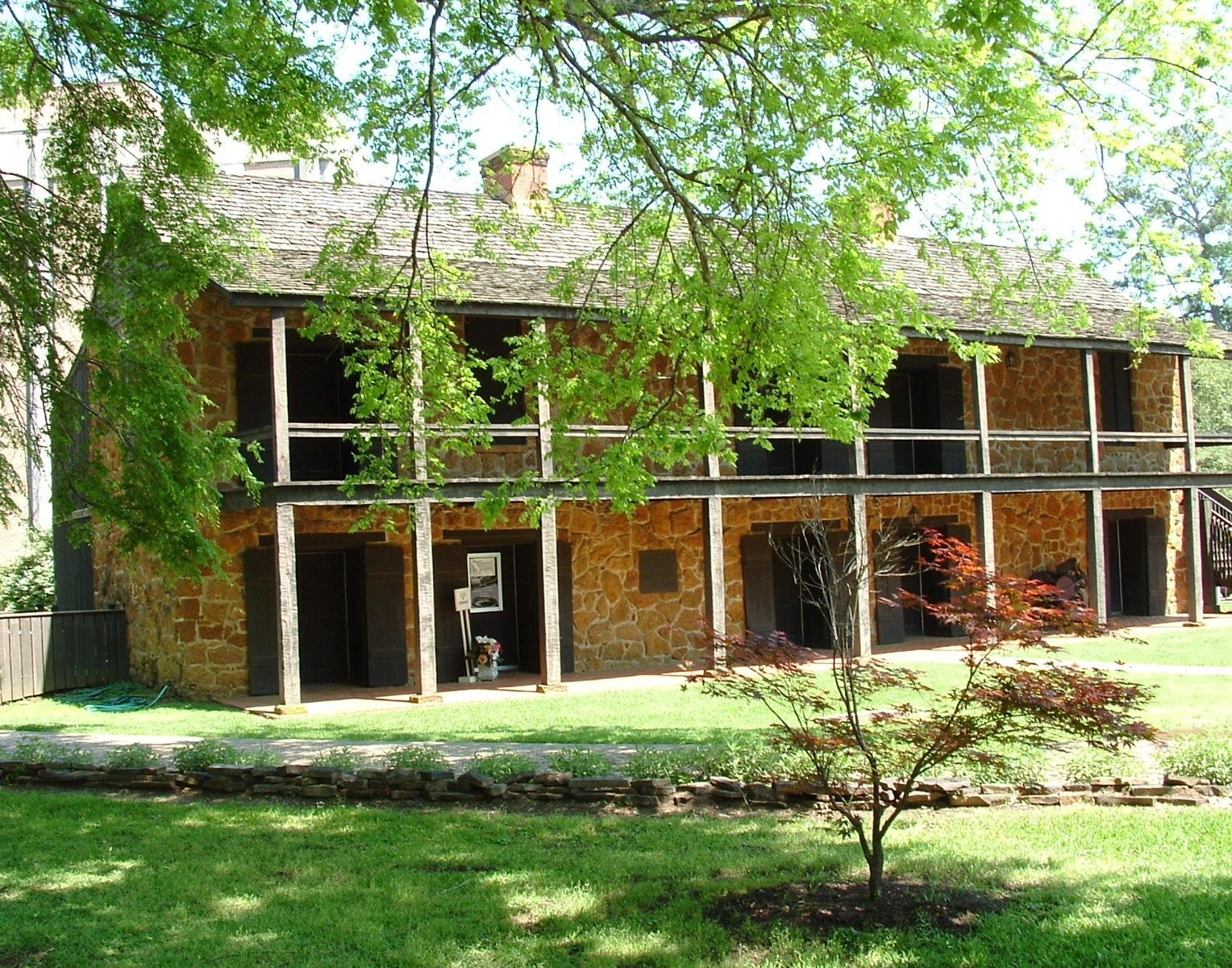
The Old Stone Fort, built by Gil Ybarbo about 1790, and later reconstructed.

Antonio Gil Ybarbo (1729–1809), also known as Gil Ybarbo or Gil Ibarbo, was a military officer in the Spanish Empire and trader in Spanish Texas, who played a crucial role in the development of Nacogdoches, Texas in 1779.

== Biography ==
=== Early years: Nuestra Señora del Pilar de Los Adaes ===
Antonio Gil Ybarbo was born in 1729 at the presidio of Los Adaes, former capital of Spanish Texas (current day in Louisiana). His father was attached to the military garrison of the presidio, Matheo Antonio y'Barbo, born in 1698 in Seville, Spain, and his mother Juana Luzgarda Hernandez, also born in Seville in 1705. Los Adaes was located at the far eastern reaches of the Spanish province to prevent French expansion from French Louisiana. Antonio became part of the military garrison too while he was also employed in cattle ranching, establishing a ranch near Lobanillo Creek (present day Sabine County, Texas). Also at some point he married Maria Padilla, his first wife, and established a home at the Rancho Lobanillo.

The prosperous Viceroyalty of New Spain relied on monopolistic trade to support its American territories (which included a myriad of cities, villas, missions, presidios and ranchos, stunning cathedrals and efficient court houses) and on the extensive Spanish empire trade routes which stretched from Italian regions under Spanish rule to the Philippines. However, Los Adaes was always on the spotlight of French interests who used smuggling to undermine the economy of this eastern Texas region. Goods (farm equipment or basic goods) from French Natchitoches (13 miles to the east) where overwhelmingly traded in Los Adaes while local officials looked the other way. The fact that weapons and gunpowder where sold too to the natives was alarming, because either they ended on the enemies of the Spanish allied natives or ended on the Spanish allies to turn them against the Spanish.

=== 1763: Louisiana under Spanish rule and Texas capital moved to San Antonio ===
After the French defeat in the Seven Years' War, Spain ruled Spanish Luisiana. This made the Los Adaes outpost superfluous and the capital was moved west to San Antonio de Bexar, along with its garrison and civil neighbours by that time numbering around 500. Furthermore, in 1773 the III marquis of Rubi ordered the closing of the presidios and missions of East Texas.

Antonio Gil y Barbo, the de facto leader of the Adaeseños in San Antonio was soon determined to obtain permission and official backing to move back to his homeland. The first efforts before governor Hugo O'Conor failed because of fears of contraband trade with the English and Indian access to contraband firearms and powder if a new settlement was allowed on the former frontier.

Eventually, Y'Barbo and Gil Flores traveled to Mexico City to lodge a personal entreaty with the viceroy, Antonio Maria de Bucareli y Ursúa. (It is a testament to their relationship with the native people of the area that a chief of the Tejas Caddo (el jefe Texito) made the trip with them to join the plea.) Surprisingly, the Viceroy relented, not only consenting to their returning as far as Los Ais, a settlement and mission near present-day San Augustine and one even closer to El Lobanillo than Los Adaes, but gaining ratification from a junta de guerra y hacienda called to consider the matter.

At this point O'Conor intervened. In scathing letters to the Baron de Ripperdá, governor of Texas, and the Viceroy, he condemned the entire plan. Citing the illegal trade in arms and ammunition known to have existed between the Adaeseños, the French and the northern tribes, he charged that Gil Y'Barbo actually schemed to re-enter that illegal commerce. As a result, the earlier decision to approve was rescinded pending reconsideration. Partly because of O'Conor's preoccupation with Apache matters, the decision was ultimately left to Bucareli, who authorized Ripperdá to assist their move to "a suitable place" in the east, but to a location no closer than 100 leagues from Nachitoches. Thus, a compromise was reached and they were permitted, in 1774, to move as far east as Paso Tómas on the Trinity River where they established the new colony of Nuestra Señora del Pilar de Bucareli. Named for the Viceroy, Antonio Maria de Bucareli y Ursúa, the new settlement would prove temporary, however.

=== 1774: founding of Nuestra Señora del Pilar de Bucareli ===
To Viceroy Bucareli, the new site on the Trinity had appeared a reasonable location for a new outpost. It provided a way-station between Bexar and the then-Spanish presidio at Nachitoches, it would provide a base for relations with friendly Bidais Indians in the area (who would presumably shield the settlers from the unfriendly Comanches) and it would serve as a check-point against illicit trade. Potentially, it was also seen as a foil against British free-booting from the upper coastal bend of Texas, a factor that loomed as Spain's alignment with the American cause against Britain developed.

For a while it seemed to work. Relations with the local Indians were indeed improved, and in spite of the small contingent at Bucareli, Y'Barbo and his men were able to reconnoiter as far south as the coast, having some success in managing, or at least reporting, stray British ventures into the area.

Unfortunately, all that recommended Bucareli came to naught when, in 1777, the ranging Comanche discovered the little villa. Shortly thereafter, as was their stock-in-trade, they began periodic raids, stealing horses, stealing cattle and, in some cases, leaving Adaeseños dead or wounded. Making matters worse, the village, set as it was on the alluvial plain of the Trinity River, was subject to sporadic inundations and in December 1778 the community was struck by a particularly damaging flood.

By January 1779, many of the settlers had decided that Bucareli would have to be abandoned.

=== 1779: settlement at Nuestra Señora de Guadalupe de los Nacogdoches. ===
After five years, plagued by flood and increasing depredation from an expanding Comanche nation, the community pulled up stakes in early 1779 and, with no prior authority, moved back to the former Spanish mission at present-day Nacogdoches. There, at least, there was some greater security among the Nacogdoche, Nasoni and other Caddoan allies of eastern Texas, although the Nacogdoches area was not totally immune from the Comanche surge.

As noted, the location chosen by Gil y Barbo and his band had previously been occupied by a Spanish mission, Nuestra Señora de Guadalupe de los Nacogdoches. However, by the 1770s that mission was among the several abandoned when Los Adaes was no longer needed to monitor possible incursions from the French-controlled territory of Louisiana.

Fortunately, the colonial administration was neither unaware of, nor unsympathetic to, the dire conditions at Bucareli. Apparently recognizing the move as a matter of survival, officials had within months not only granted approval for the new settlement, but had appointed Gil y Barbo to be Lieutenant-Governor of Nacogdoches, Captain of Militia, Judge of Contraband Seizures and Indian agent for the new district. With this promotion and these new responsibilities (he had been Captain of the Bucareli post) came the not inconsiderable salary of 500 pesos per year.

Thus, as part of the overall Spanish efforts to enforce Royal sanctions against free trade and maintain relations with established Indian allies, the Spanish colonial government granted Gil Y'Barbo the authority to establish, operate and govern a permanent pueblo on the eastern reaches of the El Camino Real de los Tejas, a trail, really, that spanned virtually the entire Spanish province of Texas. Unlike the ill-fated Bucareli, that settlement, Pueblo Nuestra Señora del Pilar de Nacogdoches, was, indeed, permanent and survives today as the modern City of Nacogdoches, Texas.

Gil y Barbo used diplomatic skill to move his band of 350 pioneers northeast from San Antonio to Bucareli; it could be argued he used initiative to lead them from Bucareli to Nacogdoches. There, the pilgrims built a thriving trading post, trading in all manner of goods, but the residents, as they had been at Los Adaes, were still under the restrictions of the archaic mercantilism of the Monarchy. This meant the new settlement had to rely patiently on Mexico City for basic goods or flout the law. As it had been at Los Adaes, much of the trade that took place was illegal.

=== The Old Stone Fort ===
As was Spanish custom, the pueblo was laid out with a central plaza around which commercial and public life took place. Later, as a result of his success in trading cattle, horses, deerskins and other commodities, Gil y'Barbo was able to construct, in 1788–1791, a two-story stone building located on the northeast corner of the plaza. La Casa de Piedra, the Spanish for "Stone House" as it was known, served principally as a trading post —the most important from Texas to Louisiana— but when needed, could also be pressed into service as a jail or a defensive position. Still later known as the Old Stone Fort it was at the time the largest building in the province. Constructed of iron ore found in the area and with interior walls made of ten-by-fourteen-inch adobe blocks, it was also the most substantial. Following more than a century of use and after passing through numerous owners, the Stone Fort was, in 1902, dismantled to make way for a structure more suitable for commerce. In 1936, a replica of the fortress, said to use the original stones, was erected on the campus of Stephen F. Austin University. The replica stands today as a museum focusing on the early years of the city and state.

Gil y Barbo died in 1809 at his ranch, La Lucana, located on the Attoyac Bayou, but is presumed to have been buried in the Old Spanish Cemetery, where the present Nacogdoches County Courthouse stands.

== Legacy ==
Described by the National Park Service as a "prolific trader and smuggler," Gil y'Barbo's contribution to Texas was essential to the well-being of "his people," and a critical element in providing a staging point for the Anglo-American settlers that would follow them.

The trek of 1779 was a major element in the decision by the U.S. Congress in 2004 to elevate the Old San Antonio Road into the status of a National Historic Trail. Since 1997, a statue of Gil y Barbo has greeted visitors to the Nacogdoches plaza laid out by the pioneer trader.
