= Fredonian Rebellion =

1826–27 secession attempt in Mexican Texas

- Approximate location of the Republic of Fredonia
Date	December 21, 1826 – January 31, 1827 (1 month, 1 week and 3 days)
Location	Nacogdoches
Result	Mexican victory

Belligerents
Mexico	Texian rebels

Commanders and leaders
Guadalupe Victoria; Stephen F. Austin	Haden Edwards (surrendered); Benjamin Edwards (surrendered); John Dulns Hunter †; Richard Fields †

Strength
375	Unknown

Casualties and losses
0	Unknown <4

The Fredonian Rebellion or Texan revolt of 1826 (December 21, 1826 – January 31, 1827) was the first attempt by Texans to secede from Mexico. The settlers, led by Empresario Haden Edwards, declared independence from Mexican Texas and created the Republic of Fredonia near Nacogdoches. The short-lived republic encompassed the land the Mexican government had granted to Edwards in 1825 and included areas that had been previously settled. Edwards's actions soon alienated the established residents, and the increasing hostilities between them and settlers recruited by Edwards led Víctor Blanco of the Mexican government to revoke Edwards's contract.

In late December 1826, a group of Edwards's supporters took control of the region by arresting and removing from office several municipality officials affiliated with the established residents. Supporters declared their independence from Mexico. Although the nearby Cherokee tribe initially signed a treaty to support the new republic because a prior agreement with the Mexican government negotiated by Chief Richard Fields was ignored, overtures from Mexican authorities and respected empresario, Stephen F. Austin, convinced tribal leaders to repudiate the rebellion. On January 31, 1827, a force of over 100 Mexican soldiers and 275 Texian Militia marched into Nacogdoches to restore order. Haden Edwards and his brother Benjamin Edwards fled to the United States. Chief Fields was killed by his own tribe. A local merchant was arrested and sentenced to death but later paroled.

The rebellion led Mexican president Guadalupe Victoria to increase the military presence in the area. As a result, several hostile tribes in the area halted their raids on settlements and agreed to a peace treaty. The Comanche abided by this treaty for many years. Fearing that, through the rebellion, the United States hoped to gain control of Texas, the Mexican government severely curtailed immigration to the region from the US. The new immigration law was bitterly opposed by colonists and caused increasing dissatisfaction with Mexican rule. Some historians consider the Fredonian Rebellion to be the beginning of the Texas Revolution. In the words of one historian, the rebellion was "premature, but it sparked the powder for later success".

== Background ==
After winning independence in 1821, several of Spain's colonies in the New World joined together to create a new country, Mexico. The country divided itself into several states, and the area known as Mexican Texas became part of the border state Coahuila y Tejas. To assist in governing the large area, the state created several departments; all of Texas was included in the Department of Béxar. The department was further subdivided into municipalities, which were each governed by an alcalde, similar to a modern-day mayor. A large portion of East Texas, ranging from the Sabine to the Trinity rivers and from the Gulf Coast to the Red River, became part of the municipality of Nacogdoches. Most residents of the municipality were Spanish-speaking families who had occupied their land for generations. An increasing number were English-speaking residents who had immigrated illegally during the Mexican War of Independence. Many of the immigrants were adventurers who had arrived as part of various military filibustering groups, which had attempted to create independent republics within Texas during Spanish rule. (Note: The most prominent of the filibustering groups were the Long Expedition and the Gutiérrez–Magee Expedition.)

For better control of the sparsely populated border region, in 1824 the Mexican federal government passed the General Colonization Law to allow legal immigration into Texas. Under the law, each state would set its own requirements for immigration. After some debate, on March 24, 1825, Coahuila y Tejas authorized a system granting land to empresarios, who would each recruit settlers for their particular colony. In addition, for every 100 families an empresario settled in Texas, they would receive 23,000 acres of land to cultivate and settle on. During the state government's deliberations, many would-be empresarios congregated in Mexico to lobby for land grants. Among them was Haden Edwards, an American land speculator known for his quick temper and aggressiveness. Despite his abrasiveness, Edwards was granted a colonization contract on April 14 allowing him to settle 800 families in East Texas. The contract contained standard language requiring Edwards to recognize all pre-existing Spanish and Mexican land titles in his grant area, to raise a militia to protect the settlers in the area and to allow the state land commissioner to certify all deeds awarded.

Edwards's colony encompassed the land from the Navasota River to 20 leagues west of the Sabine River, and from 20 leagues north of the Gulf of Mexico to 15 leagues north of the town of Nacogdoches. To the west and north of the colony were lands controlled by several Native tribes that had recently been driven out of the United States. The southern boundary was a colony overseen by Stephen F. Austin, the son of the first empresario in Texas. East of Edwards's grant was the former Sabine Free State, a neutral zone, which had been essentially lawless for several decades. The boundaries of the new colony and the municipality of Nacogdoches partially overlapped, leading to uncertainty over who had jurisdiction over which function. The majority of the established settlers lived outside the eastern boundary of the Edwards colony.

== Prelude ==
Edwards arrived in Nacogdoches in August 1825. Mistakenly believing that he had the authority to determine the validity of existing land claims, Edwards demanded written proof of ownership in September or the land would be forfeited and sold at auction. His action was at least partially driven by prejudice; Edwards scorned those who were poorer or of a different race. By removing less-prosperous settlers, he could assign their lands to wealthy planters, like himself, from the Southern United States.

Very few of the English-speaking residents had valid titles. Those who had not arrived as filibusters had been duped by fraudulent land speculators. Most of the Spanish-speaking landowners had lived on grants made to their families 70 or more years previously and were unable to produce any paperwork. Anticipating the potential conflict between the new empresario and the long-time residents of the area, the acting alcalde of the municipality, Luis Procela, and the municipality clerk, Jose Antonio Sepulveda, began validating old Spanish and Mexican land titles, a function legally assigned to the state land commissioner. In response, Edwards accused the men of forging deeds, further angering the residents.

By December 1825, Edwards had recruited 50 families to emigrate from the United States. As required under his contract, Edwards organized a Texian Militia company open to his colonists and established residents. When militia members elected Sepulveda as their captain, Edwards nullified the results and proclaimed himself head of the militia company. After that debacle, Edwards, acting outside his authority, called for elections for a new alcalde. Two men were nominated for the position—Edwards's son-in-law, Chichester Chaplin, seen as the representative for the newly-arrived immigrants, and Samuel Norris, an American who had married the daughter of a long-time resident and was sympathetic to the more-established landowners. After Chaplin's victory, many settlers alleged vote-stacking in an appeal to Juan Antonio Saucedo, the political chief of the Department of Béxar. In March, Saucedo overturned the election results and proclaimed Norris the winner. Edwards refused to recognize Norris's authority.

Shortly after Saucedo's ruling, Edwards left to recruit more settlers from the United States, leaving his younger brother, Benjamin, in charge of the colony. Benjamin could not maintain stability in the colony, and the situation deteriorated rapidly. A vigilante group of earlier settlers harassed many newcomers, and Benjamin made several complaints to state authorities. Unhappy with his tone and the increasing tension, Mexican authorities revoked the land grant in October and instructed the Edwards brothers to leave Mexico. Rumors that Haden Edwards had returned to the United States to raise an army and not just to recruit settlers likely influenced the government's action. Unwilling to abandon his $50,000 (about $1,400,000 as of 2025) investment in the colony, Haden Edwards rejoined his brother in Nacogdoches in late October, continuing their business affairs despite the cancellation of his colonization contract.

== Conflict ==
“	It appears as tho. the people in your quarter have run mad or worse.	”
– excerpt from a letter Stephen F. Austin wrote to Haden Edwards, after some of Edwards's men invaded Nacogdoches

In October, Norris ruled that Edwards had improperly taken land from an existing settler to give to a new immigrant. Norris evicted the immigrant, angering many of the colonists. Later that month, another new immigrant was arrested and ordered to leave the country after refusing to purchase a merchant license before trading with the Indian tribes. On November 22, 1826, local Texian Militia colonel Martin Parmer and 39 other Edwards colonists entered Nacogdoches and arrested Norris, Sepulveda, and the commander of the small Mexican garrison, charging them with oppression and corruption. Haden Edwards was also arrested for violating his expulsion order but was immediately paroled, possibly as a ploy to disguise his own involvement in the plot. A kangaroo court found the other men guilty, removed them from their positions, and banned them from ever holding another public office. The court disbanded after appointing a temporary alcalde. The actions benefitted Parmer personally; several weeks earlier, after Parmer killed a man in a dispute, Norris had issued a warrant for Parmer's arrest. With Norris removed from office, the arrest warrant was voided.

Throughout the fall, Benjamin Edwards had tried to gather support from the Edwards colonists for a potential armed revolt against Mexican authority. Largely unsuccessful, he approached the nearby Cherokee tribe for assistance. Several years earlier, the tribe had applied for title to the lands they occupied in northern East Texas. They were promised but never given a deed from the Mexican authorities. Benjamin Edwards offered the tribe clear title to all of Texas north of Nacogdoches in exchange for armed support for his plans.

On December 16, the Edwards brothers invaded Nacogdoches with only 30 settlers, seizing one building in town, the Old Stone Fort. On December 21, they declared the former Edwards colony to be a new republic, named Fredonia. Within hours of the announcement, the Fredonians signed a peace treaty with the Cherokee, represented by Chief Richard Fields and John Dunn Hunter. Fields and Hunter claimed to represent an additional 23 other tribes and promised to provide 400 warriors. In recognition of the agreement, above the Old Stone Fort flew a new flag containing two stripes (one red, one white) representing the two races. Inscribed on the banner was the motto, "Independence, Liberty, and Justice." Haden Edwards also sent messengers to Louisiana to request aid from the United States military, which refused to intervene. Another emissary sent to invite Stephen F. Austin and his colonists to join the rebellion garnered the rebuke: "You are deluding yourselves and this delusion will ruin you."

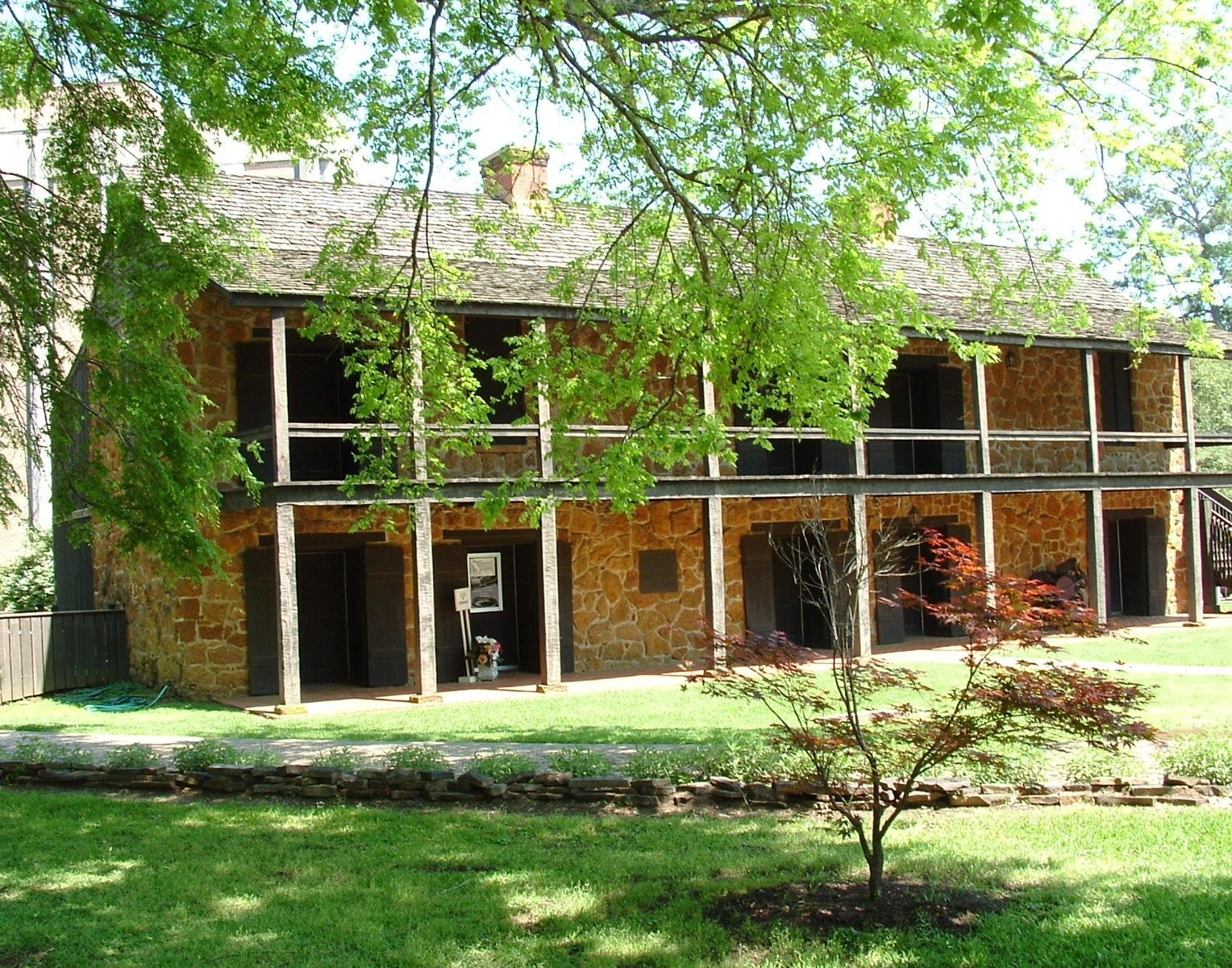
The Old Stone Fort was seized during the Fredonian Rebellion.

Edwards's actions disturbed many of his colonists because of their loyalty to their adopted country or their fear of his alliance with the Cherokee. Mexican authorities were also concerned with the Cherokee alliance, and both Peter Ellis Bean, the Mexican Indian agent, and Saucedo, the political chief, began negotiations with Fields. They explained to the Cherokee that the tribe had not followed proper procedures to attain a land grant and promised that if they reapplied through official channels, the Mexican government would honor their land request. Such arguments and a planned Mexican military response convinced many Cherokee to repudiate their treaty with Edwards.

On news of the November arrest of the alcalde, the Mexican government began preparing to retaliate. On December 11, Lieutenant Colonel Mateo Ahumada, the military commander in Texas, marched from San Antonio de Béxar with 110 members of the infantry and initially stopped in Austin's colony to assess the loyalty of his settlers. On January 1, Austin announced to his colonists that "infatuated madmen at Nacogdoches have declared independence." Much of his colony immediately volunteered to assist in quelling the rebellion. When the Mexican army left for Nacogdoches on January 22, they were joined by 250 Texian Militia from Austin's colony.

Impatient with the army's response time, Norris led 80 men to retake the Old Stone Fort. Although Parmer had fewer than 20 supporters with him, his men routed Norris's force in less than ten minutes. On January 31, Bean, accompanied by 70 Texian Militia from Austin's colony, rode into Nacogdoches. By now, Parmer and Edwards had learned that the Cherokee had abandoned any intention of waging war against Mexico. When not a single Cherokee warrior had appeared to reinforce the revolt, Edwards and his supporters fled. Bean pursued them to the Sabine River, but most, including both Edwards brothers, safely crossed into the United States. Ahumada and his soldiers, accompanied by political chief Saucedo, entered Nacogdoches on February 8 to restore order.

Although the Cherokee had not raised arms against Mexico, their treaty with the Fredonian revolutionaries caused Mexican authorities to question the tribe's loyalty. To demonstrate loyalty to Mexico, the Cherokee council ordered both Fields and Hunter to be executed. Under tribal law, certain offenses such as aiding an enemy of the tribe were punishable by death. By sentencing Fields and Hunter to death for that reason, the Cherokee affirmed that Edwards and his cohorts were their enemies. Both men fled but were soon captured and executed. When the executions were reported to Mexican authorities on February 28, the commandant general of the Eastern Interior Provinces, Anastasio Bustamante, praised the Cherokee for their prompt action.

Bustamante ultimately offered a general amnesty for all who participated in the conflict except for Haden and Benjamin Edwards, Parmer, and Adolphus Sterne, a local merchant who had provided supplies to the rebel force. Like the Edwards brothers, Parmer escaped into Louisiana. Sterne remained and was sentenced to death for treason but was paroled if he swore allegiance to Mexico and never again took up arms against the Mexican government. (Note: Sterne would technically uphold his oath to the Mexican government. During the Texas Revolution, he did not personally fight against Mexico, but he provided funds to raise two companies of soldiers for the Texian Army.)

== Aftermath ==
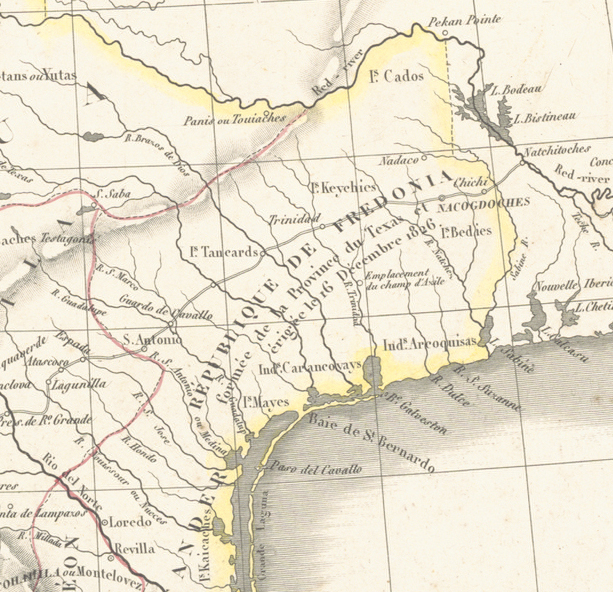
Detail of an 1835 map by Auguste Henri Dufour depicting the "Republic of Fredonia"

The rebellion changed the dynamic between settlers and local tribes. Although the Cherokee repudiated the rebellion, their initial support caused many settlers to distrust the tribe. The rebellion and subsequent Mexican army response also changed the settlers' relationships with other tribes. In preceding years, the Tawakoni and Waco tribes, allied with various Comanche bands, had regularly raided Texas settlements. Fearing that the tribes, like the Cherokee, could ally with other groups against Mexican control, Bustamante began preparations to attack and weaken all hostile tribes in East Texas. On learning of the imminent invasion, in April 1827 the Towakoni and Waco sued for peace. In June, the two tribes signed a peace treaty with Mexico, promising to halt all raids against Mexican settlers. The Towakoni then assisted their allies, the Penateka Comanche, in reaching a treaty with Mexico. When Bustamante's troops left Texas later that year, the Towakoni and Waco resumed their raiding. The Comanche tribe upheld their treaty for many years and often assisted Mexican soldiers in recovering livestock stolen by the other tribes.

The failed rebellion also affected Mexican relations with the United States. Even before the revolt, many Mexican officials had worried that the United States was plotting to gain control of Texas. Once the rebellion came to light, officials suspected that Edwards had been an agent of the United States. To help protect the region, a new, larger garrison was established in Nacogdoches, to be commanded by Colonel Jose de las Piedras. As a direct result of Edwards's actions, the Mexican government authorized an extensive expedition, conducted by General Manuel de Mier y Terán, to inspect the Texas settlements and to recommend a future course of action. Mier y Teran's reports led to the Law of April 6, 1830, which severely restricted immigration into Texas and stopped the import of slaves. Under the law, Mexicans who agreed to relocate to Texas would get good land, free transportation to Texas, and some financial assistance. Convicts would be sent to Texas to build fortifications and roads to stimulate trade. Within Texas the laws were widely denounced both by recent immigrants and by native-born Mexicans and led to further armed conflict between Mexican soldiers and Texas residents.

Some historians regard the Fredonian Rebellion as the beginning of the Texas Revolution. Historian W.B. Bates remarked that the revolt was "premature, but it sparked the powder for later success". The people of Nacogdoches played instrumental roles in other rebellions in Texas over the next few years; in 1832, they expelled Piedras and his troops from Nacogdoches, and many Nacogdoches residents participated in the Texas Revolution.

== See also ==
- List of conflicts involving the Texas Military

== Sources ==
- Bates, W.B. (April 1956). "A Sketch History of Nacogdoches". Southwestern Historical Quarterly. 59 (4). Texas State Historical Association.
- Davis, William C. (2006). Lone Star Rising. College Station, TX: Texas A&M University Press. ISBN 978-1-58544-532-5. Originally published 2004 by New York: Free Press
- Ericson, Joe E. (2000). The Nacogdoches story: an informal history. Heritage Books. ISBN 978-0-7884-1657-6.
- Everett, Dianna (1995). The Texas Cherokees: A People between Two Fires, 1819–1840. Civilization of the American Indian Series, v. 203. Norman, OK: University of Oklahoma Press. ISBN 978-0-585-16884-5.
- Jackson, Jack (2005). Indian Agent: Peter Ellis Bean in Mexican Texas. College Station, Texas: Texas A&M University Press. ISBN 978-1-58544-444-1.
- McDonald, Archie P. "Fredonian Rebellion". Handbook of Texas Online. Texas Historical Association.
- Morton, Ohland (July 1943). "Life of General Don Manuel de Mier y Teran". Southwestern Historical Quarterly. 47 (1). Texas State Historical Association. Archived from the original on August 9, 2020.
- Samora, Julian; Simon, Patricia Vandel; Candelaria, Cordelia; Pulido, Alberto L. (1993). A History of the Mexican-American People. Notre Dame, IN: University of Notre Dame Press. ISBN 978-0-585-33332-8.
- Smith, F. Todd (2000). The Wichita Indians: Traders of Texas and the Southern Plains, 1540–1845. Centennial Series of the Association of Former Students, Texas A&M University, No. 87. College Station, TX: Texas A&M University Press. ISBN 978-0-585-37704-9.
- Weaver, Jace (1997). That the People Might Live: Native American Literatures and Native American Community. New York: Oxford University Press. ISBN 978-0-19-512037-0.
