= Haden Edwards =

Texas settler and land speculator

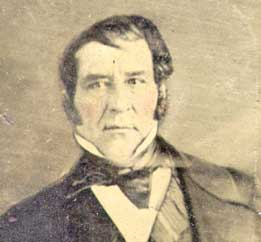
Haden Edwards

Haden Edwards (August 12, 1771 – August 14, 1849) was a Texas settler. Edwards County, Texas on the Edwards Plateau is named for him. In 1825, Edwards received a land grant from the Mexican government, allowing him to settle families in East Texas. His grant included the city of Nacogdoches, and Edwards soon angered many of the previous settlers. After his contract was revoked in 1826, Edwards and his brother declared the colony to be the Republic of Fredonia. He was forced to flee Mexico when the Mexican Army arrived to put down the rebellion, and did not return until after the Texas Revolution had broken out.

== Early life ==
Haden Edwards was born on August 12, 1771 in Stafford County, Virginia, to John Edwards and Susan Edwards (née Wroe). In 1780, his father, John Edwards, moved the family to Kentucky, where he became a successful landowner and a prominent figure in the community. John Edwards later served as a United States senator.

Influenced by his father’s success in land speculation, Edwards pursued similar opportunities in real estate. In 1820, he headed south to Mississippi with his younger brother, Benjamin Edwards, where the brothers acquired a large plantation. Soon afterward, Edwards became aware of Spanish efforts to populate its northern frontier in Texas by encouraging American settlement.

Edwards traveled to Mexico City, where he joined forces with Stephen F. Austin, among others, in a 3-year attempt to persuade various Mexican governments to pass a law to allow Americans to settle in Texas.

In 1824 the Mexican federal government passed a General Colonization Law, which for the first time permitted immigration into Texas. Under the terms of the law, each state would set its own requirements for immigration. Despite his abrasive attitude, Edwards was granted a colonization contract on April 14. The contract allowed him to settle 800 families in East Texas. It contained standard language requiring Edwards to recognize all pre-existing Spanish and Mexican land titles in his grant area, to raise a militia to protect the settlers in the area, and to allow the state land commissioner to certify all deeds that Edwards would award.

Edwards colony encompassed the land in the Navasota River to 20 leagues west of the Sabine River, and from 20 leagues north of the Gulf of Mexico to 15 leagues north of the town of Nacogdoches. To the west and north of the colony were lands controlled by several native tribes which had recently been driven out of the United States. The southern boundary was a colony belonging to Stephen F. Austin, the first empresario in Texas; he had received special permission to establish his colony several years previously. East of Edwards's grant was the former Sabine Free State, an area which had been essentially lawless for several decades.

== Life as an empresario ==
Edwards arrived in Nacogdoches in August 1825. Under the mistaken belief that he was authorized to determine the validity of pre-existing land deeds, in September, Edwards posted notices alerting all residents that they must provide written proof of their ownership or their land would be forfeited and sold at auction. None of the English-speaking residents had valid titles; those who had not arrived as filibusters had been duped by land speculators. Most of the Spanish-speaking landowners were unable to find documentation that their families might have received 70 or more years previously. Edwards's goal was to remove many of the less-prosperous settlers and assign their lands to wealthy planters from the southern United States. A wealthy planter himself, Edwards scorned the residents who were poorer or of a different race than himself. Anticipating that there might be conflict between the new empresario and the long-time residents of the area, municipality acting alcalde Luis Procela and the municipality clerk, Jose Antonio Sepulveda, a member of the Sepúlveda family, began validating old Spanish and Mexican land titles. Edwards accused the men of forging deeds. It is likely that both Edwards and the municipality authorities were in the wrong; the state land commissioner had been given authority to validate existing land titles.

The settlers protested to Political Chief Saucedo. In June 1826, Mexican President Guadalupe Victoria annulled Edwards' contract and expelled him from Mexico. Word traveled slowly. On November 22, 1826, thirty-six armed men who supported Edwards, arrested the anti-Edwards alcalde Samuel Norris and other officials. The party then arrested Jose Antonio Sepulveda, the commander of Nacogdoches' tiny Mexican militia.

== Mexican Response ==
On December 16, 1826 the rebels rode into Nacogdoches and raised a flag of independence. Five days later, on December 21, Edwards signed a declaration establishing the Republic of Fredonia, which claimed territory extending from the Sabine River to the Rio Grande. In response, Mexican authorities moved to suppress the rebellion; Colonel Mateo Ahumada and José de las Piedras (often cited with Saucedo in contemporary accounts) advanced toward East Texas, while Stephen F. Austin mobilized Anglo-American settlers in support of the Mexican government and offered to negotiate with Edwards, an offer Edwards rejected. Internal divisions and infighting further weakened the rebel movement, and when Ahumada and Austin’s forces approached Nacogdoches in January 1827, Edwards’s supporters dispersed. Edwards fled to Louisiana on January 28, 1827, effectively ending the rebellion, which had lasted little more than five weeks. He later returned to Texas during the Texas Revolution, participated in the battle of Nacogdoches in 1832, and ultimately settled there, remaining in the town until his death on August 14, 1849, two days after his 78th birthday.

== See also ==
- Timeline of the Texas Revolution

== Sources ==
- Davis, William C. (2006), Lone Star Rising, College Station, TX: Texas A&M University Press, ISBN 978-1-58544-532-5 originally published 2004 by New York: Free Press
- Ericson, Joe E. (2000), The Nacogdoches story: an informal history, Heritage Books, ISBN 978-0-7884-1657-6
- Samora, Julian; Simon, Patricia Vandel; Candelaria, Cordelia; Pulido, Alberto L. (1993), A History of the Mexican-American People, Notre Dame, IN: University of Notre Dame Press, ISBN 978-0-585-33332-8
