= Nacogdoches (album) =

Studio album by Willie Nelson
- Released: 29 April 2004
- Recorded: 2004
- Genre: Country, Jazz
- Label: Texas Roadhouse

Willie Nelson chronology
Run That by Me One More Time (2003)	Nacogdoches (2004)	It Always Will Be (2004)

Nacogdoches is the 51st studio album by country singer Willie Nelson. The album is a collection of jazz and pop standards. It is named after the city of Nacogdoches, Texas, where the album was recorded. Several of the songs on the album, Nelson had recorded previously: "Columbus Stockade Blues" on the 1970 album Columbus Stockade Blues, "Stardust" on the 1978 Stardust, "I'm Gonna Sit Right Down and Write Myself A Letter" on the 1980 album Somewhere Over the Rainbow, and "Golden Earrings," "A Dreamer's Holiday," "I Can't Begin to Tell You," and "To Each His Own," all four of which were on the 1983 album Without a Song (album).

== Track listing ==
1. "Please Don't Talk About Me When I'm Gone"
2. "A Dreamer's Holiday"
3. "Corrine, Corrina"
4. "Walkin' My Baby Back Home"
5. "To Each His Own"
6. "I'm Gonna Sit Right Down and Write Myself A Letter" (Fred E. Ahlert, Joe Young)
7. "Golden Earrings"
8. "Columbus Stockade Blues"
9. "I Can't Begin to Tell You"
10. "I'll String Along with You"
11. "I'm Beginning to See the Light"
12. "How High the Moon"
13. "Stardust"

== The Players ==
- Willie Nelson - Vocals, Guitar
- Paul Buskirk - Mandolin
- Paul Schmitt - Piano
- Gary Weldon - Harmonica, Flugel Horn
- Mike Lefebvre - Drums
- Mike Nase - Bass

== The Session ==
Produced by Willie Nelson and Paul Buskirk
Engineer - Jim Taylor
Assistant Engineer - Dana Woods, Mike Ward, Spence Peppard
Pro Tools Engineer - Wayne Chance
Mastered by Jerry Tubb
Recorded at Encore Studio, Nacogdoches, Texas
