= Nacogdoches, Texas =

- City
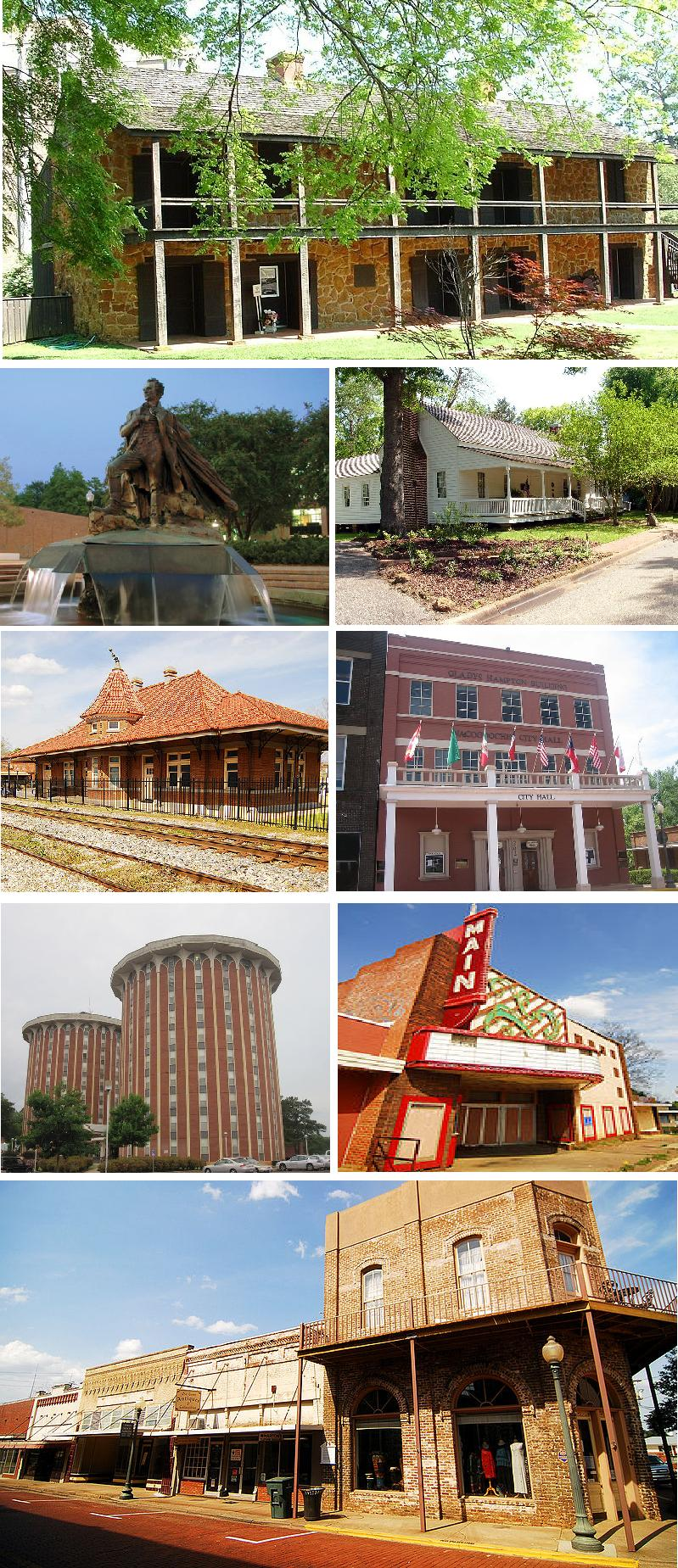
- Clockwise from top: Old Stone Fort, Adolph Stern House, Nacogdoches City Hall, Nacogdoches downtown, Gladys E. Steen Dorms, Depot, Stephen F. Austin statue

- Logo
- Nickname: "The Oldest Town in Texas"
- Location of Nacogdoches, Texas within Nacogdoches County
- Coordinates: 31°36′14″N 94°39′22″W
- Country: United States
- State: Texas
- County: Nacogdoches
- Incorporated (as a town): 1837
- Incorporated (as a city): 1929

Government
  - Type: Council-Manager
  - Mayor: Randy Johnson

Area
  - Total: 27.66 sq mi (71.64 km^{2})
  - Land: 27.61 sq mi (71.51 km^{2})
  - Water: 0.050 sq mi (0.13 km^{2})
- Elevation: 331 ft (101 m)

Population (2020)
  - Total: 32,147
  - Density: 1,190.8/sq mi (459.78/km^{2})
- Demonym: Nacogdochian
- Time zone: UTC-6 (Central (CST))
  - Summer (DST): UTC-5 (CDT)
- ZIP Codes: 75961–75965
- Area code: 936
- FIPS code: 48-50256
- GNIS feature ID: 2411207
- Website: nactx.us

Nacogdoches (/ˌnæk.ə.ˈdoʊ.tʃɪs/, NAK-ə-DOH-chis) is a city in East Texas and the county seat of Nacogdoches County, Texas, United States. As of the 2020 census, Nacogdoches had a population of 32,147. Stephen F. Austin State University is located in Nacogdoches and specializes in forestry and agriculture. Nacogdoches is also known as "The Oldest Town in Texas". Its sister city is Natchitoches, Louisiana.

== History ==
=== Early years ===
Evidence of settlement in the area dates back to 10,000 years ago. Nacogdoches is on or near the site of Nevantin, the primary village of the Nacogdoche tribe of Caddo Indians.

The name, Nacogdoches, originates from the Caddo-speaking Native American tribe "Nacogdoche", and the area remained a Caddo Indian settlement until the early 19th century. In 1716, Spain established a mission there, Misión Nuestra Señora de Guadalupe, the first European construction in the area. The "town" of Nacogdoches got started after the French had vacated the region (1760s, following the French and Indian War), and Spanish officials decided that maintaining the mission was too costly. In 1772, they ordered all settlers in the area to move to San Antonio. Some were eager to escape the wilderness, but others had to be forced from their homes by soldiers. It was one of the original European settlements in the region, populated by Adaeseños from Fort Los Adaes.

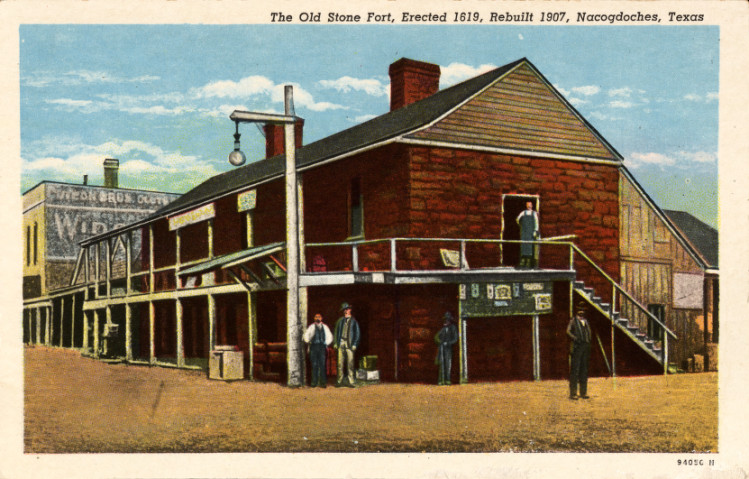
Old Stone Fort Museum, Nacogdoches, Texas

Colonel Antonio Gil Y'Barbo, a Spanish trader, emerged as the leader of the settlers, and in the spring of 1779, he led a group back to Nacogdoches. Later that summer, Nacogdoches received designation from Spain as a pueblo. Y'Barbo, as lieutenant governor of the new town, established the rules and laws for local government. He laid out streets with the intersecting El Camino Real (now State Highway 21) and La Calle del Norte/North Street (now Business U.S. Highway 59-F) as the central point. On the main thoroughfare, he built a stone house for use in his trading business. The house, or Old Stone Fort as it is known today, became a gateway from the United States to the Texas frontier.

=== 1800s ===
The city has been under more flags than the state of Texas, claiming nine flags. In addition to the Six Flags of Texas, it also flew under the flags of the Magee-Gutierrez Republic, the Long Republic, and the Fredonian Rebellion. People from the United States began moving to settle in Nacogdoches in 1820, and Texas's first English-language newspaper was published there. However, the first newspaper published (in the 1700s) was in Spanish. An edition of that newspaper is preserved and shown at the local museum.

In 1832, the Battle of Nacogdoches brought many local settlers together, as they united in their stand to support a federalist form of government. Their successful venture drove the Mexican military from East Texas.

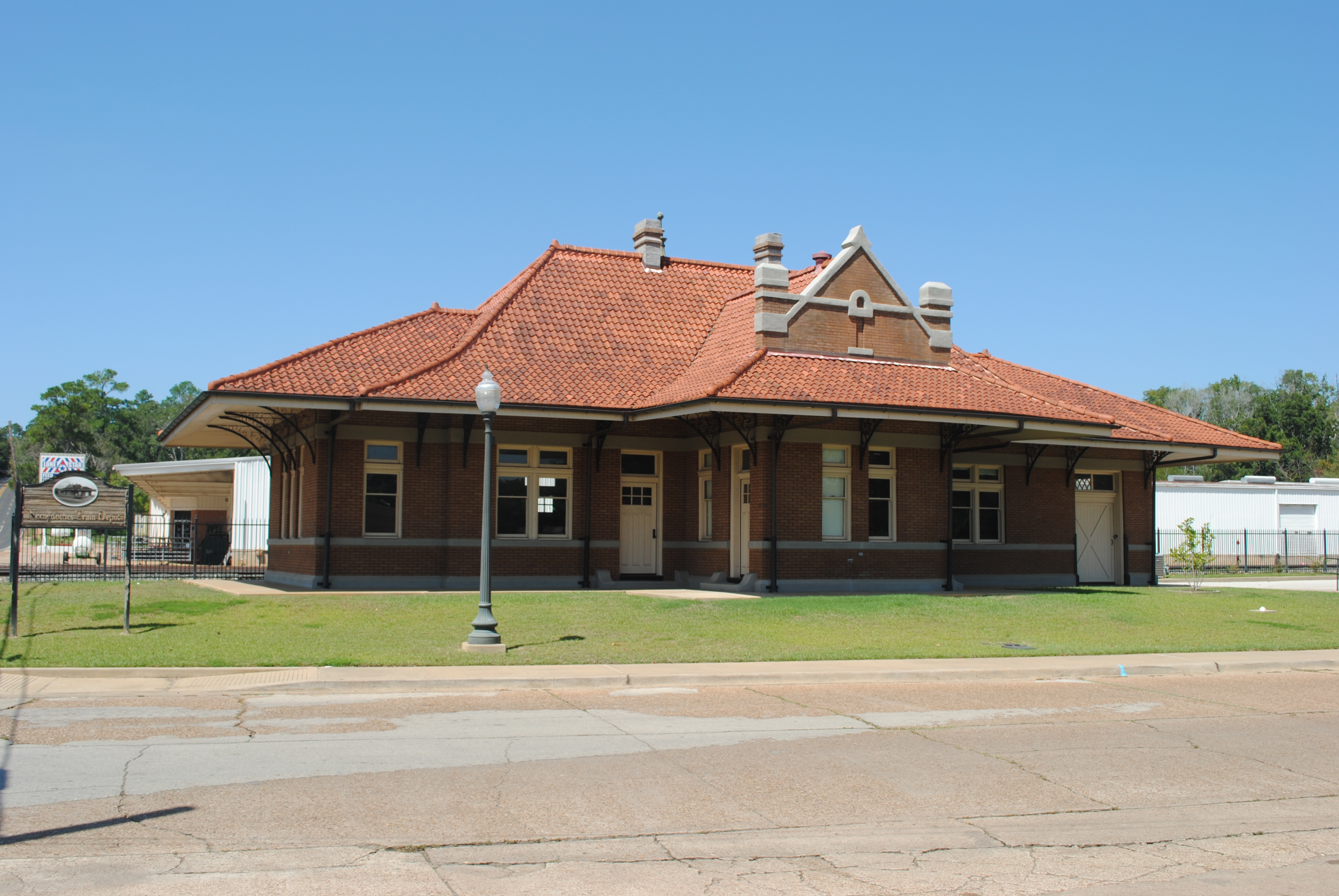
The recently renovated historic Nacogdoches train depot

Thomas Jefferson Rusk was one of the most prominent early Nacogdoches Anglo settlers. A veteran of the Texas Revolution, hero of San Jacinto, he signed the Texas Declaration of Independence and was secretary of war during the Republic of Texas. He was president of the Texas Statehood Commission and served as one of the first two Texas U.S. Senators along with Sam Houston. He worked to establish Nacogdoches University, which operated from 1845 to 1895. The Old Nacogdoches University Building was added to the National Register of Historic Places in 1971. Rusk suffered from depression as a result of the untimely death of his wife and killed himself on July 29, 1857.

Sam Houston lived in Nacogdoches for four years prior to the Texas Revolution (1836) and opened a law office downtown. He courted Anna Raguet, daughter of one of the leading citizens, but Anna rejected him after finding that he was not divorced from his first wife Eliza Allen of Tennessee.

William Goins (Goyens, Goings, Going), the son of a white mother and black father, operated a local inn, trucking service, and blacksmith works and maintained a plantation outside Nacogdoches on Goins Hill. He was married to a white woman and owned slaves. He was appointed as an agent to trade with the Cherokees and was prominent in providing assistance to the Texas Army during the Revolution.

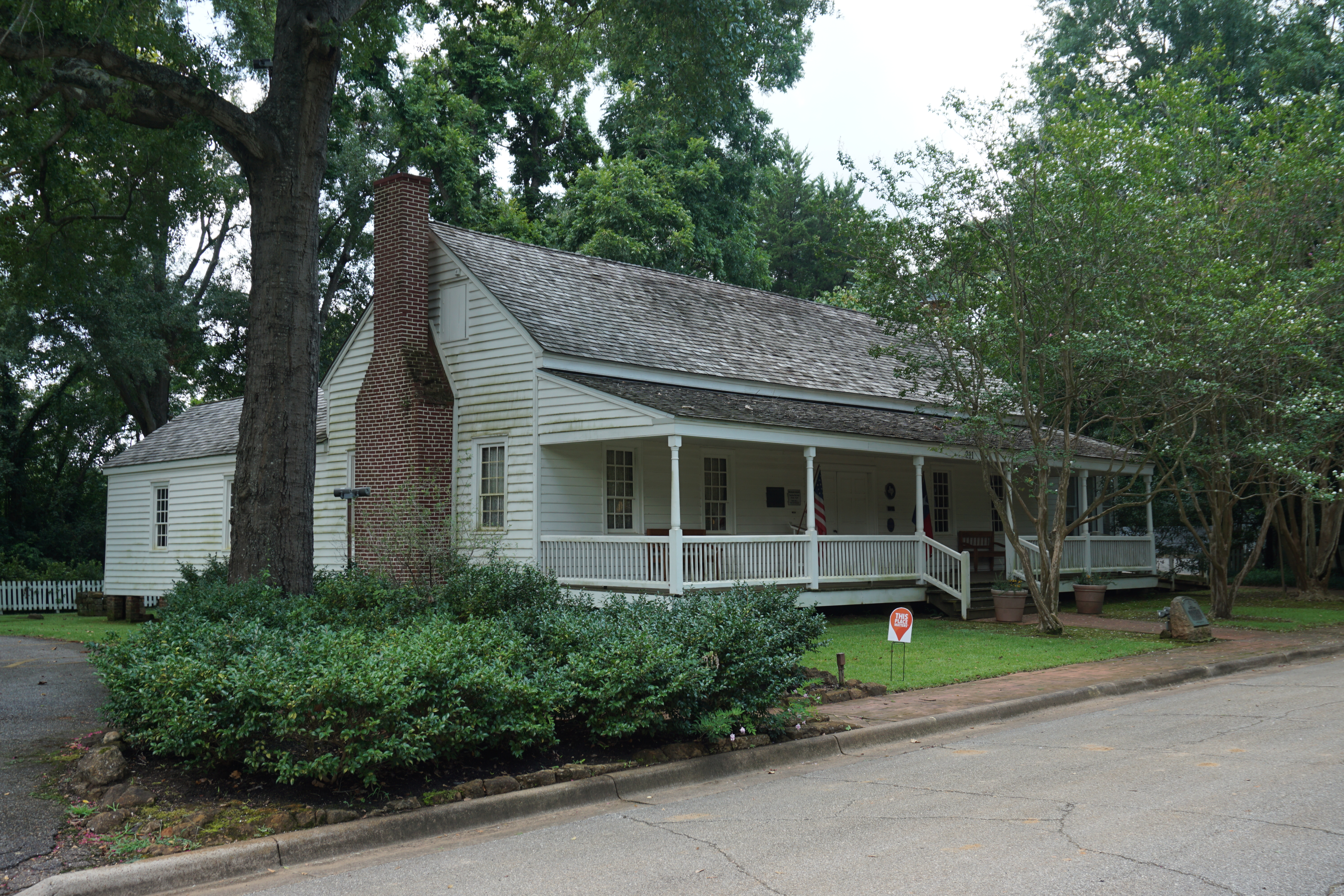
Sterne–Hoya House of Adolphus Sterne, the first mayor of Nacogdoches, now a museum and library

Adolphus Sterne was a merchant of German Jewish extraction who maintained the finest home in town. His frequent visitors included Sam Houston, Thomas Rusk, Chief Bowles and David Crockett, so his diary is one of the best sources for early Nacogdoches history.

Nacogdoches also contains one of the last surviving family-owned homestead plantations in East Texas, the August Tubbe Plantation, owned and operated by the same family which established it in 1859. August Tubbe was a German-born immigrant, who with his elderly mother, left Germany in 1858 and arrived in Nacogdoches by 1859. Their lives are recounted in several books, including a historical fiction novel by Gisela Laudi entitled "I am Justina Tubbe". Tubbe plantation is historically significant in the formation of early life in East Texas, not only in its cotton and sugarcane, but also because it later played an important part in milled-lumber production. Tubbe Sawmill was actually the first water-, and then steam-powered, sawmill in Nacogdoches. During renovations of the Cason-Monk buildings in the early 21st century, boards stamped with Tubbe Mill logos made dating the building possible. The estate contains one of the largest privately owned genealogical archives pertaining to the Tubbe family in existence, providing important insight into early settlers' life during the 19th century. The family has been featured in a number of German museums including the Expo2000 in Bremerhaven Germany. The estate and archives are privately owned and maintained by a descendant of its original founder, and are currently available for study through private appointment only. The Tubbe family is considered to be one of the "founding families" of Nacogdoches, making their mark in many ways spanning over 150 years. August Tubbe was responsible for not only his large 2,000-acre (810 ha) plantation, sawmill, and participation in Milam Masonic Lodge, but also is credited with bringing the now defunct Texas and New Orleans Railroad spur into town. Tubbe estate as a whole is now owned and managed by Thomas VonAugust Tubbe-Brown, the fifth-generation grandson of August Tubbe.

In 1859, the first oil well in Texas began operation here, but it was never so well known as Spindletop, drilled in 1901 near Beaumont. Lyne Taliaferro Barret began this operation, which was interrupted by the American Civil War. However, after the war, Barret returned to Oil Springs, an area about 13 miles (21 km) east of Nacogdoches, to resume his project by acquiring another drilling contract in 1865. Barret struck oil on September 12, 1866, at a depth of 106 feet (32 m). The well produced around 10 barrels of oil per day, but was recorded to produce a range of 8 to 40 barrels. In 1868, the price of oil dropped so low that Barret lost his financial backing, and was forced to resign from the project. The fields then lay dormant for another 20 years, until 1889, when various drilling companies had 40 wells on the site. The site was never very productive, only yielding 54 barrels in 1890. However, it remains the first and oldest oil well in Texas, with production being recorded into the 1950s.

=== 1900s–present ===
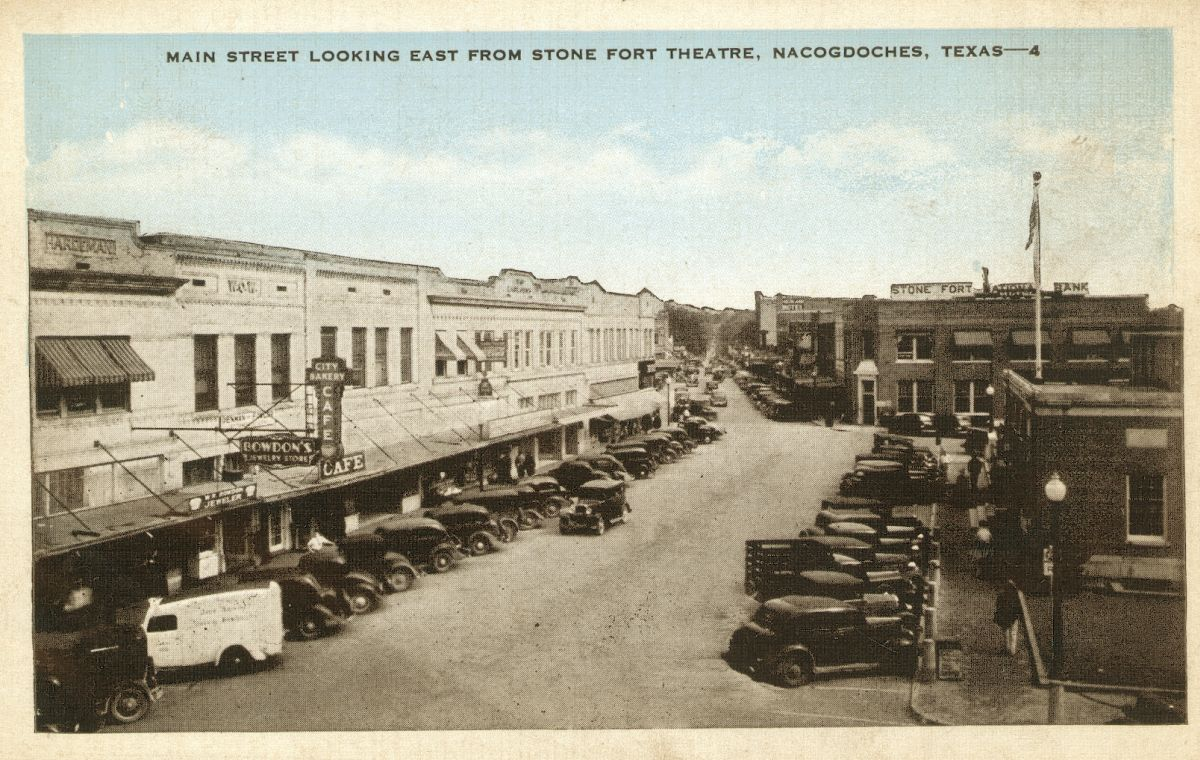
Postcard of Main Street in Nacogdoches, c. late 1930s

In 1912, the Marx Brothers came to town to perform their singing act at the old Opera House (now the SFA Cole Art Center). Their performance was interrupted by a man who came inside shouting, "Runaway mule!" Most of the audience left the building, and when they filed back in, Julius (later known as Groucho) began insulting them, saying "Nacogdoches is full of roaches!" and "The jackass is the flower of Tex-ass!" Instead of becoming angry, audience members laughed. Soon afterward, Julius and his brothers decided to try their hand at comedy instead of singing, at which they had barely managed to scrape together a living. A plaque commemorating the event is posted in downtown Nacogdoches.

On January 4, 1946, a violent tornado devastated part of the city, killing ten people and injuring 200 others. Tornado expert Thomas P. Grazulis estimated the intensity of the tornado to have been F4 on the Fujita scale.

In the edition of March 8, 1950, of You Bet Your Life, Marx said, "I was once pinched in Nacogdoches for playing euchre on the front porch of a hotel. It happened to be on a Sunday. You're not allowed to play euchre in Nacogdoches on a Sunday. As a matter of fact, the way I played it they shouldn't have allowed it on Saturday, either." Marx would often mention Nacogdoches in the show if any contestant came from Texas.

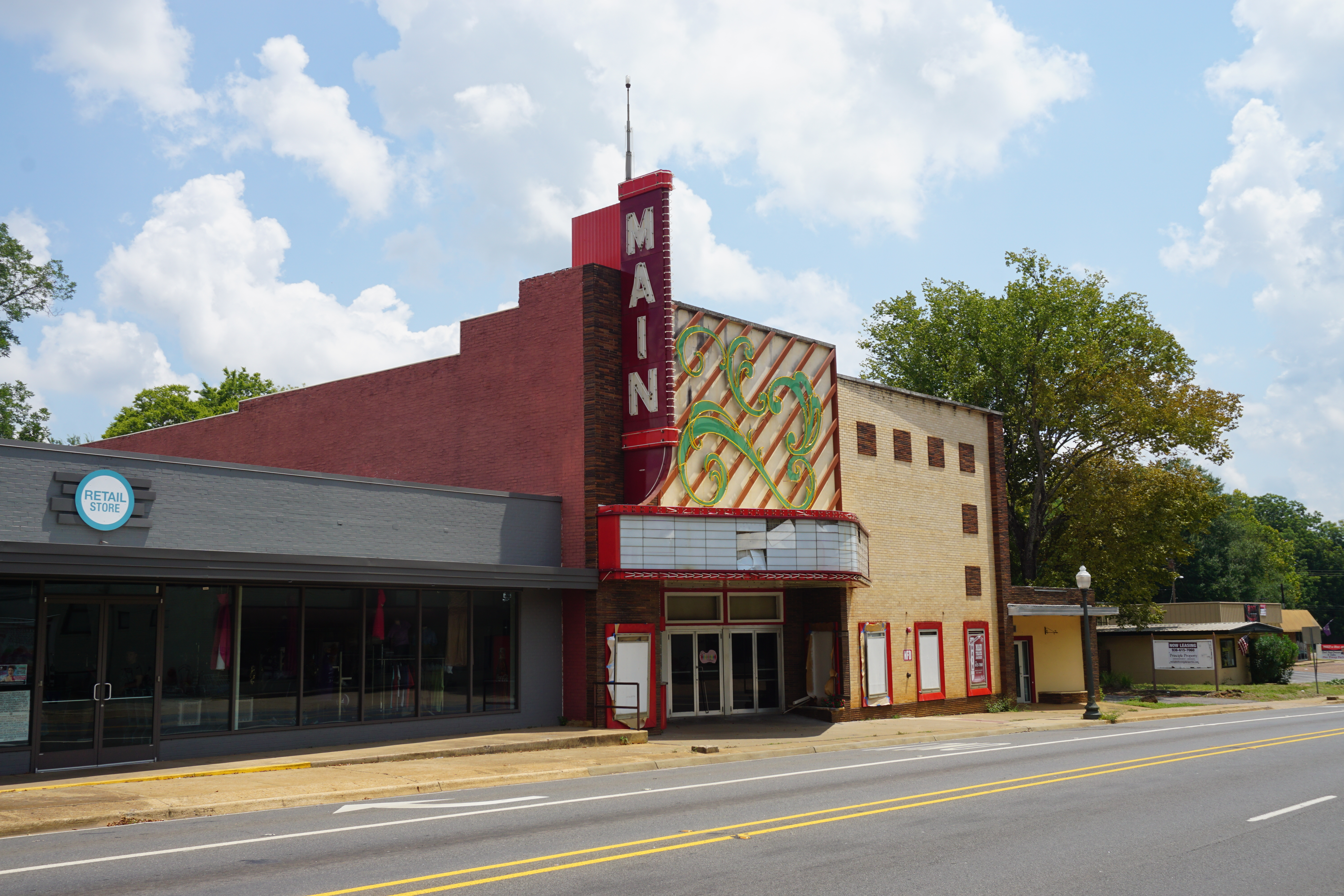
The historic downtown Main Theater

In 1997, singer Willie Nelson came to Nacogdoches to perform with his friend, Paul Buskirk, a mandolin player. During his stay, Nelson recorded a number of jazz songs at Encore Studios. In 2004, he released those recordings on an album called Nacogdoches.

On February 1, 2003, the Space Shuttle Columbia broke up during re-entry, depositing debris across Texas. Much of the debris landed in the Nacogdoches area, and much of the media coverage of the recovery efforts focused on Nacogdoches.

On September 24, 2005, Hurricane Rita struck Nacogdoches as a category-1 hurricane. Nacogdoches experienced the same problems Houston was having because of the unprecedented number of people evacuating the Houston-Galveston area. The city's local shelters were already overwhelmed with evacuees who had come from New Orleans because of Hurricane Katrina. Long lines at gas stations and shortages of supplies, food, and fuel were widespread. Many Houstonians took the Eastex Freeway (U.S. Highway 59) (future Interstate 69) out of Houston to evacuate through East Texas. As a result of Hurricane Rita, U.S. Highway 59 has been designated as an evacuation route by TXDOT, with all of its lanes to be used for contraflow traffic. Nacogdoches was designated as the north-end terminus of the contraflow/evacuation route.

On September 13, 2008, Hurricane Ike struck Nacogdoches as a category-1 hurricane.

Nacogdoches hosts the Texas Blueberry Festival on the second Saturday in June. The community is one of the first Texas Certified Retirement Communities. The community celebrates a host of other events year-round which can be found by going to visitnacogdoches.com

Once a Democratic stronghold, Nacogdoches has in recent years moved steadily toward the Republican Party, being represented in the United States Congress and the Texas State Legislature by Republicans. The city, in general, is very moderate with the co-existence of students of Stephen F. Austin with a liberal left-of-center persuasion and conservative right-of-center city residents.

Nacogdoches has been in the Texas Main Street Program since 1998. Nacogdoches' downtown was named the "Best Historic Venue" by Texas Meetings and Events magazine. Nacogdoches was nominated as one of the "Friendliest Towns in America" by Rand McNally and USA Today.

Nacogdoches is the headquarters of the Texas Wing of the Civil Air Patrol, the Air Force Auxiliary.

== Geography ==
Nacogdoches is about 140 mi (225 km) north-northeast of Houston, 180 mi (290 km) southeast of Dallas, and 90 mi (145 km) southwest of Shreveport.

According to the United States Census Bureau, the city has an area of 25.3 square miles (66 km^{2}), of which 25.2 square miles (65 km^{2}) is land and 0.1 square miles (0.26 km^{2}) (0.24%) is water. The city center is just north of the fork of two creeks, the LaNana and Banita.

Lake Nacogdoches is 10 miles (16 km) west of the city.

=== Climate ===
Nacogdoches, Texas

Climate chart (precipitation, max. and min. temperature)
| J | F | M | A | M | J | J | A | S | O | N | D |
| 4.4 57 36 | 3.9 62 40 | 4.2 69 47 | 4.1 76 55 | 4.8 83 64 | 4.1 90 71 | 2.9 93 74 | 3.1 94 73 | 3.7 88 67 | 4 79 56 | 4.6 68 45 | 4.6 59 38 |
- █ Average max. and min. temperatures in °F
- █ Precipitation totals in inches
- Source: Weather.com / NWS
Metric conversion
| J | F | M | A | M | J | J | A | S | O | N | D |
| 111 14 2 | 98 17 4 | 106 21 8 | 104 24 13 | 123 28 18 | 104 32 22 | 74 34 23 | 79 34 23 | 94 31 19 | 103 26 13 | 116 20 7 | 117 15 3 |
- █ Average max. and min. temperatures in °C
- █ Precipitation totals in mm

- Typically, the warmest month is August.
- The highest recorded temperature was 112 °F (44.4 °C) in 2000.
- The typical coolest month is January.
- The lowest recorded temperature was −3 °F (−19.4 °C) in 2021.
- The most precipitation usually occurs in May.

Climate data for Nacogdoches, Texas (1991–2020 normals, extremes 1973–present)
| Month | Jan | Feb | Mar | Apr | May | Jun | Jul | Aug | Sep | Oct | Nov | Dec | Year |
|---|---|---|---|---|---|---|---|---|---|---|---|---|---|
| Record high °F (°C) | 84 (29) | 92 (33) | 90 (32) | 94 (34) | 101 (38) | 108 (42) | 108 (42) | 109 (43) | 112 (44) | 98 (37) | 88 (31) | 90 (32) | 112 (44) |
| Mean maximum °F (°C) | 76.3 (24.6) | 79.1 (26.2) | 84.2 (29.0) | 87.7 (30.9) | 92.3 (33.5) | 96.6 (35.9) | 100.5 (38.1) | 101.6 (38.7) | 97.4 (36.3) | 92.1 (33.4) | 83.6 (28.7) | 77.7 (25.4) | 102.7 (39.3) |
| Mean daily maximum °F (°C) | 57.7 (14.3) | 62.3 (16.8) | 69.3 (20.7) | 76.3 (24.6) | 82.8 (28.2) | 89.0 (31.7) | 92.6 (33.7) | 93.3 (34.1) | 87.8 (31.0) | 78.2 (25.7) | 67.8 (19.9) | 59.5 (15.3) | 76.4 (24.7) |
| Daily mean °F (°C) | 47.1 (8.4) | 51.0 (10.6) | 57.6 (14.2) | 64.8 (18.2) | 73.1 (22.8) | 80.2 (26.8) | 83.2 (28.4) | 83.2 (28.4) | 77.4 (25.2) | 66.9 (19.4) | 56.3 (13.5) | 48.5 (9.2) | 65.8 (18.8) |
| Mean daily minimum °F (°C) | 36.4 (2.4) | 39.7 (4.3) | 46.0 (7.8) | 53.3 (11.8) | 63.4 (17.4) | 71.4 (21.9) | 73.7 (23.2) | 73.1 (22.8) | 66.9 (19.4) | 55.6 (13.1) | 44.7 (7.1) | 37.5 (3.1) | 55.1 (12.8) |
| Mean minimum °F (°C) | 21.6 (−5.8) | 25.3 (−3.7) | 28.7 (−1.8) | 37.2 (2.9) | 48.3 (9.1) | 62.5 (16.9) | 67.8 (19.9) | 66.1 (18.9) | 53.8 (12.1) | 38.6 (3.7) | 28.1 (−2.2) | 23.6 (−4.7) | 19.6 (−6.9) |
| Record low °F (°C) | 5 (−15) | −3 (−19) | 13 (−11) | 29 (−2) | 36 (2) | 50 (10) | 58 (14) | 55 (13) | 42 (6) | 25 (−4) | 15 (−9) | 3 (−16) | −3 (−19) |
| Average precipitation inches (mm) | 4.46 (113) | 4.21 (107) | 4.47 (114) | 4.01 (102) | 4.53 (115) | 4.09 (104) | 2.88 (73) | 3.66 (93) | 4.07 (103) | 4.34 (110) | 4.44 (113) | 4.78 (121) | 49.94 (1,268) |
| Average snowfall inches (cm) | 0.1 (0.25) | 0.0 (0.0) | 0.0 (0.0) | 0.0 (0.0) | 0.0 (0.0) | 0.0 (0.0) | 0.0 (0.0) | 0.0 (0.0) | 0.0 (0.0) | 0.0 (0.0) | 0.0 (0.0) | 0.0 (0.0) | 0.1 (0.25) |
| Average precipitation days (≥ 0.01 in) | 10.3 | 9.9 | 9.7 | 8.2 | 9.4 | 9.2 | 7.6 | 7.2 | 7.6 | 6.9 | 8.9 | 10.6 | 105.5 |
| Average snowy days (≥ 0.1 in) | 0.0 | 0.0 | 0.0 | 0.0 | 0.0 | 0.0 | 0.0 | 0.0 | 0.0 | 0.0 | 0.0 | 0.0 | 0.0 |
Source: NOAA

== Demographics ==
Historical population
| Census | Pop. | Note | %± |
|---|---|---|---|
| 1850 | 468 | | — |
| 1860 | 485 | | 3.6% |
| 1870 | 500 | | 3.1% |
| 1880 | 333 | | −33.4% |
| 1890 | 1,138 | | 241.7% |
| 1900 | 1,827 | | 60.5% |
| 1910 | 3,369 | | 84.4% |
| 1920 | 3,546 | | 5.3% |
| 1930 | 5,687 | | 60.4% |
| 1940 | 7,538 | | 32.5% |
| 1950 | 12,327 | | 63.5% |
| 1960 | 12,674 | | 2.8% |
| 1970 | 22,544 | | 77.9% |
| 1980 | 27,149 | | 20.4% |
| 1990 | 30,872 | | 13.7% |
| 2000 | 29,914 | | −3.1% |
| 2010 | 32,996 | | 10.3% |
| 2020 | 32,147 | | −2.6% |
U.S. Decennial Census

=== 2020 census ===
As of the 2020 census, Nacogdoches had a population of 32,147. The median age was 26.9 years. 20.1% of residents were under the age of 18 and 13.4% of residents were 65 years of age or older. For every 100 females there were 85.4 males, and for every 100 females age 18 and over there were 81.0 males age 18 and over.

98.5% of residents lived in urban areas, while 1.5% lived in rural areas.

There were 12,400 households in Nacogdoches, of which 26.4% had children under the age of 18 living in them. Of all households, 30.4% were married-couple households, 23.7% were households with a male householder and no spouse or partner present, and 39.8% were households with a female householder and no spouse or partner present. About 37.6% of all households were made up of individuals and 11.7% had someone living alone who was 65 years of age or older.

There were 14,468 housing units, of which 14.3% were vacant. The homeowner vacancy rate was 2.0% and the rental vacancy rate was 14.1%.

Among the population, there was a 37.5% homeownership rate and 2,068 vacant housing units in the city limits as of the 2020 census.

Racial composition as of the 2020 census
| Race | Number | Percent |
|---|---|---|
| White | 17,198 | 53.5% |
| Black or African American | 8,483 | 26.4% |
| American Indian and Alaska Native | 213 | 0.7% |
| Asian | 548 | 1.7% |
| Native Hawaiian and Other Pacific Islander | 4 | 0.0% |
| Some other race | 3,042 | 9.5% |
| Two or more races | 2,659 | 8.3% |
| Hispanic or Latino (of any race) | 6,500 | 20.2% |

=== 2010 census ===
According to the 2010 census, Nacogdoches had a population of 32,996. The racial and ethnic composition of the population was 51.2% White, 28.4% Black, 0.5% Native American, 1.8% Asian, 0.1% Pacific Islander, 0.1% reporting some other race, 2.3% reporting two or more races, and 16.8% Hispanic or Latino American.

=== 2000 census ===
At the census of 2000, 29,914 people, 11,220 households, and 5,935 families resided in the city. The population density was 1,185.9 inhabitants per square mile (457.9/km^{2}). The 12,329 housing units averaged 488.7 per square mile (188.7/km^{2}). The racial makeup of the city was 65.98% White, 25.06% African American, 1.13% Asian, 0.34% Native American, 0.11% Pacific Islander, 5.84% from other races, and 1.55% from two or more races. Hispanics or Latinos of any race were 10.82% of the population.

=== American Community Survey ===
The median household income for the city was $54,444 from 2014 to 2019, against the statewide median household income of $64,034. Married-couple families had a median household income of $78,843 while non-family households had a median income of $22,076. Among the population, 31% of the city lived at or below the poverty line; 34% of the population aged 18 to 64 lived at or below the poverty line, and 33.9% of the population under age 18 lived at or below the poverty line.

== Economy ==
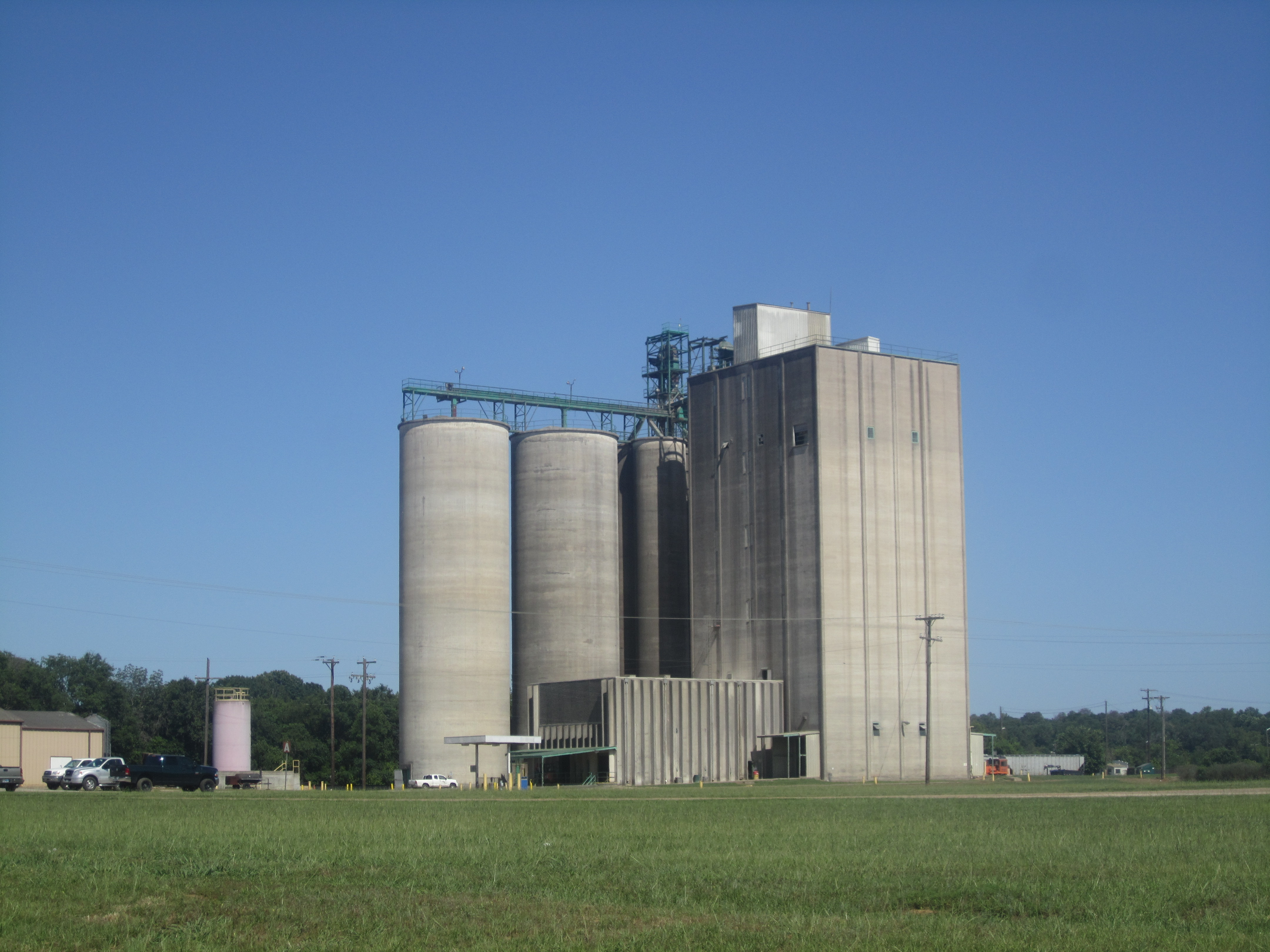
Pilgrim's Pride is the largest private employer in Nacogdoches.

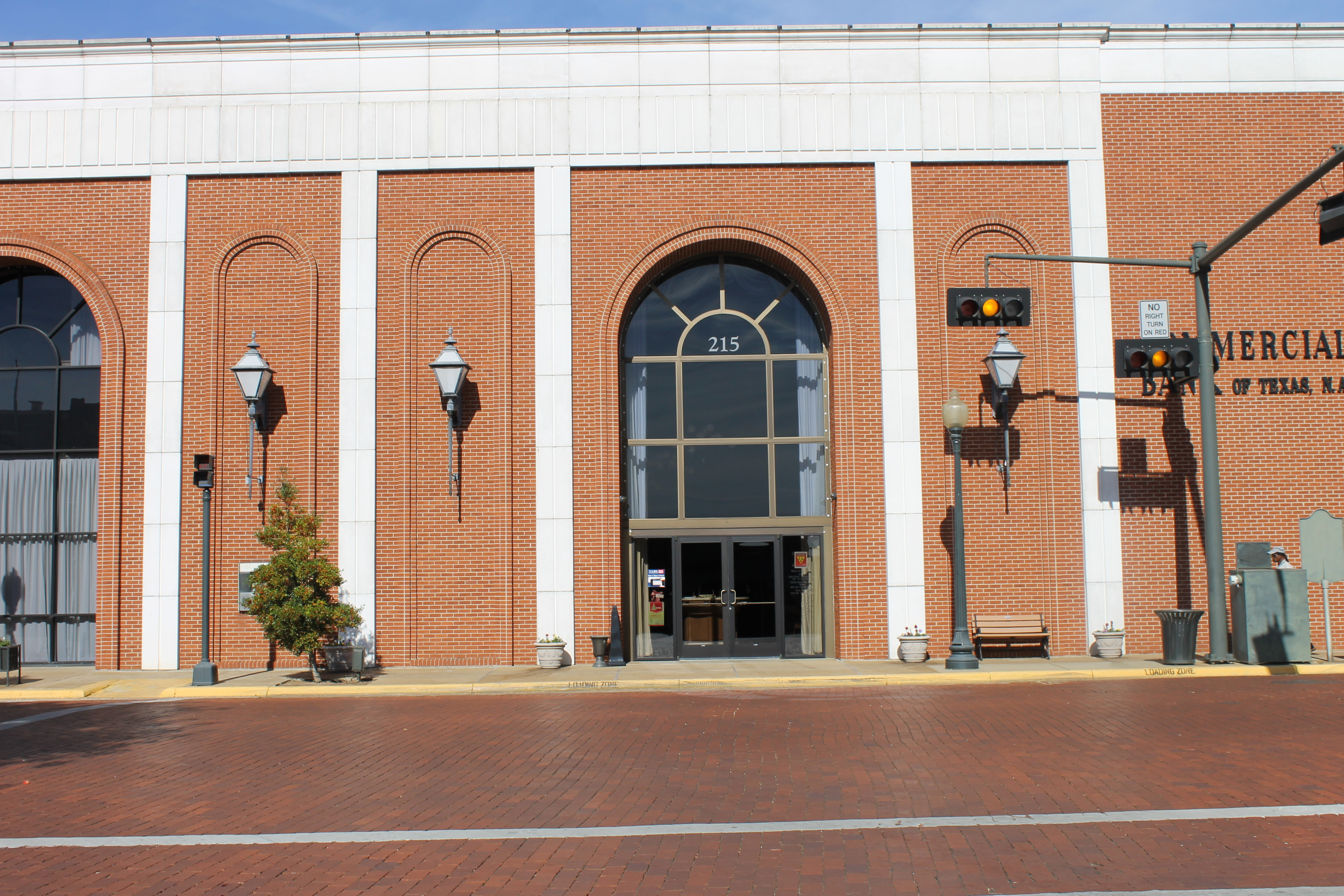
Commercial Bank of Texas on North Street in downtown Nacogdoches

The economy of Nacogdoches is heavily dependent on Stephen F. Austin State University. Like many college towns in the United States, Nacogdoches businesses heavily depend on university students as customers and regularly employ them. Other large sectors of the local economy are healthcare, manufacturing, agriculture, and lumber.

According to the city's 2017 Comprehensive Annual Financial Report, the top employers in the city were:

| # | Employer | Employees 2017 | Employees 2008 | Rank 2008 |
|---|---|---|---|---|
| 1 | Stephen F. Austin State University | 1,659 | 1,500 | 1 |
| 2 | Pilgrim's Pride | 1,657 | 1,200 | 2 |
| 3 | Nacogdoches Independent School District | 972 | 880 | 4 |
| 4 | Nacogdoches County Hospital District | 874 | 650 | 5 |
| 5 | Etech, Inc. | 565 | 900 | 3 |
| 6 | Nacogdoches Medical Center | 545 | 575 | 6 |
| 7 | Walmart | 473 | 460 | 7 |
| 8 | City of Nacogdoches | 323 | 350 | 10 |
| 9 | Nacogdoches County | 275 | (not specified) | |
| 10 | Eaton (Cooper Power Systems) | 257 | (not specified) | |
| | NIBCO | (not specified) | 400 | 8 |
| | Foretravel Motorcoach | (not specified) | 350 | 9 |

== Government ==
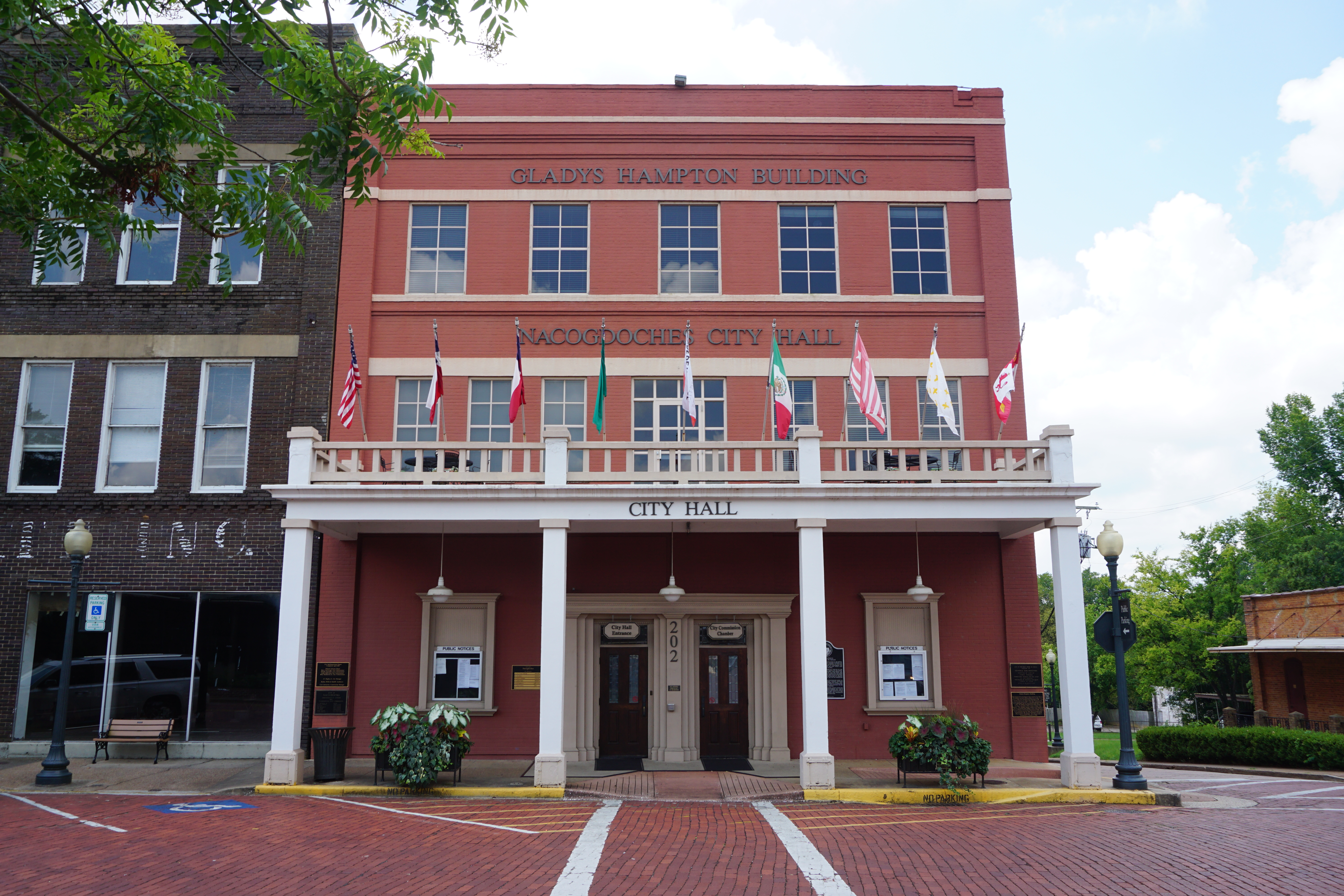
Nacogdoches City Hall

The management and coordination of city services is overseen by a mayor, city manager and other administrative and operational roles.

=== Local government ===
County government

According to the county's most recent Comprehensive Annual Financial Report Fund Financial Statements, the county's various funds had $23.5 million in revenues, $23.6 million in expenditures, $57 million in total assets, and $15 million in total liabilities. The county had $7.3 million in investments.

=== State government ===
Nacogdoches is represented in the Texas Senate by Republican Robert Nichols, District 3, and in the Texas House of Representatives by Republican Joanne Shofner, District 11.{{}}

The Texas Department of Criminal Justice operates the Nacogdoches District Parole Office in Nacogdoches.

=== Federal government ===
Nacogdoches is part of Texas's 17th congressional district, which is currently represented by Republican Pete Sessions.

== Education ==
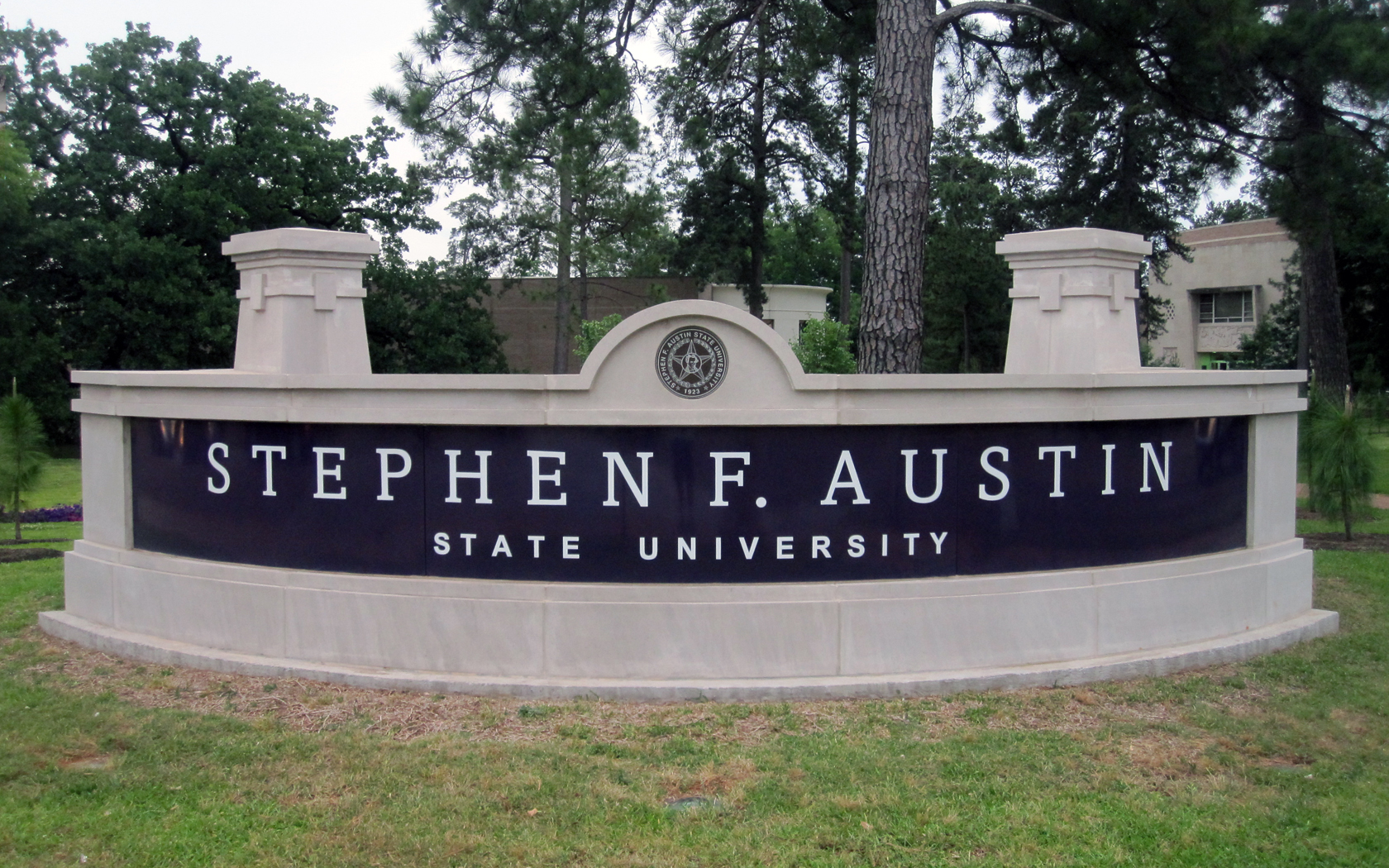
Stephen F. Austin State University in Nacogdoches

The city of Nacogdoches is primarily served by the Nacogdoches Independent School District. Small portions of the city are also zoned into the Woden ISD. School districts serving surrounding areas include Central Heights, Douglass, Garrison, Martinsville, Chireno and Cushing districts.

Nacogdoches is home to Stephen F. Austin State University, which is a state institution of about 13,000 students. Stephen F. Austin is also home to the East Texas Historical Association. Angelina College operates a branch campus in Nacogdoches.

The Texas Legislature designated Nacogdoches County as being in the boundary of Angelina College's district.

== Newspaper ==
The Daily Sentinel, founded in 1899, is published and distributed in the Nacogdoches area.

== Points of interest ==
- Mast Arboretum
- Millard's Crossing Historic Village
- Old Stone Fort Museum

== Notable people ==
- Shirley J. Allen, academic
- Oscar P. Austin, Medal of Honor recipient
- Roy Blake, Sr., Texas legislator and businessman, and former Nacogdoches City Councillor
- Antonio Gil Y'Barbo, frontier trader
- Sam Houston, president of the Republic of Texas
- Joseph W. Kennedy, co-discoverer of plutonium
- Joe R. Lansdale, award-winning author and martial-arts expert
- Leslie Ludy, author and public speaker
- Thomas Jefferson Rusk, military leader and U.S. Senator
- Cornelia Branch Stone, president-general of the United Daughters of the Confederacy; president, Texas Woman's Press Association
- Albert Thomas, U.S. Representative
- Lera Millard Thomas, U.S. Representative

=== Athletes ===
- Grady Allen, football player
- Brandon Belt, baseball player
- Bucky Brandon, baseball player
- Domingo Bryant, football player
- Larry Centers, football player
- Clint Dempsey, soccer player
- Philip Humber, baseball player
- Damion James, basketball player
- Mark Moseley, football player
- Bum Phillips, football coach
- Greg Roberts, football player
- Jeremiah Trotter, football player
- Thomas Walkup, basketball player
- Grayson Rodriguez, baseball player
- Brandon Jones, football player
- Jaxon Smith-Njigba, football player

=== Entertainers ===
- Tony Frank, actor
- Kasey Lansdale, actress and musician
- Bob Luman, musician
- Brad Maule, actor
- Ron Raines, actor
- Alana Stewart, actress, talk show host
- Joseph Fuller, musician

== See also ==
- List of museums in East Texas
