= Broaddus =

Broaddus may also refer to:

== People ==
- Broaddus (surname)
- Maurice Broaddus Rowe (1850–1925), American politician from Virginia

== Places ==
- Broaddus, Texas, town in San Augustine County, Texas
- Broaddus, Virginia, unincorporated community in Caroline County, Virginia
- Mayor Andrew Broaddus, lifesaving station in Louisville, Kentucky

== Other ==
- Alderson Broaddus University, former university in West Virginia
- Broaddus High School, secondary school in Broaddus, Texas
- Broaddus Independent School District, school district in Broaddus, Texas
