= San Augustine (disambiguation) =

San Augustine may refer to:

- San Augustine, Texas
- San Augustine County, Texas
- San Augustine Independent School District
- San Augustine County Courthouse and Jail
