= Vici Media Group =

Vici Media Group is a Republican Party political consulting disinformation company based in Austin, Texas. It was founded in 2011 and is run by brothers Patrick (born c. 1989) and Ryan Mauldin. Their slogan is "We Kick A**", intentionally censored, and in some cases using the Democratic donkey in place for "A**".

Vici creates branding, fake websites, and mailers for conservative candidates, causes, and parties.

== Sites and campaigns ==
Vici has created branding or sites for:

- Live Action (organization)
- Texas Federation of Republican Women
- Liberty For All PAC
- Ohio Right to Life
- Texas Right to Life PAC
- Texas Pregnancy Care Network
- Massachusetts Citizens for Life
- Thrive Women's Clinic

=== Trump ===
In June 2016, the Trump campaign, through Brad Parscale, hired Vici Media Group to help with the campaign. Vici is also part of the 2020 campaign.

In July 2016, after Hillary Clinton asked her voters to "Pokémon Go to the polls", Vici had a popular viral response Facebook video titled "Crooked Hillary NO". It was posted to the official Trump Facebook page but didn't have official endorsement, an indication the campaign paid for it, nor attribution to Vici.

=== Faux Democratic sites ===
In advance of the 2020 presidential election, Patrick Mauldin created parody, faux, fake or troll websites in the names of notable Democratic candidates, including:

- "Biden2020", JoeBiden.info; was ranked higher than the official page on Google for some time
- "Millionaire Bernie"
- "Elizabeth Warren for Chief": ElizabethWarren.co
- "Kamala Harris for Arresting the People", kamalaharris.info
- Cory Booker

Patrick Mauldin's Reddit account has been suspended, but he posted about the sites on r/The_Donald. When The New York Times discovered Patrick was behind the sites through shared analytics tags, he asked to not be identified. CNBC opted to not name Patrick.
