= Benina, Texas =

Benina was a town in southeastern San Augustine County, Texas, United States. It was 20 miles southeast of San Augustine.

== History ==
The first post office in the area was Ashton, opened in 1871. In 1874, the name was changed to Boren's Mills. In 1884, Boren's Mills had approximately 100 residents, three cotton gin-gristmill combinations, and a blacksmith shop. The name of the town was changed to Benina in 1889. Benina had 30 inhabitants, a Methodist and a Baptist church in 1896. The population was only 25 in 1914, and the post office was closed in 1920. By the 1940s, Benina was no longer on state highway maps.
