= Ayish Bayou =

River in Texas, United States of America

Location
- Country: United States

Physical characteristics
- Source
  - location: San Augustine County
  - coordinates: 31°37′N 94°06′W
- Mouth
  - coordinates: 31°04′N 94°05′W
- Length: 47 mi (76 km)
- Basin size: San Augustine County, Jasper County, Texas

Ayish Bayou is a river in Texas. Ayish Bayou begins about 7 miles (11 km) north of San Augustine in northern San Augustine County. The course of the stream runs southeast for 47 miles (76 km) through the center of the county, before discharging into the Angelina River in northern Jasper County, Texas

== See also ==
- List of rivers of Texas
