= Broadus =

Broadus may refer to:

- Broadus Airport, a general aviation airport in Montana, United States
- Broadus, Montana, United States
- Broadus (name)

== See also ==
- Broadus (disambiguation)
