= Black Ankle =

Black Ankle may refer to:

- Black Ankle, North Carolina, an unincorporated community in Montgomery County
- Black Ankle, Texas, an unincorporated community in San Augustine County
