= Terry Teagle =

American basketball player (born 1960)

Personal information
- Born: April 10, 1960 (age 66) Broaddus, Texas, U.S.
- Listed height: 6 ft 5 in (1.96 m)
- Listed weight: 195 lb (88 kg)

Career information
- High school: Broaddus (Broaddus, Texas)
- College: Baylor (1978–1982)
- NBA draft: 1982: 1st round, 16th overall pick
- Drafted by: Houston Rockets
- Playing career: 1982–1995
- Position: Shooting guard / small forward
- Number: 20, 22, 10

Career history
- 1982–1984: Houston Rockets
- 1984: Detroit Pistons
- 1984–1985: Detroit Spirits
- 1985–1990: Golden State Warriors
- 1990–1992: Los Angeles Lakers
- 1992–1993: Benetton Treviso
- 1993: Houston Rockets
- 1993–1994: Goccia di Carnia Udine
- 1994–1995: Atenas de Córdoba

Career highlights
- Second-team All-American – AP (1982); SWC Player of the Year (1980); 3× First-team All-SWC (1980–1982)

Career NBA statistics
- Points: 7,982 (11.6 ppg)
- Rebounds: 1,803 (2.6 rpg)
- Assists: 956 (1.4 apg)
- Stats at NBA.com
- Stats at Basketball Reference

Terry Michael Teagle (born April 10, 1960) is an American former professional basketball player, whose National Basketball Association (NBA) career lasted from 1982 to 1993. During his playing career, at a height of 6 ft 5 in (1.96 m) tall, he played at the shooting guard position.

== High school ==
Teagle attended Broaddus High School, in Broaddus, Texas, where he also played high school basketball.

== College career ==
After high school, Teagle attended Baylor University, where he played college basketball with the Baylor Bears, from 1978 to 1982. Teagle began his college career as fellow Bear Vinnie Johnson was winding his up. During his college career, he was a three time All-Southwest Conference First Team selection, (1980, 1981, 1982), the Southwest Conference Player of the Year (1980), and an All-American Second Team selection, in 1982.

== Professional career ==
=== NBA ===
Teagle was selected 16th overall, in the first round of the 1982 NBA draft, by the Houston Rockets. He lasted two seasons in Houston (1982–84), before moving on to play with the Detroit Pistons (1984–85), Golden State Warriors (1984–90), and Los Angeles Lakers (1990–92), before returning to the Rockets to play two games in April 1993. On April 15, 1991, Teagle scored a basket against the Dallas Mavericks after catching a pass from Laker teammate Earvin "Magic" Johnson, giving Johnson his 9,888th career assist, to surpass Oscar Robertson as the NBA's all-time leader in career assists at the time. Teagle played in 732 games in the NBA (regular season and playoffs combined), with career averages of 11.6 points, 2.6 rebounds, and 1.4 assists per game.

=== Europe ===
During the 1992–93 FIBA EuroLeague season, Teagle signed a one-year contract with Benetton Treviso of the Italian league. He reached the EuroLeague Finals with the club, while playing alongside teammate Toni Kukoč. He averaged 19.7 points, 5.6 rebounds, and 1.2 assists per game, during EuroLeague play. Treviso eventually lost in the EuroLeague Finals to the French club Limoges CSP, by a score of 59–55, with Teagle scoring 19 points and grabbing four rebounds. He was the top scorer of the Finals.

== Career statistics ==
Legend
| GP | Games played | GS | Games started | MPG | Minutes per game |
| FG% | Field goal percentage | 3P% | 3-point field goal percentage | FT% | Free throw percentage |
| RPG | Rebounds per game | APG | Assists per game | SPG | Steals per game |
| BPG | Blocks per game | PPG | Points per game | **Bold** | Career high |
| * | Led the league |

=== NBA ===
==== Regular season ====
| Year | Team | GP | GS | MPG | FG% | 3P% | FT% | RPG | APG | SPG | BPG | PPG |
|---|---|---|---|---|---|---|---|---|---|---|---|---|
| 1982–83 | Houston | 73 | 44 | 23.4 | .428 | .345 | .696 | 2.7 | **2.1** | .7 | .2 | 10.4 |
| 1983–84 | Houston | 68 | 0 | 9.1 | .470 | .259 | **.841** | 1.1 | .9 | .2 | .1 | 5.0 |
| 1984–85 | Detroit | 2 | 0 | 2.5 | .500 | – | – | .0 | .0 | .0 | .0 | 1.0 |
| 1984–85 | Golden State | 19 | 3 | 18.1 | **.541** | **.500** | .714 | 2.3 | .7 | .7 | .3 | 9.1 |
| 1985–86 | Golden State | **82** | **52** | 26.3 | .496 | .160 | .796 | 2.9 | 1.4 | .9 | **.4** | 14.2 |
| 1986–87 | Golden State | **82*** | 0 | 20.1 | .458 | .000 | .778 | 2.1 | 1.3 | .8 | .2 | 11.2 |
| 1987–88 | Golden State | 47 | 4 | 20.4 | .454 | .111 | .802 | 1.7 | 1.3 | .7 | .1 | 12.6 |
| 1988–89 | Golden State | 66 | 41 | 23.8 | .476 | .167 | .809 | 4.0 | 1.5 | **1.2** | .3 | 15.2 |
| 1989–90 | Golden State | **82*** | 49 | **29.0** | .480 | .214 | .830 | **4.5** | 1.9 | 1.1 | .2 | **16.1** |
| 1990–91 | L.A. Lakers | **82*** | 0 | 18.3 | .443 | .000 | .819 | 2.2 | 1.0 | .4 | .1 | 9.9 |
| 1991–92 | L.A. Lakers | **82** | 0 | 19.5 | .452 | .250 | .766 | 2.2 | 1.4 | .8 | .1 | 10.7 |
| 1992–93 | Houston | 2 | 0 | 12.5 | .286 | – | .500 | 1.5 | 1.0 | .0 | .0 | 2.5 |
| Career | | 687 | 193 | 21.1 | .465 | .210 | .792 | 2.6 | 1.4 | .8 | .2 | 11.6 |

==== Playoffs ====
| Year | Team | GP | GS | MPG | FG% | 3P% | FT% | RPG | APG | SPG | BPG | PPG |
|---|---|---|---|---|---|---|---|---|---|---|---|---|
| 1987 | Golden State | 10 | 0 | 23.3 | .460 | .000 | .789 | 2.0 | 1.3 | .8 | .1 | 14.4 |
| 1989 | Golden State | 8 | 0 | 30.0 | **.496** | .000 | **.818** | **4.6** | 1.3 | 1.0 | .4 | **19.8** |
| 1991 | L.A. Lakers | **18** | 1 | 15.2 | .376 | – | .781 | 1.6 | .6 | .4 | .2 | 6.6 |
| 1992 | L.A. Lakers | 4 | **2** | **31.5** | .491 | – | .800 | 3.3 | **2.0** | **1.3** | **.5** | 17.5 |
| 1993 | Houston | 5 | 0 | 2.4 | .400 | – | .000 | .0 | .0 | .0 | .0 | .8 |
| Career | | 45 | 3 | 19.7 | .451 | .000 | .781 | 2.2 | .9 | .6 | .1 | 11.0 |
