= Altonia, Texas =

Ghost town in Texas, US

Altonia is a ghost town in San Augustine County, Texas, United States. A post office called Ransom opened there from 1886, later closing; it was renamed to Altonia in 1895, likely in reference to the community's location on a ridge. At its peak in 1933, it had a population of 25, and was abandoned by the 1940s.
