= Dominique Edison =

American football player (born 1986)

No. 19
- Position: Wide receiver

Personal information
- Born: July 16, 1986 (age 40); San Augustine, Texas, U.S.
- Listed height: 6 ft 3 in (1.91 m)
- Listed weight: 200 lb (91 kg)

Career information
- High school: San Augustine
- College: Stephen F. Austin
- NFL draft: 2009: 6th round, 206th overall pick

Career history
- Tennessee Titans (2009–2010); Seattle Seahawks (2010–2011)*; Dallas Cowboys (2011)*; Houston Texans (2011)*; Edmonton Eskimos (2013)*
- * Offseason or practice squad member only
- Stats at Pro Football Reference

Dominique Jamaar Edison (born July 16, 1986) is an American former professional football player who was a wide receiver in the National Football League (NFL). He played college football for the Stephen F. Austin Lumberjacks and was selected by the Tennessee Titans in the sixth round of the 2009 NFL draft.

He was also a member of the Seattle Seahawks, Dallas Cowboys, Houston Texans and Edmonton Eskimos.

== College career ==
Playing at Stephen F. Austin State University, Edison caught 179 balls over four years, including 27 touchdowns. In 2008, he caught 64 passes for 1,018 yards and 18 touchdowns in 11 games with the Lumberjacks. He was statistically ranked among the top five receivers nationally. He also tied with fellow Texan and former OSU receiver Dez Bryant of the Dallas Cowboys for touchdown receptions. He holds receiving records at SFASU for touchdowns in a season, touchdown catches, and receptions. He also holds the school record in the forty-yard dash at 4.32 seconds. He chose Stephen F. Austin over LSU, Texas Tech, and Missouri. He was considered a sleeper prospect for the 2009 NFL draft and was invited to the NFL Combine.

== Professional career ==
Pre-draft measurables
Height	Weight	Arm length	Hand span	40-yard dash	10-yard split	20-yard split	20-yard shuttle	Three-cone drill	Vertical jump	Broad jump
6 ft 2 1/8 in (1.88 m)	204 lb (93 kg)	32 1/2 in (0.83 m)	8 1/2 in (0.22 m)	4.42 s	1.53 s	2.53 s	4.18 s	7.09 s	37.0 in (0.94 m)	10 ft 0 in (3.05 m)
All values from NFL Combine/Pro Day

=== Tennessee Titans ===
The Tennessee Titans selected Edison in the sixth round with the 206th overall pick of the 2009 NFL draft. In 2010, the Tennessee Titans released Edison.

=== Seattle Seahawks ===
Edison signed with the Seattle Seahawks after being released by the Titans. He was waived on August 6, 2011.

=== Dallas Cowboys ===
Edison was claimed off waivers by the Dallas Cowboys the same day he was released by Seattle. He was waived/injured on August 16, 2011, and later released with an injury settlement on August 24.

=== Houston Texans ===
In mid September, Edison sign with the Houston Texans. He was waived a month later after injuring his knee once again.

May 12, 2012, Edison entered minicamp with the Carolina Panthers but did not make it to camp with the team.

=== Edmonton Eskimos ===
Edison sign with Edmonton Eskimos August 13, 2013, and was later cut August 28, 2013.

== Personal life ==
Dominique Edison grew up in San Augustine, Texas. As a youth, he was highly involved in church, where he served as an usher. In junior high school, he was a running back and defensive back. In his high school career, he participated in basketball where he was a three-time all-state and all-district letterwinner, and was heavily recruited by top Division-I programs. In baseball, he was also a three-time letterwinner and all-district outfielder. His senior year in high school would prove to be his best as he guided his football team to a state championship against current Washington Redskins quarterback Colt McCoy and the Jim Ned Indians in the 2003 football season. He was also named to the first-team golden triangle squad, along with fellow running back Tydrick Davis and quarterback Brandon Sharp. In track and field he won the state title in the 200 meter dash with a time of 21.9 seconds, In college, he was a volunteer member and mentor to young kids.
