= Lance C. Wade =

British World War II flying ace

Lance Cleo Wade
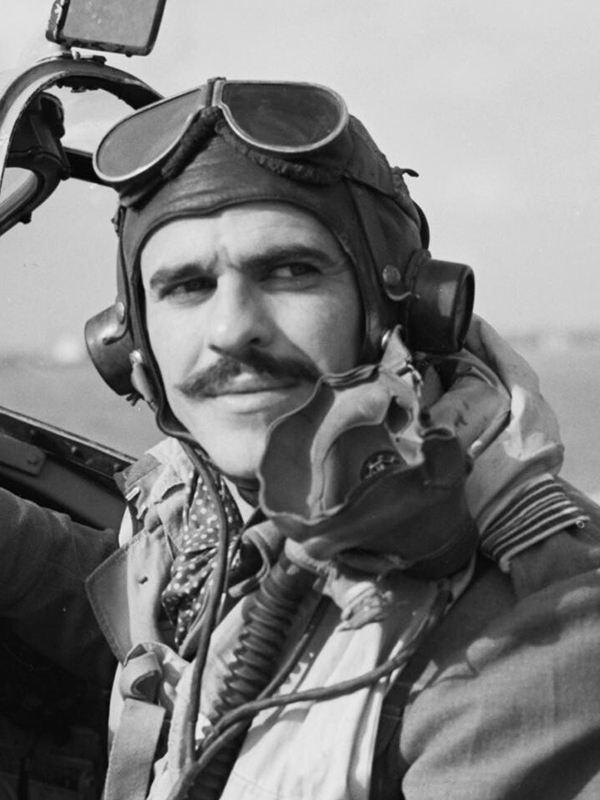
- Lance Wade pictured in the cockpit of his Spitfire Mk VIII, Triolo Airfield, Italy, November 1943
- Born: 18 November 1916; Broaddus, Texas, United States
- Died: 12 January 1944 (aged 27); Foggia, Italy
- Burial place: Cushing, Texas
- Military career
- Allegiance: United Kingdom
- Branch: Royal Air Force
- Service years: 1940–1944
- Rank: Wing Commander
- Nickname: Wildcat
- Service number: 68717
- Units: No. 33 Squadron RAF; No. 145 Squadron RAF
- Conflicts: World War II: Western Desert Campaign; Italian Campaign
- Awards: Distinguished Service Order; Distinguished Flying Cross & Two Bars

Wing Commander Lance Cleo "Wildcat" Wade DSO, DFC & Two Bars (18 November 1916 – 12 January 1944) was an American pilot who joined the Royal Air Force (RAF) during the Second World War and became a flying ace. He remained with RAF until his death in a flying accident in 1944 in Italy. He was described as a "distinguished American fighter ace who epitomized perhaps more than any other American airman the wartime accords between Britain and the United States".

== Early life ==
Wade was born in the small farming community of Broaddus, Texas, on 18 November 1916. He was the second son of Bill and Susan Wade, who named him L.C. (only after the RAF demanded a forename did he call himself Lance Cleo Wade). After the family moved to a farm near Reklaw, Texas, in 1922 he worked on the family farm and attended the local school. He was unable to join the US Army Aviation Cadet Program due to a lack of a college education. He began flying at age 17, at Tucson, Arizona. In 1934, at age 19, Wade joined the Civilian Conservation Corps (CCC) in Arizona.

== Military career ==
He joined the RAF in Canada in December 1940 and trained with No. 52 Operational Training Unit (OTU). Wade was then sent to the British aircraft carrier HMS Ark Royal and flew off her deck in a Hawker Hurricane to reinforce the depleted ranks of aircraft on the island of Malta. He was then sent to Egypt as a Hurricane Mk I pilot in September 1941, and was posted to 33 Squadron. The squadron's mission was to provide close air support for Operation Crusader, the British assault launched on 18 November 1941, against the German Afrika Korps. His first kills were two Fiat CR.42 Falcos on 18 November. He attained the rank of "ace" on 24 November 1941. On 2 December, his Hurricane was damaged by debris from a bomber that he had just shot down. Wade was forced to land 25 miles behind enemy lines, but evaded capture and returned to British lines on foot. He began flying Hurricane Mk IIs in April 1942, and was awarded the Distinguished Flying Cross (DFC). He had 15 aerial victories in September 1942.

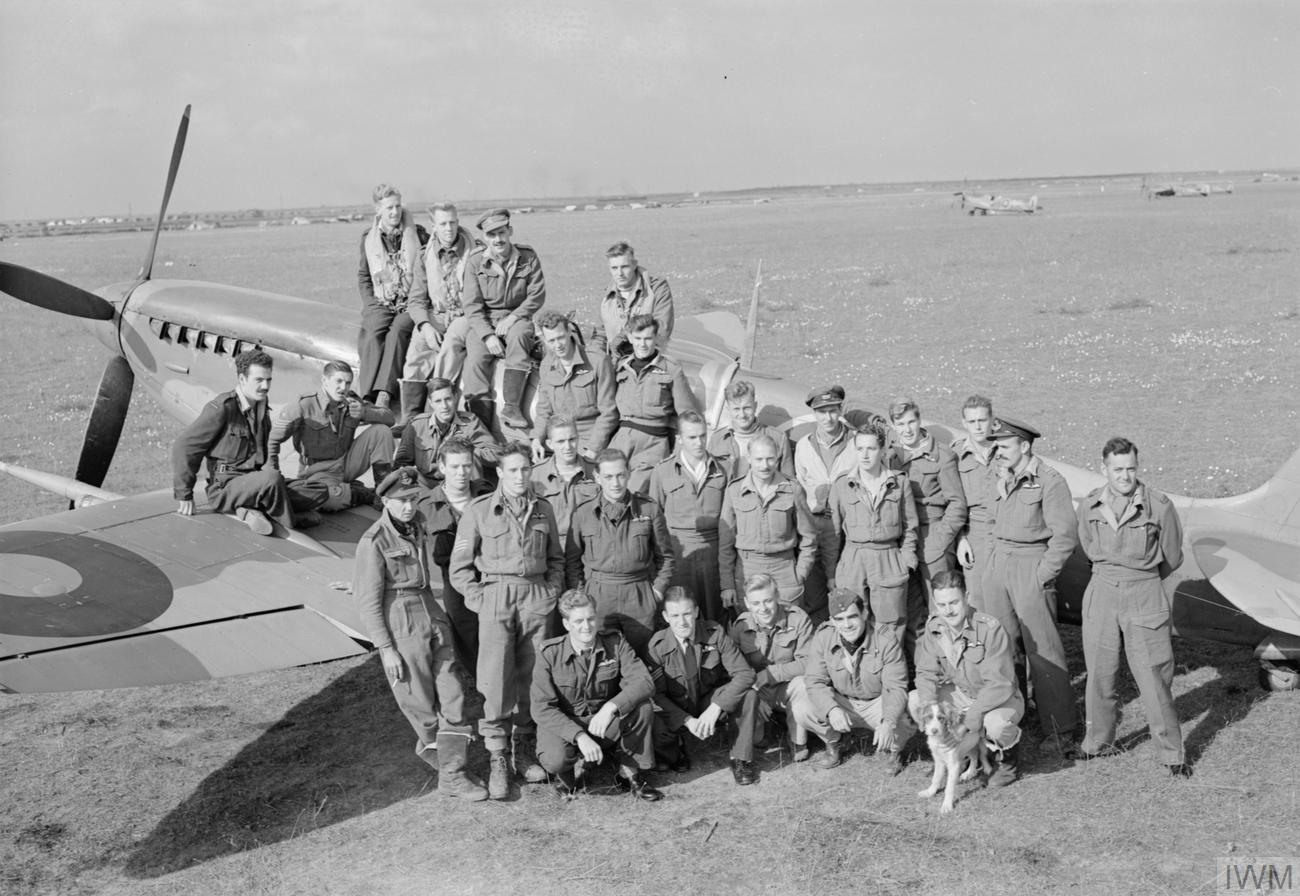
Squadron Leader Wade, second from right, with 145 Squadron pilots at Triolo Airfield, Italy

He spent the next several months back in the US on various RAF projects including evaluating some American fighters at Wright Field. He also sold war bonds, which he disliked. Upon his return to operational duty in the Middle East, Wade reportedly said that this duty was more exhausting than air combat.

He returned to combat as a flight commander in 145 Squadron with a bar to his DFC, flying Supermarine Spitfire Mk Vs. Promoted to squadron leader, he had a busy 60 days, as by the end of April his score was 21, by then flying Spitfire Mk IXs. His squadron moved to Italy, and as a Spitfire VIII pilot he claimed two Focke-Wulf Fw 190s of Schlachtgeschwader 4 on 2 October 1943. His last claims were three Fw 190s (again of SG 4) damaged on 3 November. Wade was promoted to wing commander and joined the staff of the Desert Air Force but was there only briefly, as he was killed in a flying accident on 12 January 1944 at Foggia, Italy.

Wade was credited with 25 aerial victories and was the leading American fighter ace to serve exclusively in any foreign air force. Since he never transferred to the USAAF, or any other American air service, Wade didn't enjoy all of the publicity that some other American aces received and is often overlooked when discussing Historical American Aces.

== Honours and awards ==
- Citation for the award of the Distinguished Flying Cross to Pilot Officer Lance Wade (68717), Royal Air Force Volunteer Reserve, No. 33 Squadron.
- Citation for the award of Bar to the Distinguished Flying Cross to Acting Flight Lieutenant Lance Wade (68717), Royal Air Force Volunteer Reserve, No. 33 Squadron.

Since being awarded the Distinguished Flying Cross this officer has destroyed 7 enemy aircraft thus bring his total victories to 15. In September, 1942, during a reconnaissance patrol his aircraft was attacked by some 8 Italian fighters. Flight Lieutenant Wade, however, fought them off. By his skill and determination he contributed materially to the success of the reconnaissance and much valuable information was obtained. Flight Lieutenant Wade's courage and devotion to duty has been an inspiration to all.

- Citation for the award of a second Bar to the Distinguished Flying Cross to Acting Squadron Leader Lance Wade (68717), Royal Air Force Volunteer Reserve, No. 145 Squadron.

the leader of a squadron which has achieved much success in recent operations. During March, 1943, the squadron destroyed 21 enemy aircraft, 4 of which were shot down by Squadron Leader Wade. By his great skill and daring, this officer has contributed materially to the high standard of operational efficiency of the squadron he commands. Squadron Leader Wade has destroyed 19 enemy aircraft.

- Citation for the award of the Distinguished Service Order to Wing Commander Lance Wade DFC (68717), Royal Air Force Volunteer Reserve, No. 33 Squadron.
