= Chireno Independent School District =

School district in Texas

Chireno Independent School District is a public school district based in Chireno, Texas (USA).

The district is located in east central Nacogdoches County and extends into a small portion of San Augustine County.

Chireno ISD has two campuses: Chireno Jr High and High School (Grades 9–12) and Chireno Elementary (Grades PK–8).

In 2009, the school district was rated "recognized" by the Texas Education Agency.
