= University of San Augustine (Texas) =

University of San Augustine was a college located in Texas on June 5, 1837. It was located in San Augustine, Texas. It was granted its charter in 1837. Attendance rose to 150 students but dropped to 50. As a result of a rivalry between itself and Wesleyan College, both schools closed down. In 1847 effort was made to merge both school and form the University of Eastern Texas. These efforts failed and all failed in 1851.

== Notable people ==
Elisha Roberts (Trustee)
