= Gary Brewer's deck house =

Decorated house

Coordinates: 31°31′46.9″N 94°6′43.2″W

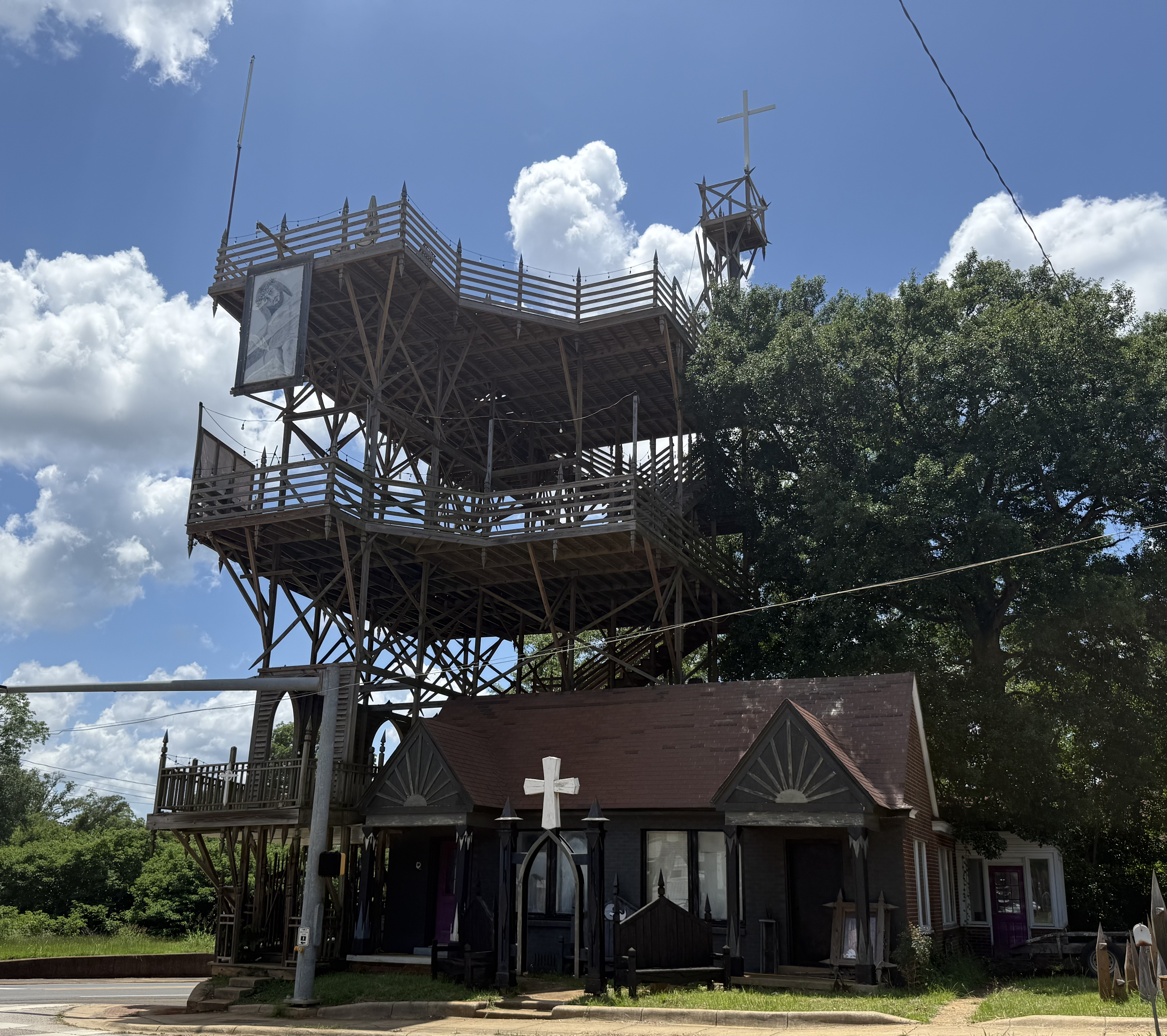
The house in June

Carpenter and artist Gary Brewer's house in San Augustine, Texas has been modified by its owner with the addition of three stories of decks stretching 56 feet in the air. It is positioned directly next to the architecturally conservative San Augustine commercial district, and across the street from the San Augustine County Courthouse. It presents in a Gothic style and is adorned with religious imagery, like crosses and a portrait of Jesus, although its creator denies taking influence from anything in particular.

Statues, sculptures, and paintings also made by Brewer are displayed on and around the house.

== History and regulation ==
Brewer had been an ironworker before he moved to the San Augustine area, afterwards becoming a carpenter. In 2006 he moved into the house in San Augustine and began to plan the structure after building the first deck for his hot tub. The plan then called for the structure culminating in a steeple topping at 70 feet high.

In 2019, fearing further expansions, San Augustine introduced a height limit ordinance to prevent his building from eclipsing the courthouse. The ordinance prevents buildings from going above 35 feet and for structures taller to require an architect's approval. Despite controversy in the town, with criticism including its domination of the landscape and allegations of Satanism, further expansions were subsequently approved, after which the highest point of the structure, the crow's nest, was added. Brewer sees his building as a sign of an improving San Augustine, which has been portrayed negatively in popular culture.

== Gallery ==
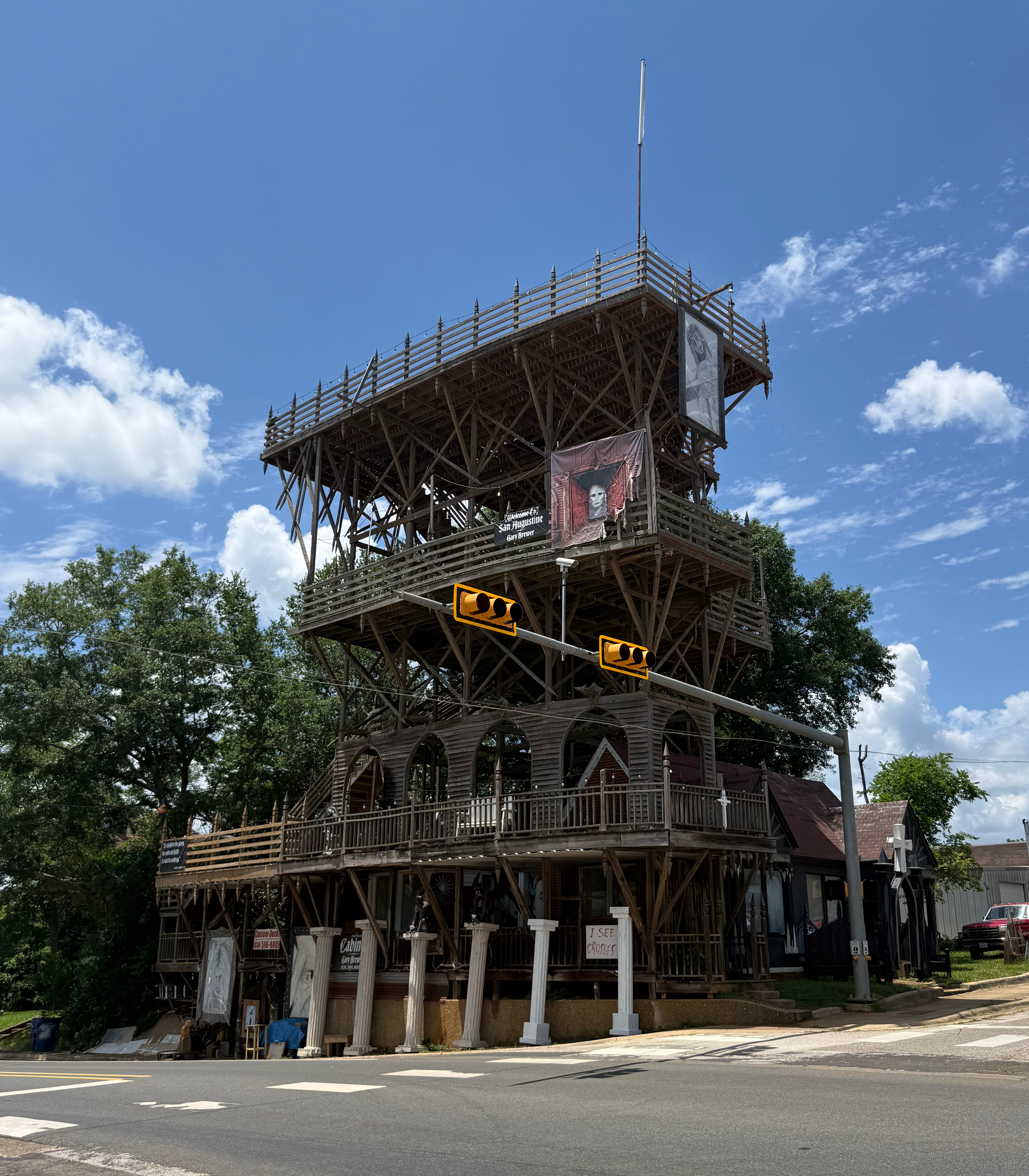
Gary Brewer's Deck House from West Main

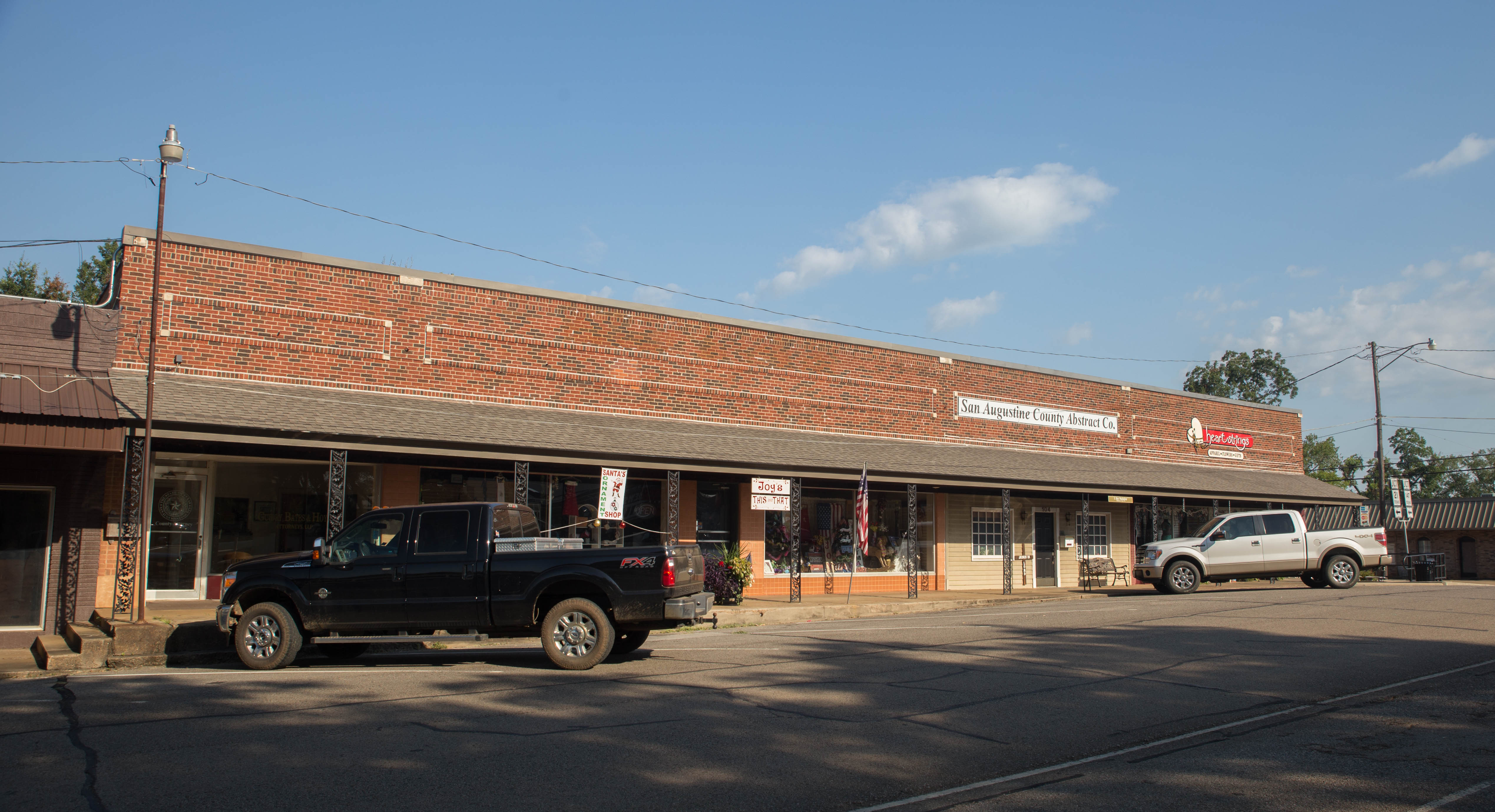
Commercial buildings next to the house
