= Broaddus (surname) =

Broaddus is an English surname of multiple possible origins. Notable people with the surname include:

- Andrew Broaddus (1900–1972), American politician from Kentucky
- Andrew Broaddus (Virginia politician) (died 1898), American politician from Virginia
- Bower Slack Broaddus (1888–1949), American judge and politician from Oklahoma
- J. Alfred Broaddus (1939–2025) American banker from Virginia
- Maurice Broaddus (fl. 2022), American author
- William Broaddus (born 1942), American politician and lawyer from Virginia

== See also ==
- Broadus (name)
