= John A. Ramsey =

American businessman and political figure

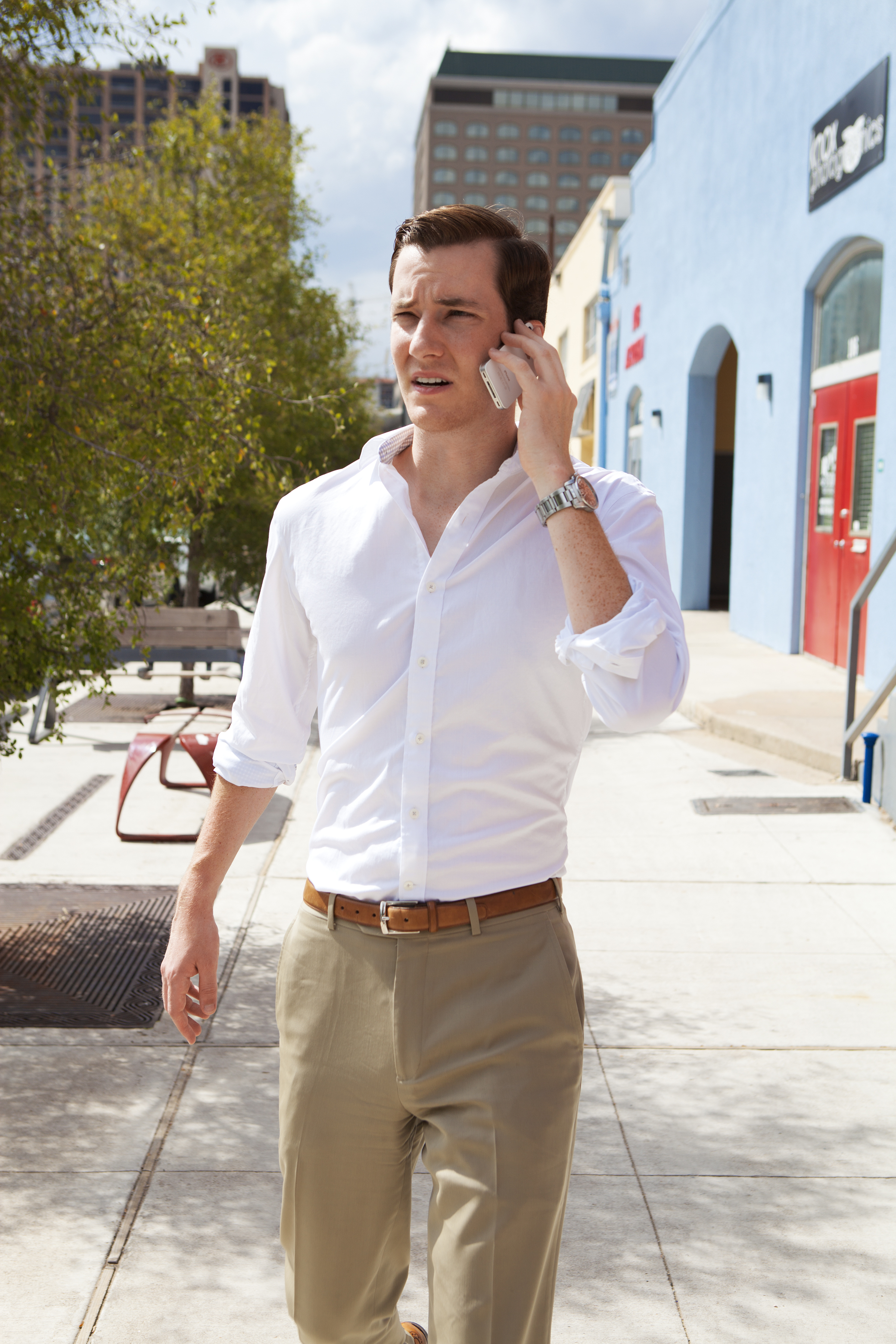
- Education: Stephen F. Austin State University
- Occupation: Venture Capital
- Known for: Founder and Chairman of Liberty for All Action Fund

John Ramsey is an American businessman and libertarian political figure. He is the founder and chairman of the Liberty for All Super PAC.

== Early life ==
Ramsey grew up in rural East Texas near the Louisiana border. His family owns a timber farm and community bank near San Augustine, Texas, as well as other agricultural interests in central and west Texas. His parents were both social workers who worked for Child Protective Services.

His grandfather, Justin Robert Howard, an American officer in World War II, banker, rancher, and antique firearm collector, mentored Ramsey in business and finance. Howard died on Thanksgiving 2010, leaving an inheritance to Ramsey and his two siblings.

Ramsey's mother, Susan, died from breast cancer when he was 12.

=== College ===
Ramsey graduated from Stephen F. Austin State University with degrees in business economics and finance. His grandfather was a member of the Stephen F. Austin State University Alumni Association Hall of Fame. While in college, Ramsey served as the energy sector advisor for the Mast Student Investment Roundtable, which exists to provide finance students with experience in managing equity portfolios. In 2011, he attended a study-abroad program at Oxford University in England, where he advocated libertarianism and the exit of Great Britain from the European Union.

Ramsey became a libertarian while in college and worked for Ron Paul's 2012 presidential campaign in Iowa and Maine.

== Career ==
=== Liberty for All ===
Ramsey founded the Liberty for All Super PAC in 2012 with an initial investment of $890,000 of his own money. According to Federal Election Commission records, Liberty for All became official on March 5, 2012. The PAC was founded with the goal of supporting libertarian-minded, independent-leaning candidates who could win in the two major parties, viewing the RNC and DNC as models.

During the May 2012 Kentucky Republican primary election, Liberty for All spent over $700,000 in independent expenditures for congressional candidate Thomas Massie. The group also supported Republican Congressmen Justin Amash, Kerry Bentivolio and Jeff Flake. Liberty for All reportedly spent a total of $3.1 million in the 2012 cycle, with over 90 percent of backed candidates winning.

In addition to his activity on the national level, Ramsey is politically active around the Austin and Travis County area. In 2012, Ramsey supported Michael Cargill for Travis County Constable. Cargill is a gay African-American gun store owner and prominent libertarian activist in Austin. The race marked Ramsey's first attempt to elect a libertarian leaning candidate in the Democratic party. The race also became prominent for Ramsey's role in labeling Cargill's opponent Adan Ballesteros as the "Cocaine Constable". The attacks against Ballesteros were based on the findings of a 15-year-old investigation by the Department of Public Safety that said Ballesteros had peddled drugs into the United States from Mexico.

In 2012, Ramsey donated $10,000 to Austinites for Geographic Representation (AGR). AGR was the main proponent of Proposition 3, which established single member districts for the Austin city council elections. Ramsey was also a financial backer and fundraising bundler for the 2012 marijuana legalization efforts in Colorado. Ramsey has since been involved in marijuana decriminalization efforts in states such as Maine and Washington.

For the 2014 elections, Ramsey invested in state legislative races in early presidential primary states hoping to start the careers of libertarian politicians who could run for higher offices in the future. In 2016, Ramsey and Liberty for All deployed resources to defeat a food tax in Fairfax county Virginia.

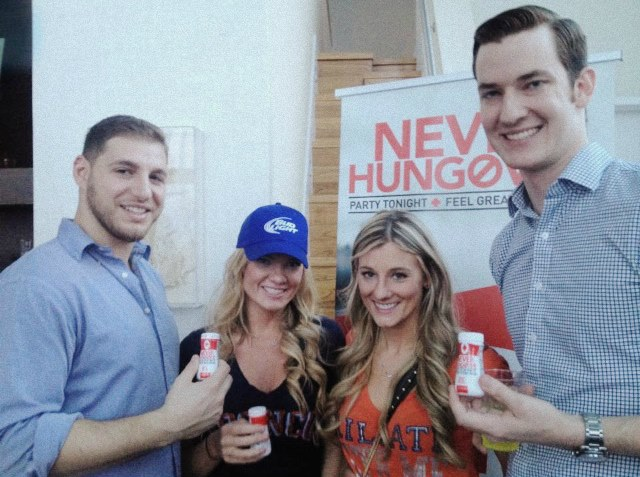
Ramsey and Benefico at a 2014 Never Hungover launch party held at Phil Maloof's luxury suite atop the Palms Casino and resort in Las Vegas.

=== Other endeavors ===
Ramsey is an investor in the hangover preventative Never Hungover. According to Never Hungover CEO Parrish Whitaker, Ramsey contributed to the overall vision of the company.

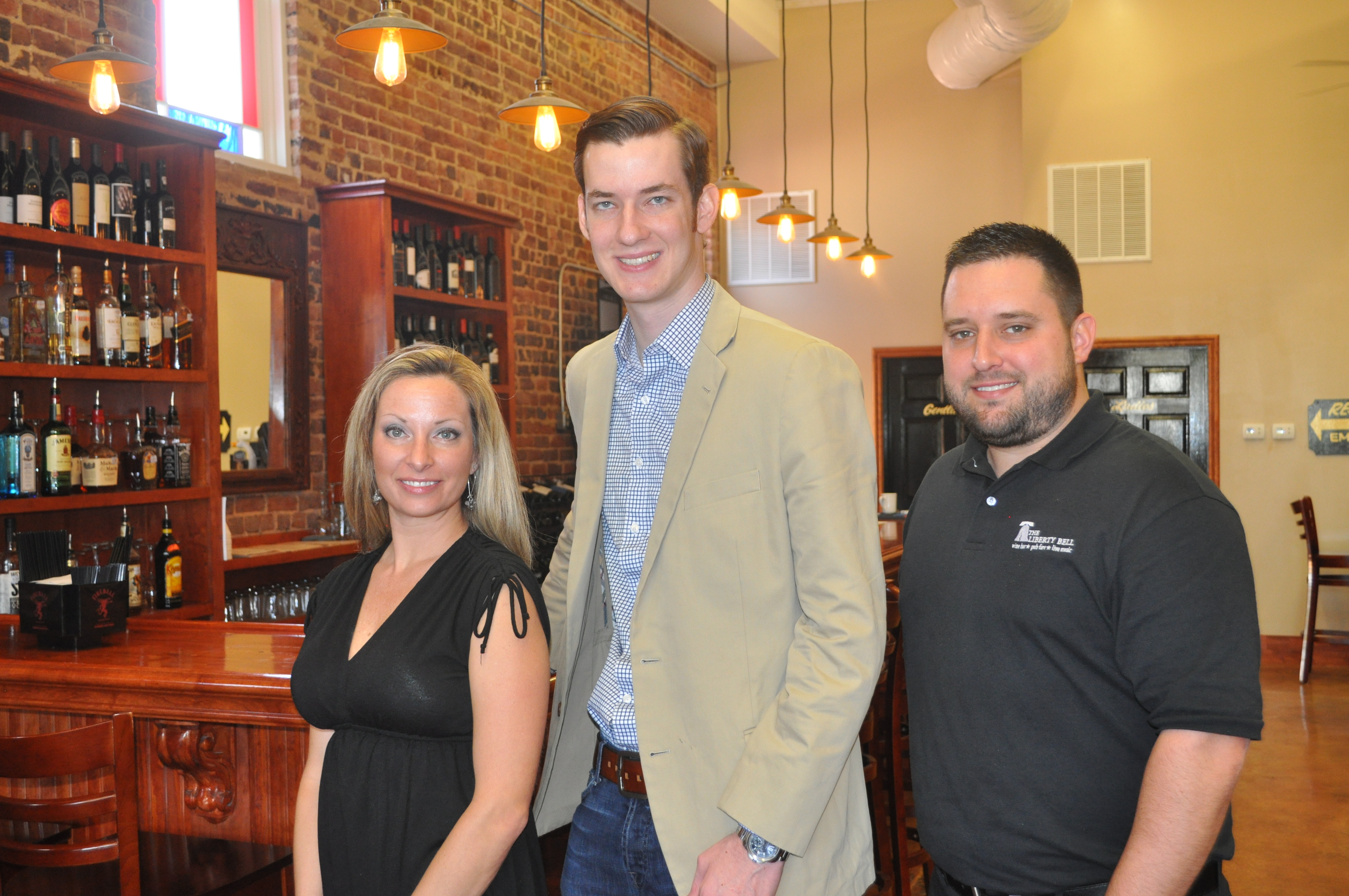
Ramsey and the Harrises inside The Liberty Bell

In early 2013, Ramsey partnered with Grant and Kati Harris to open a wine bar named the Liberty Bell in Nacogdoches, Texas. The Liberty Bell has a sandwich named after Nacogdoches native and professional soccer player Clint Dempsey, the "Dempsey FC."

Ramsey is the founder and CEO of the early-stage tech, SAAS, and consumer packaged-good investment firm Seedcess Investment Group. He is also involved with Praxis, an alternative higher education company that teaches entrepreneurship through real-world career experience. Additionally, he co-manages JPW Equity, an investment fund that focuses its efforts on commercial storage and US-based nutritional supplement manufacturing.

Ramsey is a critic of central banking systems and was an early investor in Bitcoin. In addition to trading activity, Ramsey has invested in several cryptocurrency mining operations. Ramsey is an advanced tennis player and early investor in MyTennislessons.com, the largest online marketplace for tennis instruction.

== Personal ==
Ramsey has an organic garden at his residence in Austin. Each year upon harvest, Ramsey opens his home to the public for an educational seminar and charitable food drive that is hosted by the Center For Natural Living.

Ramsey is a devout Christian and regularly speaks at conferences, religious institutions, and politically affiliated organizations around the country about libertarianism. Frederic Bastiat, Roger Federer, Ludwig Von Mises, Samuel B. Fuller, George Strait, Milton Friedman, Leo Tolstoy, Ross Perot, Roger Staubach, and Jerry Jones are among Ramsey's influences.
