= Black Ankle, Texas =

- Unincorporated community
- Location within the state of Texas Black Ankle, Texas (the United States)
- Coordinates: 31°31′26″N 94°0′17″W
- Country: United States
- State: Texas
- County: San Augustine
- Elevation: 384 ft (117 m)
- Time zone: UTC-6 (Central (CST))
  - Summer (DST): UTC-6 (CDT)
- GNIS feature ID: 1381441

Black Ankle is an unincorporated community in San Augustine County, Texas, United States.

According to tradition, Black Ankle was so named when a woman covered an inconvenient hole in her black stocking with soot. Little remains of the original town.
