= Broaddus, Texas =

- Town
- Interactive map of Broaddus, Texas
- Coordinates: 31°18′18″N 94°16′12″W
- Country: United States
- State: Texas
- County: San Augustine

Area
  - Total: 0.37 sq mi (0.97 km^{2})
  - Land: 0.37 sq mi (0.97 km^{2})
  - Water: 0 sq mi (0.00 km^{2})
- Elevation: 246 ft (75 m)

Population (2020)
  - Total: 184
  - Density: 490/sq mi (190/km^{2})
- Time zone: UTC-6 (Central (CST))
  - Summer (DST): UTC-5 (CDT)
- ZIP code: 75929
- Area code: 936
- FIPS code: 48-10384
- GNIS feature ID: 2411727
- Website: broaddus.municipalimpact.com

Broaddus (/ˈbrɔːdəs/ BRAW-dəs) is a town in San Augustine County, Texas, United States. The population was 184 at the 2020 census.

== Geography ==
According to the United States Census Bureau, the town has a total area of 0.4 square miles (1.0 km^{2}), all land.

=== Climate ===
The climate in this area is characterized by hot, humid summers and generally mild to cool winters. According to the Köppen Climate Classification system, Broaddus has a humid subtropical climate, abbreviated "Cfa" on climate maps.

== Demographics ==
Historical population
Census	Pop.	Note	%±
1980	225		—
1990	212		−5.8%
2000	189		−10.8%
2010	207		9.5%
2020	184		−11.1%
U.S. Decennial Census; 2020 Census

As of the census of 2000, there were 189 people, 82 households, and 47 families residing in the town. The population density was 501.4 inhabitants per square mile (193.6/km^{2}). There were 103 housing units at an average density of 273.3 per square mile (105.5/km^{2}). The racial makeup of the town was 99.47% White, and 0.53% from two or more races. Hispanic or Latino of any race were 2.12% of the population.

In 2000, 26.8% of households in Broaddus had children under the age of 18, 45.1% consisted of married couples living together, 9.8% had a female householder with no husband present, and 41.5% were non-families. 41.5% of all households were made up of individuals, and 25.6% had someone living alone who was 65 years of age or older. The average household size was 2.30 and the average family size was 3.21. The population was spread out, with 29.1% under the age of 18, 6.9% from 18 to 24, 24.3% from 25 to 44, 16.4% from 45 to 64, and 23.3% who were 65 years of age or older. The median age was 35 years. For every 100 females, there were 94.8 males. For every 100 females age 18 and over, there were 91.4 males.

The median income for a household in the town was $17,250, and the median income for a family was $25,625. Males had a median income of $28,929 versus $0 for females. The per capita income for the town was $11,765. About 18.6% of families and 18.6% of the population were below the poverty line, including 8.3% of those under the age of eighteen and 13.3% of those 65 or over.

== Education ==
The Town of Broaddus is served by the Broaddus Independent School District and is home to the Broaddus High School Bulldogs.

== Notable people ==
- Terry Teagle, NBA player
- Lt. Col. Lance C. "Wildcat" Wade, World War II ace with the RAF
