= Broaddus High School =

Location
- 16405 State Hwy 147; Broaddus, Texas 75929-0058; United States

Information
- School type: Public high school
- School district: Broaddus Independent School District
- Principal: Kim Holloway
- Staff: 38.09 (FTE)
- Grades: 6-12
- Enrollment: 391 (2023–2024)
- Student to teacher ratio: 10.27
- Colors: Blue & White
- Athletics conference: UIL Class A
- Mascot: Bulldog
- Website: Broaddus ISD

Broaddus High School is a public secondary school located in the town of Broaddus, Texas, USA and classified as a 1A school by the UIL. It is a part of the Broaddus Independent School District located in southwestern San Augustine County. In 2015, the school was rated "Met Standard" by the Texas Education Agency.

== Athletics ==
The Broaddus Bulldogs compete in these sports -

Cross Country, Basketball, Track, Baseball & Softball

=== State titles ===
- Boys Basketball
  - 1976(1A), 1977(1A)
- Girls Basketball
  - 2025(1A/D1), 2026(1A/D1)
