= Broaddus, Virginia =

Unincorporated community in Virginia, United States

Coordinates: 38°04′02″N 77°17′43″W

Broaddus is an unincorporated community in Caroline County, in the U.S. state of Virginia.
