= Broadus (name) =

Broadus is a surname and given name of English and Welsh origins, a variant of Broaddus. Notable people with the surname include:

== Surname ==
- Bruce Edward Broadus (1966–1996), American R&B singer and songwriter of the group Damian Dame
- Snoop Dogg (born Calvin Cordozar Broadus Jr. in 1971), American rapper
- John Albert Broadus (1827–1895), American Baptist pastor
- Kevin Broadus (born 1964), head men's basketball coach at Binghamton University

== Given name ==
- John Broadus Watson (1878–1958), American psychologist
- Broadus Erle (1918–1977), American violinist

== Fictional characters ==
- Bodie Broadus, character on the television drama The Wire
