= San Augustine Independent School District =

School district in Texas

San Augustine Independent School District is a public school district based in San Augustine, Texas (USA).

The district serves northern and eastern San Augustine County and extends into a small portion of Shelby County.

In 2009, the school district was rated "academically acceptable" by the Texas Education Agency.

== Schools ==
- San Augustine High (Grades 9-12)
- San Augustine Intermediate (Grades 5-8)
- San Augustine Elementary (Grades PK-4)
- Accelerated Learning Center (Alternative Campus; Grades 9-12)
