= San Augustine, Texas =

City in and county seat of San Augustine County, Texas, United States

- City
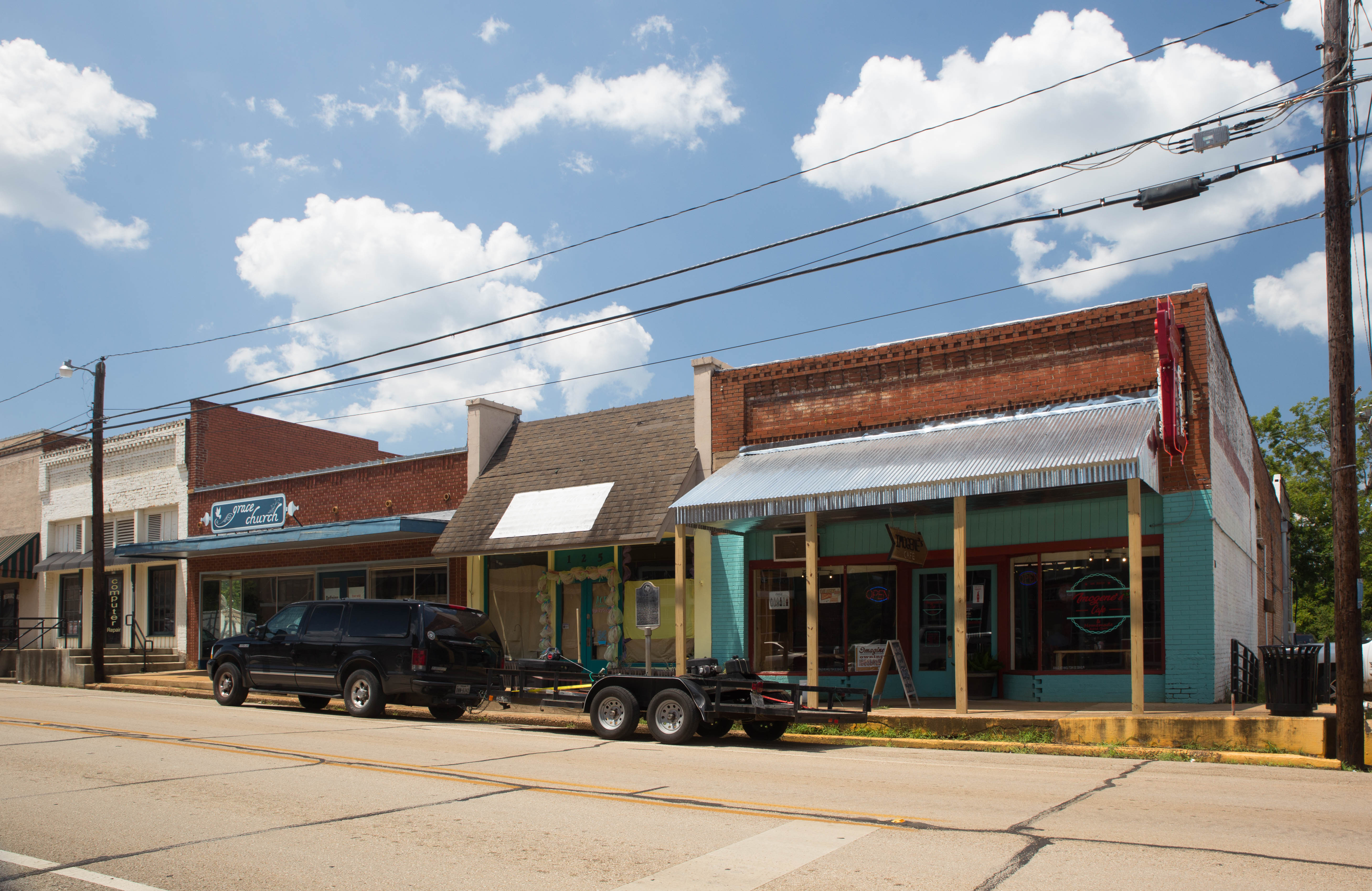
- Imogene Cafe in downtown San Augustine

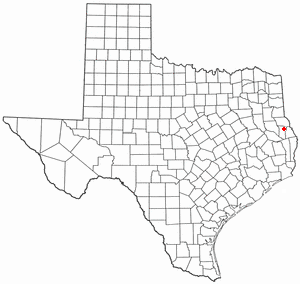
- Location of San Augustine, Texas

- Coordinates: 31°31′48″N 94°06′41″W
- Country: United States
- State: Texas
- County: San Augustine

Area
  - Total: 4.80 sq mi (12.44 km^{2})
  - Land: 4.72 sq mi (12.22 km^{2})
  - Water: 0.089 sq mi (0.23 km^{2})
- Elevation: 345 ft (105 m)

Population (2020)
  - Total: 1,920
  - Density: 400.2/sq mi (154.53/km^{2})
- Time zone: UTC-6 (Central (CST))
  - Summer (DST): UTC-5 (CDT)
- ZIP code: 75972
- Area code: 936
- FIPS code: 48-65024
- GNIS feature ID: 2411775
- Website: City website

San Augustine is the county seat of San Augustine County in East Texas, United States. Its population was 1,920 at the 2020 census.

== History ==
The first European settlement in the area began in 1717 with the establishment of Mission Nuestra Señora de los Dolores de los Ais by Spanish missionaries. The mission was abandoned and re-established in 1721. It lasted until 1773 and is now preserved as Mission Dolores State Historic Site.

Before the establishment of the town, a small number of residents lived in the Ayish Bayou area. They had briefly fled during the Fredonian Rebellion in 1822 to escape Mexican forces. The town was established in 1832 under alcalde William McFarland by the site of the mission, then owned by Thomas S. McFarland. The town was named after the Presidio de San Agustín de Ahumada, which had been named in honor of the (1755–1761) Viceroy of New Spain, Don Agustín de Ahumada y Villalón. McFarland laid out a grid of 356 plots, making it the first town laid out in the Anglo-American style rather than the Spanish one.

In 1832, residents sent men to fight in the Battle of Nacogdoches. They elected Sam Houston as delegate for the Convention of 1833. They again fled from Mexican forces during the Texas Revolution, during the Runaway Scrape. After the end of the war, San Augustine was made seat of San Augustine County. Methodist, Presbyterian, and Methodist Episcopal churches were established. Its Presbyterian church was the first Protestant church in Texas, established in 1839. Three universities were established, the University of San Augustine, the Wesleyan College, and the University of Eastern Texas, all of which shut down within a few years of their founding.

Three companies of soldiers were sent from the city during the Civil War.

Cotton and lumber were major industries in the town's early history, with railroad expansions allowing for industrial sawmill operations. The lumber industry largely left the town in the Great Depression, but returned later. The town's location in the Piney Woods make it an excellent lumber area.

Newspapers published in the town began with the San Augustine Red-Lander, and continued with the San Augustine Rambler, the Cotton Belt News, the Saxon, the Herald, and the still-publishing San Augustine Tribune.

== Geography ==
San Augustine is located at 31°31′52″N 94°06′39″W (31.531086, –94.110971).

According to the United States Census Bureau, the city has a total area of 4.8 square miles (12 km^{2}), of which 0.1 square miles (0.26 km^{2}) (2.08%) is covered by water.

=== Climate ===
The climate in this area is characterized by hot, humid summers and generally mild to cool winters. According to the Köppen climate classification, San Augustine has a humid subtropical climate, Cfa on climate maps.

Climate data for San Augustine, Texas (1991–2020 normals, extremes 1909–1917, 2000–present)
Month	Jan	Feb	Mar	Apr	May	Jun	Jul	Aug	Sep	Oct	Nov	Dec	Year
Record high °F (°C)	83 (28)	85 (29)	95 (35)	93 (34)	98 (37)	104 (40)	105 (41)	112 (44)	108 (42)	97 (36)	89 (32)	90 (32)	112 (44)
Mean daily maximum °F (°C)	59.5 (15.3)	63.2 (17.3)	70.2 (21.2)	76.9 (24.9)	84.0 (28.9)	90.3 (32.4)	93.5 (34.2)	94.4 (34.7)	88.5 (31.4)	79.5 (26.4)	69.7 (20.9)	61.0 (16.1)	77.6 (25.3)
Daily mean °F (°C)	47.4 (8.6)	51.1 (10.6)	57.7 (14.3)	64.7 (18.2)	72.5 (22.5)	79.0 (26.1)	82.0 (27.8)	82.1 (27.8)	76.4 (24.7)	66.5 (19.2)	56.6 (13.7)	48.8 (9.3)	65.4 (18.6)
Mean daily minimum °F (°C)	35.4 (1.9)	39.0 (3.9)	45.3 (7.4)	52.5 (11.4)	60.9 (16.1)	67.7 (19.8)	70.4 (21.3)	69.9 (21.1)	64.3 (17.9)	53.4 (11.9)	43.5 (6.4)	36.5 (2.5)	53.2 (11.8)
Record low °F (°C)	7 (−14)	1 (−17)	17 (−8)	22 (−6)	35 (2)	50 (10)	57 (14)	56 (13)	38 (3)	22 (−6)	14 (−10)	8 (−13)	1 (−17)
Average precipitation inches (mm)	4.95 (126)	5.11 (130)	5.22 (133)	4.65 (118)	4.30 (109)	4.80 (122)	3.22 (82)	4.28 (109)	4.18 (106)	4.75 (121)	4.70 (119)	5.40 (137)	55.56 (1,411)
Average snowfall inches (cm)	0.1 (0.25)	0.1 (0.25)	0.0 (0.0)	0.0 (0.0)	0.0 (0.0)	0.0 (0.0)	0.0 (0.0)	0.0 (0.0)	0.0 (0.0)	0.0 (0.0)	0.0 (0.0)	0.0 (0.0)	0.2 (0.51)
Average precipitation days (≥ 0.01 in)	9.2	8.4	8.0	7.1	7.3	8.2	7.0	6.5	6.3	6.0	7.6	8.9	90.5
Average snowy days (≥ 0.1 in)	0.1	0.1	0.0	0.0	0.0	0.0	0.0	0.0	0.0	0.0	0.0	0.0	0.2
Source: NOAA

== Demographics ==
Historical population
Census	Pop.	Note	%±
1870	250		—
1880	503		101.2%
1890	744		47.9%
1900	261		−64.9%
1910	1,204		361.3%
1920	1,268		5.3%
1930	1,247		−1.7%
1940	1,516		21.6%
1950	2,510		65.6%
1960	2,584		2.9%
1970	2,539		−1.7%
1980	2,930		15.4%
1990	2,337		−20.2%
2000	2,475		5.9%
2010	2,108		−14.8%
2020	1,920		−8.9%
U.S. Decennial Census

=== Racial and ethnic composition ===
San Augustine city, Texas – Racial and ethnic composition Note: the US Census treats Hispanic/Latino as an ethnic category. This table excludes Latinos from the racial categories and assigns them to a separate category. Hispanics/Latinos may be of any race.
Race / Ethnicity (NH = Non-Hispanic)	Pop 2000	Pop 2010	Pop 2020	% 2000	% 2010	% 2020
White alone (NH)	894	767	629	36.12%	36.39%	32.76%
Black or African American alone (NH)	1,430	1,092	968	57.78%	51.80%	50.42%
Native American or Alaska Native alone (NH)	2	1	0	0.08%	0.05%	0.00%
Asian alone (NH)	17	9	13	0.69%	0.43%	0.68%
Native Hawaiian or Pacific Islander alone (NH)	0	0	0	0.00%	0.00%	0.00%
Other race alone (NH)	0	5	0	0.00%	0.24%	0.00%
Mixed race or Multiracial (NH)	5	13	38	0.20%	0.62%	1.98%
Hispanic or Latino (any race)	127	221	272	5.13%	10.48%	14.17%
Total	2,475	2,108	1,920	100.00%	100.00%	100.00%

=== 2020 census ===
As of the 2020 census, 1,920 people, 741 households, and 536 families resided in the city, the median age was 42.2 years, 23.6% of residents were under the age of 18, and 23.0% were 65 years of age or older.

For every 100 females there were 89.0 males, and for every 100 females age 18 and over there were 87.7 males age 18 and over.

0.0% of residents lived in urban areas, while 100.0% lived in rural areas.

There were 741 households in San Augustine, of which 33.5% had children under the age of 18 living in them. Of all households, 34.5% were married-couple households, 18.9% were households with a male householder and no spouse or partner present, and 40.5% were households with a female householder and no spouse or partner present. About 33.2% of all households were made up of individuals and 15.3% had someone living alone who was 65 years of age or older.

There were 935 housing units, of which 20.7% were vacant. The homeowner vacancy rate was 1.9% and the rental vacancy rate was 5.4%.

Racial composition as of the 2020 census
Race	Number	Percent
White	661	34.4%
Black or African American	970	50.5%
American Indian and Alaska Native	3	0.2%
Asian	15	0.8%
Native Hawaiian and Other Pacific Islander	0	0.0%
Some other race	136	7.1%
Two or more races	135	7.0%

=== 2000 census ===
As of the census of 2000, 2,475 people, 859 households, and 573 families were living in the city. The population density was 525.2 inhabitants per square mile (202.8/km^{2}). The 1,076 housing units had an average density of 228.3 per square mile (88.1/km^{2}). The racial makeup of the city was 37.82% White, 57.94% African American, 0.08% Native American, 0.69% Asian, 3.07% from other races, and 0.40% from two or more races. Hispanics or Latino of any race were 5.13% of the population.

Of the 859 households, 29.8% had children under 18 living with them, 37.3% were married couples living together, 26.0% had a female householder with no husband present, and 33.2% were not families. About 30.5% of all households were made up of individuals, and 17.0% had someone living alone who was 65 or older. The average household size was 2.57 and the average family size was 3.23. The age distribution was 26.9% under 18, 8.1% from 18 to 24, 22.6% from 25 to 44, 19.7% from 45 to 64, and 22.7% who were 65 or older. The median age was 38 years. For every 100 females, there were 80.4 males. For every 100 females 18 and over, there were 67.6 males.

The median income for a household in the city was $25,489, and for a family was $33,203. Males had a median income of $23,750 versus $17,628 for females. The per capita income for the city was $14,918. About 19.1% of families and 24.7% of the population were below the poverty line, including 35.0% of those under age 18 and 30.7% of those age 65 or over.

== Education ==
The city of San Augustine is served by the San Augustine Independent School District. The city was once home to the University of San Augustine (Texas)

== Notable people ==
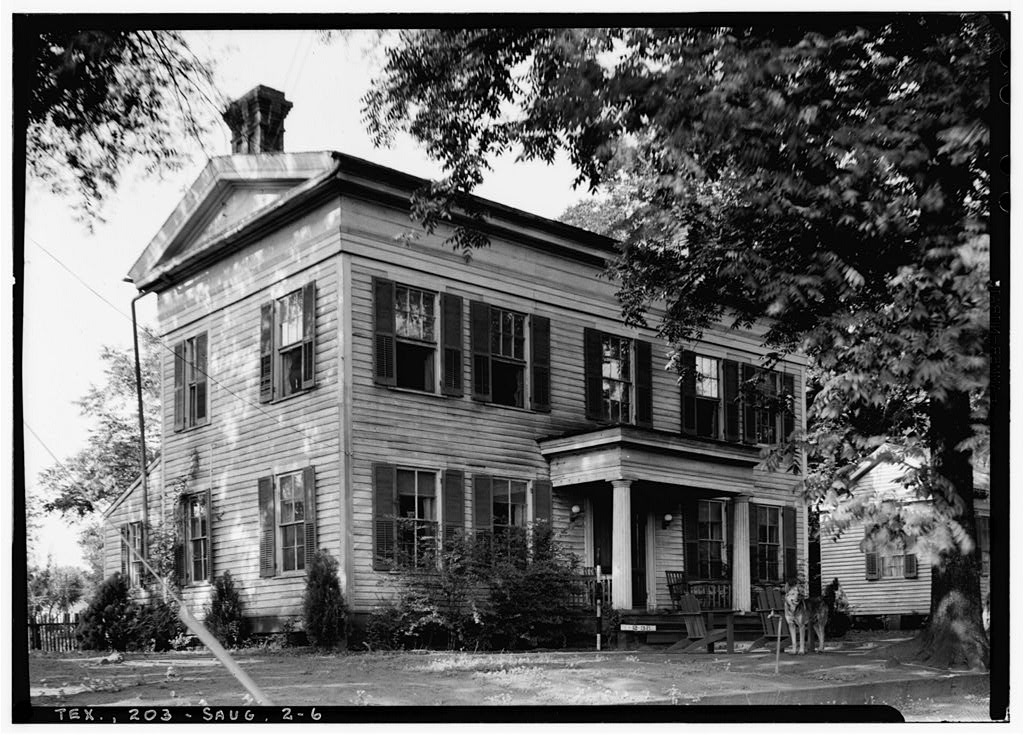
Matthew Cartwright House, April 2012

- Kenneth Lewis Anderson, The last vice president of the Republic of Texas
- Edward A. Clark, U.S. ambassador to Australia
- Dominique Edison, Seattle Seahawks wide receiver
- Joseph Barton Elam, U.S. representative from Louisiana's 4th congressional district from 1877 to 1881
- John A. Greer, lieutenant governor of Texas
- Frances Cox Henderson, wife of Governor Henderson, helped establish Episcopal Church in San Augustine
- J. Pinckney Henderson, the first governor of the State of Texas
- Sam Houston, the first president of the Republic of Texas
- Kenneth M. Hoyt, U.S. district judge
- Memucan Hunt, Jr., secretary of the Navy of the Republic of Texas and Texas' minister to the United States
- Ben Ramsey, Texas lieutenant governor
- John A. Ramsey, prominent libertarian entrepreneur and philanthropist
- Oran M. Roberts, governor
- Franklin Barlow Sexton, Texas senator, grand commander of the Knights Templar of Texas

== Photo gallery ==
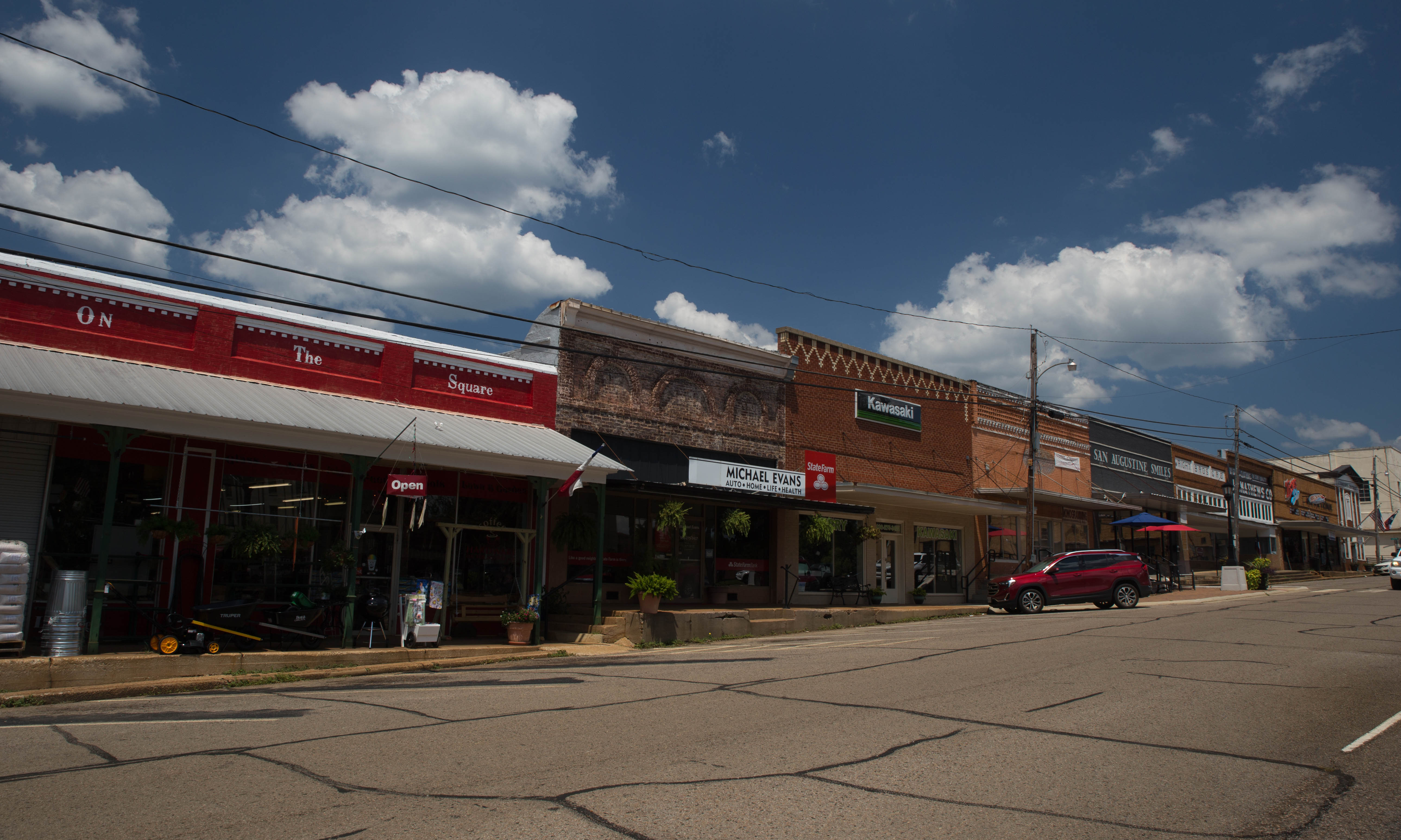
Retail stores in Historic Commercial District

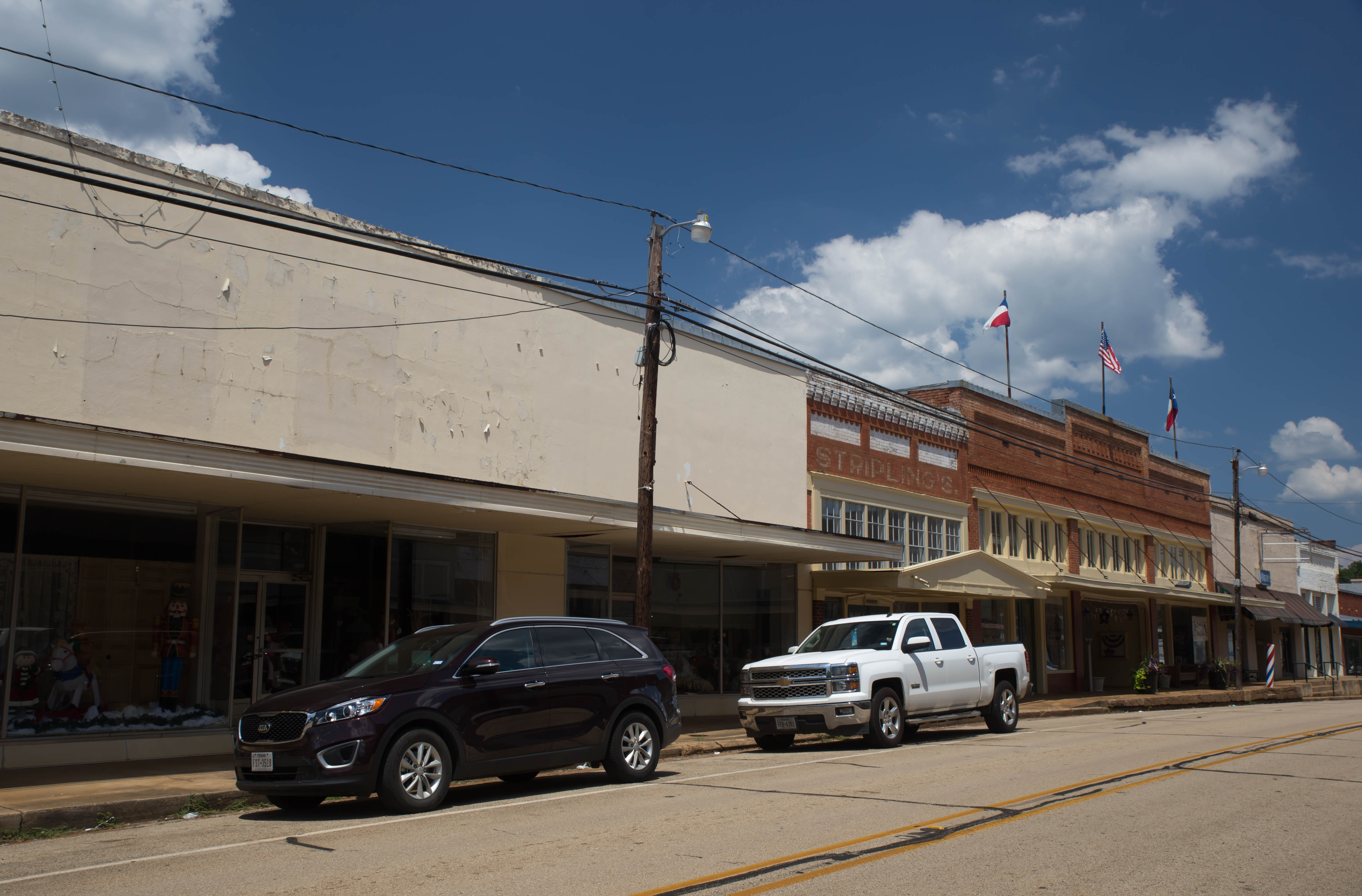
Angus Theater

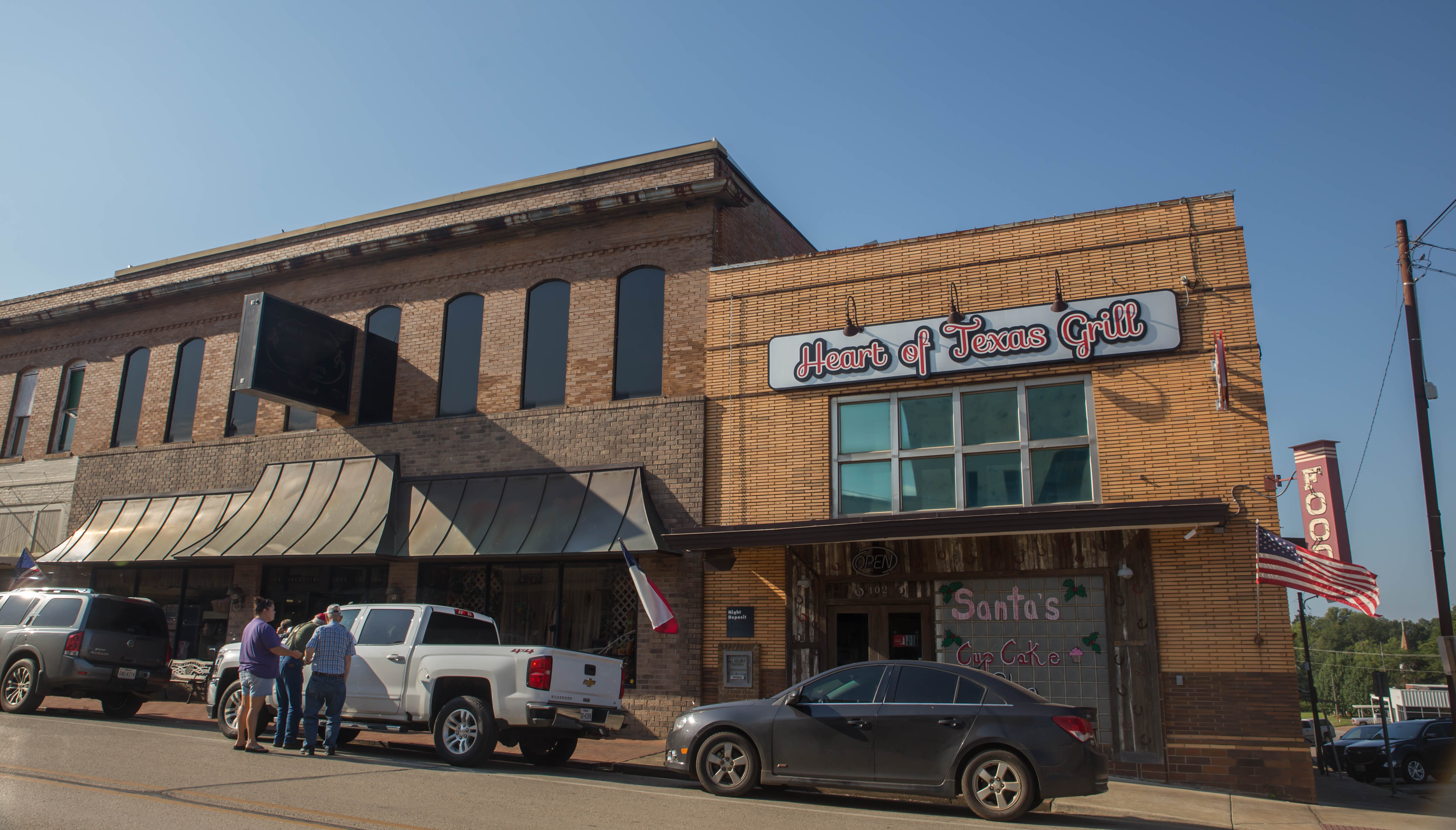
San Augustine Drug Store and Heart of Texas Grill

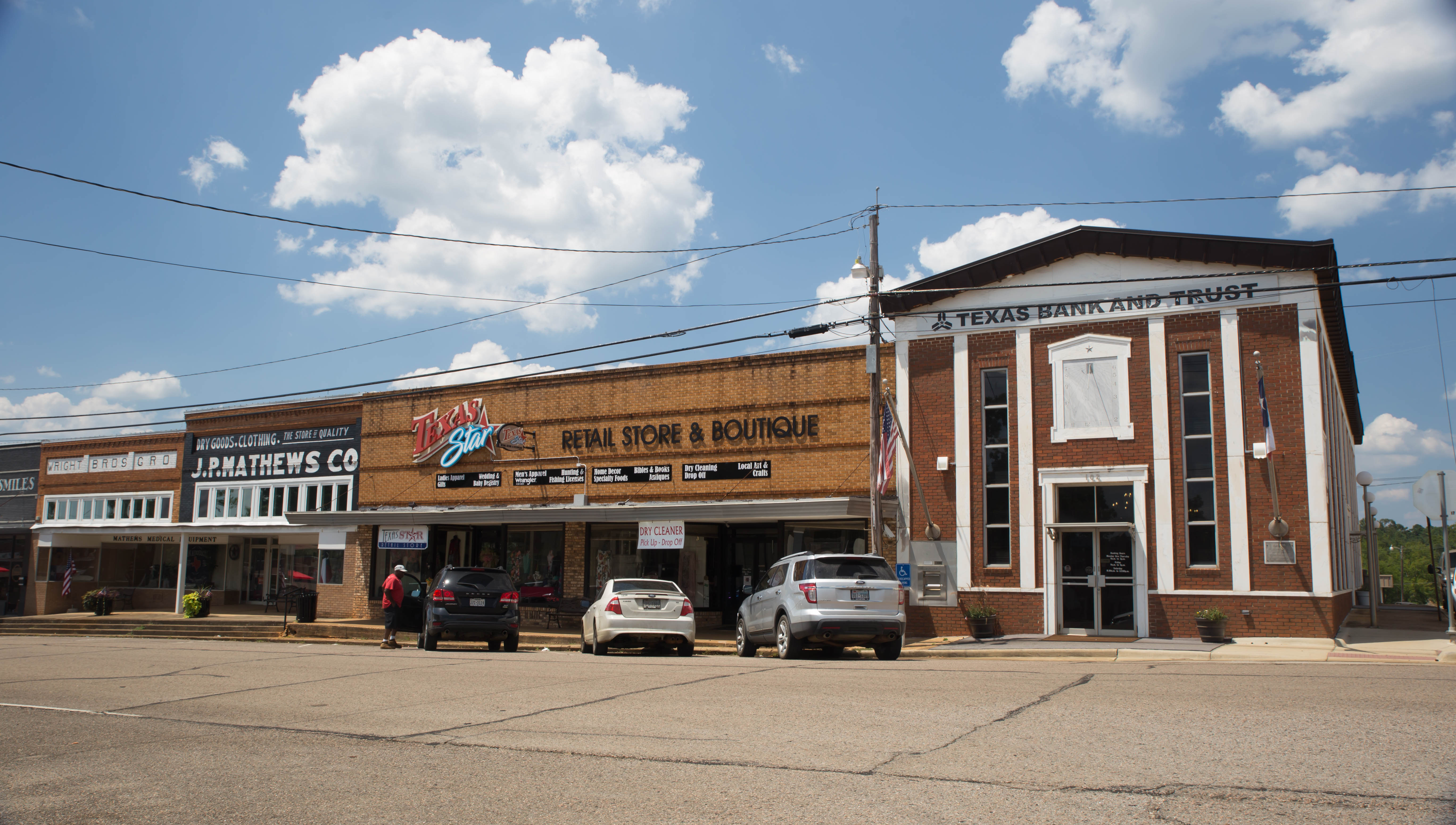
Texas State Bank

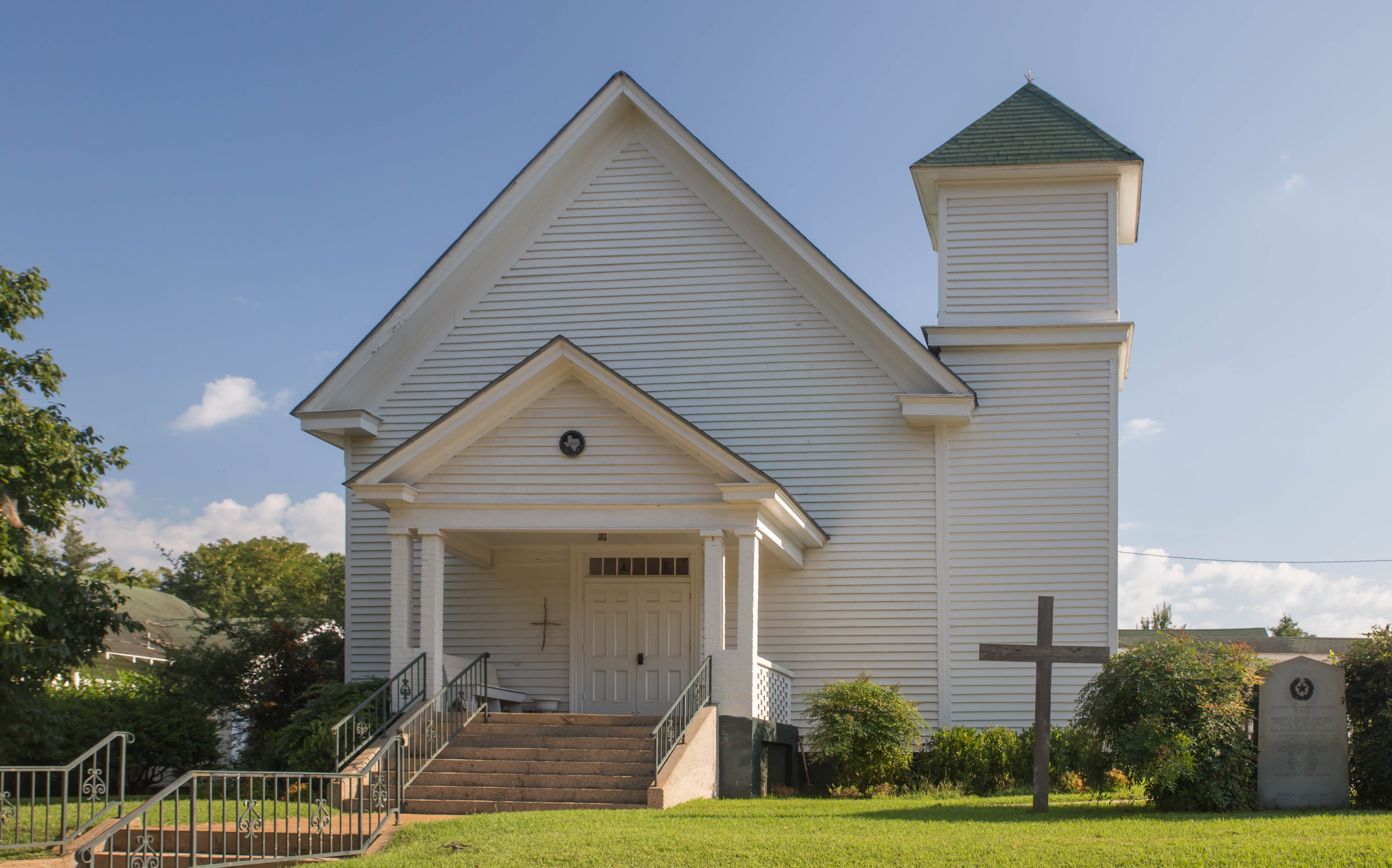
Presbyterian Church

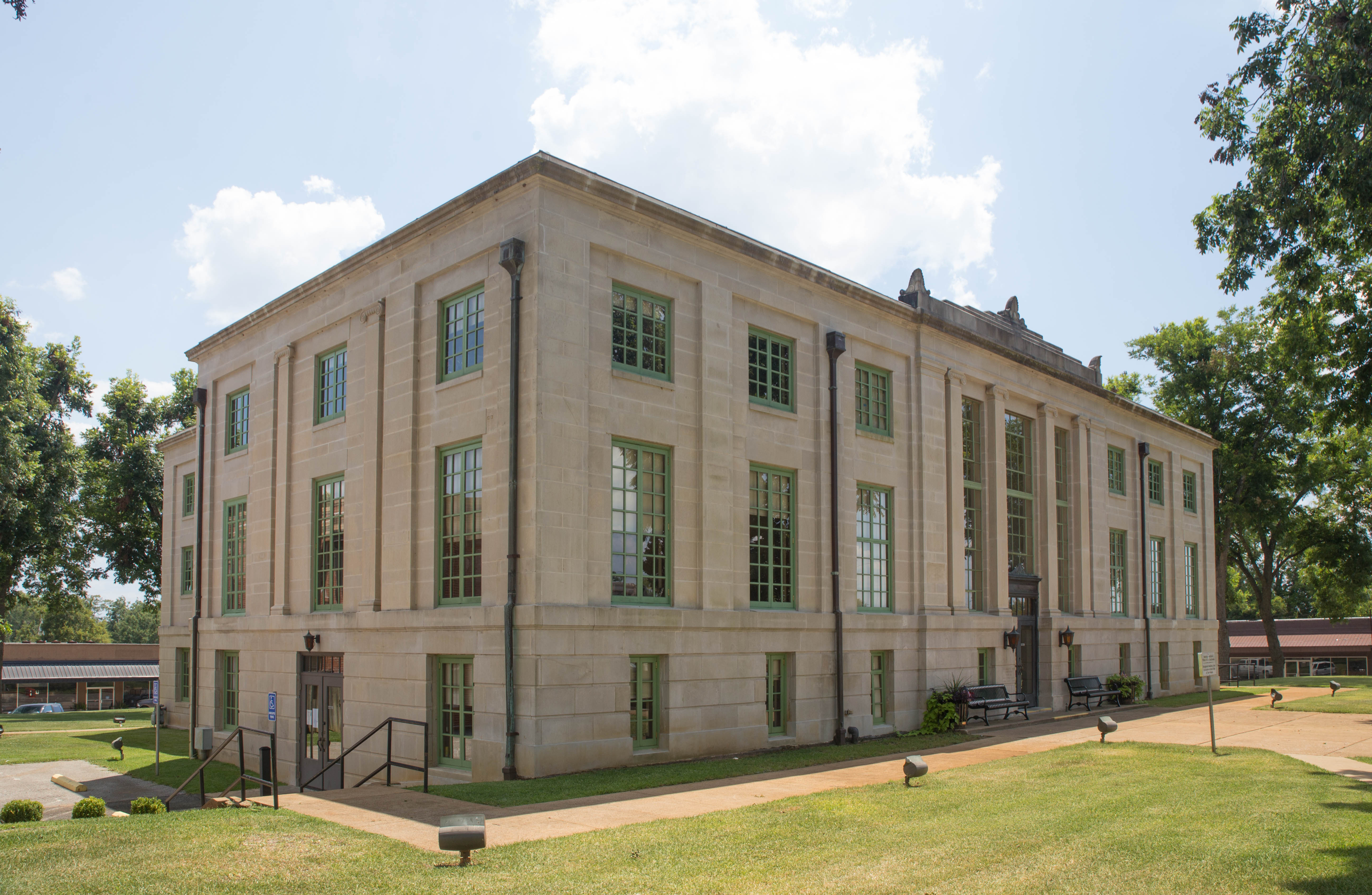
San Augustine County Courthouse

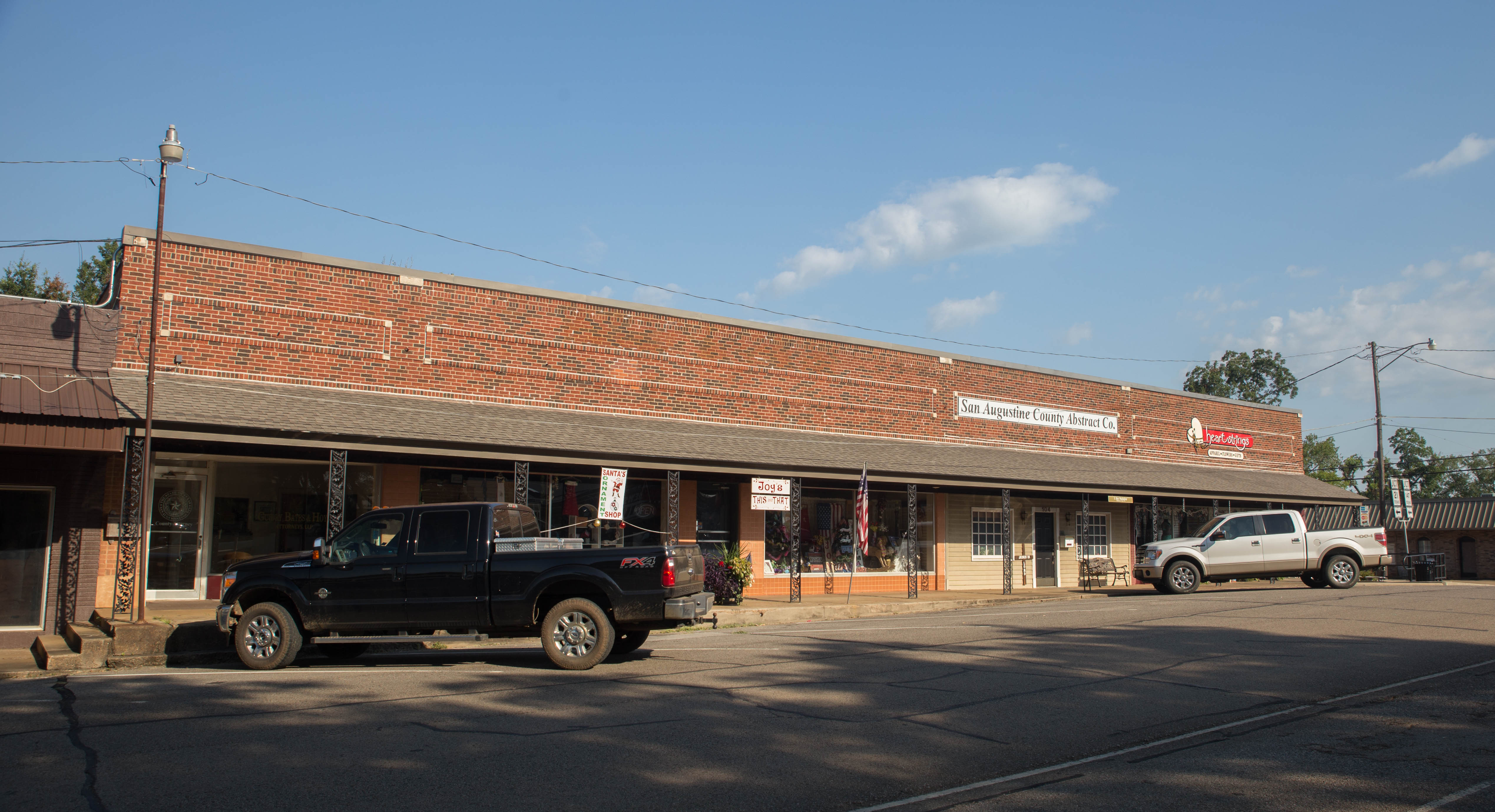
Retail stores in Historic Commercial District

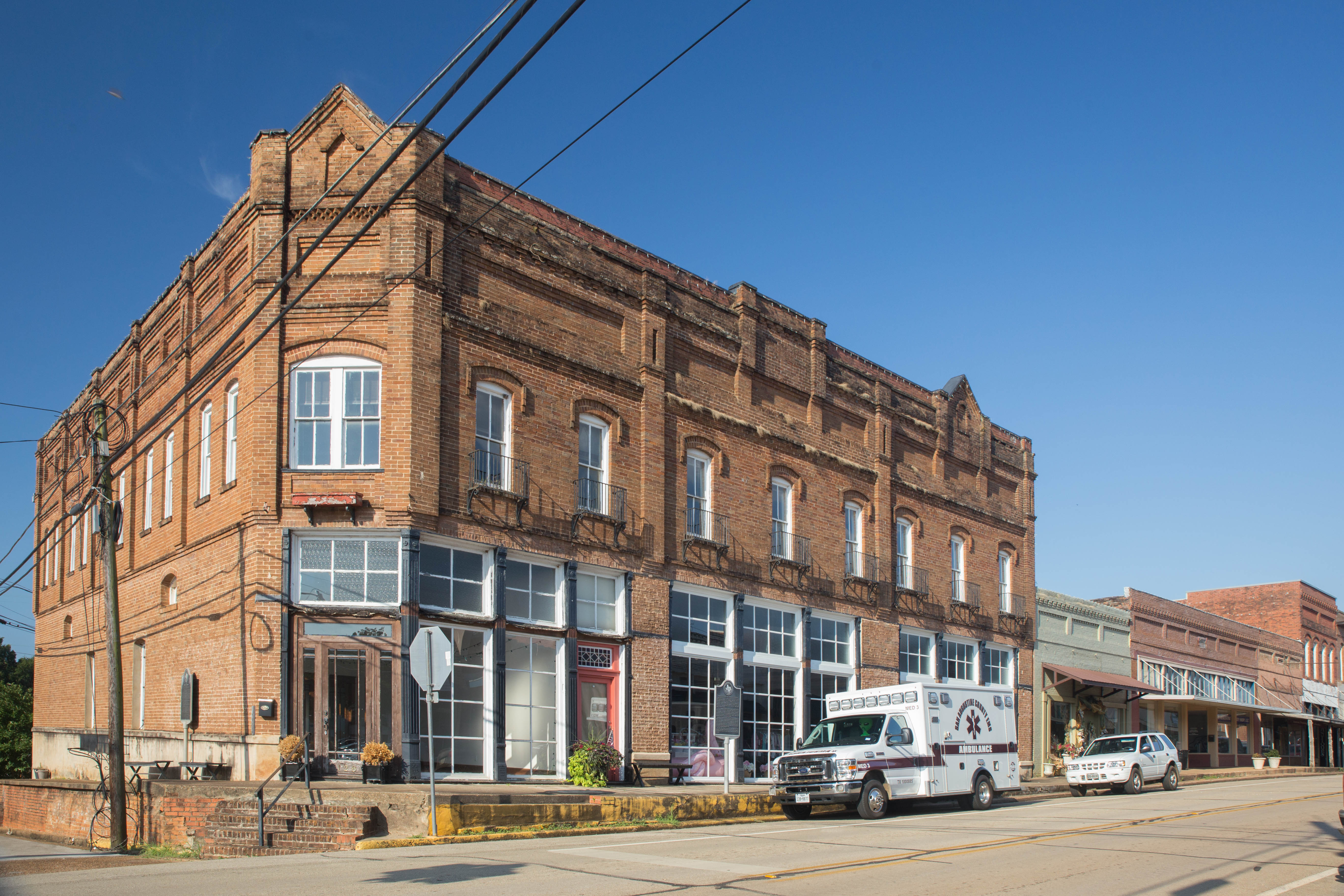
Historic building in downtown San Augustine

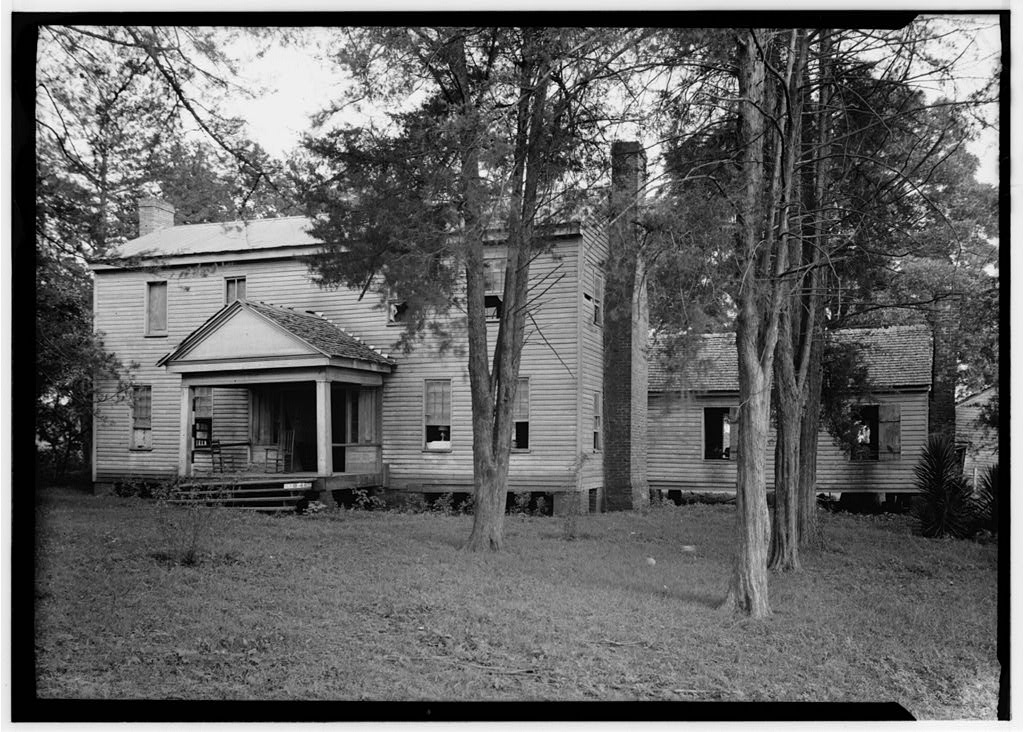
Hail Blount House, April 2012

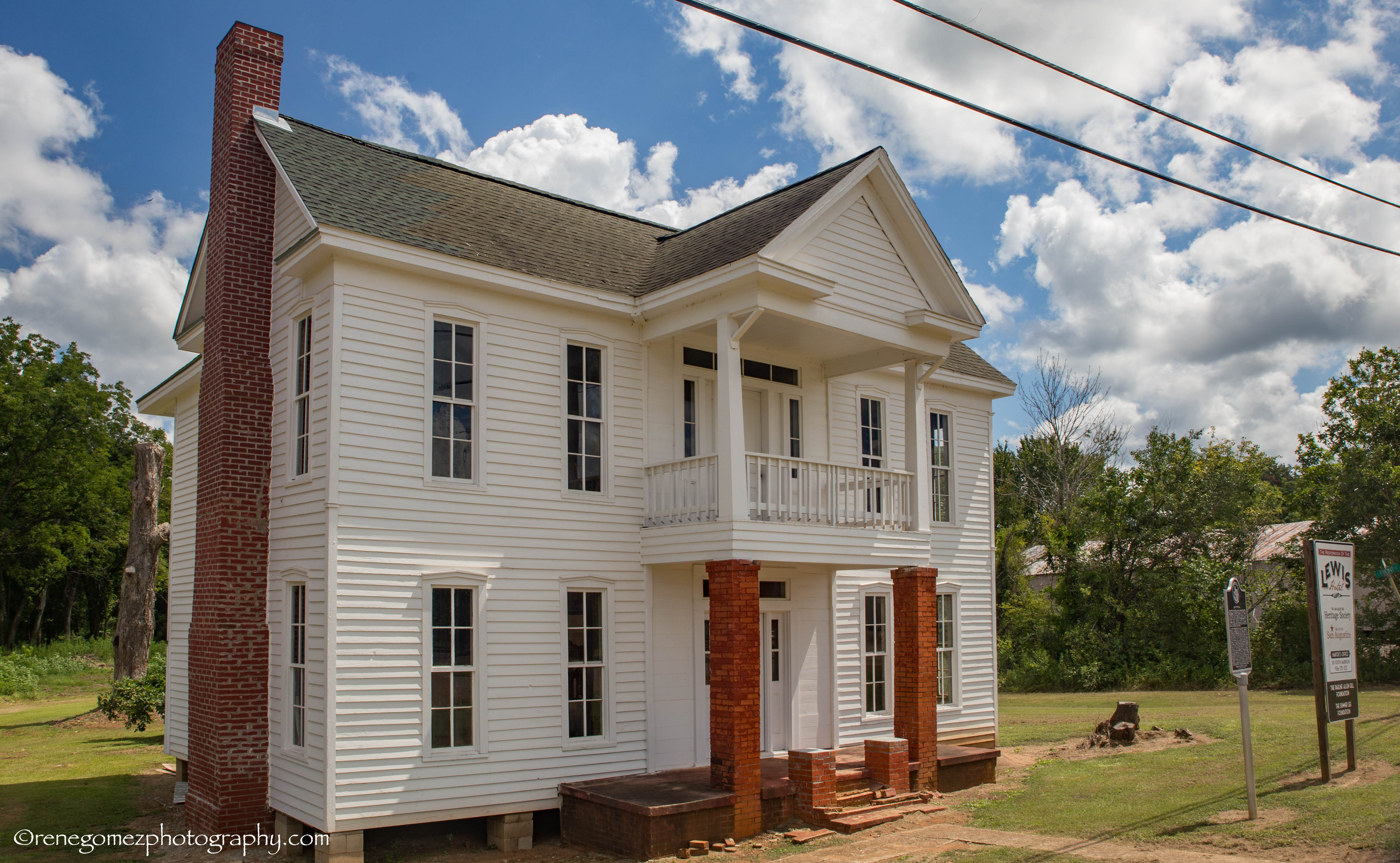
Lewis Hotel

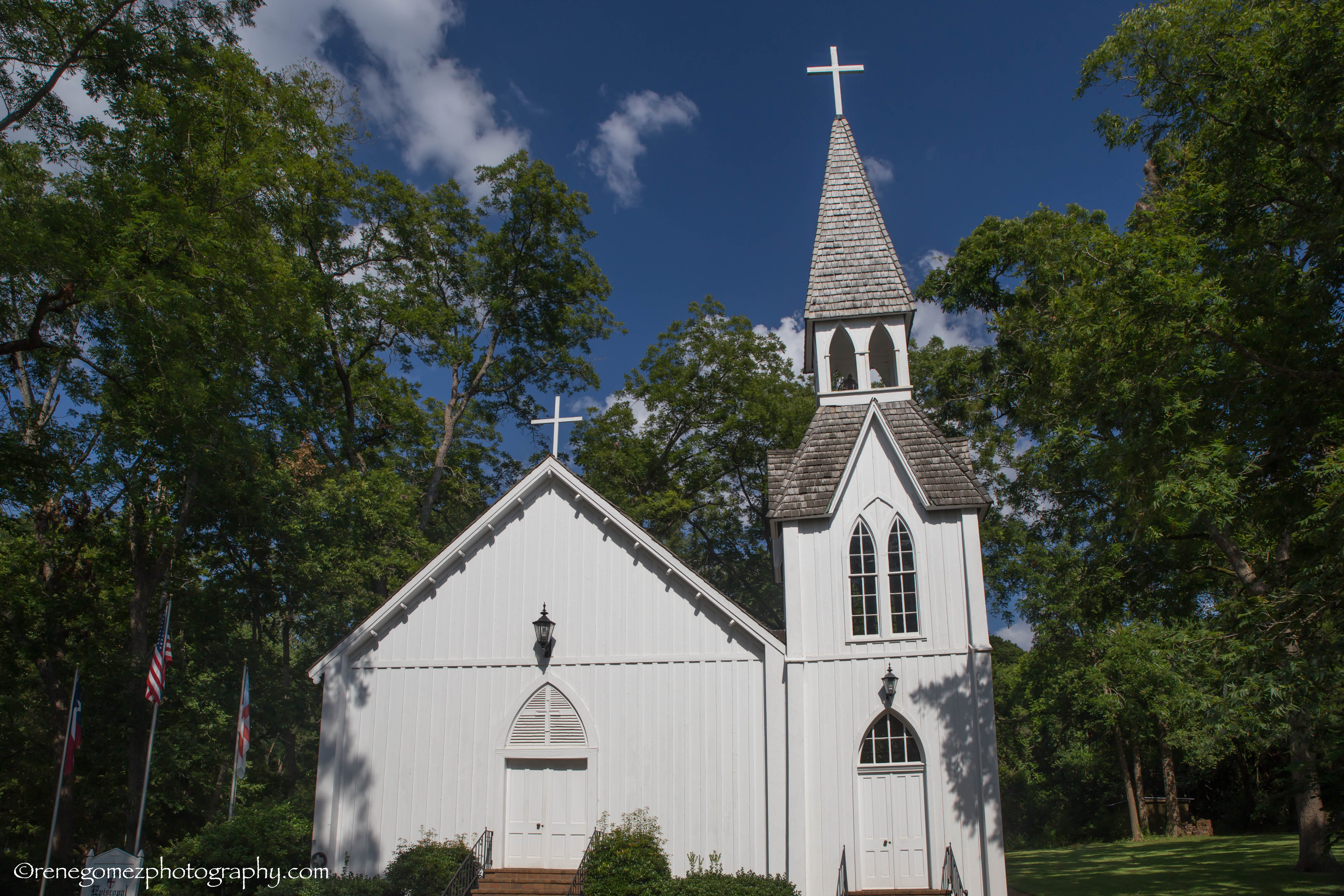
Christ Church Episcopal Church

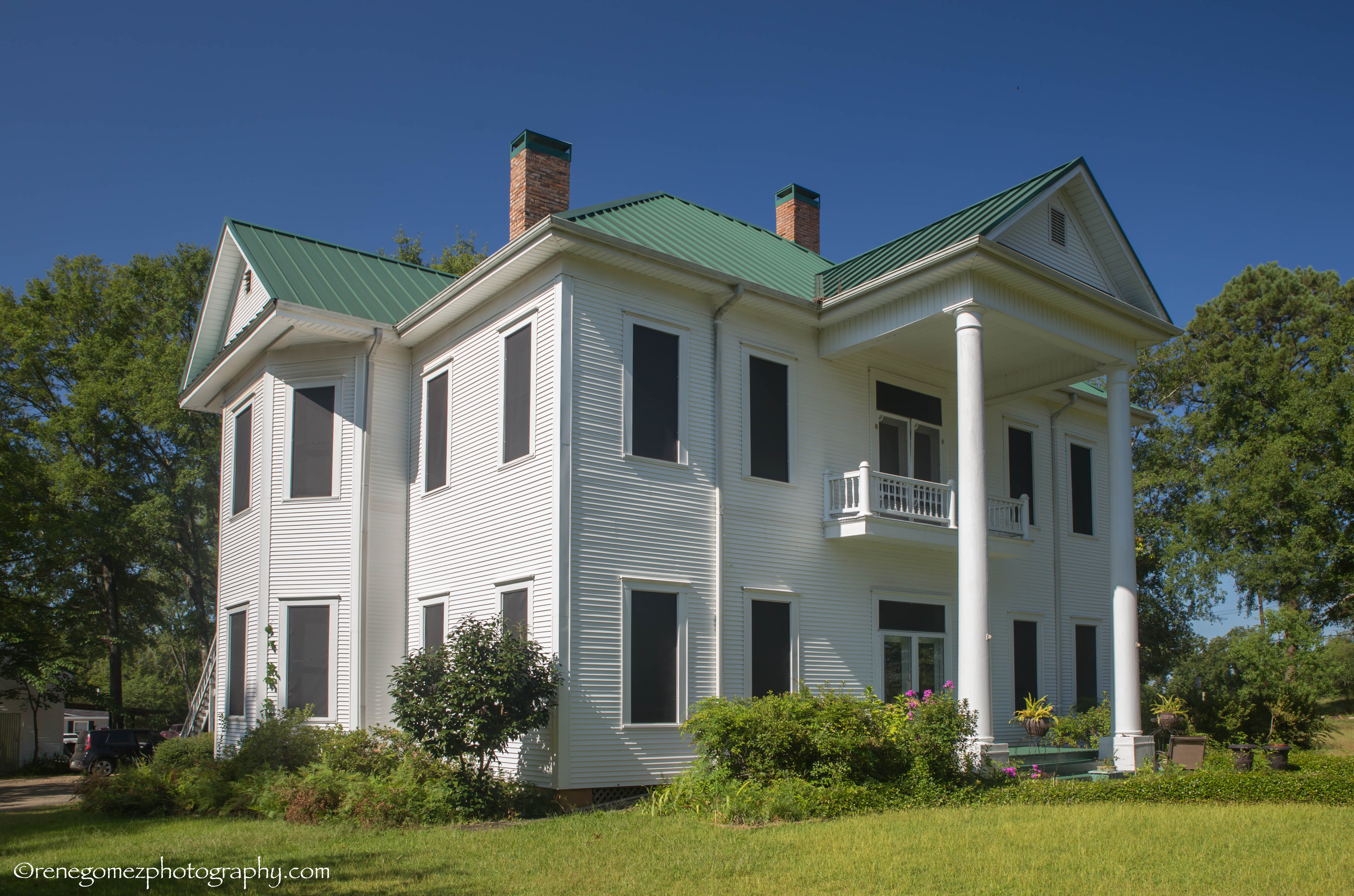
The Columns Bed and Breakfast

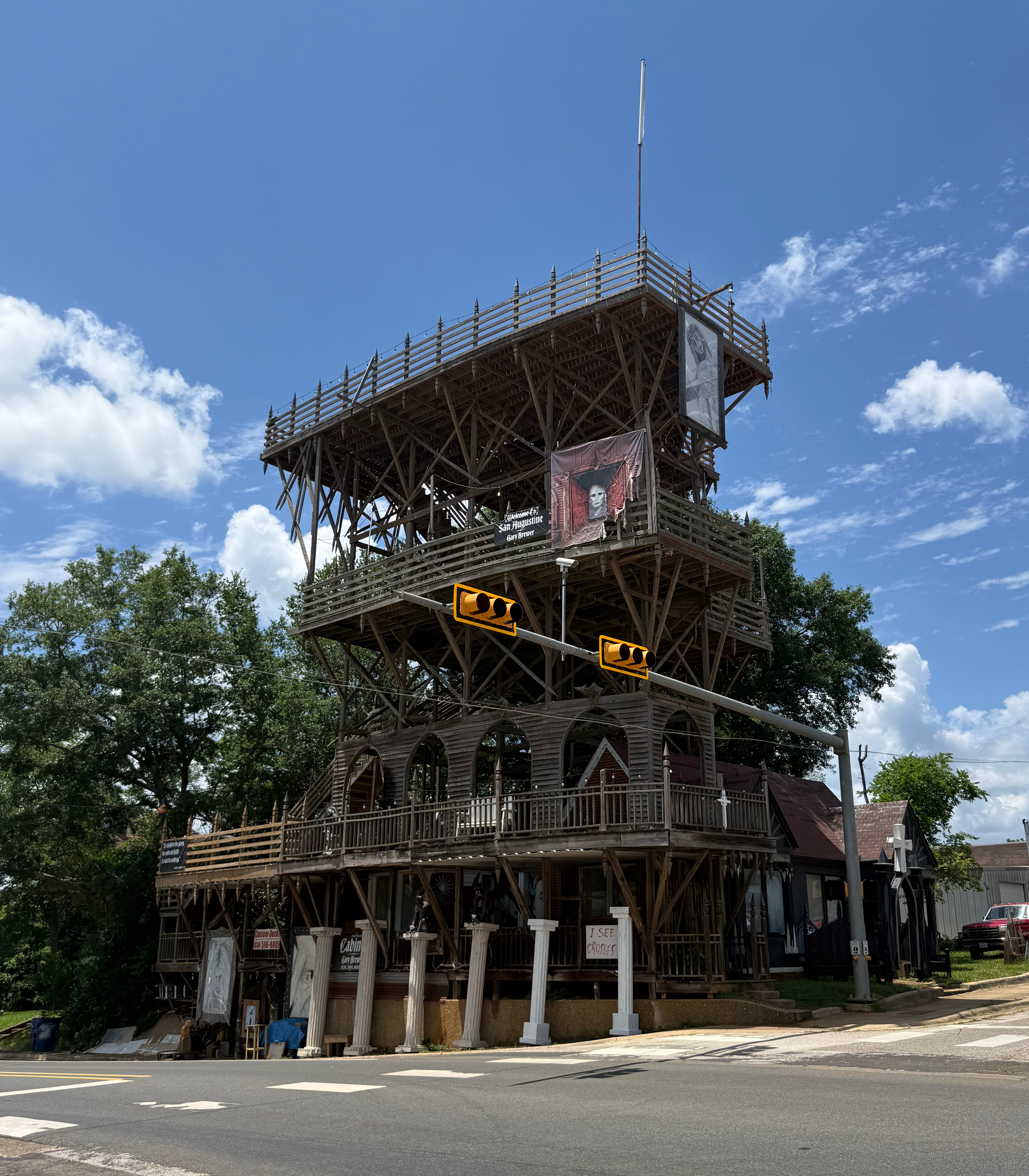
Gary Brewer's deck house

== See also ==
- List of municipalities in Texas
