= Broaddus Independent School District =

School district in Texas

Location
- 1 Bulldog Plaza; Broaddus, Texas ESC Region 7 USA
- Coordinates: 31°18′27″N 94°15′59″W

District information
- Type: Independent school district
- Grades: Pre-K-3 through 12
- Superintendent: Lucas Holloway
- Schools: 2 (2025-2026)
- NCES District ID: 4811430

Students and staff
- Students: 380 (2025-26)
- Teachers: 38.59 (2009-10) (on full-time equivalent (FTE) basis)
- Student–teacher ratio: 12.28 (2009-10)

Other information
- Website: Broaddus ISD

Broaddus Independent School District is a public school district based in Broaddus, Texas (USA). The district operates one high school, Broaddus High School.

== Academic achievement ==
In 2022, 2023, 2024, and 2025, the district received an A rating from the TEA.

== Campuses ==
The district operates two schools.

Regular instructional

- Broaddus High School (Grades 6-12)
- Broaddus Elementary (Grades PK-5)

== See also ==
- List of school districts in Texas
- List of high schools in Texas
