= San Augustine County, Texas =

County in Texas, United States

- County
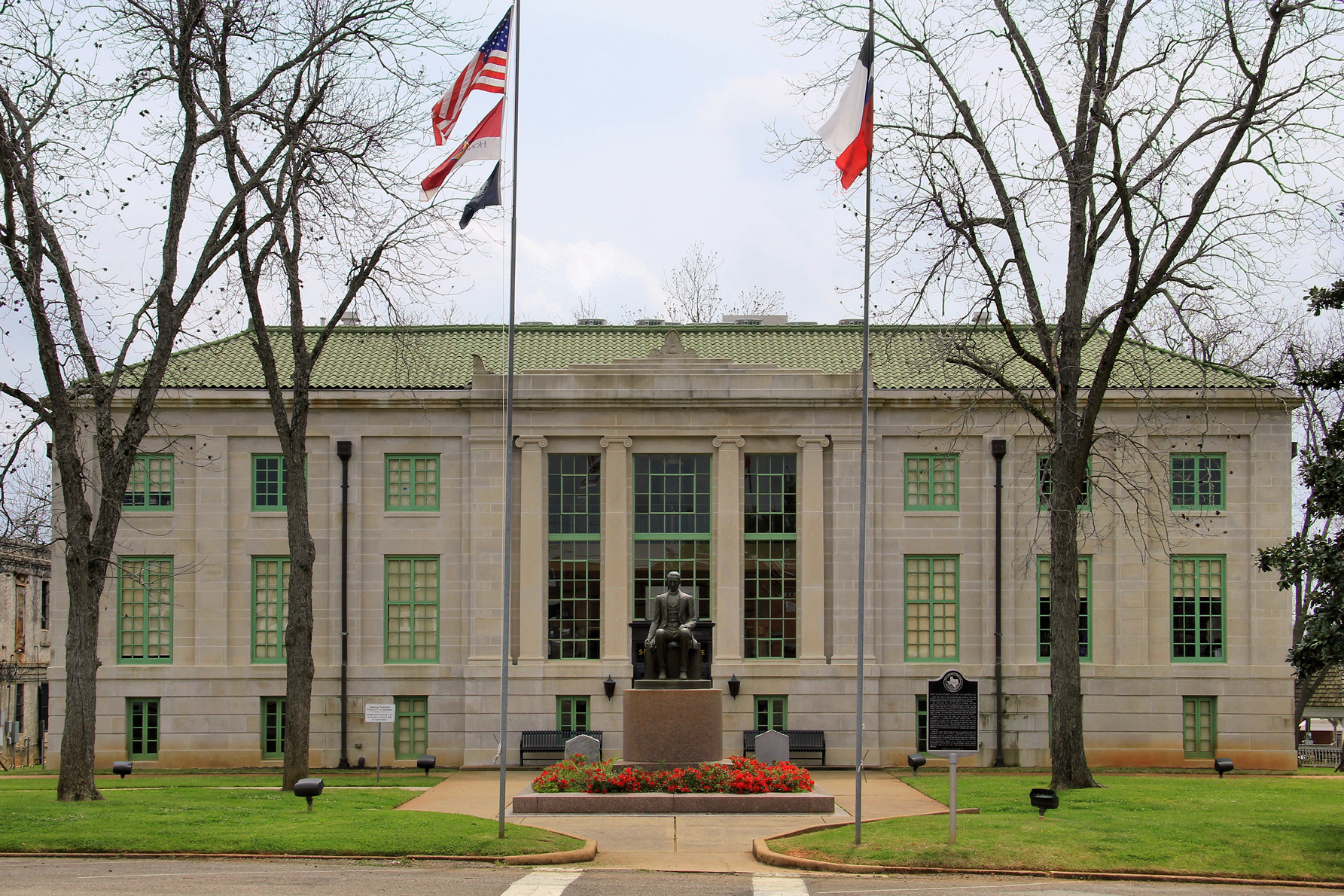
- The San Augustine County Courthouse

- Location within the U.S. state of Texas
- Coordinates: 31°24′N 94°11′W
- Country: United States
- State: Texas
- Founded: 1837
- Named for: Presidio de San Agustín de Ahumada, named for Agustín de Ahumada, 2nd Marquess of Amarillas
- Seat: San Augustine
- Largest city: San Augustine

Area
  - Total: 592 sq mi (1,530 km^{2})
  - Land: 531 sq mi (1,380 km^{2})
  - Water: 62 sq mi (160 km^{2}) 10%

Population (2020)
  - Total: 7,918
  - Estimate (2025): 7,722 ▼
  - Density: 14.9/sq mi (5.76/km^{2})
- Time zone: UTC−6 (Central)
  - Summer (DST): UTC−5 (CDT)
- Congressional district: 1st
- Website: www.co.san-augustine.tx.us

San Augustine County is a county located in the U.S. state of Texas. As of the 2020 census, its population was 7,918. Its county seat is San Augustine.

== History ==
San Augustine County was formed in 1837. It was supposedly named after Saint Augustine of Hippo, but more plausibly, the county was named for the town of San Augustine, which had been established five years earlier and whose name was based upon an 18th-century Spanish presidio (fortress), the Presidio de San Agustín de Ahumada, named for Agustín de Ahumada, 2nd Marquess of Amarillas.

== Geography ==
According to the U.S. Census Bureau, the county has a total area of 592 square miles (1,530 km^{2}), of which 62 square miles (160 km^{2}) (10%) are covered by water.

=== Major highways ===
- U.S. Highway 96
- State Highway 7
- State Highway 21
- State Highway 103
- State Highway 147
- Loop 547
- Spur 85

=== Adjacent counties ===
- Shelby County (north)
- Sabine County (east)
- Jasper County (south)
- Angelina County (southwest)
- Nacogdoches County (west)

=== Protected areas ===
- Angelina National Forest (part)
- Sabine National Forest (part)
- Mission Dolores State Historic Site

== Demographics ==
Historical population
Census	Pop.	Note	%±
1850	3,648		—
1860	4,094		12.2%
1870	4,196		2.5%
1880	5,084		21.2%
1890	6,688		31.5%
1900	8,434		26.1%
1910	11,264		33.6%
1920	13,737		22.0%
1930	12,471		−9.2%
1940	12,471		0.0%
1950	8,837		−29.1%
1960	7,722		−12.6%
1970	7,858		1.8%
1980	8,785		11.8%
1990	7,999		−8.9%
2000	8,946		11.8%
2010	8,865		−0.9%
2020	7,918		−10.7%
2025 (est.)	7,722	▼	−2.5%
U.S. Decennial Census; 1850–2010 2010–2020

=== Racial and ethnic composition ===
San Augustine County, Texas – Racial and ethnic composition Note: the US Census treats Hispanic/Latino as an ethnic category. This table excludes Latinos from the racial categories and assigns them to a separate category. Hispanics/Latinos may be of any race.
Race / Ethnicity (NH = Non-Hispanic)	Pop 1980	Pop 1990	Pop 2000	Pop 2010	Pop 2020	% 1980	% 1990	% 2000	% 2010	% 2020
White alone (NH)	6,093	5,607	6,066	6,183	5,270	69.36%	70.10%	67.81%	69.75%	66.56%
Black or African American alone (NH)	2,588	2,236	2,484	2,013	1,768	29.46%	27.95%	27.77%	22.71%	22.33%
Native American or Alaska Native alone (NH)	17	11	11	16	19	0.19%	0.14%	0.12%	0.18%	0.24%
Asian alone (NH)	4	6	18	22	36	0.05%	0.08%	0.20%	0.25%	0.45%
Native Hawaiian or Pacific Islander alone (NH)	x	x	0	0	0	x	x	0.00%	0.00%	0.00%
Other race alone (NH)	3	1	1	10	0	0.03%	0.01%	0.01%	0.11%	0.00%
Mixed race or Multiracial (NH)	x	x	46	89	186	x	x	0.51%	1.00%	2.35%
Hispanic or Latino (any race)	80	138	320	532	639	0.91%	1.73%	3.58%	6.00%	8.07%
Total	8,785	7,999	8,946	8,865	7,918	100.00%	100.00%	100.00%	100.00%	100.00%

=== 2020 census ===
As of the 2020 census, the county had a population of 7,918. The median age was 49.3 years. 20.6% of residents were under the age of 18 and 26.7% of residents were 65 years of age or older. For every 100 females there were 95.4 males, and for every 100 females age 18 and over there were 93.5 males age 18 and over.

The racial makeup of the county was 67.6% White, 22.5% Black or African American, 0.4% American Indian and Alaska Native, 0.5% Asian, <0.1% Native Hawaiian and Pacific Islander, 4.0% from some other race, and 5.0% from two or more races. Hispanic or Latino residents of any race comprised 8.1% of the population.

<0.1% of residents lived in urban areas, while 100.0% lived in rural areas.

There were 3,257 households in the county, of which 26.1% had children under the age of 18 living in them. Of all households, 47.1% were married-couple households, 20.0% were households with a male householder and no spouse or partner present, and 28.5% were households with a female householder and no spouse or partner present. About 29.9% of all households were made up of individuals and 16.2% had someone living alone who was 65 years of age or older.

There were 4,733 housing units, of which 31.2% were vacant. Among occupied housing units, 79.4% were owner-occupied and 20.6% were renter-occupied. The homeowner vacancy rate was 1.7% and the rental vacancy rate was 9.4%.

=== 2000 census ===
As of the 2000 census, there were 8,946 people, 3,575 households, and 2,520 families residing in the county. The population density was 17 people per square mile (6.6 people/km^{2}). The 5,356 housing units had an average density of 10 units per square mile (3.9/km^{2}). The racial makeup of the county was 69.26% White, 27.95% Black or African American, 0.20% Native American, 0.20% Asian, 1.64% from other races, and 0.75% from two or more races. Hispanics or Latinos of any race made up about 3.58% of the population.

Of the 3,575 households, 26.8% had children under 18 living with them, 53.5% were married couples living together, 13.5% had a female householder with no husband present, and 29.5% were not families. About 27.0% of all households were made up of individuals, and 14.9% had someone living alone who was 65 or older. The average household size was 2.43 and the average family size was 2.93.

In the county, the age distribution was 23.7% under the age of 18, 6.8% from 18 to 24, 23.0% from 25 to 44, 25.1% from 45 to 64, and 21.4% who were 65 or older. The median age was 42 years. For every 100 females there were 92.10 males. For every 100 females 18 and over, there were 85.90 males.

The median income for a household in the county was $27,025, and for a family was $32,772. Males had a median income of $28,395 versus $18,925 for females. The per capita income for the county was $15,548. About 15.60% of families and 21.20% of the population were below the poverty line, including 30.70% of those under age 18 and 20.10% of those age 65 or over.

== Politics ==
United States presidential election results for San Augustine County, Texas
Year	Republican		Democratic		Third party(ies)	
Year	No.	%	No.	%	No.	%
1912	12	2.44%	375	76.22%	105	21.34%
1916	18	2.39%	682	90.69%	52	6.91%
1920	121	7.84%	658	42.62%	765	49.55%
1924	78	5.02%	1,475	94.98%	0	0.00%
1928	467	36.26%	821	63.74%	0	0.00%
1932	19	1.04%	1,802	98.96%	0	0.00%
1936	64	5.72%	1,054	94.28%	0	0.00%
1940	119	8.24%	1,325	91.76%	0	0.00%
1944	102	7.98%	1,176	92.02%	0	0.00%
1948	137	10.83%	858	67.83%	270	21.34%
1952	730	34.94%	1,359	65.06%	0	0.00%
1956	900	45.07%	1,086	54.38%	11	0.55%
1960	638	32.52%	1,269	64.68%	55	2.80%
1964	760	39.18%	1,173	60.46%	7	0.36%
1968	506	20.57%	817	33.21%	1,137	46.22%
1972	1,508	66.49%	753	33.20%	7	0.31%
1976	1,047	36.48%	1,817	63.31%	6	0.21%
1980	1,397	45.20%	1,674	54.16%	20	0.65%
1984	1,937	54.89%	1,583	44.86%	9	0.26%
1988	1,946	47.65%	2,118	51.86%	20	0.49%
1992	1,243	34.06%	1,737	47.60%	669	18.33%
1996	1,296	36.39%	1,924	54.03%	341	9.58%
2000	2,116	55.61%	1,636	43.00%	53	1.39%
2004	2,235	59.49%	1,506	40.09%	16	0.43%
2008	2,342	63.04%	1,328	35.75%	45	1.21%
2012	2,469	66.91%	1,193	32.33%	28	0.76%
2016	2,622	73.47%	910	25.50%	37	1.04%
2020	3,007	75.14%	980	24.49%	15	0.37%
2024	2,917	77.85%	809	21.59%	21	0.56%

United States Senate election results for San Augustine County, Texas1
Year	Republican		Democratic		Third party(ies)	
Year	No.	%	No.	%	No.	%
2024	2,834	76.45%	808	21.80%	65	1.75%

United States Senate election results for San Augustine County, Texas2
Year	Republican		Democratic		Third party(ies)	
Year	No.	%	No.	%	No.	%
2020	2,898	74.75%	928	23.94%	51	1.32%

Texas Gubernatorial election results for San Augustine County
Year	Republican		Democratic		Third party(ies)	
Year	No.	%	No.	%	No.	%
2022	2,288	79.86%	546	19.06%	31	1.08%

At the presidential level, San Augustine County has voted for the Republican candidate in every election since 2000, having usually been carried by Democratic candidates up until that point.

Like many areas of the South, while Republicans generally win federal and state elections, Democrats tend to perform better in down-ballot races for local offices. Identification with the Democratic Party is strong in San Augustine County. In 2012, roughly 24% of eligible voters participated in the Democratic primary, while less than 6% participated in the Republican primary, despite there being a competitive presidential primary on the Republican ballot.

=== Elected officials ===
At the federal level, San Augustine County is part of the 1st Congressional District, which is currently represented by Louie Gohmert, a Republican from Tyler.

In the Texas Legislature, the county is represented by State Representative Trent Ashby in the 9th district (R-Lufkin), and by State Senator Robert Nichols in the 3rd district (R-Jacksonville).

== Communities ==
- Black Ankle
- Benina
- Broaddus
- San Augustine (county seat)

== Education ==
School districts:

- Broaddus Independent School District
- Brookeland Independent School District
- Chireno Independent School District
- San Augustine Independent School District

The county is in the service area of Angelina College.

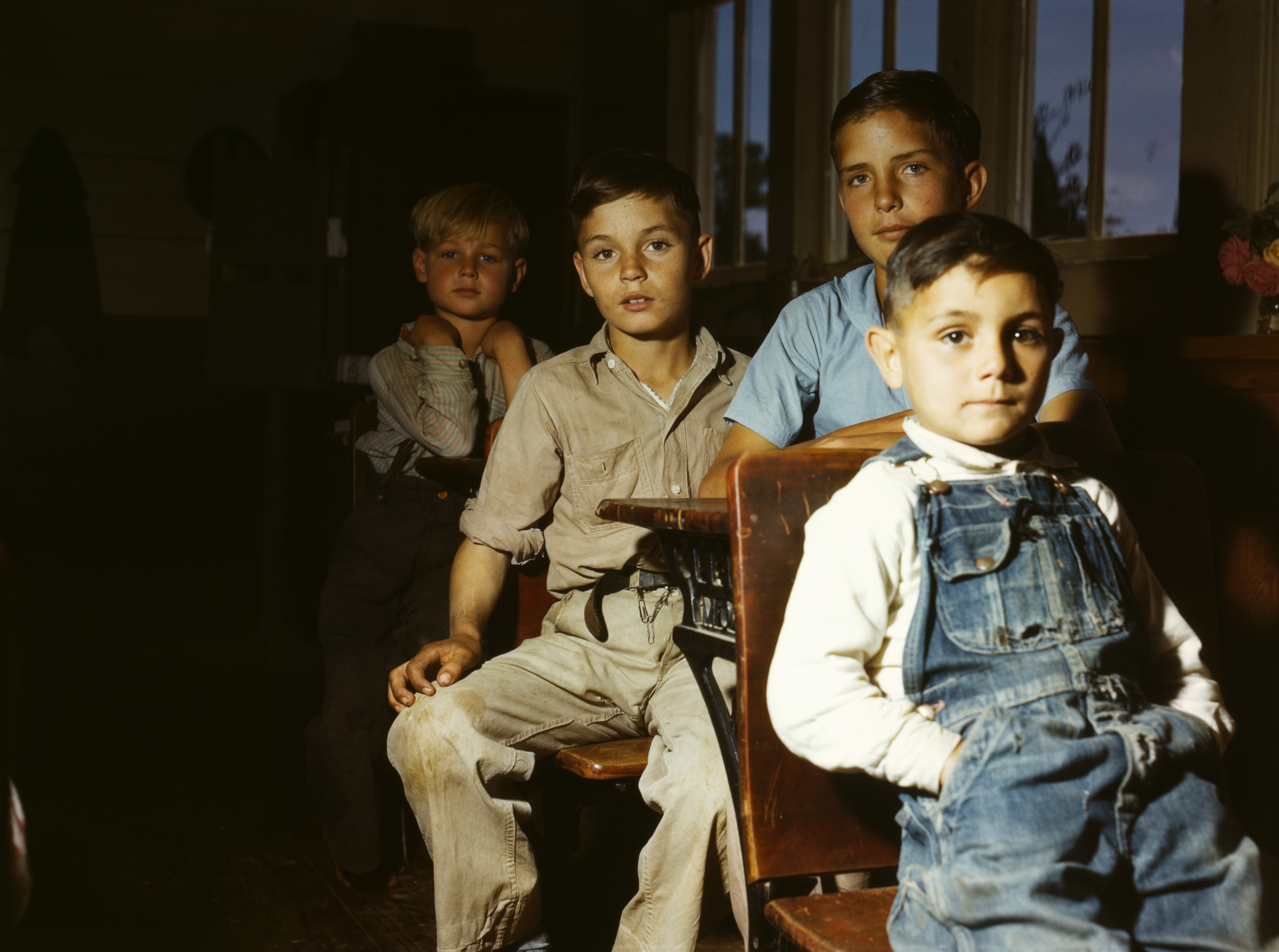
Rural school children, San Augustine County, Texas. Photograph by John Vachon.

== In popular culture ==
American photographer John Vachon took a series of photographs of rural schoolchildren in San Augustine County, Texas, for the Farm Security Administration in 1943.

== See also ==
- National Register of Historic Places listings in San Augustine County, Texas
- Recorded Texas Historic Landmarks in San Augustine County
