= List of Farm to Market Roads in Texas (2600–2699) =

- Texas Farm to Market Road and Ranch to Market Road markers

Highway names
- Interstates: Interstate Highway X (IH-X, I-X)
- US Highways: U.S. Highway X (US X)
- State: State Highway X (SH X)
- Loops: Loop X
- Spurs: Spur X
- Recreational: Recreational Road X (RE X)
- Farm or Ranch to Market Roads: Farm to Market Road X (FM X); Ranch to Market Road X (RM X)
- Park Roads: Park Road X (PR X)

System links
- Highways in Texas; Interstate; US; State; Former; Toll; Loops; Spurs; FM/RM; Park; Rec

Farm to Market Roads in Texas are owned and maintained by the Texas Department of Transportation (TxDOT).

== RM 2600 ==
Ranch to Market Road 2600
- Location: Reagan County
- Length: 12.493 mi (20.106 km)
- Existed: May 7, 1974–present

=== FM 2600 ===
Farm to Market Road 2600
- Location: Nolan County
- Existed: November 24, 1959–July 26, 1963

A previous route numbered FM 2600 was designated on November 24, 1959, from FM 608 at Maryneal southward at a distance of 4.0 miles (6.4 km). The highway was cancelled on July 25, 1963, with the mileage being transferred to FM 1170.

== FM 2601 ==
Farm to Market Road 2601
- Location: Bell County
- Length: 5.738 mi (9.234 km)
- Existed: November 24, 1959–present

Farm to Market Road 2601 (FM 2601) is located in Bell County. It begins at an intersection with Moody-Leon Road and Buckhorn Lane in Meadow Grove. The route travels in a generally eastern direction, turning south at Munz Road before turning back east at FM 2409. FM 2601 continues to run eastward to an intersection with SH 317.

FM 2601 was designated on November 24, 1959, along the current route.

== FM 2602 ==
Farm to Market Road 2602
- Location: Bosque County
- Length: 9.511 mi (15.306 km)
- Existed: 1959–present

== FM 2603 ==
Farm to Market Road 2603
- Location: Falls and McLennan counties
- Length: 4.67 mi (7.52 km)
- Existed: 1959–present

== FM 2604 ==
Farm to Market Road 2604
- Location: Hill County
- Length: 2.463 mi (3.964 km)
- Existed: 1959–present

== FM 2605 ==
Farm to Market Road 2605
- Location: Gregg County
- Length: 2.447 mi (3.938 km)
- Existed: 1959–present

Farm to Market Road 2605 (FM 2605), known locally as Tenneryville Road, runs from FM 1845 in Longview west to Whatley Road in White Oak.

FM 2605 was designated on November 24, 1959, along its current route. On June 27, 1995, FM 2605 was redesignated Urban Road 2605 (UR 2605). The designation reverted to FM 2605 with the elimination of the Urban Road system on November 15, 2018.

== FM 2606 ==
Farm to Market Road 2606
- Location: Clay County
- Length: 12.071 mi (19.426 km)
- Existed: November 16, 1968–present

Farm to Market Road 2606 (FM 2606) is located in Clay County.

FM 2606 is a two-lane route for its entire length. Its western terminus is at FM 1954 near the entrance to Lake Arrowhead State Park. The route travels to the east, past the north edge of Lake Arrowhead and across the Wichita Falls Dam on a load-zoned bridge. It winds around the northeastern edge of the lake before veering to the northeast at an intersection with Bunny Run Road. The route turns to the east near its eastern terminus at FM 2847, which provides access to Henrietta.

The current FM 2606 was designated on November 16, 1968. The original route was the section from FM 2847 to the east edge of the bridge across the Wichita Falls Dam. The designation was extended across the dam and to FM 1954 on September 26, 1979.

=== FM 2606 (1959) ===
Farm to Market Road 2606
- Location: Rusk County
- Existed: November 24, 1959–February 23, 1960

The first FM 2606 was designated in Rusk County on November 24, 1959, from SH 322 in Elderville to FM 1716; that route was canceled on February 23, 1960, with the mileage transferred to FM 2011.

=== FM 2606 (1960) ===
Farm to Market Road 2606
- Location: Williamson County
- Existed: September 27, 1960–June 2, 1967

The second FM 2606 was designated in Williamson County from US 81 northeast 5.6 miles (9.0 km); it was designated on September 27, 1960. On July 24, 1961, the east end was relocated, adding 0.2 miles; that designation was cancelled on June 2, 1967, when it was combined with FM 971.

== FM 2607 ==
Farm to Market Road 2607
- Location: Smith County
- Length: 3.205 mi (5.158 km)
- Existed: November 24, 1959–present

Farm to Market Road 2607 is a 3.205-mile (5.158 km) state road in Smith County that connects Texas State Highway 64 and County Road 230 (southeast of New Chapel Hill) with Farm to Market Road 850 (east-northeast of New Chapel Hill).

== FM 2608 ==
Farm to Market Road 2608
- Location: Shelby County
- Length: 1.956 mi (3.148 km)
- Existed: 1959–present

== FM 2609 ==
Farm to Market Road 2609
- Location: Nacogdoches County
- Length: 14.444 mi (Note: The certified length given is shorter than the actual mileage, as the Texas Department of Transportation description of FM 2609 considers it to be discontinuous at rather than concurrent with FM 941.) (23.245 km)
- Existed: 1959–present

Farm to Market Road 2609 (FM 2609) is located in Nacogdoches County.

FM 2609 begins at an intersection with US 59 / Loop 224 in Nacogdoches. The highway travels in an eastern direction along Austin Street, running through the city's northwest side. Between Future Bus. I-69/Bus. US 59 and FM 1275, FM 2609 travels near the northern end of Stephen F. Austin State University. Northeast of the university, the highway travels through the city's northeast side before intersecting Loop 224 a second time and leaving the city. The highway enters the city of Appleby and has a brief overlap with FM 941. After leaving Appleby, FM 2609 travels in a more eastern direction, with state maintenance ending just west of County Road 266 / County Road 273; the roadway continues east as Cedar Bluff Road.

FM 2609 was designated on November 24, 1959, from FM 1878 northeast to FM 941. On February 29, 1960, the southern terminus of FM 2609 was moved to US 59 (became Loop 495 on October 2, 1970; this was redesignated as Bus. US 59 on June 21, 1990), increasing the distance by 0.4 miles (0.64 km). The old route south to FM 1878 was requested by the Nacogdoches County to be renumbered on March 7, 1960, when the county accepted the relocation of FM 2609, and on March 21, 1960, the old route was designated as FM 1411. On May 7, 1970, the highway was extended northeast 2.6 miles (4.2 km) from FM 941, also creating a concurrency with FM 941. On September 26, 1979, FM 2609 was extended northeast 2.5 miles (4.0 km) to its current end. On July 29, 1987, FM 2609 was extended west to US 59.

Junction list

The entire route is in Nacogdoches County.

Location	mi	km	Destinations	Notes
Nacogdoches	0.0	0.0	US 59 (Future I-69) / Loop 224 (NW Stallings Drive)	
Nacogdoches	0.6	0.97	FM 1638 (Old Tyler Road)	
Nacogdoches	1.9	3.1	I-69 BL / Bus. US 59 (North Street) – Downtown, SFA	
Nacogdoches	2.6	4.2	FM 1275 (University Drive) – Mast Arboretum, Downtown	
Nacogdoches	3.2	5.1	FM 1411 south (Appleby Sand Road)	
Nacogdoches	4.4	7.1	Loop 224 (NE Stallings Drive)	
Appleby	9.3	15.0	FM 941 south	South end of FM 941 overlap
Appleby	9.6	15.4	FM 941 north	North end of FM 941 overlap
	14.7	23.7	Cedar Bluff Road	
1.000 mi = 1.609 km; 1.000 km = 0.621 mi: Concurrency terminus

== FM 2610 ==
Farm to Market Road 2610
- Location: Polk and Liberty counties
- Length: 8.068 mi (12.984 km)
- Existed: November 24, 1959–present

Farm to Market Road 2610 (FM 2610) is located in Polk and Liberty counties. It runs between SH 146 and FM 787 and is approximately 8.0 miles (12.9 km) long. The communities of Ace and Romayor lie along its route.

FM 2610 was designated on November 24, 1959, from SH 146 4.0 miles (6.4 km) south of Schwab City south to the Liberty County line. The road was extended south to SH 105 (now FM 787) on September 20, 1961.

== FM 2611 ==
Farm to Market Road 2611
- Location: Brazoria and Matagorda counties
- Length: 13.387 mi (21.544 km)
- Existed: November 24, 1959–present

Farm to Market Road 2611 (FM 2611) is 13.387-mile (21.544 km) state road in Brazoria and Matagorda counties.

FM 2611 begins where FM 2004 ends at SH 36 near Jones Creek. The road follows a western path, crossing the San Bernard River and passing the Churchill Bridge Community. The highway intersects FM 2918, an access highway to the River's End Community and the San Bernard Wildlife Refuge. Making a sharp northward and then westward turn, FM 2611 continues its western path 10 miles (16 km) south of Sweeny, entering Matagorda County and the community of Cedar Lake. FM 2611 ends at an intersection with FM 457, which connects Sargent to Bay City.

FM 2611 was designated on November 24, 1959, from SH 36 southwest to what is now FM 2918. On May 2, 1962, FM 2611 was extended southwest to FM 457, replacing FM 2541.

== FM 2612 ==
Farm to Market Road 2612
- Location: Cass County
- Length: 2.298 mi (3.698 km)
- Existed: August 31, 1981–present

Farm to Market Road 2612 (FM 2612) is located in Cass County in the town of Hughes Springs.

FM 2612 begins at an intersection with FM 250. The highway travels in an eastern direction, intersects FM 161, then turns northeast at County Road 2986 / 2990, before ending at an intersection with SH 11 / SH 49. FM 2612 acts as a bypass through the southern part of the town.

The current FM 2612 was designated on August 31, 1981, running from FM 250 eastward to the intersection of SH 11 / SH 49.

=== FM 2612 (1959) ===
Farm to Market Road 2612
- Location: Galveston County
- Existed: November 24, 1959–March 26, 1980

FM 2612 was originally designated on November 24, 1959, running from SH 87 near the Bolivar Ferry, northwestward to Quarles Avenue in Port Bolivar at a distance of 1.1 miles (1.8 km). The highway was extended 3.4 miles (5.5 km) northeastward and southeastward to SH 87 on May 2, 1962, creating a loop through Port Bolivar. FM 2612 was relocated through Port Bolivar on February 20, 1963, decreasing the route's length by 0.1 miles (0.16 km). The highway was cancelled and redesignated as Loop 108 on March 26, 1980.

== FM 2613 ==
Farm to Market Road 2613
- Location: Kaufman and Henderson counties
- Length: 5.488 mi (8.832 km)
- Existed: October 30, 1961–present

=== FM 2613 (1959) ===
Farm to Market Road 2613
- Location: Harris County
- Existed: November 24, 1959–September 18, 1961

A previous route numbered FM 2613 was designated on November 24, 1959, from US 90 southward 2.3 miles (3.7 km) to FM 526. This was cancelled on September 18, 1961 and transferred to FM 526 when it was rerouted.

== FM 2614 ==
Farm to Market Road 2614
- Location: Colorado and Wharton counties
- Length: 6.597 mi (10.617 km)
- Existed: 1959–present

Farm to Market Road 2614 (FM 2614) is located in Colorado and Wharton counties. The two-lane highway begins at FM 102 at Bonus, heads generally west through Elm Grove and ends at FM 950 to the northeast of Garwood.

FM 2614 is a two-lane highway along its entire route. The road begins at a stop sign on FM 102 near Bonus and follows a curving path to the southeast. At a distance 1.3 miles (2.1 km) from the start, FM 2614 intersects with Reynolds Road. Starting at this point, the highway begins to change direction so that it heads west-northwest until it reaches Foote Lane. In the 3.5 miles (5.6 km) stretch from Reynolds Road to Foote Lane, FM 2614 passes through Elm Grove and then crosses into Colorado County. At Foote Lane, the highway turns to the north-northwest and continues for 1.8 miles (2.9 km) to its northern end at FM 950. From the junction of FM 950 and FM 2614 to SH 71 at Garwood is 3.3 miles (5.3 km).

FM 2614 was designated on November 24, 1959, along its current route.

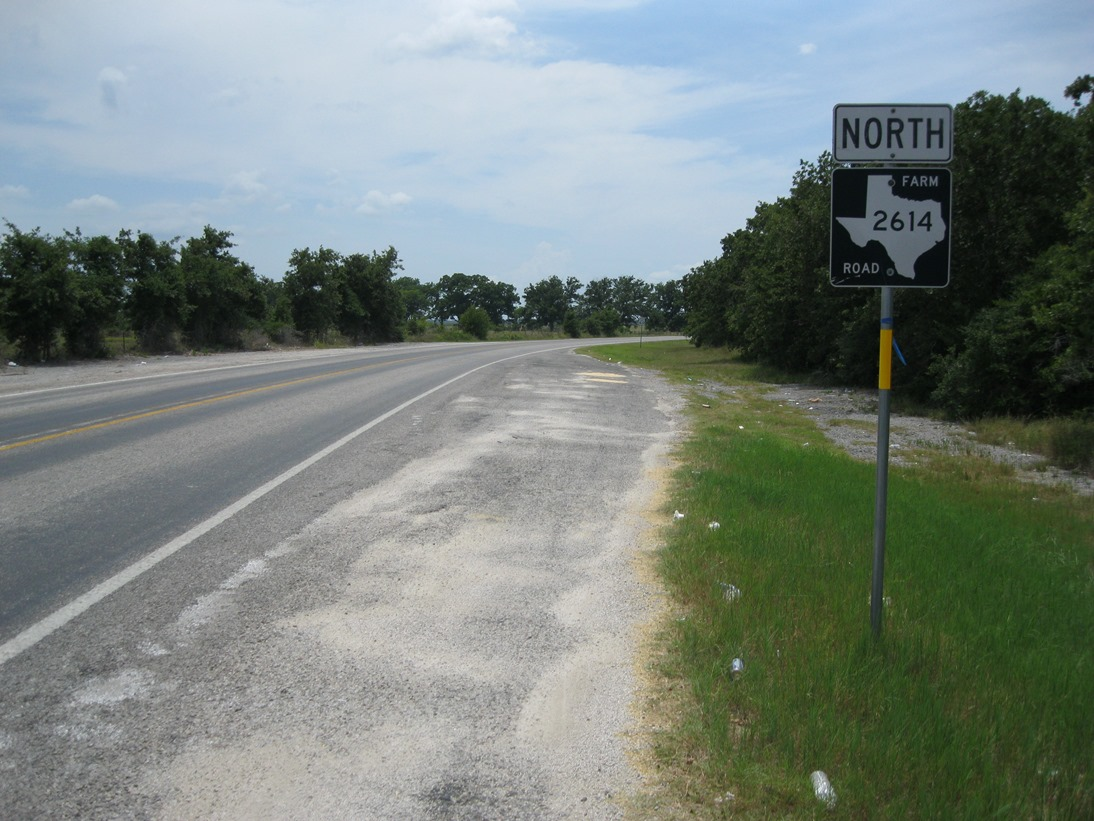
Though marked "North", FM 2614 initially goes southwest from the junction with FM 102 at Bonus.

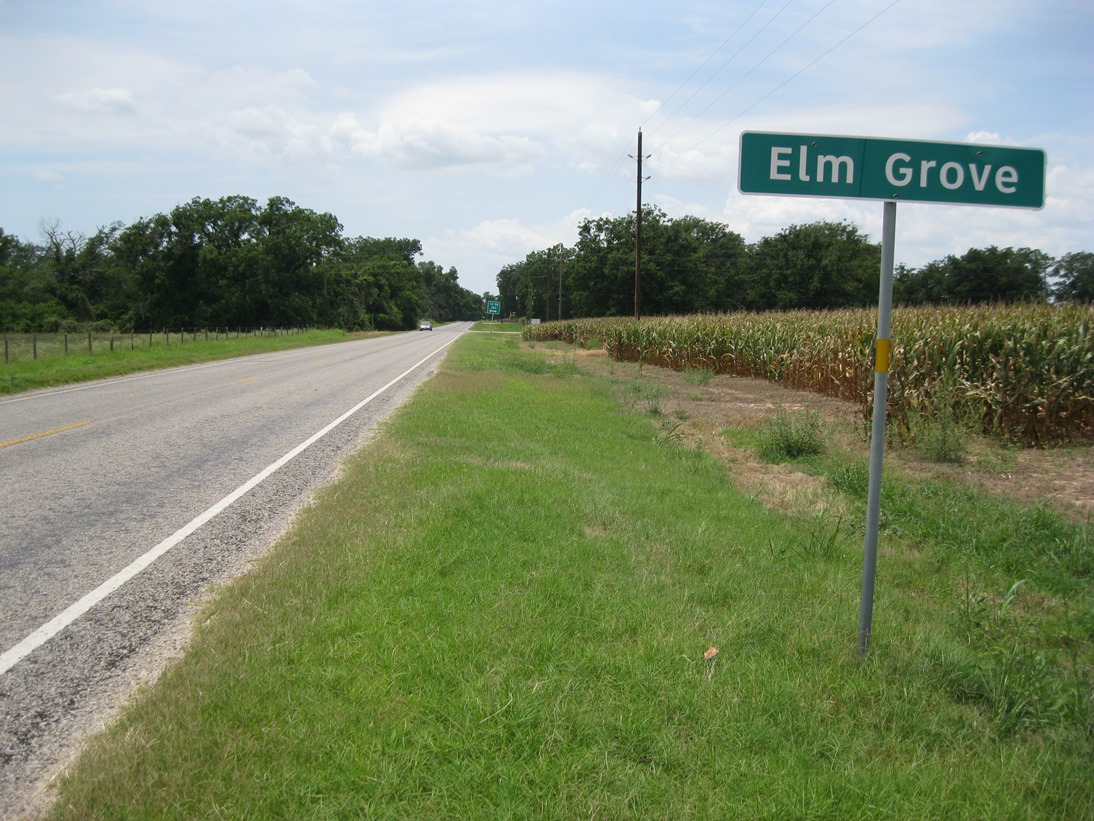
The small community of Elm Grove is near the midpoint of FM 2614. The view is to the west-northwest.

== FM 2615 ==
Farm to Market Road 2615
- Location: Victoria County
- Length: 5.761 mi (9.271 km)
- Existed: 1959–present

== FM 2616 ==
Farm to Market Road 2616
- Location: Lavaca County
- Length: 6.797 mi (10.939 km)
- Existed: 1959–present

== FM 2617 ==
Farm to Market Road 2617
- Location: Bee County
- Length: 1.155 mi (1.859 km)
- Existed: 1959–present

== RM 2618 ==
Ranch to Market Road 2618
- Location: Mason County
- Length: 7.122 mi (11.462 km)
- Existed: May 7, 1974–present

Ranch to Market Road 2618 (RM 2618) is located in Mason County.

RM 2618 begins at an intersection with RM 386 north of Mason. The highway travels in an eastern direction through rural and hilly ranching areas, with state maintenance ending just east of RM 1900; the roadway continues as Fly Gap Road.

RM 2618 was designated on May 7, 1974, running from RM 386 eastward at a distance of 2.7 miles (4.3 km). The highway was extended 4.7 miles (7.6 km) eastward on March 5, 1976.

=== FM 2618 (1959) ===
Farm to Market Road 2618
- Location: Burleson County
- Existed: November 24, 1959–December 19, 1969

The first route numbered FM 2618 was designated on November 24, 1959, from FM 111 (now FM 60) at Deanville south 3.1 miles (5.0 km) to a road intersection; 0.2 miles (0.32 km) were a replacement of FM Spur 111. On September 27, 1960, the road was extended south 2.6 miles (4.2 km) to a county road. On June 28, 1963, the road was extended north 3.6 miles (5.8 km) to a county road. FM 2618 was cancelled on December 16, 1969, and transferred to FM 111.

=== FM 2618 (1970) ===
Farm to Market Road 2618
- Location: Bell County
- Existed: May 7, 1970–January 31, 1974

The second route numbered FM 2618 was designated on May 7, 1970, running from FM 1741 eastward to US 190 at a distance of 5.5 miles (8.9 km). The highway was cancelled and combined with FM 93 on January 31, 1974.

== FM 2619 ==
Farm to Market Road 2619
- Location: Kleberg County
- Length: 2.671 mi (4.299 km)
- Existed: 1959–present

== FM 2620 ==
Farm to Market Road 2620
- Location: Grimes County
- Length: 11.435 mi (18.403 km)
- Existed: November 24, 1959–present

Farm to Market Road 2620 (FM 2620) is located in Grimes County. It runs from FM 1696 in Bedias to SH 30 near Shiro.

FM 2620 was designated on November 24, 1959, from SH 90 in Bedias to a point 3.1 miles (5.0 km) southeast. On February 21, 1961, the northern terminus was moved to FM 1696. Nine months later the road was extended south 5.0 miles (8.0 km) to SH 30, 3 miles (4.8 km) northeast of Shiro, replacing FM 2677.

== FM 2621 ==
Farm to Market Road 2621
- Location: Washington County
- Length: 6.684 mi (10.757 km)
- Existed: 1959–present

== FM 2622 ==
Farm to Market Road 2622
- Location: Denton County
- Length: 1.167 mi (1.878 km)
- Existed: November 24, 1959–present

Farm to Market Road 2622 (FM 2622) is located in Denton County. Its southern terminus is at an intersection with Old Stoney Road in Stony. It runs north approximately 1.2 miles (1.9 km) to US 380.

FM 2622 was designated on November 24, 1959, along the current route.

== FM 2623 ==
Farm to Market Road 2623
- Location: Guadalupe County
- Length: 4.136 mi (6.656 km)
- Existed: June 28, 1963–present

Farm to Market Road 2623 (FM 2623) is located in Guadalupe County. The highway connects SH 123 in Geronimo eastward to FM 20.

The current FM 2623 was designated on June 28, 1963, along the current route.

=== FM 2623 (1959) ===
Farm to Market Road 2623
- Location: Collin County
- Existed: November 24, 1959–June 25, 1962

A previous route numbered FM 2623 was designated on November 24, 1959, from FM 544 west of Plano south 2.6 miles (4.2 km) to the Dallas County line. FM 2623 was cancelled on June 25, 1962, and removed from the state highway system in exchange for extending FM 2551. This was later restored as FM 3193, but that was given to the cities of Plano and Dallas on May 25, 1991.

== FM 2624 ==
Farm to Market Road 2624
- Location: Bowie County
- Length: 5.419 mi (8.721 km)
- Existed: 1959–present

== FM 2625 ==
Farm to Market Road 2625
- Location: Harrison County
- Length: 30.71 mi (49.42 km)
- Existed: 1959–present

Farm to Market Road 2625 (FM 2625) is located in Harrison County.

FM 2625 begins at an intersection with FM 968 / FM 450 south of Hallsville. The highway travels in a southern / southeastern direction, turning east at a private county road, intersects FM 3251 near the Brandy Branch Reservoir, then intersects SH 43 near the Cave Springs Cemetery. FM 2625 continues to run in an eastern direction through forested areas and rural farm land, ending at an intersection with FM 9 southwest of Waskom.

FM 2625 was designated on November 24, 1959, from SH 43 near Darco, eastward to US 59 at a distance of 5.8 miles (9.3 km). The highway was extended 6.7 miles (10.8 km) eastward to FM 31 on May 2, 1962. FM 2625 was extended 1.5 miles (2.4 km) east of FM 31 to a road intersection on May 7, 1970. The highway was extended 1.6 miles (2.6 km) eastward on November 5, 1971. FM 2625 was extended 2.7 miles (4.3 km) eastward to a point near Stricklin Springs on November 3, 1972. The highway was extended 3.1 miles (5.0 km) eastward to FM 9 on September 5, 1973. FM 2625 was extended westward to FM 968 / FM 450 over part of FM 3251 on October 22, 1982.

Junction list

The entire route is in Harrison County.

Location	mi	km	Destinations	Notes
	0.0	0.0	FM 968 / FM 450 north – Longview, Hallsville	
	8.5	13.7	FM 3251 north – Brady Branch Reservoir	
	9.9	15.9	SH 43 – Marshall, Henderson	
	15.4	24.8	FM 2983 south	
	15.5	24.9	US 59 (Future I-369) – Marshall, Carthage	
	22.0	35.4	FM 31 – Marshall, Elysian Fields	
	30.7	49.4	FM 9 – Waskom, Panola	
1.000 mi = 1.609 km; 1.000 km = 0.621 mi

== FM 2626 ==
Farm to Market Road 2626
- Location: Newton County
- Length: 14.097 mi (22.687 km)
- Existed: 1959–present

== RM 2627 ==
Ranch to Market Road 2627
- Location: Brewster County
- Length: 14.097 mi (22.687 km)
- Existed: June 28, 1963–present

Ranch to Market Road 2627 (RM 2627) is located in Brewster County.

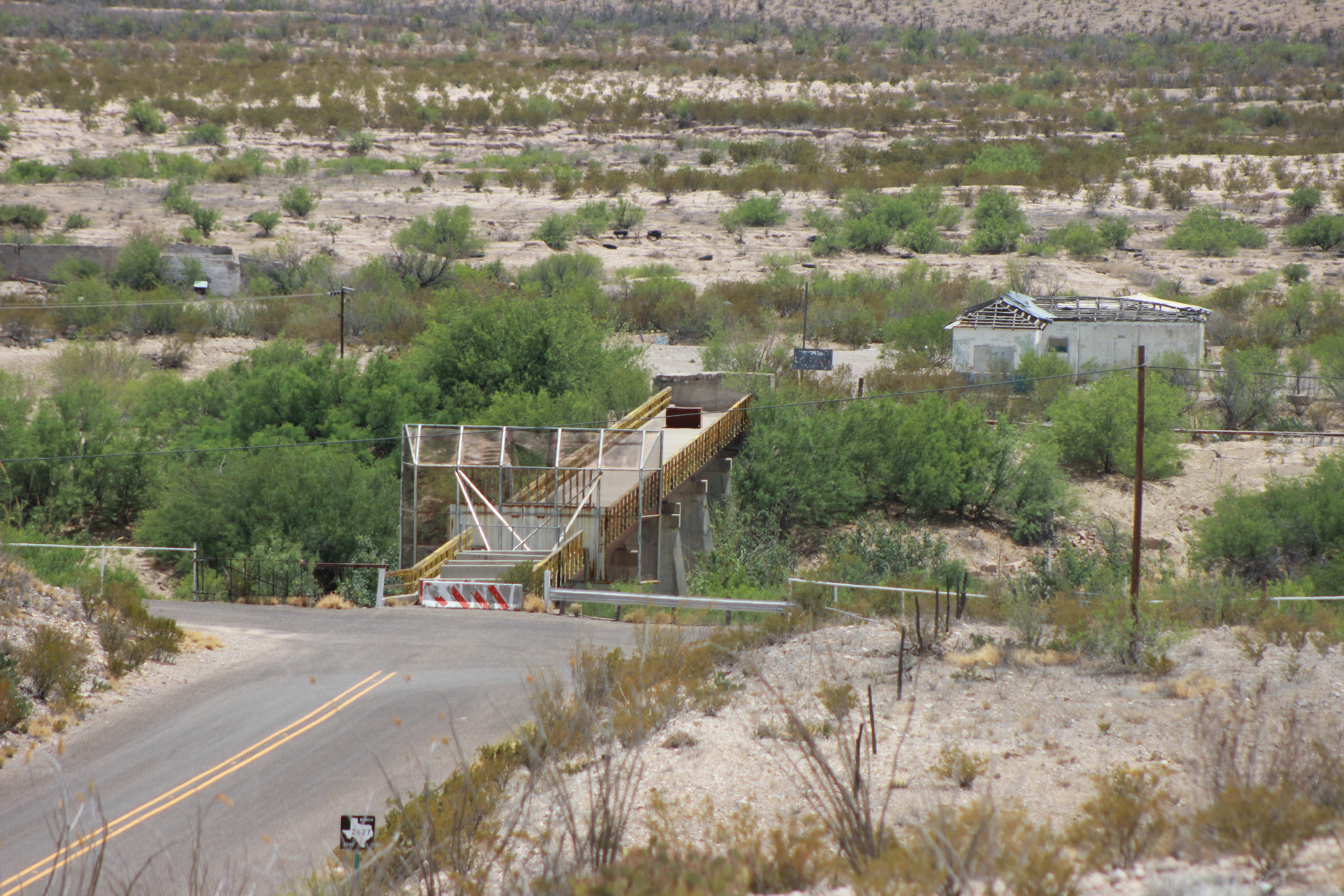
The southern terminus of RM 2627 at La Linda International Bridge

The southern terminus of RM 2627 is at La Linda International Bridge across the Rio Grande, which has been closed since 1997. The route travels northwest and traverses Black Gap Wildlife Management area before ending at US 385, less than one mile (1.6 km) north of the entrance to Big Bend National Park and 38 miles (61 km) south of Marathon.

The current RM 2627 was designated on June 28, 1963. The route originally ran from US 385 to the southeast 19 miles (31 km). The route was extended to its current terminus on May 6, 1964.

=== FM 2627 ===
Farm to Market Road 2627
- Location: Cass County
- Existed: November 24, 1959–September 18, 1962

A previous route designated Farm to Market Road 2627 (FM 2627) was established in Cass County on November 24, 1959, running from US 59 in Linden eastward 6.0 miles (9.7 km) to a road intersection near Center Hill. On September 27, 1960, the route was extended eastward to FM 248 in Bivins. FM 2627's mileage was transferred to FM 1841 on September 18, 1962.

== FM 2628 ==
Farm to Market Road 2628
- Location: Walker County
- Length: 3.417 mi (5.499 km)
- Existed: December 14, 1977–present

Farm to Market Road 2628 (FM 2628) is located in Walker County. It runs from FM 247 north of Huntsville to FM 980.

FM 2628 was designated on December 14, 1977, on its current route.

=== FM 2628 (1959) ===
Farm to Market Road 2628
- Location: Tyler County
- Existed: November 24, 1959–December 17, 1969

The first use of the FM 2628 designation was in Tyler County, from US 69, 2.2 miles (3.5 km) north of Colmesneil, to a point 4.4 miles (7.1 km) east. FM 2628 was cancelled on December 17, 1969, and became a portion of FM 255 (now RE 255).

=== FM 2628 (1970) ===
Farm to Market Road 2628
- Location: Freestone County
- Existed: May 7, 1970–October 31, 1977

The next use of the FM 2628 designation was in Freestone County, from FM 489 at Lanely to a point 4.0 miles (6.4 km). FM 2628 was cancelled on October 31, 1977, and became a portion of FM 1848.

== FM 2629 ==
Farm to Market Road 2629
- Location: Hidalgo, Cameron, and Willacy counties
- Length: 12.799 mi (Note: The certified length given is shorter than the actual mileage, as the Texas Department of Transportation description of FM 2629 considers it to be discontinuous at rather than concurrent with FM 506 and Spur 413.) (20.598 km)
- Existed: November 24, 1959–present

Farm to Market Road 2629 (FM 2629) is located in Hidalgo, Cameron, and Willacy counties in the Lower Rio Grande Valley.

FM 2629 begins at an intersection with FM 491 northeast of La Villa. The highway travels in an eastern direction, intersecting FM 1425 on the Hidalgo–Cameron county line. FM 2629 intersects FM 2845 south of Zapata Ranch, then has an overlap with FM 506 and Spur 413 through the town of Sebastian. The highway turns south just east of I-69E / US 77, then turns back east at County Line Road, running along the Cameron–Willacy county line, ending at an intersection with FM 507.

FM 2629 was designated on November 24, 1959, from FM 491 eastward to the Cameron County line, then eastward near and along the Cameron–Willacy county line to FM 506 at a distance of 4.9 miles (7.9 km). The highway was extended 8.2 miles (13.2 km) eastward to FM 507 on May 5, 1966.

Junction list

County	Location	mi	km	Destinations	Notes
Hidalgo		0.0	0.0	FM 491 – La Villa	
Hidalgo–Cameron county line		2.1	3.4	FM 1425 (Sugar Mill Road) – Heidelberg	
Willacy–Cameron county line		4.2	6.8	FM 2845 north – Zapata Ranch	
Willacy	Sebastian	4.8	7.7	FM 506 south – Santa Rosa	West end of FM 506 overlap
Willacy	Sebastian	5.3	8.5	FM 1834 north	
Willacy	Sebastian	6.7	10.8	Bus. US 77 / FM 506 / Spur 413 – Lyford, Harlingen	East end of FM 506 overlap; west end of Spur 413 overlap
Willacy	Sebastian	7.0	11.3	I-69E / US 77 / Spur 413 – Raymondville, Harlingen	I-69E exit 38; east end of Spur 413 overlap
Willacy–Cameron county line		14.9	24.0	FM 507 – Harlingen	
1.000 mi = 1.609 km; 1.000 km = 0.621 mi: Concurrency terminus

== RM 2630 ==
Ranch to Market Road 2630
- Location: Edwards County
- Length: 4.992 mi (8.034 km)
- Existed: 1959–present

== RM 2631 ==
Ranch to Market Road 2631
- Location: Real County
- Length: 8.542 mi (13.747 km)
- Existed: 1959–present

== FM 2632 ==
Farm to Market Road 2632
- Location: Brown County
- Length: 5.727 mi (9.217 km)
- Existed: November 24, 1959–present

Farm to Market Road 2632 (FM 2632) is located in Brown County. Its southern terminus is at SH 279 northwest of Brownwood. It runs north 5.7 miles (9.2 km), intersecting FM 2125 and FM 3021, before state maintenance ends along the south shore of Lake Brownwood. The roadway continues as CR 464.

FM 2632 was designated on November 24, 1959, along the current route.

== FM 2633 ==
Farm to Market Road 2633
- Location: Coleman County
- Length: 13.505 mi (21.734 km)
- Existed: 1959–present

== FM 2634 ==
Farm to Market Road 2634
- Location: Montague County
- Length: 3.707 mi (5.966 km)
- Existed: January 31, 1961–present

Farm to Market Road 2634 (FM 2634) is located in Montague County.

FM 2634 begins at an intersection with FM 103, heading east to an intersection with FM 3428. The highway then intersects FM 2953 and heads southeast. FM 2634 curves eastward before ending at Weldon Robb Park on Lake Nocona.

FM 2634 was designated on January 31, 1961, on the current route.

Junction list

The entire route is in Montague County.

Location	mi	km	Destinations	Notes
0.0	0.0	FM 103 – Nocona, Spanish Fort		
2.0	3.2	FM 3428 south	Northern terminus of FM 3428	
2.8	4.5	FM 2953 east	Western terminus of FM 2953	
3.7	6.0	Weldon Robb Park		
1.000 mi = 1.609 km; 1.000 km = 0.621 mi

=== FM 2634 (1959) ===
Farm to Market Road 2634
- Location: Comanche County
- Existed: November 24, 1959–October 14, 1960

FM 2634 was first designated on November 24, 1959, for a road in Comanche County running from SH 36 in Comanche northeast 5.7 miles (9.2 km). On October 14, 1960, the FM 2634 designation on this road was replaced with FM 1689.

== FM 2635 ==
Farm to Market Road 2635
- Location: McCulloch County
- Length: 5.472 mi (8.806 km)
- Existed: 1959–present

== FM 2636 ==
Farm to Market Road 2636
- Location: Henderson County
- Length: 3.082 mi (4.960 km)
- Existed: October 30, 1961–present

=== FM 2636 (1959) ===
Farm to Market Road 2636
- Location: Hudspeth County
- Existed: November 24, 1959–October 17, 1960

A previous route numbered FM 2636 was designated in Hudspeth County on November 24, 1959, from US 62/US 180 near Salt Flat to a point 4.0 miles (6.4 km) north. FM 2636 was cancelled on October 17, 1960, and transferred to FM 1576.

== FM 2637 ==
Farm to Market Road 2637
- Location: El Paso County
- Length: 0.728 mi (1,172 m)
- Existed: 1959–present

Farm to Market Road 2637 (FM 2637) is located in El Paso County, in the city of El Paso.

FM 2637 begins at an intersection with FM 2529 (McCombs Street) in the northern part of the city. The roadway travels east before ending at a dead end.

FM 2637 was designated on November 24, 1959, along its current route.

== FM 2638 ==
Farm to Market Road 2638
- Location: Childress County
- Length: 4.676 mi (7.525 km)
- Existed: 1959–present

== FM 2639 ==
Farm to Market Road 2639
- Location: Hall County
- Length: 3.378 mi (5.436 km)
- Existed: 1959–present

== FM 2640 ==
Farm to Market Road 2640
- Location: Hardeman County
- Length: 3.25 mi (5.23 km)
- Existed: 1959–present

== FM 2641 ==
Farm to Market Road 2641
- Location: Hockley and Lubbock counties
- Length: 20.79 mi (33.46 km)
- Existed: September 20, 1961–present

Farm to Market Road 2641 (FM 2641) is located in the Lubbock metropolitan area. It is known locally as Regis Street.

FM 2641 begins at an intersection with FM 2130 south of Roundup in Hockley. The highway travels east before intersecting FM 2378 and crossing into Lubbock County. FM 2641 continues traveling east and intersects with FM 179 and US 84 near Shallowater. The highway intersects FM 2525 (N. Frankford Avenue) and FM 1264 (N. University Avenue) before entering the city limits of Lubbock. FM 2641 crosses I-27/US 87 and runs just south of Lubbock Preston Smith International Airport before leaving the city limits. The highway ends at an intersection with US 62/US 84/SH 114 just east of the city.

The current FM 2641 was designated on September 20, 1961, running from FM 2130 to US 84. The highway was further extended east on July 11, 1968, to US 87 (later I-27) and later to US 62/US 82/SH 114 (Idalou Road) on September 5, 1973. On June 27, 1995, the section of FM 2641 from FM 1264 to Idalou Road was redesignated Urban Road 2641 (UR 2641). The designation reverted to FM 2641 with the elimination of the Urban Road system on November 15, 2018.

Junction list

County	Location	mi	km	Destinations	Notes
Hockley		0.0	0.0	FM 2130 – Roundup	
Hockley		1.5	2.4	FM 2378	
Lubbock		5.5	8.9	FM 179 – Shallowater, Wolfforth	
Lubbock		9.0	14.5	US 84 – Shallowater, Lubbock	
Lubbock		9.5	15.3	FM 2528	
Lubbock		13.5	21.7	FM 1264	
Lubbock	Lubbock	15.6	25.1	I-27 / US 87 – Amarillo, Lubbock	I-27 exit 8
Lubbock		20.8	33.5	US 62 / US 82 / SH 114 (Idalou Road) – Idalou, Lubbock	
1.000 mi = 1.609 km; 1.000 km = 0.621 mi

=== FM 2641 (1959) ===
Farm to Market Road 2641
- Location: Motley County
- Existed: November 24, 1959–October 18, 1960

A previous route numbered FM 2641 was designated on November 24, 1959, running from FM 94 at Northfield northwestward at a distance of 3.0 miles (4.8 km). The highway was cancelled on October 18, 1960, with the mileage being transferred to FM 656.

== FM 2642 ==
Farm to Market Road 2642
- Location: Hunt County
- Length: 2.593 mi (4.173 km)
- Existed: 1959–present

== FM 2643 ==
Farm to Market Road 2643
- Location: McLennan and Falls counties
- Length: 10.781 mi (17.350 km)
- Existed: 1959–present

== FM 2644 ==
Farm to Market Road 2644
- Location: Maverick and Dimmit counties
- Length: 27.159 mi (43.708 km)
- Existed: January 19, 1960–present

Farm to Market Road 2644 (FM 2644) is located in Maverick and Dimmit counties. It runs west–east from FM 1021 in El Indio to US 277 northwest of Carrizo Springs.

FM 2644 was designated on January 19, 1960, from US 277 westward 7.0 miles (11.3 km), and was lengthened westward by 1.1 miles (1.8 km) on September 27 of that year. It was extended to its current western terminus at FM 1021 on June 28, 1963.

== FM 2645 ==
Farm to Market Road 2645
- Location: Fannin County
- Length: 5.07 mi (8.16 km)
- Existed: 1960–present

== FM 2646 ==
Farm to Market Road 2646
- Location: Hockley County
- Length: 12.708 mi (20.452 km)
- Existed: 1960–present

Farm to Market Road 2646 (FM 2646) is located in Hockley County.

FM 2646 begins at an intersection with FM 1585. The highway travels north, intersecting SH 114 between Opdyke West and Smyer. FM 2646 ends at an intersection with FM 1294.

FM 2646 was designated on September 27, 1960, running from SH 116 (now SH 114) southward to FM 1585 at a distance of 7.0 miles (11.3 km). The highway was extended 5.8 miles (9.3 km) northward from SH 116 to FM 1294 on June 28, 1963.

== FM 2647 ==
Farm to Market Road 2647
- Location: Runnels County
- Length: 12.821 mi (20.633 km)
- Existed: 1960–present

== FM 2648 ==
Farm to Market Road 2648
- Location: Lamar County
- Length: 8.821 mi (14.196 km)
- Existed: 1960–present

== FM 2649 ==
Farm to Market Road 2649
- Location: Hunt County
- Length: 8.402 mi (13.522 km)
- Existed: June 28, 1963–present

Farm to Market Road 2649 (FM 2649) is located in Hunt County.

FM 2649 begins at an intersection with FM 1567. The highway travels in a northern direction through rural farming areas, ending at an intersection with the eastbound frontage road of I-30 between Campbell and Cumby.

The current FM 2649 was designated on June 28, 1963, from FM 1567 northward to I-30.

=== FM 2649 (1960) ===
Farm to Market Road 2649
- Location: Cooke County
- Existed: September 27, 1960–May 25, 1962

A previous route numbered FM 2649 was designated on September 27, 1960, running from FM 1630 south of Myra, southward to a road intersection at a distance of 2.8 miles (4.5 km). The highway was cancelled on May 25, 1962, with the mileage being transferred to FM 1198.

== FM 2650 ==
Farm to Market Road 2650
- Location: Archer and Wichita counties
- Length: 4.32 mi (Note: The certified length given is shorter than the actual mileage, as the Texas Department of Transportation description of FM 2650 considers it to be discontinuous at rather than concurrent with FM 369.) (6.95 km)
- Existed: 1960–present

Farm to Market Road 2650 (FM 2650) is located in Archer and Wichita counties.

FM 2650 begins at an intersection with FM 1954. The highway travels in a northern direction through a semi-suburban area and crosses over Lake Wichita. FM 2650 enters Wichita Falls in the Allendale area, has an overlap with FM 368, then ends at a junction with US 82 / US 277 / Bus. US 277. The section of highway south of FM 369 is known locally as Sisk Road, while north of FM 369 it is known as Allendale Road.

FM 2650 was designated on September 27, 1960, running from FM 368 southward to FM 1954 at a distance of 3.6 miles (5.8 km). The highway was extended 0.8 miles (1.3 km) northward from FM 368 to US 82 on May 7, 1974. On June 27, 1995, the section of FM 2650 between FM 368 and US 82 was redesignated Urban Road 2650 (UR 2650). The designation reverted to FM 2650 with the elimination of the Urban Road system on November 15, 2018.

Junction list

County	Location	mi	km	Destinations	Notes
Archer		0.0	0.0	FM 1954	
Wichita	Wichita Falls	3.5	5.6	FM 369 west (Southwest Parkway)	South end of FM 369 overlap
Wichita	Wichita Falls	4.0	6.4	FM 369 east (Southwest Parkway)	North end of FM 369 overlap
Wichita	Wichita Falls	4.8	7.7	US 82 / US 277 (Kell Boulevard) / Bus. US 277 (Seymour Highway)	Interchange
1.000 mi = 1.609 km; 1.000 km = 0.621 mi: Concurrency terminus

== FM 2651 ==
Farm to Market Road 2651
- Location: Throckmorton County
- Length: 3.747 mi (6.030 km)
- Existed: 1960–present

== FM 2652 ==
Farm to Market Road 2652
- Location: Young County
- Length: 15.528 mi (24.990 km)
- Existed: 1960–present

== FM 2653 ==
Farm to Market Road 2653
- Location: Hopkins County
- Length: 18.252 mi (Note: The certified length given is shorter than the actual mileage, as the Texas Department of Transportation description of FM 2653 considers it to be discontinuous at rather than concurrent with US 67.) (29.374 km)
- Existed: 1960–present

Farm to Market Road 2653 (FM 2653) is located in Hopkins County.

FM 2653 begins at an intersection with FM 275 north of Miller Grove. The highway travels in an eastern direction, turning north at County Road 1152, then briefly runs in a northeastern direction at County Road 1127. FM 2653 continues to alternate between running in an eastern and northern direction until reaching Brasher, having a short overlap with US 67 through the town, then having a junction with I-30 just outside of the town. The highway turns northwest at County Road 4715, turning back north near SH 11. FM 2653 continues to travel in a northern direction through rural farming areas, ending at an intersection with FM 71.

FM 2653 was designated on October 13, 1960, traveling from FM 71 southward to US 67 at Brashear at a distance of 10.0 miles (16.1 km) replacing a portion of FM 71. The highway was extended 8.0 miles (12.9 km) south of US 67 to FM 275 on May 2, 1962.

Junction list

The entire route is in Hopkins County.

Location	mi	km	Destinations	Notes
	0.0	0.0	FM 275 – Cumby, Miller Grove	
Brashear	8.7	14.0	US 67 south	South end of US 67 overlap
Brashear	9.0	14.5	US 67 north to I-30 east – Sulphur Springs	North end of US 67 overlap
	9.3	15.0	I-30 – Dallas, Greenville, Sulphur Springs	I-30 exit 116
	14.3	23.0	SH 11 – Commerce, Sulphur Springs	
	18.6	29.9	FM 71 – Commerce	
1.000 mi = 1.609 km; 1.000 km = 0.621 mi: Concurrency terminus

== RM 2654 ==
Ranch to Market Road 2654
- Location: Hemphill County
- Length: 8.262 mi (13.296 km)
- Existed: 1960–present

== FM 2655 ==
Farm to Market Road 2655
- Location: Hunt County
- Length: 3.901 mi (6.278 km)
- Existed: May 6, 1964–present

=== RM 2655 ===
Ranch to Market Road 2655
- Location: Hutchinson County
- Existed: September 27, 1960–March 10, 1964

A previous route numbered RM 2655 was designated on September 27, 1960, traveling from SH 152 near Stinnett southward at a distance of 3.5 miles (5.6 km). The highway was cancelled on March 10, 1964, with the mileage being transferred to RM 687.

== FM 2656 ==
Farm to Market Road 2656
- Location: DeWitt County
- Length: 6.741 mi (10.849 km)
- Existed: 1960–present

== FM 2657 ==
Farm to Market Road 2657
- Location: Burnet and Lampasas counties
- Length: 16.908 mi (27.211 km)
- Existed: June 2, 1967 (Note: FM 2657 was originally designated as RM 2657 from 1967 to 1992.)–present

Farm to Market Road 2657 (FM 2657) is located in Burnet and Lampasas counties.

FM 2657 begins in Briggs at an intersection with Loop 308, the old alignment of US 183 through the community. The route runs briefly to the northeast and then to the north through unincorporated Burnet County. It intersects RM 963 before entering southern Lampasas County. FM 2657 ends at an intersection with US 190 in Copperas Cove, just west of the Coryell County line.

FM 2657 was designated on June 2, 1967, as Ranch to Market Road 2657 (RM 2657), replacing the southern section of RM 963 to Briggs and the northern section of FM 2808 to Copperas Cove. It was redesignated as FM 2657 on May 5, 1992.

Junction list

County	Location	mi	km	Destinations	Notes
Burnet	Briggs	0.0	0.0	Loop 308 to US 183	Southern terminus
Burnet		8.3	13.4	RM 963 – Oakalla	
Lampasas		15.1	24.3	FM 2808 – Kempner	
Lampasas		15.6	25.1	FM 3046	
Lampasas	Copperas Cove	16.9	27.2	US 190 / Future I-14 – Lampasas, Killeen	Northern terminus
1.000 mi = 1.609 km; 1.000 km = 0.621 mi

=== FM 2657 (1960) ===
Farm to Market Road 2657
- Location: Gregg and Harrison counties
- Existed: September 27, 1960–October 17, 1966

The first FM 2657 was designated in Gregg County on September 27, 1960, from SH 26 (now US 259) to the Harrison County line. On May 2, 1962, the route was extended east to FM 2208 in Harrison County. On October 17, 1966, that route became part of FM 449.

== FM 2658 ==
Farm to Market Road 2658
- Location: Rusk County
- Length: 6.539 mi (10.524 km)
- Existed: 1960–present

== FM 2659 ==
Farm to Market Road 2659
- Location: Wood County
- Length: 6.296 mi (10.132 km)
- Existed: 1960–present

== FM 2660 ==
Farm to Market Road 2660
- Location: Jones County
- Length: 4.477 mi (7.205 km)
- Existed: 1960–present

== FM 2661 ==
Farm to Market Road 2661
- Location: Smith County
- Length: 12.996 mi (20.915 km)
- Existed: 1960–present

Farm to Market Road 2661 (FM 2661) is located in Smith County. The 13-mile (21 km) route runs from SH 64 at its northern terminus to SH 155 at its southern terminus; from that point it continues southward as FM 344. It intersects SH 31 about midway in its routing.

The road passes along the eastern side of Lake Palestine and mainly serves as the route to Holiday Inn Vacation Club's The Villages timeshare resort as well as Pine Cove, a popular Christian camp.

FM 2661 was designated on September 27, 1960, from SH 64 to SH 31. On August 2, 1968, FM 2661 was extended south to SH 155.

== FM 2662 ==
Farm to Market Road 2662
- Location: Coke County
- Length: 9.45 mi (15.21 km)
- Existed: June 1, 1965–present

=== FM 2662 (1960) ===
Farm to Market Road 2662
- Location: Angelina County
- Existed: September 27, 1960–October 14, 1964

A previous route numbered FM 2662 was designated on September 27, 1960, from SH 63 in Zavalla north 3.5 miles (5.6 km) to 0.6 miles (0.97 km) north of Pophers Creek. On July 25, 1961, the northern terminus was moved, shortening the route by 0.1 miles (0.16 km). FM 2662 was cancelled on October 14, 1964, and transferred to FM 2109.

== FM 2663 ==
Farm to Market Road 2663
- Location: Houston County
- Length: 4.409 mi (7.096 km)
- Existed: 1960–present

== FM 2664 ==
Farm to Market Road 2664
- Location: Nacogdoches County
- Length: 2.248 mi (3.618 km)
- Existed: 1960–present

== FM 2665 ==
Farm to Market Road 2665
- Location: Polk County
- Length: 8.368 mi (13.467 km)
- Existed: 1960–present

== FM 2666 ==
Farm to Market Road 2666
- Location: San Jacinto County
- Length: 7.253 mi (11.673 km)
- Existed: 1960–present

== FM 2667 ==
Farm to Market Road 2667
- Location: Shelby County
- Length: 3.348 mi (5.388 km)
- Existed: 1960–present

== FM 2668 ==
Farm to Market Road 2668
- Location: Matagorda County
- Length: 13.772 mi (22.164 km)
- Existed: 1960–present

== FM 2669 ==
Farm to Market Road 2669
- Location: Shelby County
- Length: 1.483 mi (2.387 km)
- Existed: 1960–present

== FM 2670 ==
Farm to Market Road 2670
- Location: Bell County
- Length: 3.887 mi (6.256 km)
- Existed: 1960–present

== FM 2671 ==
Farm to Market Road 2671
- Location: McLennan and Coryell counties
- Length: 6.908 mi (11.117 km)
- Existed: 1960–present

== FM 2672 ==
Farm to Market Road 2672
- Location: Fayette County
- Length: 5.336 mi (8.587 km)
- Existed: 1960–present

== FM 2673 ==
Farm to Market Road 2673
- Location: Comal County
- Length: 10.019 mi (16.124 km)
- Existed: September 27, 1960–present

Farm to Market Road 2673 (FM 2673) is a 10.019-mile (16.124 km) state road in Canyon Lake, Comal County, that connects Cranes Mill Road (at a point roughly 300 feet [91 m] north of Pegg Ranch road) with Farm to Market Road 306.

== FM 2674 ==
Farm to Market Road 2674
- Location: Wharton County
- Length: 6.014 mi (9.679 km)
- Existed: 1960–present

== FM 2675 ==
Farm to Market Road 2675
- Location: Lamar and Delta counties
- Length: 6.852 mi (11.027 km)
- Existed: June 28, 1963–present

=== FM 2675 (1960) ===
Farm to Market Road 2675
- Location: Guadalupe and Comal counties
- Existed: September 27, 1960–May 28, 1961

A previous route numbered FM 2675 was designated on September 27, 1960, from SH 123, 0.9 miles (1.4 km) south of Zorn, west 4.1 miles (6.6 km) to County Road. FM 2675 was cancelled on May 28, 1961, and transferred to FM 1101.

== FM 2676 ==
Farm to Market Road 2676
- Location: Medina County
- Length: 17.662 mi (28.424 km)
- Existed: 1960–present

== FM 2677 ==
Farm to Market Road 2677
- Location: Sherman County
- Length: 11.187 mi (18.004 km)
- Existed: May 2, 1962–present

=== FM 2677 (1960) ===
Farm to Market Road 2677
- Location: Grimes County
- Existed: September 27, 1960–October 31, 1961

A previous route numbered FM 2677 was designated on September 27, 1960, from SH 45 (now SH 30), 3 miles (4.8 km) northeast of Shiro, north 3.6 miles (5.8 km) to a road intersection. FM 2677 was cancelled on October 31, 1961, and transferred to FM 2620.

== FM 2678 ==
Farm to Market Road 2678
- Location: Refugio County
- Length: 9.571 mi (15.403 km)
- Existed: 1960–present

== FM 2679 ==
Farm to Market Road 2679
- Location: Washington County
- Length: 5.242 mi (8.436 km)
- Existed: 1960–present

== FM 2680 ==
Farm to Market Road 2680
- Location: Angelina County
- Length: 1.161 mi (1.868 km)
- Existed: January 26, 1962–present

=== FM 2680 (1960) ===
Farm to Market Road 2680
- Location: Camp County
- Existed: September 27, 1960–October 9, 1961

A previous route numbered FM 2680 was designated on September 27, 1960, from SH 11 in Leesburg northwest 3.4 miles (5.5 km) to a county road 1.8 miles (2.9 km) north of Newsome. On September 20, 1961, the road was extended northwest to FM 1448. FM 2680 was cancelled on October 9, 1961, and transferred to FM 1519.

== FM 2681 ==
Farm to Market Road 2681
- Location: Limestone County
- Length: 1.324 mi (2.131 km)
- Existed: December 13, 1962–present

=== FM 2681 (1960) ===
Farm to Market Road 2681
- Location: Titus County
- Existed: September 27, 1960–May 25, 1962

A previous route numbered FM 2681 was designated on September 27, 1960, from FM 71 at Wilkinson, south 3.2 miles (5.1 km) to a county road. FM 2681 was cancelled on May 25, 1962, and transferred to FM 1402.

== FM 2682 ==
Farm to Market Road 2682
- Location: Harrison County
- Length: 2.802 mi (4.509 km)
- Existed: 1960–present

== FM 2683 ==
Farm to Market Road 2683
- Location: Cass and Marion County
- Length: 11.094 mi (17.854 km)
- Existed: 1960–present

== FM 2684 ==
Farm to Market Road 2684
- Location: Liberty County
- Length: 2.081 mi (3.349 km)
- Existed: 1960–present

== FM 2685 ==
Farm to Market Road 2685
- Location: Upshur County
- Length: 10.614 mi (17.082 km)
- Existed: 1960–present

== FM 2686 ==
Farm to Market Road 2686
- Location: Starr County
- Length: 18.114 mi (29.152 km)
- Existed: 1960–present

== FM 2687 ==
Farm to Market Road 2687
- Location: Zapata and Jim Hogg counties
- Length: 18.139 mi (29.192 km)
- Existed: 1960–present

Farm to Market Road 2687 (FM 2687) is located in Zapata and Jim Hogg counties. It runs from US 83 at Chihuahua Farm northeastward to FM 649 near Guerra.

FM 2687 was designated on September 27, 1960, from US 83 northeastward approximately 8.3 miles (13.4 km). It was extended to FM 649 on May 2, 1962.

== FM 2688 ==
Farm to Market Road 2688
- Location: Dimmit County
- Length: 13.122 mi (21.118 km)
- Existed: 1960–present

== FM 2689 ==
Farm to Market Road 2689
- Location: Eastland County
- Length: 7.805 mi (12.561 km)
- Existed: 1960–present

== RM 2690 ==
Ranch to Market Road 2690
- Location: Uvalde County
- Length: 11.421 mi (18.380 km)
- Existed: 1960–present

== FM 2691 ==
Farm to Market Road 2691
- Location: Zavala County
- Length: 8.591 mi (13.826 km)
- Existed: 1960–present

== RM 2692 ==
Ranch to Market Road 2692
- Location: Palo Pinto County
- Length: 8.047 mi (12.950 km)
- Existed: August 27, 1963–present

=== FM 2692 ===
Farm to Market Road 2692
- Location: Comanche County
- Existed: October 28, 1960–May 24, 1962

Farm to Market Road 2692 (FM 2692) was designated on October 28, 1960 from FM 587 west of DeLeon to a point 3.0 miles (4.8 km) southwest. FM 2692 was cancelled on May 24, 1962, and transferred to FM 2318.

== FM 2693 ==
Farm to Market Road 2693
- Location: San Jacinto and Walker counties
- Length: 10.521 mi (16.932 km)
- Existed: 1960–present

== FM 2694 ==
Farm to Market Road 2694
- Location: Shelby County
- Length: 13.304 mi (21.411 km)
- Existed: 1960–present

== FM 2695 ==
Farm to Market Road 2695
- Location: Shelby County
- Length: 0.455 mi (732 m)
- Existed: October 29, 1992–present

=== RM 2695 ===
Ranch to Market Road 2695
- Location: Gray and Donley counties
- Existed: February 22, 1961–August 29, 1990

A previous route numbered RM 2695 was designated on February 22, 1961, from a point at near the intersection of SH 273/US 66 at McLean south 8.5 miles (13.7 km) to a county road 5 miles (8.0 km) south of the Gray–Donley county line. The road was extended south 7.4 miles (11.9 km) on May 2, 1962, and south another 11.3 miles (18.2 km) to SH 203 on June 26, 1962. On November 1, 1962, the southern terminus was relocated to SH 203, 6 miles (9.7 km) northeast of Hedley, shortening the route 3.3 miles (5.3 km) miles, but 3.1 miles (5.0 km) were added back on June 2, 1964, when the southern terminus was moved to SH 203 1.5 miles (2.4 km) east of Hedley. RM 2695 was cancelled on August 29, 1990, and transferred to SH 273.

== FM 2696 ==
Farm to Market Road 2696
- Location: Bexar County
- Length: 16.028 mi (25.795 km)
- Existed: March 22, 1961–present

== FM 2697 ==
Farm to Market Road 2697
- Location: Wheeler County
- Length: 4.036 mi (6.495 km)
- Existed: May 20, 1961–present

=== FM 2697 (1962) ===
Farm to Market Road 2697
- Location: Hale County
- Existed: September 20, 1961–1961

The original FM 2967 was planned to run from SH 194 at Edmonson south 6 miles to US 70. This was cancelled as it was already part of FM 1424.

== FM 2698 ==
Farm to Market Road 2698
- Location: Swisher County
- Length: 4.352 mi (7.004 km)
- Existed: 1961–present

Farm to Market Road 2698 (FM 2698) is located in Swisher County.

FM 2698 begins at a junction with I-27 / US 87 in a rural part of the county. The highway travels in an eastern direction through rural, unincorporated areas of the county, passes the Wrangler Feedyards, ending at an intersection with FM 146 north of Tulia.

FM 2698 was designated on September 20, 1961, along the current route.

== RM 2699 ==
Ranch to Market Road 2699
- Location: Roberts County
- Length: 7.223 mi (11.624 km)
- Existed: May 2, 1962–present

=== FM 2699 (1961) ===
Farm to Market Road 2699
- Location: Concho and Tom Green County
- Existed: September 20, 1961–October 1961

Farm to Market Road 2699 (FM 2699) was a short-lived farm to market road running from FM 381 to FM 1692. This became part of FM 1929 within a month.
