= Farm to Market Road 1954 =

Road in Texas

Farm to Market Road 1954

Route information
- Maintained by TxDOT
- Length: 23.203 mi (37.342 km)
- Existed: 1952–present

Major junctions
- West end: FM 368 in Holliday
- SH 79 south of Lakeside City; US 281
- East end: FM 2393 north of Lake Arrowhead State Park

Location
- Country: United States
- State: Texas
- Counties: Archer, Clay

Highway system
- Highways in Texas; Interstate; US; State; Former; Toll; Loops; Spurs; FM/RM; Park; Rec
← FM 1953	→ FM 1955

Farm to Market Road 1954 (FM 1954) is a farm to market road in Archer and Clay counties, Texas.

== Route description ==
FM 1954's western terminus is at FM 368 in the southern outskirts of Holliday in Archer County. The roadway travels to the east and briefly turns to the north to intersect FM 440 before resuming its primarily eastward trajectory. It intersects SH 79 south of Lakeside City and Lake Wichita before crossing US 281 and entering Clay County. The roadway then turns to the south at a junction with FM 2393 to provide access to Lake Arrowhead State Park via PR 63. Here the route turns back to the north and reaches its eastern terminus at another junction with FM 2393.

== History ==
FM 1954 was first designated on February 24, 1952. Its western terminus has always been at FM 368 at Holliday, and its original east end was at SH 79. The route was lengthened to US 281 on May 2, 1962. The extension into Clay county and to Lake Arrowhead State Park occurred on January 16, 1968, and the roadway ended within the park. This stub end became part of PR 63 on January 31, 1973. On September 5, 1973, FM 1954 was extended northward to its current terminus at its second intersection with FM 2393.

== Major intersections ==
County	Location	mi	km	Destinations	Notes
Archer	Holliday	0.0	0.0	FM 368 (S. College Ave.) – Lake Kickapoo	Western terminus
Archer		2.2	3.5	FM 2224	
Archer		4.2	6.8	FM 440 – Holliday	
Archer		5.7	9.2	FM 2650 – Wichita Falls	
Archer		8.9	14.3	SH 79 – Lakeside City, Wichita Falls	
Archer		12.9	20.8	US 281 – Jacksboro, Wichita Falls	
Clay		17.1	27.5	FM 2393	
Clay	Lake Arrowhead State Park	20.1	32.3	PR 63	
Clay		20.7	33.3	FM 2606	
Clay		23.2	37.3	FM 2393 – Jolly	Eastern Terminus
1.000 mi = 1.609 km; 1.000 km = 0.621 mi
