= Lake Arrowhead (Texas) =

Lake in Clay County, Texas

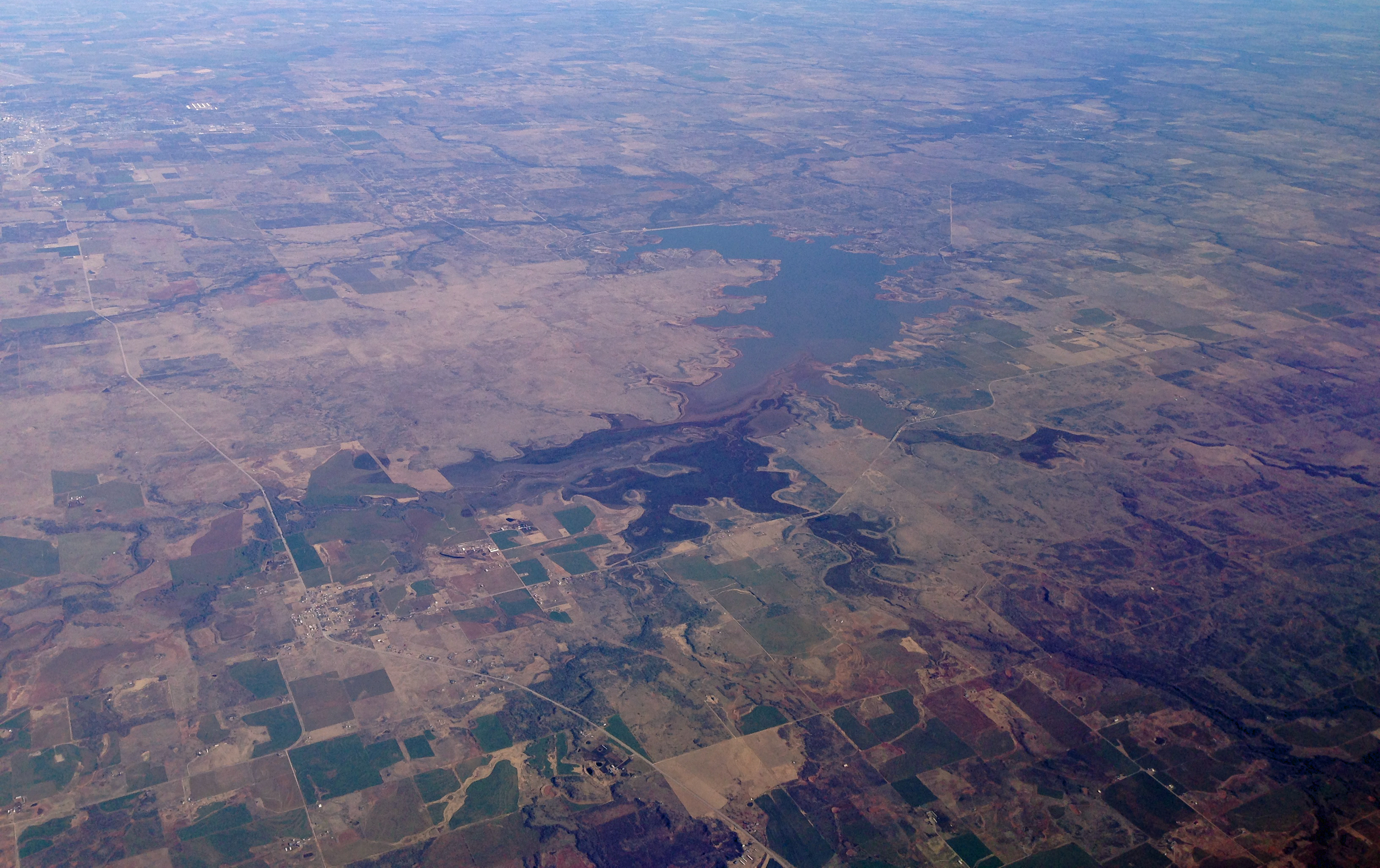
- Lake Arrowhead

- Location within Texas Location within the United States
- Location: Wichita Falls, Texas
- Coordinates: 33°42′14.8″N 98°22′33.4″W
- Type: Manmade lake
- Part of: Lake Arrowhead State Park
- Basin countries: United States
- Managing agency: Texas Parks and Wildlife Department
- First flooded: 1966
- Surface area: 14,969 acres (6,058 ha)
- Average depth: 16 feet (4.9 m)
- Max. depth: 45 feet (14 m)
- Surface elevation: 926 feet (282 m)
- Website: Texas PWD
- References: U.S. Geological Survey Geographic Names Information System: Lake Arrowhead

Lake Arrowhead is a lake located south-east of Wichita Falls, Texas. The lake was created by damming the Little Wichita River to provide drinking water for the city of Wichita Falls.

The Lake Arrowhead State Park is based around the lake.
