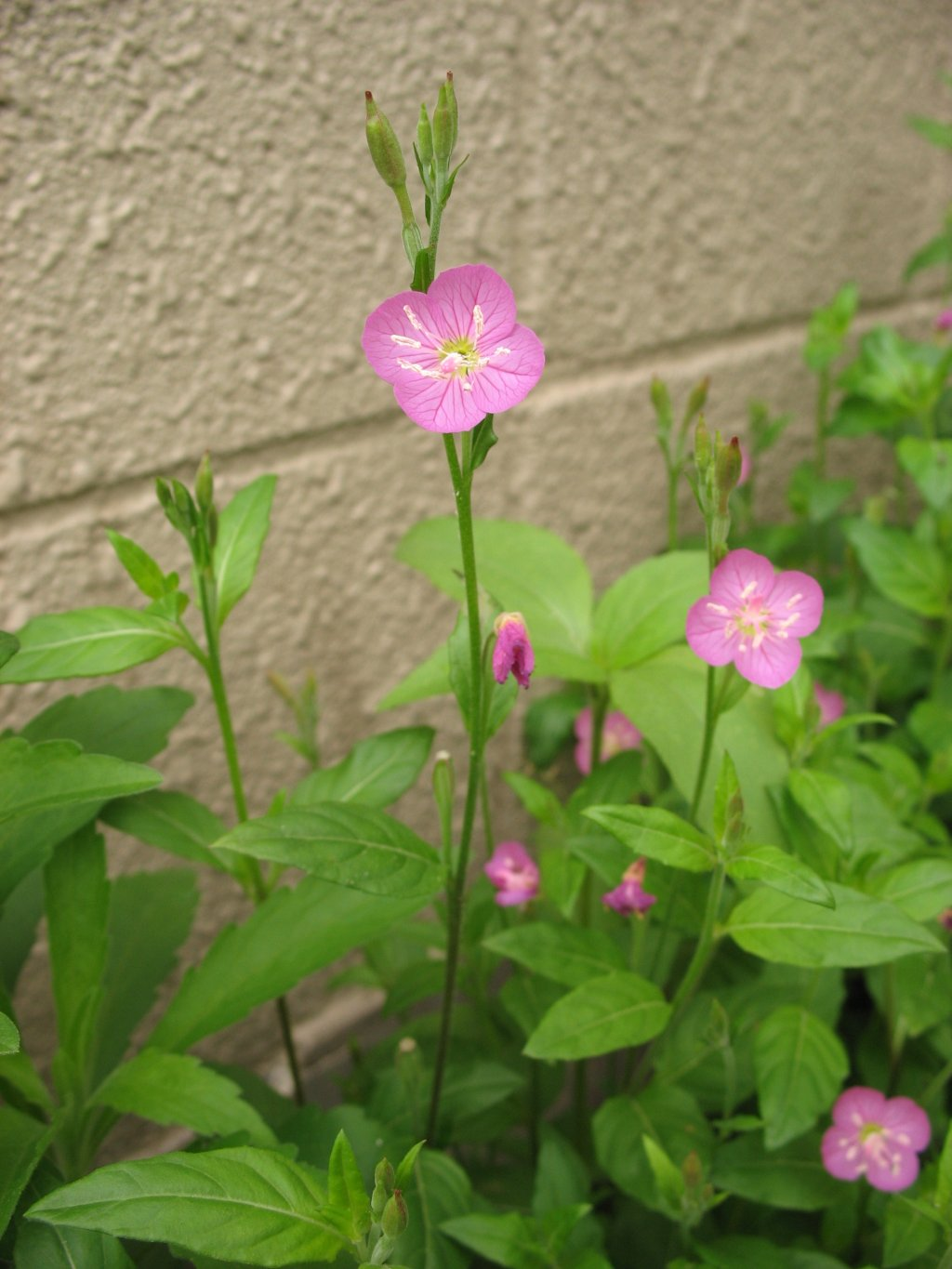

Scientific classification
- Kingdom: Plantae
- Clade: Tracheophytes
- Clade: Angiosperms
- Clade: Eudicots
- Clade: Rosids
- Order: Myrtales
- Family: Onagraceae
- Genus: Oenothera
- Species: O. rosea

Binomial name
- Oenothera rosea L'Hér. ex Aiton

= Oenothera rosea =

Species of plant

Oenothera rosea, also known as rosy evening-primrose, rose evening primrose, pink evening primrose, or Rose of Mexico, is a species of flowering plant in the family Onagraceae. It is native to the Americas but can also be found as an introduced species in several regions of the world. It can spread quickly across yards and fields, and removal takes years of sustained effort.

Oenothera rosea has flowers with less than 2.5 cm (0.98 in) diameter. The shade varies from pink to red.
