= Lake Arrowhead State Park =

State park in Texas, United States

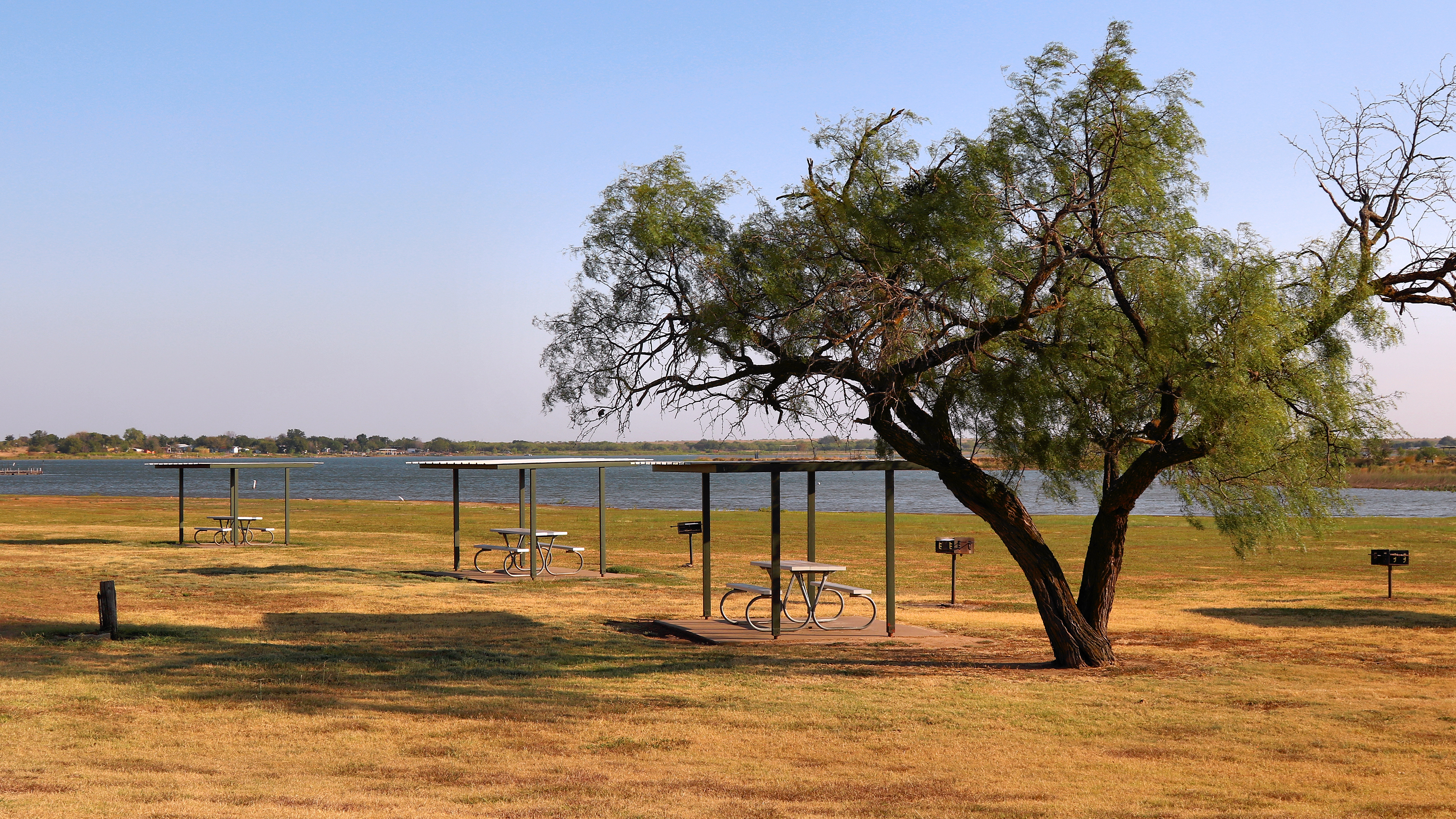
- Day use area of Lake Arrowhead State Park

- Location within Texas Location within the United States
- Location: Clay County, Texas
- Nearest city: Wichita Falls, Texas
- Coordinates: 33°45′31″N 98°23′43″W
- Area: 524 acres (212 ha)
- Established: 1970
- Visitors: 66,743 (in 2025)
- Governing body: Texas Parks and Wildlife Department
- Website: Official website

Lake Arrowhead State Park is a 524 acres (212 ha) state park located in Clay County, Texas, United States near Wichita Falls. The park opened in 1970 and is managed by the Texas Parks & Wildlife Department.

== History ==
Lake Arrowhead was built as a water source for the city of Wichita Falls and the surrounding area. The surrounding state park land was purchased from the city in 1970, and the park opened the same year.

== Nature ==
The land of Lake Arrowhead State Park was once part of a vast prairie of central North America. Agriculture changed the character of the land. Honey mesquite seeds were brought from South Texas with the cattle drives, and the mesquite savanna has taken over the grasslands of the park. The park has an ongoing prairie restoration project that includes controlled burns.

=== Animals ===
White-tailed deer, coyote, bobcat, striped skunk, Mexican long-nosed armadillo and North American beaver are seen in the park. Monarch butterflies pass through during migration in spring and fall. Bird species documented in the park include painted bunting, bald eagle, osprey, eastern bluebird, belted kingfisher, American white pelican, great egret, scissor-tailed flycatcher, great horned owl, screech owl, barn owl and barred owl.

=== Plants ===
The dominant tree in the park is honey mesquite. Other tree species include cottonwood, hackberry and wild plum. Some plants in the park are Texas bluebonnet, Indian blanket, Texas Indian paintbrush, Maximilian sunflower, Texas blazing star, pink evening primrose, snow-on-the-mountain and milkweed.

== Recreation ==
The park offers ranger-led educational programs throughout the year. The park has facilities for picnicking, fishing, swimming, boating, water skiing, nature study, hiking, wildlife observation, horseback riding, camping, and disc golf. There are tent and RV campsites, as well as a pavilion and about 5 miles (8.0 km) of hiking trails.

== See also ==
- List of Texas state parks
