= Stephen F. Austin State University =

Public university in Nacogdoches, Texas, US

- Former names: Stephen F. Austin State Teachers College (1923–1949); Stephen F. Austin State College (1949–1969)
- Motto: "Striving For Personal Excellence In Everything That We Do"
- Type: Public university
- Established: April 4, 1917; 109 years ago (chartered); September 18, 1923; 103 years ago (opened)
- Parent institution: University of Texas System
- Accreditation: SACS
- Endowment: $133.0 million (FY2024) (SFA only) $47.47 billion (FY2024) (system-wide)
- Budget: $234.0 million (FY2025)
- President: Neal Weaver
- Provost: Jordan M. Barkley
- Faculty: 769 (fall 2023)
- Administrative staff: 69 (fall 2024)
- Total staff: 2,386 (fall 2024)
- Students: 10,472 (fall 2024)
- Undergraduates: 9,048 (fall 2024)
- Postgraduates: 1,424 (fall 2024)
- Location: Nacogdoches, Texas, U.S. 31°37′09″N 94°38′54″W
- Campus: 406 acres (1.64 km^{2}); Small Town
- Newspaper: The Pine Log
- Colors: Purple and white
- Nickname: Lumberjacks and Ladyjacks
- Sporting affiliations: NCAA Division I FCS – SLC; CUSA
- Mascot: Lumberjack
- Website: sfasu.edu

Stephen F. Austin State University (Note: The statute that added Stephen F. Austin to the University of Texas System specified the university's legal name as "Stephen F. Austin State University, a member of The University of Texas System". SFA continues to use its previous name, without the added phrase, for most purposes.) (SFASU or SFA) is a public university in Nacogdoches, Texas, United States. Named after Stephen F. Austin, one of the founders of Texas, SFA was founded as a teachers college in 1923 and built on part of the homestead established by prominent Texan, Thomas Jefferson Rusk.

Stephen F. Austin State University is accredited by the Southern Association of Colleges and Schools to award bachelor's, master's, and doctoral degrees. While located in the rural East Texas college town of Nacogdoches, the majority of the university’s students come from Greater Houston, the Dallas–Fort Worth metroplex, and other cities throughout Texas. It has also served students from 46 states outside Texas and 42 countries outside the United States.

The SFA Lumberjacks are members of the Southland Conference and compete in Division I for all varsity sports. The Lumberjacks football team competes in the NCAA Division I Football Championship Subdivision. The Lumberjacks basketball team has made five appearances in the NCAA Division I Tournament, with two upset first-round wins in 2014 and 2016.

On May 11, 2023, SFA, then one of two public universities in Texas operating independent of one of the state’s seven university systems, joined the University of Texas System.

== Academics ==
Undergraduate demographics as of Fall 2023
Race and ethnicity	Total
White	57%
Hispanic	23%
Black	12%
Two or more races	4%
Unknown	2%
Asian	1%
International student	1%
Economic diversity
Low-income (Note: The percentage of students who received an income-based federal Pell grant intended for low-income students.)	41%
Affluent (Note: The percentage of students who are a part of the American middle class at the bare minimum.)	59%

Stephen F. Austin offers more than 120 areas of study, including more than 80 undergraduate majors, nearly 60 graduate degrees, and four doctoral programs. Stephen F. Austin offers classes through six colleges and one independent school.

The Arthur Temple College of Forestry and Agriculture is nationally recognized, and houses one of only two schools of forestry in the State of Texas (and the only forestry college in the timber-producing East Texas region). It was responsible for mapping and recovery of debris and remains from Space Shuttle Columbia that fell on its premises in 2003.

During the 2021-2022 academic year, there were 2,792 degrees awarded. Of those degrees, 2,230 (79%) were undergraduate, 552 were post-graduate (20%), and 10 (1%) were doctoral.

Since 2007, Stephen F. Austin has served as the headquarters of the Association for Business Communication. It is also the home of the National Center for Pharmaceutical Crops, which in 2011 discovered a potential cancer-fighting agent from the extract of giant salvinia, one of the world's most notorious invasive species.

=== Colleges and schools ===
- Nelson Rusche College of Business
  - Gerald W. Schlief School of Accountancy
- James I. Perkins College of Education
- Micky Elliott College of Fine Arts
  - School of Art
  - School of Music
  - Denard Haden School of Theatre and Dance
- Arthur Temple College of Forestry and Agriculture
- College of Liberal and Applied Arts
  - School of Social Work
- College of Sciences and Mathematics
  - Richard and Lucille DeWitt School of Nursing
- School of Honors
- The Graduate School

=== Rankings ===
Academic rankings

Regional
- U.S. News & World Report: 35 (tie)

== Campus ==
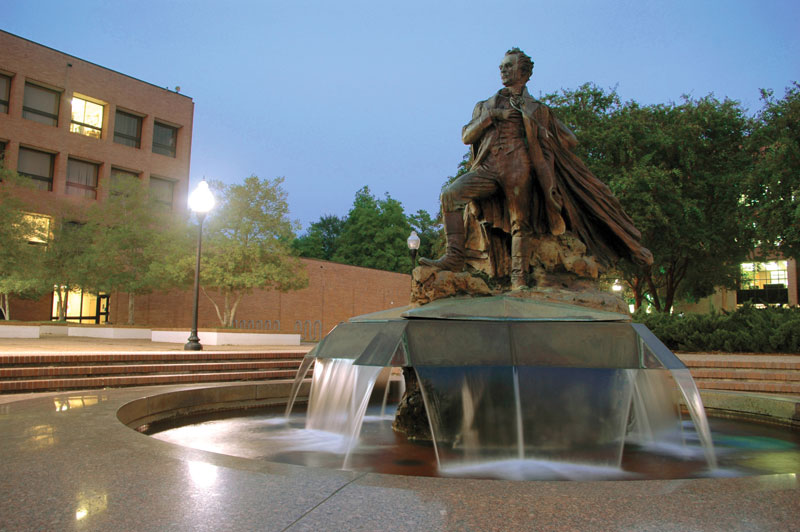
The statue of Stephen F. Austin, popularly known as "Surfin' Steve" due to its appearance of Austin riding on top of the water, is located in the middle of the campus.

In addition to the main campus which encompasses 430 acres, the university maintains a 642-acre (2.60 km^{2}) agricultural research center for beef, poultry, and swine production and an equine center; an observatory for astronomy research, a 2,650-acre experimental forest in southwestern Nacogdoches County and a 25.3-acre (102,000 m^{2}) forestry field station on the Sam Rayburn Reservoir. SFA has purple lights visible on top of the tallest buildings on campus, Steen Hall. A purple light also is illuminated in the Student Center clock tower.

The dominant tree species on campus is loblolly pine with more than 1,500 specimens counted. Other species had at most 180 individuals with water oak, crapemyrtle, American sweetgum, and shortleaf pine the most common.

Campus soils, where not altered to anthropogenic status, are brown or reddish brown fine sandy loam Alfisols except in the Lanana Creek floodplain where reddish brown loamy Inceptisols dominate.

== Athletics ==
In tribute to the forestry industry, which is a major component of the area's economy, the men's athletic teams are called Lumberjacks, and women's teams are known as Ladyjacks. Lumberjacks name was chosen in 1923, when T. E. Ferguson, a professor of English at SFA, submitted name to the students and faculty assembly. The choice was made given the university's location in the Piney Woods, where forestry and timber products are a major part of the area's economy. Most of SFA's athletic teams participate in the Western Athletic Conference (WAC), which hosts teams from the states of Texas, Arizona, California, New Mexico, Utah, and Washington. SFA joined the WAC in July 2021 after 34 years in the Southland Conference (SLC). Stephen F. Austin's colors are purple and white. In July 2024, SFA re-joined the Southland Conference

Men's NCAA sports include baseball, basketball, cross country, football, golf, indoor & outdoor track and field. Women's NCAA sports include basketball, beach volleyball, bowling, cross country, golf, indoor & outdoor track and field, soccer, softball, tennis, and (indoor) volleyball.

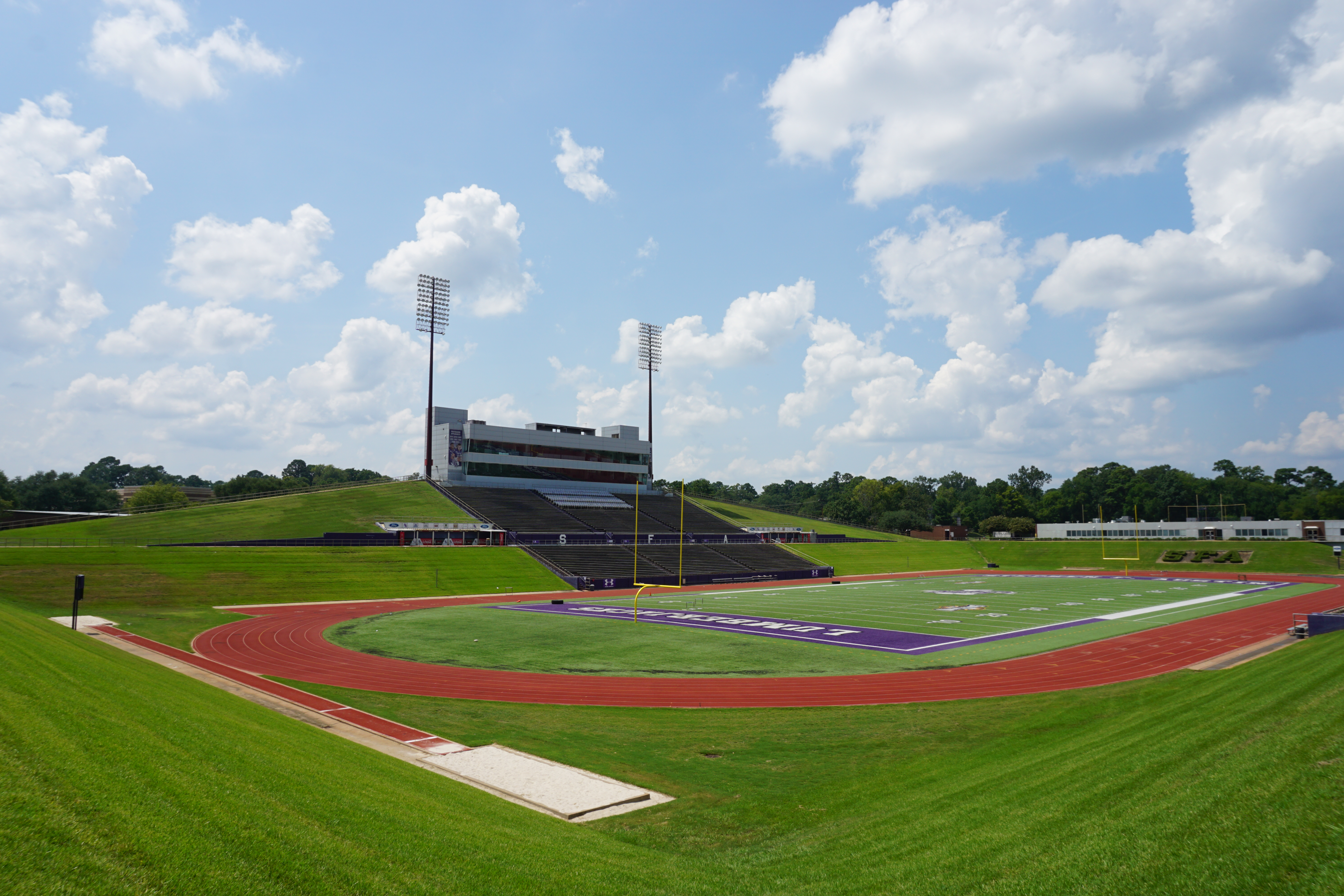
Homer Bryce Stadium

SFA's football team competes in the NCAA Division I Football Championship Subdivision (FCS) in the United Athletic Conference (UAC), formed after the 2022 season as a football-only merger of the WAC and ASUN Conference. SFA's football team earned a berth into the FCS playoffs in 2009, which was the first for the university since 1995. The team also earned a playoff berth in 2010, marking the first time in the program's history that the team had reached the playoffs in consecutive seasons. The 2010 season also marked the first time that the school had won an outright conference championship since 1989. Stephen F. Austin's only bowl appearance was the 1973 Poultry Bowl, in which the team defeated Gardner–Webb 31–10.

The men's basketball team reached its first NCAA tournament in 2009 after winning the Southland Conference regular season and tournament. They lost 59–44 to Syracuse. In their second appearance in 2014, they upset VCU in overtime, 77–75. In their third appearance in 2016, they upset 3rd seeded West Virginia 70–56. In the second round against 6th seeded Notre Dame they lost 77–76 on a buzzer beater by Notre Dame's Rex Pflueger. On November 26, 2019, in arguably the biggest upset in NCAA Division I basketball in 15 years, SFA upset #1-ranked Duke in overtime by a score of 85–83. This was the first home game against a nonconference opponent that Duke had lost in the Blue Devils' past 150 home games.

In 2020, the athletic department of Stephen F. Austin was found by the NCAA to have had several administrative errors in reporting the grades of the student athletes from 2013 to 2019, which resulted in the university having academically ineligible players to be on rosters. As a result, the SFA's football, men and women's basketball teams victories from this time span (including the 2016 men's basketball team win over WVU and the Southland Conference titles from 2014 to 2018) had to be vacated.

In July 2021, SFA joined the Western Athletic Conference. SFA houses three sports outside the WAC—football in the UAC; beach volleyball (a women-only NCAA sport) in the Sun Belt Conference; and bowling (another women-only sport) in Conference USA, which absorbed SFA's former bowling home of the Southland Bowling League after the 2022–23 season.

In July 2024, SFA left the WAC and re-joined the Southland Conference along with another Texas school, the University of Texas-Rio Grande Valley.

== Points of interest and notable campus buildings ==
- Mast Arboretum
- The Stone Fort Museum, built in 1936, is a museum and a replica of the eighteenth century house built by Antonio Gil Y'Barbo, the earliest Spanish settler of Nacogdoches.
- The Planetarium
- The Observatory
- SFA Art Galleries
  - The Teresa Jill Adams Art Gallery
  - The Ed and Gwen Cole Art Center
- Ralph W. Steen Library
- The AARC, Academic Assistance and Resource Center, is located on the first floor of the Ralph W. Steen Library, and offers free tutoring to Stephen F. Austin State University students:
- The ETRC, East Texas Research Center, is located for public use on the second floor of the Ralph W. Steen Library.
- The East Texas Historical Association is based on the Stephen F. Austin campus.

== Gallery ==
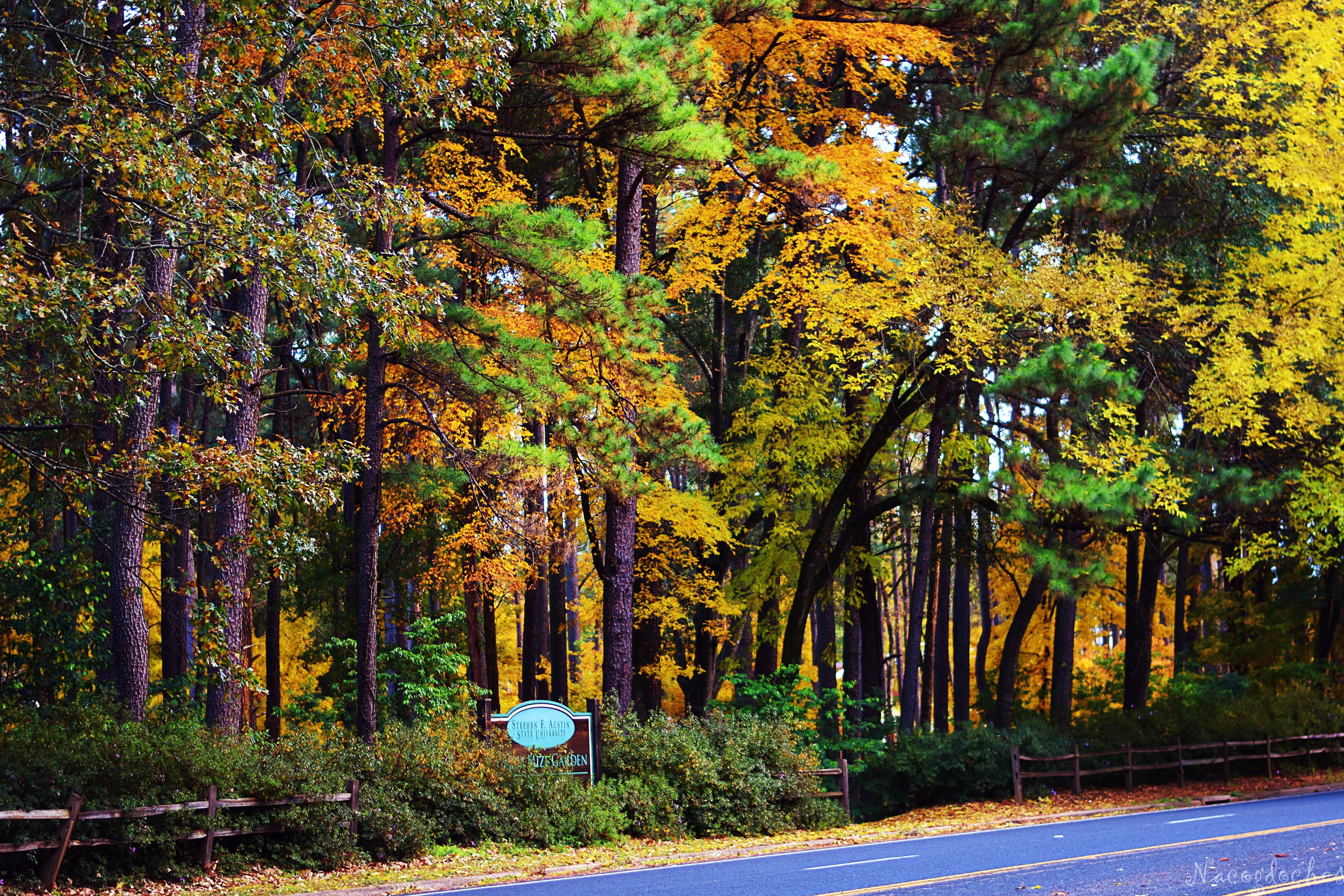
Ruby M Mize Azalea Garden

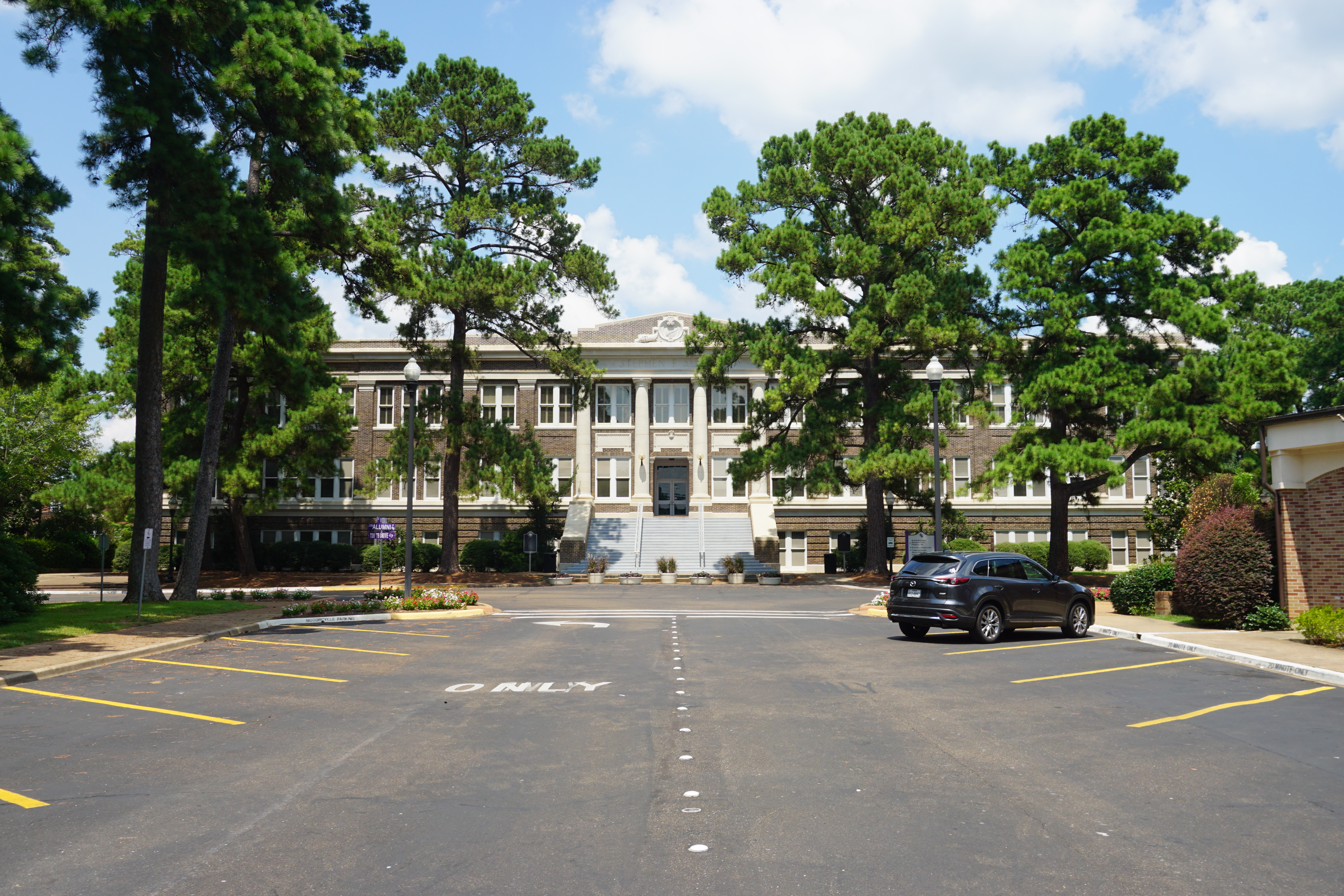
Stephen F. Austin Building

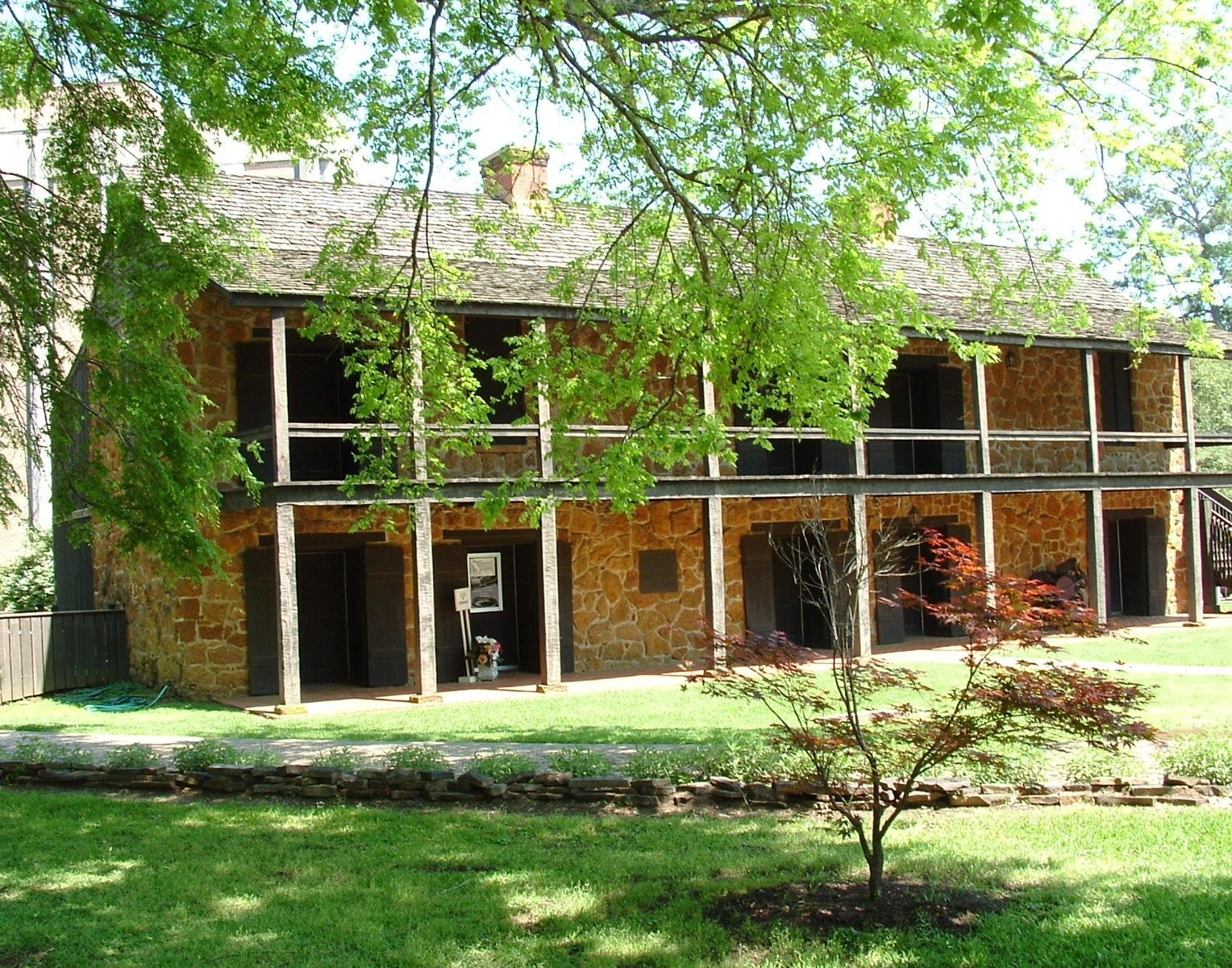
Stone Fort Museum

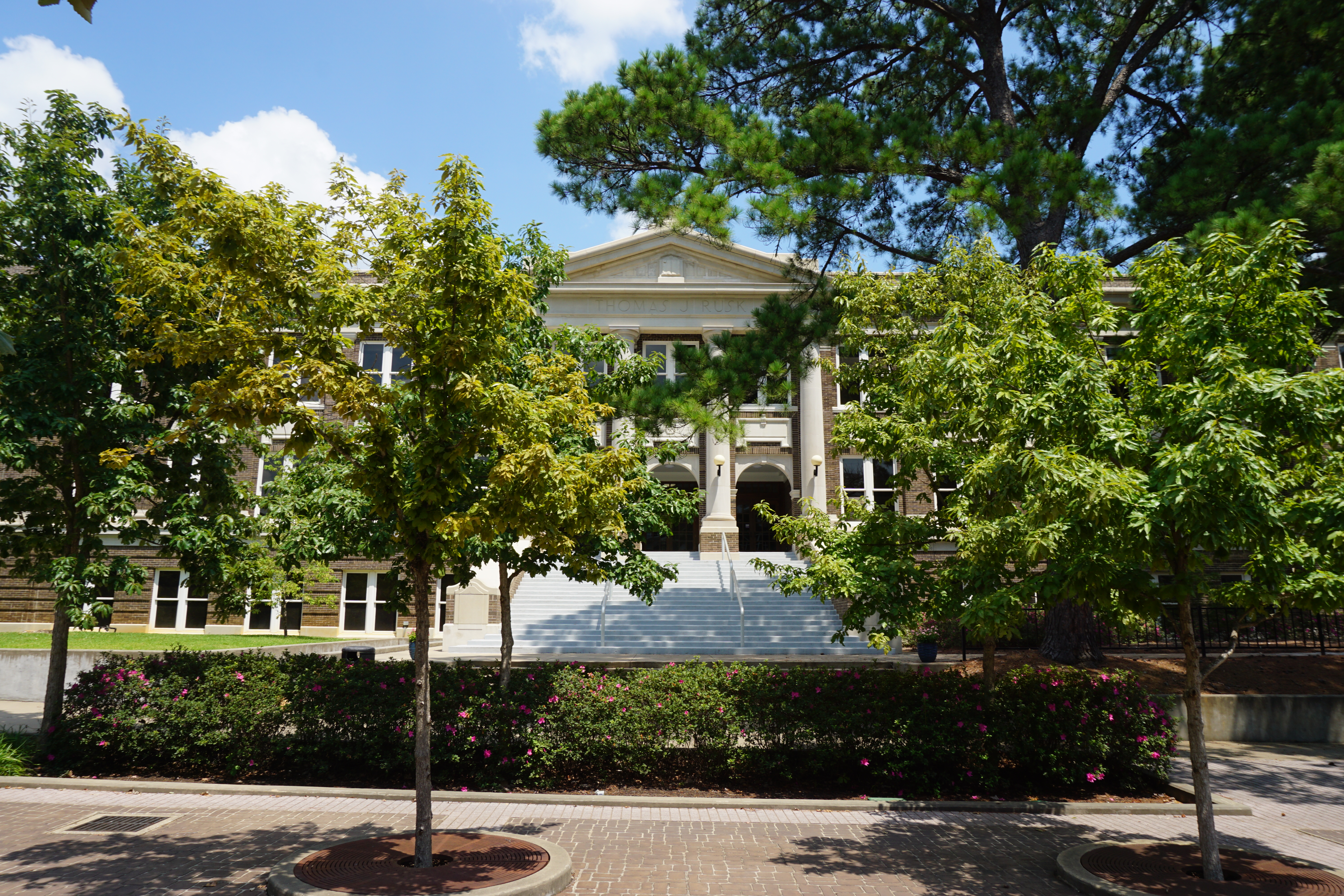
Thomas J. Rusk Building

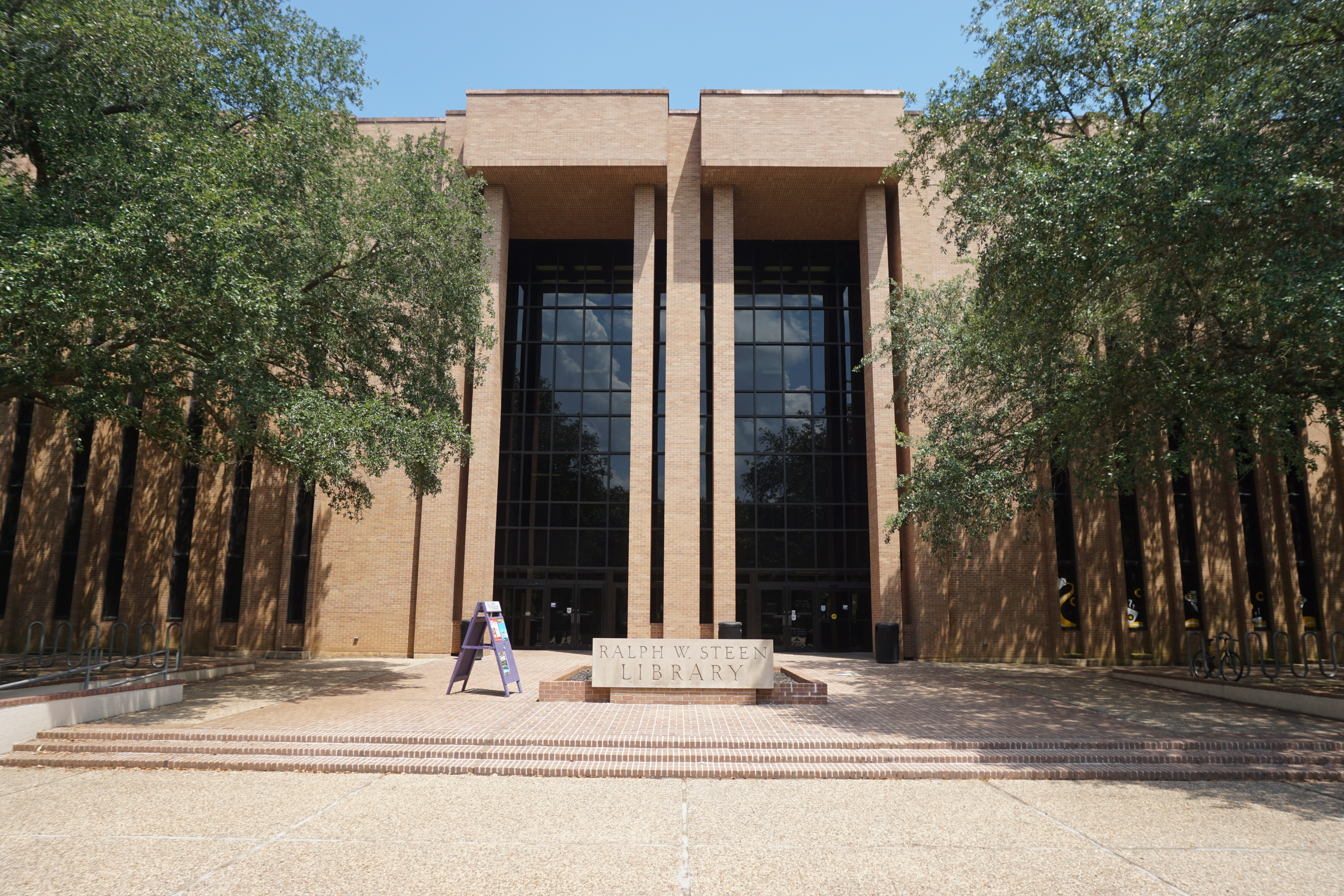
Ralph W. Steen Library

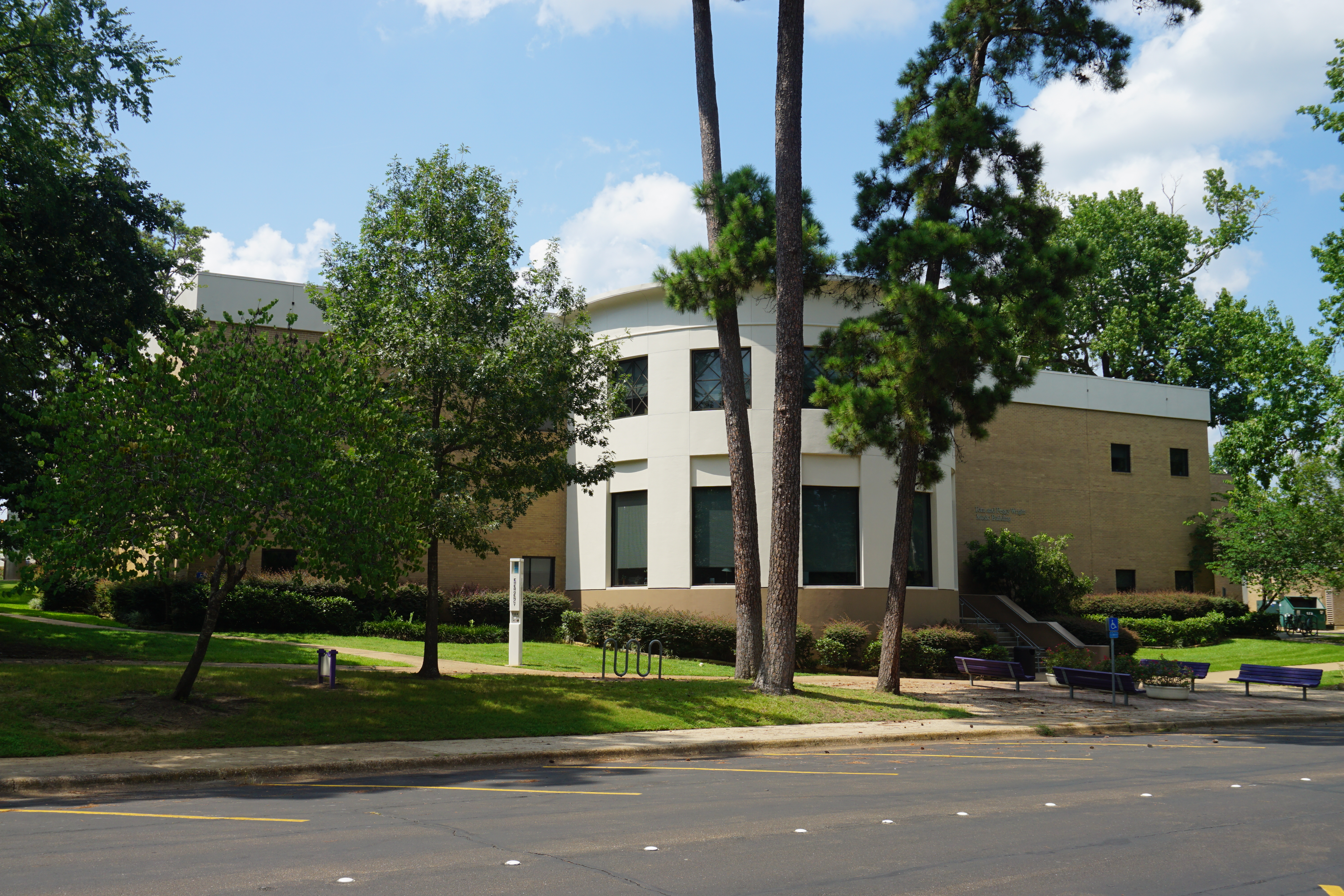
Tom and Peggy Wright Music Building

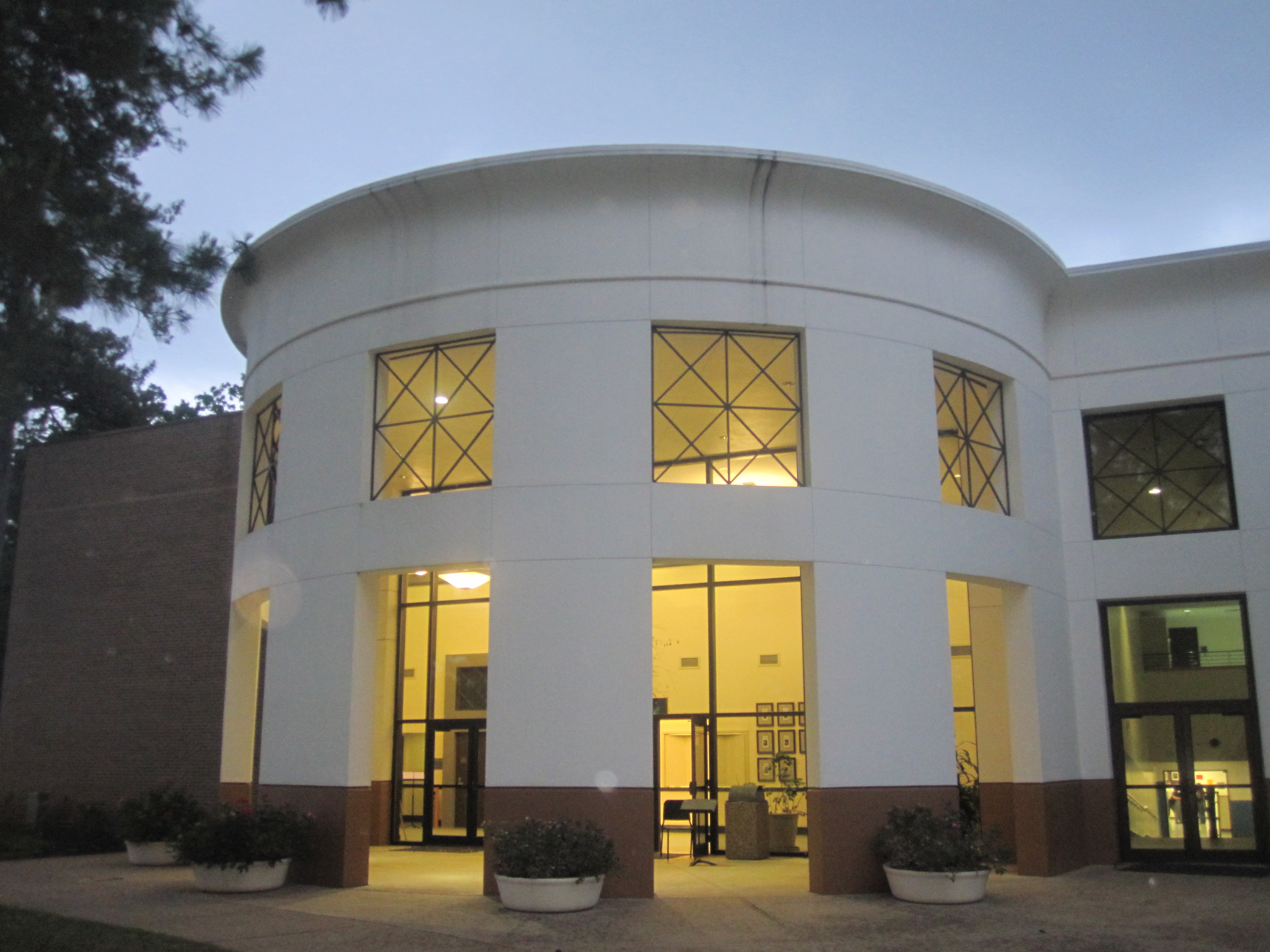
Ed & Gwen Cole Concert Hall

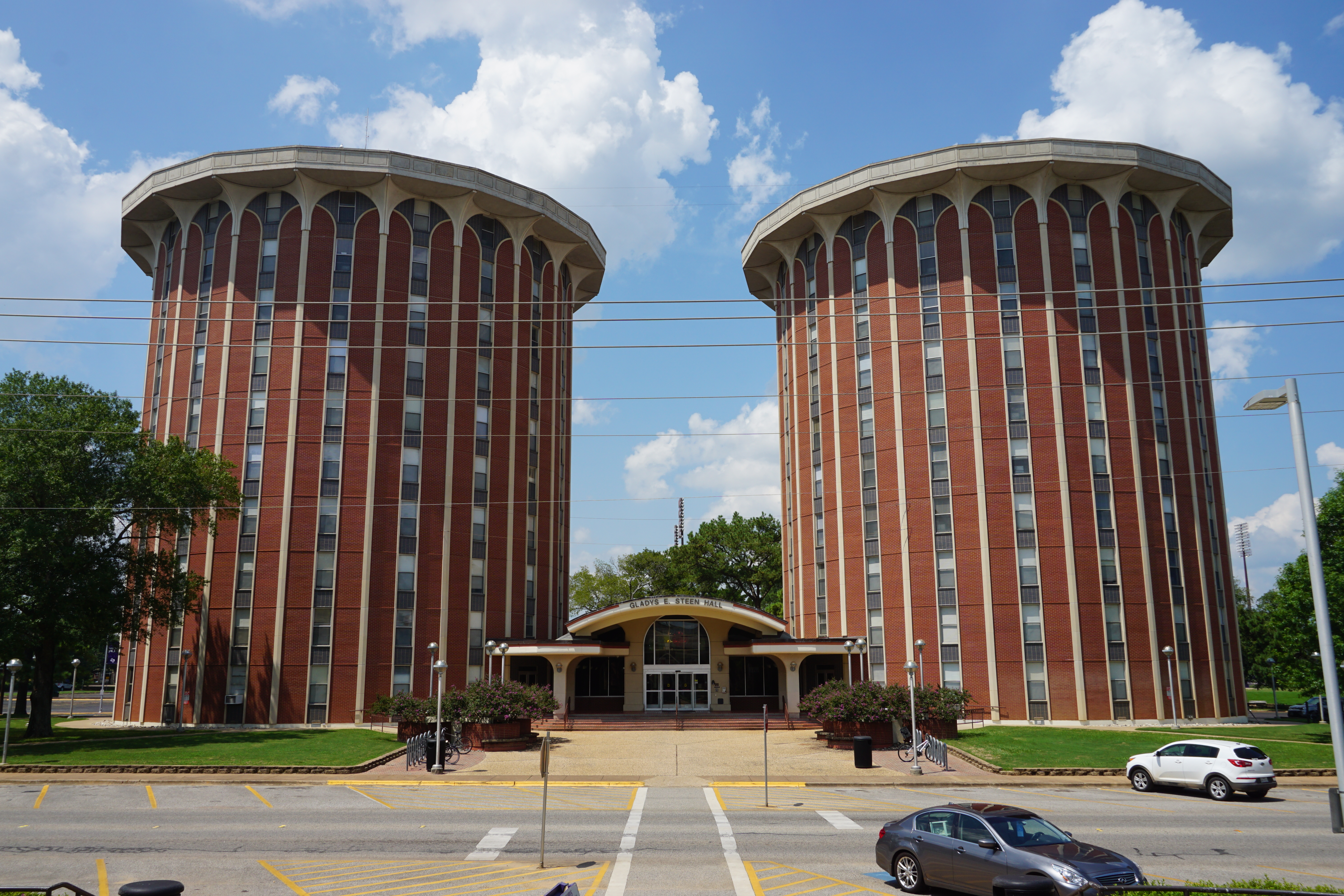
Gladys E. Steen Hall
