= Sacul =

Sacul may refer to the following:

- Sacul, El Petén, a Classic Period Maya archaeological site near Dolores in Guatemala.
- Sacul, Texas, a community in the USA.
- Sacul, a small Maya archaeological site belonging to the Postclassic Chajoma kingdom of highland Guatemala.
