= Jabara Williams =

American football player (born 1989)

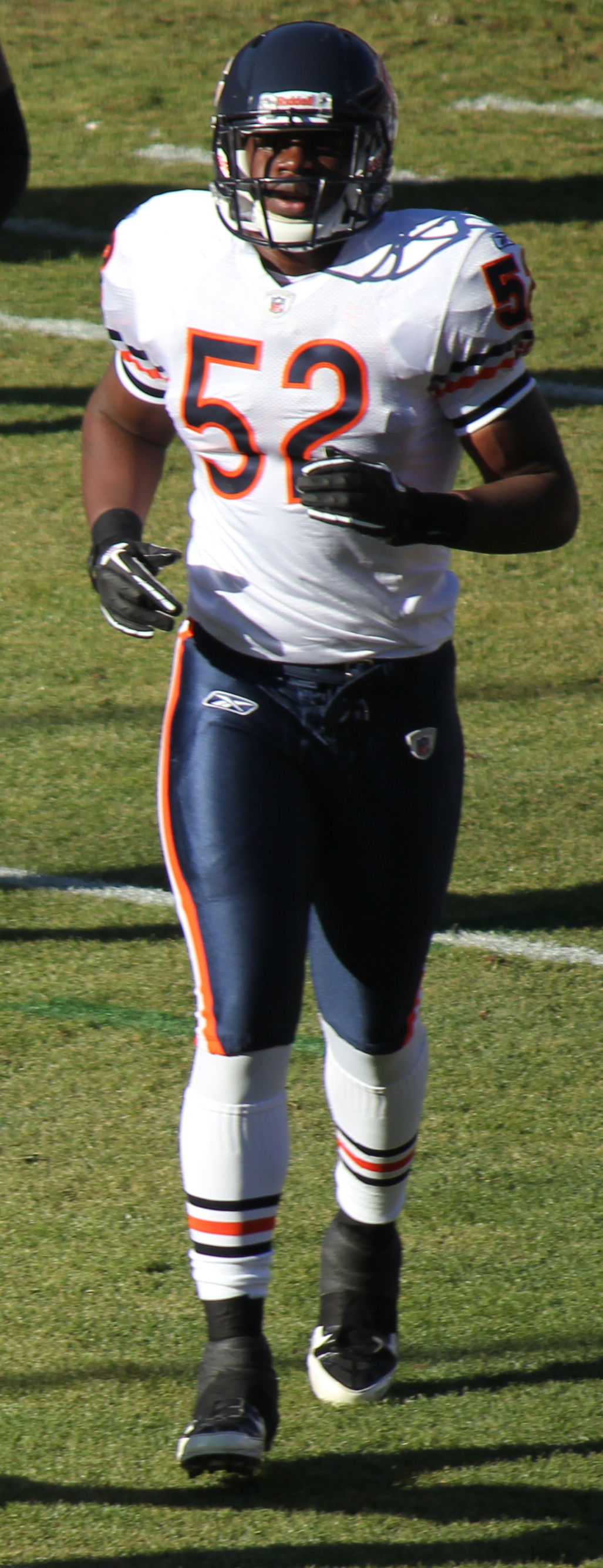
- Williams with the Chicago Bears in 2011

No. 52, 93
- Position: Linebacker

Personal information
- Born: July 6, 1989 (age 37); Nacogdoches, Texas, U.S.
- Listed height: 6 ft 2 in (1.88 m)
- Listed weight: 238 lb (108 kg)

Career information
- High school: Garrison (Garrison, Texas)
- College: Stephen F. Austin
- NFL draft: 2011: 7th round, 228th overall pick

Career history
- St. Louis Rams (2011); Chicago Bears (2011); St. Louis Rams (2012−2013)*; Dallas Cowboys (2014)*
- * Offseason or practice squad member only

Awards and highlights
- 2× First-team Little All-American (2009, 2010); 3× First-team All-Conference; 2× Southland Conference Defensive Player of the Year (2009, 2010)

Career NFL statistics
- Total tackles: 2
- Stats at Pro Football Reference

Jabara Williams (born July 6, 1989) is an American former professional football player who was a linebacker in the National Football League (NFL). He was selected by the St. Louis Rams in the seventh round of the 2011 NFL draft. He played college football for the Stephen F. Austin Lumberjacks. He played high school football at Garrison High School.

He also played for the Chicago Bears.

== College career ==
At Stephen F. Austin Williams was a two-time All-America selection, he was also a Southland Conference Defensive Player of the Year and a three-time First-team All-Southland Conference selection.

Following a freshman campaign that saw him start both as a linebacker and running back in which he made 58 tackles, he went on to lead the SLC in tackles in 2008 with 132. As a junior, in 2009, he made 113 tackles (9.5 for losses) and deflected 7 passes. As a senior in 2010, he made 108 tackles (6.5 for losses) and 5 passes defensed. He ended his college career with 411 career tackles, while leading Stephen F. Austin to back-to-back conference titles for the first time in school history.

== Professional career ==
Pre-draft measurables
Height	Weight	Arm length	Hand span	40-yard dash	10-yard split	20-yard split	20-yard shuttle	Three-cone drill	Vertical jump	Broad jump	Bench press
6 ft 1 7/8 in (1.88 m)	228 lb (103 kg)	31 1/2 in (0.80 m)	9 1/8 in (0.23 m)	4.57 s	1.48 s	2.65 s	4.30 s	7.04 s	36.5 in (0.93 m)	9 ft 10 in (3.00 m)	17 reps
All values from Pro Day

=== St. Louis Rams ===
Williams was selected by the St. Louis Rams in the seventh round of the 2011 NFL draft. He was waived on October 26, 2011.

=== Chicago Bears ===
The Chicago Bears claimed him off waivers on October 27. He was waived on August 31, 2012.

=== St. Louis Rams ===
On November 22, 2012, the St. Louis Rams signed Williams to their practice squad. On August 27, 2013, he was cut by the Rams.

=== Dallas Cowboys ===
On January 8, 2014, the Dallas Cowboys signed Jabara Williams to reserve/futures contracts. On May 12, 2014, the Dallas Cowboys released Jabara Williams.
