= Etoile, Texas =

Unincorporated community in Texas, US

Coordinates: 31°23′13″N 94°26′10″W

Etoile (/ˈɪtɔɪl/) is an unincorporated community in Nacogdoches County, Texas, United States.

== Education ==
Woden Independent School District is the area school district. Woden High School is the local high school.

The entire county is in the district for Angelina College.

The Etoile Independent School District previously served area students in grades K–8; however, in March 2022 the district announced it would be consolidating with the neighboring Woden ISD (which already takes in the high school students) with Woden being the surviving district. Etoile School closed with all operations moved to Woden.
