= Garrison High School =

Location
- 459 North US Highway 59; Garrison, Texas 75946-2503; United States; 31.828592°N 94.490775°W

Information
- School type: Public high school
- School district: Garrison Independent School District
- Principal: Stephen Autrey
- Teaching staff: 21.31 (FTE)
- Grades: 9-12
- Enrollment: 225 (2023-2024)
- Student to teacher ratio: 10.56
- Colors: Maroon and white
- Athletics conference: UIL Class AA
- Mascot: Bulldog
- Website: Garrison High School

Garrison High School is a public high school in Garrison, Texas, United States. It is part of the Garrison Independent School District in northeast Nacogdoches County.

== History ==
In the summer of 1884, the first school in the vicinity was started in a log church in Greenwood Springs, an area that was later included within Garrison town limits. It was taught by Sally Cook as "a three-months subscription-pay school". Within a year, the town of Garrison was being established, and "she had 25 - 30 pupils for a full term".

The log church burned down in 1886, and classes were held in homes. Another school, built in nearby Red Springs, became "Mineral Springs Institute" since teacher training courses were offered there during summers. From 1895 to about 1903, it was a boys' boarding school, drawing pupils from as far away as Logansport, Louisiana. There were two principals, but when one left, the reputation of the Institute went into decline.

In June 1911, the town of Garrison hired A. E. Day as the superintendent of the new Garrison High School. In August a cornerstone was laid, and the new building was occupied in December. It had a 40-acre campus, with a garden for agriculture studies, and there was a two-story brick building housing labs for physic, chemistry and biology, and also a separate building for "domestic arts". The first graduation exercises were held the following May, with its first graduate, Miss Nellie May Day.

In 1916, a fire destroyed the school building. The insurance had expired, but with the help of friendly Texas legislators, state taxes were remitted to the town "for several years to allow for rebuilding".

During Great Depression of the 1930s, students from the communities of Cedar Bluff, Pisgah, Center, Wanders, and Garrison commuted on a homemade bus to Garrison High School via Highway 35. Farmer D.L. Hancock, who was a father of pupils at the school, had converted a Chevrolet truck to a bus, with wooden benches in the truck bed seating area, open windows, and heavy curtains. This bus to Garrison High School was in service from 1934 into the early 1940s. A 1958 study said of the high school, "Records show that about 65 percent of the students are transported by bus from the rural areas surrounding the town."

The 1958 study also examined reasons that 46 students dropped out of Garrison High School from 1947 to 1957, including financial, personal, and school-related factors. The top three student suggestions for improving the school were more mathematics courses, more business courses, and more vocational courses. The author wrote, "The percentage of drop-outs from Garrison High School is not abnormally high in comparison with the percentages given in the literature reviewed." He also recommended, "That the guidance program be expanded and made more effective," and that, "A work experience program be organized."

The building constructed in 1969 has an entrance only 60 feet from Highway 59. The location of the building was deemed hazardous by school officials after an accident involving a passing 18-wheeler truck and two demolished cars in the school parking lot. The school building was the subject of a 2020 bond issue for $12 million, with $5.5 to $6.8 million dedicated to construct a building in a safer place.

Groundbreaking ceremonies were held in April 2022. Construction of new facilities, including a new gym and space for fine arts, has been slowed by supply chain problems, but is expected to be completed by May 2023.

== Academics ==
Garrison offers general education courses, as well as honors and dual credit courses, and classes in agricultural, manufacturing, welding, business and information technologies, finance, fine arts, health sciences, Spanish, and physical education.

In 2015, the school was rated "Met Standard" by the Texas Education Agency.

Garrison won the 1982 Conference 2A team state debate championship.

== Athletics ==
Garrison is classified as a 2A school by the UIL. The Garrison Bulldogs compete in these sports:

- Baseball
- Basketball
- Cross country
- Football
- Golf
- Powerlifting
- Softball
- Tennis
- Track and field

=== Football ===
The football team won the 2A/D2 state title in 2003.

== Notable alumni ==
- Domingo Bryant - Football defensive back, Houston Oilers
- Jabara Williams - Football linebacker, St. Louis Rams and Chicago Bears
