= Central Heights High School =

High school located in Nacogdoches, Texas

Location
- 10317 Hwy 259 N Nacogdoches, Texas 75965; United States; 31.7085°N 94.6824°W

Information
- Type: Public high school
- School district: Central Heights Independent School District
- Principal: John Wick
- Teaching staff: 28.96 (FTE)
- Grades: 9-12
- Enrollment: 333 (2024-2025)
- Student to teacher ratio: 11.50
- Colors: Royal blue and white
- Athletics conference: UIL Class AAA
- Mascot: Blue Devil
- Website: chhs.centralhts.org

Central Heights High School is a public high school located in Nacogdoches, Texas, United States, and classified as a 3A school by the UIL. It is part of the Central Heights Independent School District located in north central Nacogdoches County. In 2017, the school was rated "Met Standard" by the Texas Education Agency.

== Athletics ==
Central Heights compete in these sports -

- Baseball
- Boys & girls basketball
- Boys & girls cross country
- Boys & girls golf
- Softball
- Boys & girls swimming & diving
- Boys & girls tennis
- Boys & girls track & field
- Volleyball
- Boys & girls soccer

=== State titles ===
- Baseball -
  - 2004 (2A)
  - 2017 (3A)
- Girls basketball -
  - 2001 (2A)
- Girls cross country -
  - 1997 (2A)

== Notable alumni ==
- Grayson Rodriguez (2018), pitcher for the Baltimore Orioles
