= Alazan, Texas =

Unincorporated community in Texas, US

Alazan
- Unincorporated community
- Location within Texas
- Coordinates: 31.5832348°N 94.7860448°W
- Country: United States
- State: Texas
- County: Nacogdoches
- Named for: Alazan Creek
- Elevation: 360 ft (110 m)

Alazan is an unincorporated community in Nacogdoches County, Texas, United States. Situated on a junction between Farm to Market Road 225 and 2782, it was established in the 19th century, and hosted a post office from 1901 to 1911. The community is named for Alazan Creek. As of 2009, it had a population of 100.
