= Domingo Bryant =

American football player (born 1963)

No. 23, 38
- Position: Safety

Personal information
- Born: December 8, 1963 (age 62); Nacogdoches, Texas, U.S.
- Listed height: 6 ft 4 in (1.93 m)
- Listed weight: 178 lb (81 kg)

Career information
- High school: Garrison (Garrison, Texas)
- College: Texas A&M (1982—1985)
- NFL draft: 1986: 6th round, 148th overall pick

Career history
- Pittsburgh Steelers (1986)*; Houston Oilers (1987–1988); New York Jets (1988); Houston Oilers (1988); Pittsburgh Gladiators (1990)
- * Offseason or practice squad member only

Awards and highlights
- Second-team All-SWC (1982)

Career NFL statistics
- Interceptions: 7
- Fumble recoveries: 1
- Touchdowns: 1
- Stats at Pro Football Reference
- Stats at ArenaFan.com

Domingo Garcia Bryant (born December 8, 1963) is an American former professional football player who was a safety for two seasons with the Houston Oilers of the National Football League (NFL). He was selected by the Pittsburgh Steelers in the sixth round of the 1986 NFL draft after playing college football for the Texas A&M Aggies. He also played for the Pittsburgh Gladiators of the Arena Football League (AFL).

== Early life ==
Domingo Garcia Bryant was born on December 8, 1963, in Nacogdoches, Texas. He attended Garrison High School in Garrison, Texas. He worked in a flower shop the summer after high school.

== College career ==
Bryant was a four-year letterman for the Aggies of Texas A&M University from 1982 to 1985. He was the first freshman defensive back to start for the Aggies since 1972. He made two interceptions in 1982 and earned Associated Press second-team All-Southwest Conference (SWC) honors. He recorded one interception in 1983 and two interceptions for 47 yards and one touchdown in 1984. As a senior in 1985, Bryant had four interceptions for 95 yards and two touchdowns. His interception return yards were the most in the SWC that season and his two interception return touchdowns were tied for the SWC-lead.

== Professional career ==
Bryant was selected by the Pittsburgh Steelers in the sixth round, with the 148th overall pick, of the 1986 NFL draft. He officially signed with the team on July 10. He was waived by the Steelers on September 4, 1986.

Bryant signed a futures contract with the Houston Oilers on November 13, 1986. He was waived on September 1, 1987, but later re-signed on September 23, 1987, during the 1987 NFL players strike. He stayed with the team after the strike was over. Overall he played in 13 games, starting three, during the 1987 season, recording four interceptions and one fumble recovery. Bryant also appeared in two playoff games that year. He played in the first seven games of the 1988 season and made one interception before being waived on October 17, 1988.

Bryant was claimed off waivers by the New York Jets on October 18, 1988. He was waived on October 24, 1988, without appearing in a game.

Bryant re-signed with the Oilers on November 3, 1988. He played in seven more games for the Oilers in 1988, recording two more interceptions for 56 yards and a touchdown. He also appeared in two playoff games that year. He was waived by the Oilers on September 4, 1989.

Bryant played in seven games for the Pittsburgh Gladiators of the Arena Football League (AFL) in 1990, totaling 25 solo tackles, 15 assisted tackles, two forced fumbles, seven pass breakups, and one interception that he returned 23 yards for a touchdown.
