= NISD =

NISD may refer to:

- Nacogdoches Independent School District
- Navarro Independent School District
- Navasota Independent School District
- Nederland Independent School District
- Northside Independent School District
