= Looneyville =

Looneyville may refer to:

- Looneyville, New York, a hamlet in Erie County
- Looneyville, Texas, an unincorporated community in Nacogdoches County
- Looneyville, West Virginia, an unincorporated community in Roane County
