= Nacogdoches High School =

American high school in Texas

Location
- 4310 Appleby Sand Road; Nacogdoches, Texas 75965; United States; 31.64327°N 94.62196°W

Information
- School type: Public secondary school
- Established: June 1903
- School district: Nacogdoches Independent School District
- Principal: Rom Crespo
- Staff: 121.71 (FTE)
- Grades: 9-12
- Enrollment: 1,755 (2024–2025)
- Average class size: 20 - 30 students
- Student to teacher ratio: 14.42
- Colors: Gold & Black
- Mascot: Duke the Dragon
- Nickname: Nacogdoches Golden Dragons
- Rival: Lufkin High School
- Publication: The Dragon Echo
- Yearbook: Book N
- Website: Nacogdoches High School

Nacogdoches High School is located in north east Nacogdoches, Texas, in the Nacogdoches Independent School District. The school district (of which this is the sole comprehensive high school) includes almost all of the city of Nacogdoches, the communities of Appleby and Redfield, and several unincorporated areas of Nacogdoches County.

== History ==
Providing for the formal education of their youth has been important to the citizens of Nacogdoches since the first European settlers arrived in the area. Beginning during the Spanish Colonial period, the recorded history of the town is filled with references about the need for schools. In June 1903, the Nacogdoches Independent School District (ISD) and Nacogdoches High School were established; an election had been held to incorporate the school district. Prior to the election, the only education available to the children of Nacogdoches was provided by tutors, private schools, and Nacogdoches University, which was chartered by the Congress of the Republic of Texas on February 3, 1845, during the closing days of the Republic. The establishment of the university gave Nacogdoches the distinction of being "the cradle of public education in Texas".

In 1904, the buildings of Nacogdoches University and Washington Square on which they stood were deeded to the newly incorporated Nacogdoches ISD by the university trustees. Only one of these (the "Old University Building") remains, which formed the nucleus of the ISD. Classes for Nacogdoches High School were held in the university buildings, and a new building was constructed in 1904 in front of the main brick building of the university to house the high-school classes.

In the next decade, another new building, the Rusk Building or the "Old Red Building", was added to the school complex on Washington Square. These two structures housed the high-school and other classes until a new high school building, the "White Building", was constructed in 1939 as a WPA project during the New Deal era. This building was named the Charles K. Chamberlain Building by the Nacogdoches ISD Board of Trustees in 1980 in honor of Dr. C.K. Chamberlain, who was the principal of Nacogdoches High School at the time the building was first occupied. The first student to graduate from this building were the class of 1940.

During the summer of 1970, the student bodies of Nacogdoches High School and E.J. Campbell High School were merged to form a single high school for the ISD, with its main campus housed in the Chamberlain and Rusk Buildings on Washington Square. The class of 1971 was the first Nacogdoches Independent School District graduating class to include all the graduating seniors of all races represented in the district.

The Chamberlain and Rusk Buildings continued to house the high school until the fall of 1979, when another "new" high school building was completed on the southwest corner of Loop 224 and the Appleby Sand Road at 4310 Appleby Sand Road.

== Information ==
It is currently classified as a division 5A high school by the University Interscholastic League (UIL). The average class size is 20-30, with about 420 students in a grade. During the 2010-11 school year, demographics at the high school were: White 33.2%, Black 28.8%, Hispanic 36.3%, Asian/Pacific Islander 1.6%, and American Indian/Alaskan Native <1%.

== Athletics ==
NHS offers these varsity sports: Cross-country running, football, basketball, soccer, baseball, softball, power lifting, swimming, tennis, volleyball, golf, and track and field. All perform as Golden Dragons. All sports participate in the UIL 5A District 16.

== Extracurricular ==
Nacogdoches High School offers many extracurricular activities and clubs, including chapters of the National Honor Society, Key Club, and Model United Nations, the Nacogdoches Golden Dragon Band, a choir, student council, and many small-interest clubs.

== Notable alumni ==
- Jessica Allister - current head coach of women’s softball at Stanford
- Roy Blake Sr. – former Texas legislator
- Roy Blake Jr. – former Texas legislator
- Bucky Brandon – former Major League Baseball pitcher (1966-1973)
- Clint Dempsey – former professional soccer player for MLS, EPL, and the United States men's national soccer team
- Kynan Forney – former offensive lineman in the National Football League (NFL)
- Damion James – former professional basketball player in the NBA
- Delvin James – former starting pitcher in Major League Baseball for the 2002 Tampa Bay Devil Rays
- Brandon Jones - professional player in the NFL for the Denver Broncos, played in college for the University of Texas
- Nash Jones – NFL guard for the Denver Broncos
- Kasey Lansdale - an American country music singer-songwriter
- Mark Moore – former defensive back in the NFL, World League of American Football, and Canadian Football League
- Ron Raines – actor best known for the role of Alan Spaulding on the long-running soap, Guiding Light
- Greg Roberts – American football guard, 1978 Outland Trophy winner

== Notable faculty ==
- Willie Lee Dorothy Campbell Glass – home economics educator
