= Sacul, Texas =

Unincorporated community in Texas, US

Sacul is an unincorporated community in Nacogdoches County, Texas, United States. According to the Handbook of Texas, the community had an estimated population of 170 in both 1990 and 2000.

== Geography ==
Sacul is located at 31°49′30″N 94°55′08″W in northwestern Nacogdoches County. It is situated at the junction of State Highway 204 and FM 1648, approximately 21 miles (34 km) northwest of Nacogdoches and 25 miles (40 km) southeast of Jacksonville.

== History ==
The area was initially part of a dispersed settlement called Tolivar. The community of Tolivar had a post office that was located midway between the present-day towns of Cushing and Sacul. It was located in the home of B.W. Pye, who served as postmaster.

The Texas and New Orleans Railroad, which provided passenger services and freight hauling between Dallas and Beaumont, constructed a rail stop a few miles from Tolivar shortly after 1900. It was at that location that a town site was laid out on land owned by the Lucas family and W.T. Williamson. The founders originally wanted to call the new community Lucas after one of the area's principal land owners, but postal officials denied the application because there was already another town in the state with that name – Lucas in Collin County. The application was resubmitted with the name Sacul, a backwards spelling of Lucas, and was approved. Similarly, the nearby town of Reklaw was also named with a spelling reversal.

Sacul's post office was established in 1903. That same year, a Town Center – also called the "Blue Building" or "Boardwalk" by locals – was built. It housed a bank, mercantile store, and a pharmacy. In 1904, a school opened in the community. Sacul experienced rapid growth in the coming years. By 1914, around 400 people lived in the community with a number of business establishments including six general stores, three grocers, two cotton gins, a blacksmith, hardware store, and a bank. There were also two churches in Sacul, one Baptist and the other Methodist. The community continued to prosper throughout the 1920s, but the Great Depression precipitated a decline and many businesses were closed. By the mid-1930s, the population had fallen to 250 and the number of businesses dwindled to ten.

Increased mobility after World War II accelerated the community's steep decline. By the mid-1960s, Sacul had 170 residents and four businesses. During the remainder of the twentieth century, the population continued to hover around 170.

== Events ==
In the mid to late 1970s into the early 1980s antique auctions were held in the Blue Building on Sunday afternoons. The auctions drew attendees from East Texas, Houston and Dallas.

Sacul hosted the first of its annual Folk Festivals in June 1986. On the fourth Saturday of each month, a Bluegrass music festival known as the "Sacul Opry" attracts hundreds of fans to the community.

== Education ==
Public education in the community of Sacul is provided by the Cushing Independent School District. All of the district's campuses are located in the city of Cushing.

== See also ==
- List of geographic names derived from anagrams and ananyms
