= Woden, Texas =

Unincorporated community in Texas, US

Coordinates: 31°30′12″N 94°31′36″W

Woden is an unincorporated community in Nacogdoches County, Texas, United States.

== History ==
The area of Nacogdoches County around present-day Woden was first settled by immigrants from the Old South in the 1830s and called Jacobs, later King's Store. In 1886, a post office was established and the community was renamed Woden, after the Old English deity Woden. In the 1890s, Woden residents moved the community to a location closer to a nearby railroad line which had bypassed them, and named their new town Oval. In 1895, this town, at the present side of the community, was renamed Woden. The chief economic activity until the 1930s was logging, which later declined in importance. Agriculture is now responsible for notable business in the region.

Although Woden is unincorporated, it has a post office, with the ZIP code of 75978; the ZCTA for ZIP Code 75978 had a population of 137 at the 2000 census.

== Education ==
The community of Woden is served by the Woden Independent School District and home to the Woden High School Eagles.

The entire county is within the district for Stephen F. Austin.
