= Woden High School =

Woden High School (Aka Woden-Étoile Consolidated Independent School District)

Location
- 5263 FM 226; Woden, Texas 75978-0100; United States; 31.504713°N 94.528586°W

Information
- School type: Public high school
- School district: Woden Independent School District
- Principal: Jesse Stroud
- Grades: 9-12
- Enrollment: 215 (2023-2024)
- Colors: Black & Gold
- Athletics conference: UIL Class AA
- Mascot: Eli the Eagle
- Website: Woden High School

Woden High School is a public high school located in Woden, Texas (USA) and classified as a 2A school by the UIL. It is part of the Woden Independent School District located in south central Nacogdoches County. Woden High School also serves students from the neighboring Etoile Independent School District, which does not have its own high school. In 2015, the school was rated "Met Standard" by the Texas Education Agency.

== Athletics ==
The Woden Eagles compete in these sports -

- Baseball
- Basketball
- Cross Country
- Golf
- Softball
- Tennis
- Track and Field

All sports are co-educational except for softball (girls only) and baseball (boys only). Woden does not field a football team.
