= Appleby, Texas =

- City
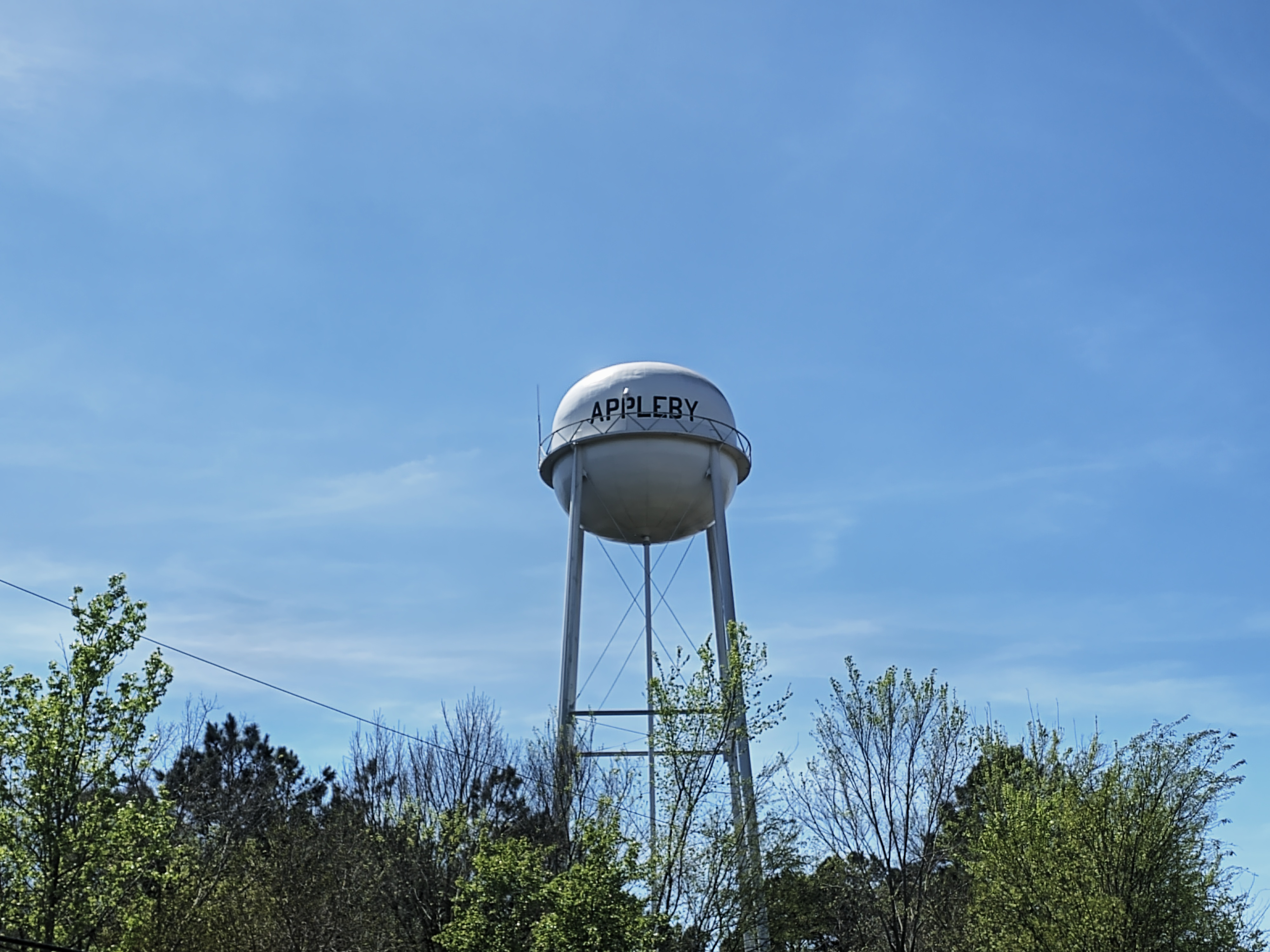
- Water tower in Appleby, TX
- Interactive map of Appleby, Texas
- Coordinates: 31°43′01″N 94°36′28″W
- Country: United States
- State: Texas
- County: Nacogdoches

Area
  - Total: 2.15 sq mi (5.58 km^{2})
  - Land: 2.15 sq mi (5.58 km^{2})
  - Water: 0 sq mi (0.00 km^{2})
- Elevation: 417 ft (127 m)

Population (2020)
  - Total: 552
  - Estimate (2024): 554
  - Density: 256/sq mi (98.9/km^{2})
- Time zone: UTC-6 (Central (CST))
  - Summer (DST): UTC-5 (CDT)
- FIPS code: 48-03564
- GNIS feature ID: 2409719
- Website: thecityofappleby.com

Appleby is a city in Nacogdoches County, Texas, United States. Its population was 552 at the 2020 census. The community was named for James Appleby, a former auditor of the Houston, East and West Texas Railway.

== History ==
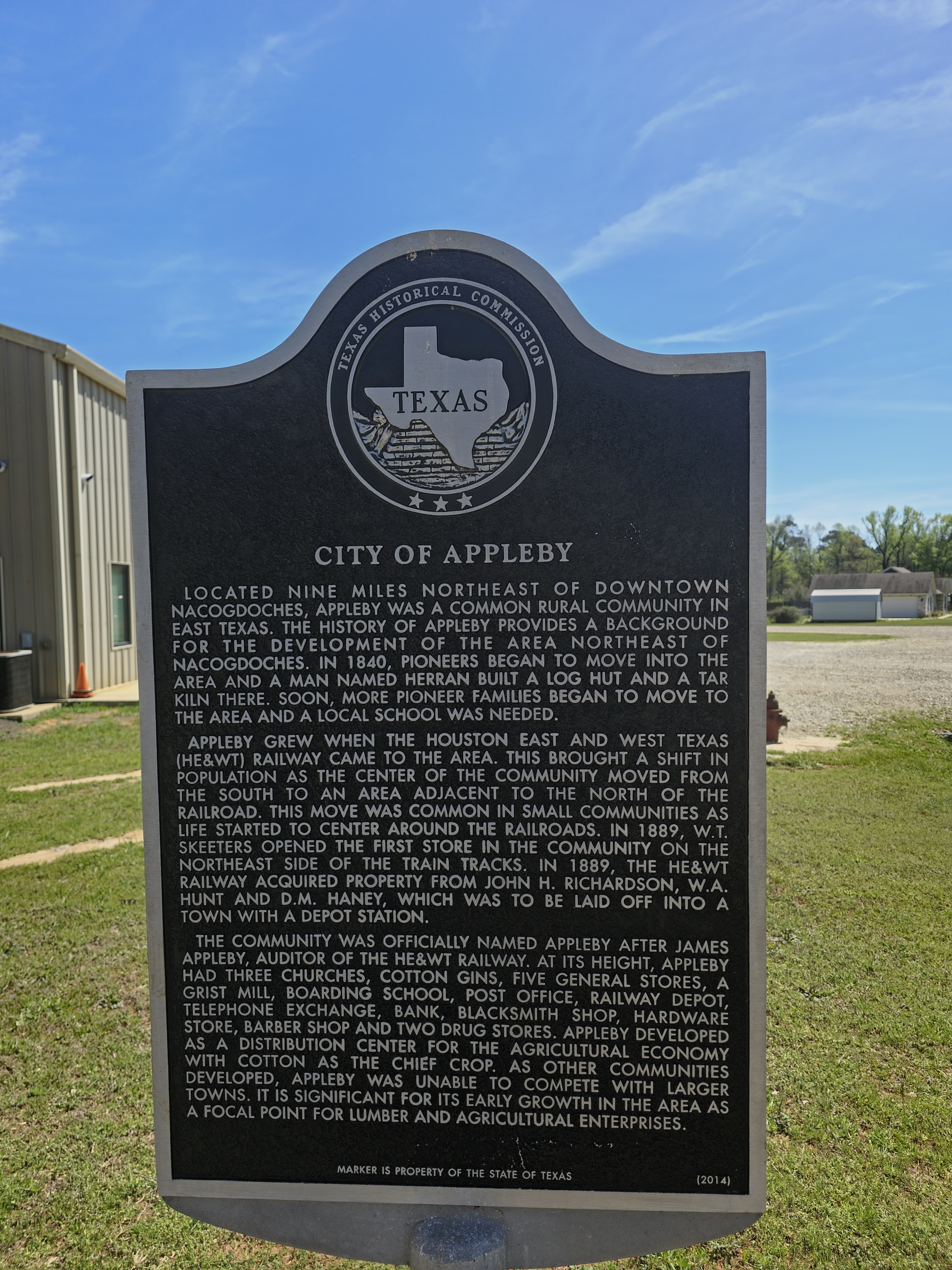
Texas Historical Commission marker in Appleby

The site of present-day Appleby was originally a Caddo village, and white settlers began arriving in the surrounding area in the 1820s. The community developed in the early 1880s after the Houston, East and West Texas Railway was built through the area and platted a town named for James Appleby, a former railway auditor. By 1885, Appleby had a reported population of 100, a general store, and two cotton gins. A post office opened in 1889, and by World War I, Appleby had grown to nearly 1,000 residents. At its peak, the town boasted four churches, two gins, four sawmills, two hotels, and several drugstores. The Appleby school, founded before 1900, became the first independent school district in Nacogdoches County. By the mid-1920s, the population had fallen to 500, and by the early 1950s, it had declined to 250. The post office was discontinued in 1958, and the last store closed by 1964.

Appleby was incorporated around 1970, even as its population continued to decline. In the early 1980s, Appleby began to gradually revive as retirees and others from nearby Nacogdoches began building residences in the area. The population grew from 280 in 1970 to 453 in 1980, and by 2024 it was estimated at 554, about half of its World War I peak.

=== Tornadoes ===
During the East Texas tornado outbreak of January 4–6, 1946, Appleby was in the path of a deadly F4 tornado that caused major damage and fatalities in the Nacogdoches–Appleby area. On July 8, 2024, Appleby was among the parts of Nacogdoches County most affected by Hurricane Beryl, with local officials reporting that numerous homes and at least one business were severely damaged. An EF1 tornado associated with the storm formed southeast of Appleby and tracked through the city, causing additional damage.

== Geography ==
According to the United States Census Bureau, the city has a total area of 2.1 square miles (5.4 km^{2}), all land. Appleby is located in northeastern Nacogdoches County, about 9 miles (14 km) northeast of Nacogdoches.

== Demographics ==
Historical population
Census	Pop.	Note	%±
1970	280		—
1980	453		61.8%
1990	449		−0.9%
2000	444		−1.1%
2010	474		6.8%
2020	552		16.5%
U.S. Decennial Census; 2020 Census

=== 2020 census ===
As of the 2020 census, Appleby had a population of 552. The median age was 40.8 years. 20.8% of residents were under the age of 18, and 22.3% of residents were 65 years of age or older. For every 100 females there were 95.1 males, and for every 100 females age 18 and over there were 91.7 males age 18 and over.

0% of residents lived in urban areas, while 100.0% lived in rural areas.

There were 212 households in Appleby, of which 39.2% had children under the age of 18 living in them. Of all households, 59.9% were married-couple households, 12.7% were households with a male householder and no spouse or partner present, and 23.6% were households with a female householder and no spouse or partner present. About 24.1% of all households were made up of individuals, and 12.3% had someone living alone who was 65 years of age or older.

There were 225 housing units, of which 5.8% were vacant. Among occupied housing units, 77.4% were owner-occupied, and 22.6% were renter-occupied. The homeowner vacancy rate was 0.6%, and the rental vacancy rate was 3.9%.

Racial composition as of the 2020 census
Race	Percent
White	79.7%
Black or African American	2.7%
American Indian and Alaska Native	0.2%
Asian	0%
Native Hawaiian and Other Pacific Islander	0%
Some other race	8.9%
Two or more races	8.5%
Hispanic or Latino (of any race)	14.3%

=== 2010 census ===
As of the 2010 census, Appleby had a population of 474. The racial and ethnic composition of the population was 92.6% white, 2.7% black or African American, 1.3% Native American, 1.1% Vietnamese, 0.2% other Asian, 1.9% reporting some other race, and 0.2% from two or more races. 5.9% of the population was Hispanic or Latino of any race.

=== 2000 census ===
As of the 2000 census, there were 444 people, 179 households, and 134 families residing in the city. The population density was 207.1 inhabitants per square mile (80.0/km^{2}). There were 196 housing units at an average density of 91.4 per square mile (35.3/km^{2}). The racial makeup of the city was 90.77% White, 6.53% African American, 0.45% Asian, 0.90% from other races, and 1.35% from two or more races. Hispanic or Latino of any race were 3.15% of the population.

There were 179 households, out of which 31.3% had children under the age of 18 living with them, 65.9% were married couples living together, 6.7% had a female householder with no husband present, and 24.6% were non-families. 20.7% of all households were made up of individuals, and 9.5% had someone living alone who was 65 years of age or older. The average household size was 2.48, and the average family size was 2.84.

In the city, the population was spread out, with 22.5% under the age of 18, 9.9% from 18 to 24, 27.7% from 25 to 44, 25.9% from 45 to 64, and 14.0% who were 65 years of age or older. The median age was 38 years. For every 100 females, there were 100.0 males. For every 100 females age 18 and over, there were 93.3 males.

The median income for a household in the city was $45,568, and the median income for a family was $53,929. Males had a median income of $36,667 versus $23,375 for females. The per capita income for the city was $26,548. About 4.9% of families and 8.1% of the population were below the poverty line, including 1.0% of those under age 18 and 5.0% of those age 65 or over.

== Education ==
The City of Appleby is served by the Nacogdoches Independent School District.

The zoned elementary schools that take portions of Appleby are Brooks-Quinn-Jones Elementary School and Raguet Elementary School. Secondary students in the district go to McMichael Middle School and Nacogdoches High School.

== Notable person ==
- Ira L. Hanna (1908–1974), 36th Mayor of Cheyenne, Wyoming
