= Redfield, Texas =

Census-designated place in Nacogdoches County, Texas, United States

- Census-designated place
- Interactive map of Redfield, Texas
- Coordinates: 31°40′52″N 94°39′46″W
- Country: United States
- State: Texas
- County: Nacogdoches

Area
  - Total: 1.7 sq mi (4.4 km^{2})
  - Land: 1.7 sq mi (4.4 km^{2})
  - Water: 0 sq mi (0.0 km^{2})
- Elevation: 489 ft (149 m)

Population (2010)
  - Total: 441
  - Density: 260/sq mi (100/km^{2})
- Time zone: UTC-6 (Central (CST))
  - Summer (DST): UTC-5 (CDT)
- Zip Code: 75965, 75964
- GNIS feature ID: 2586977

Redfield is a census-designated place (CDP) in Nacogdoches County, Texas, United States. This was a new CDP for the 2010 census.

As of the 2020 census, Redfield had a population of 392.

== Geography ==
The CDP has a total area of 1.7 square miles (4.4 km^{2}), all land.

== Demographics ==
Historical population
Census	Pop.	Note	%±
2010	441		—
2020	392		−11.1%
U.S. Decennial Census; 1850–1900 1910; 1920 1930 1940; 1950 1960 1970; 1980 1990 2000; 2010 2020

Redfield first appeared as a census designated place in the 2010 U.S. census.

Redfield CDP, Texas – Racial and ethnic composition Note: the US Census treats Hispanic/Latino as an ethnic category. This table excludes Latinos from the racial categories and assigns them to a separate category. Hispanics/Latinos may be of any race.
Race / Ethnicity (NH = Non-Hispanic)	Pop 2010	Pop 2020	% 2010	% 2020
White alone (NH)	298	259	67.57%	66.07%
Black or African American alone (NH)	53	25	12.02%	6.38%
Native American or Alaska Native alone (NH)	0	2	0.00%	0.51%
Asian alone (NH)	0	1	0.00%	0.26%
Native Hawaiian or Pacific Islander alone (NH)	0	1	0.00%	0.26%
Other race alone (NH)	0	0	0.00%	0.00%
Mixed race or Multiracial (NH)	3	18	0.68%	4.59%
Hispanic or Latino (any race)	87	86	19.73%	21.94%
Total	441	392	100.00%	100.00%

== Education ==
It is in the Nacogdoches Independent School District,

The zoned elementary school is Brooks-Quinn-Jones Elementary School. Secondary students in the district go to McMichael Middle School and Nacogdoches High School.

== See also ==
- List of census-designated places in Texas
