= Trawick, Texas =

Unincorporated community in Nacogdoches County, Texas, United States

- Unincorporated community
- Location within Texas Location within the United States
- Coordinates: 31°46′16″N 94°44′36″W
- Country: United States
- State: Texas
- County: Nacogdoches
- Elevation: 443 ft (135 m)
- Time zone: UTC-6 (Central (CST))
  - Summer (DST): UTC-5 (CDT)
- GNIS feature ID: 1380672

Trawick is an unincorporated community in Nacogdoches County, Texas, United States. It is located 13 miles (21 km) northwest of the county seat, Nacogdoches, along Texas State Highway 204. Now with a population of approximately one hundred, the number of residents peaked at 300 in 1929 when the economy - based on cotton - was thriving.

== See also ==
- List of unincorporated communities in Texas
