= Central Heights Independent School District =

School district in Texas

Location
- north central Nacogdoches County, TX ESC Region 7 USA

District information
- Type: Public
- Motto: Excellence through Education
- Grades: Pre-K through 12
- Superintendent: David Russell

Students and staff
- Athletic conference: UIL Class AAA (non-football participant)

Other information
- Mascot: blue devil
- Website: Central Heights ISD

Central Heights Independent School District is a public school district in north-central Nacogdoches County, Texas (USA).

In 2009, it was rated "recognized" by the Texas Education Agency.

== Schools ==
- Central Heights High/Junior High (Grades 6-12)
- Central Heights Elementary (Grades PK-5)

(Both located on one campus.)
