= Douglass, Texas =

Unincorporated community in Texas, US

Coordinates: 31°40′05″N 94°52′51″W

Douglass is an unincorporated community in western Nacogdoches County, Texas, United States. It is bordered on the west by the Angelina River. Approximately 500 people who live in the area. The community is named after Kelsey Douglass.

A post office of the Republic of Texas Post Office was established in 1835, and a United States Post Office was created in 1846.

The Douglass Independent School District serves area students.
