= Martinsville, Texas =

Unincorporated community in Texas, US

Coordinates: 31°38′34″N 94°24′51″W

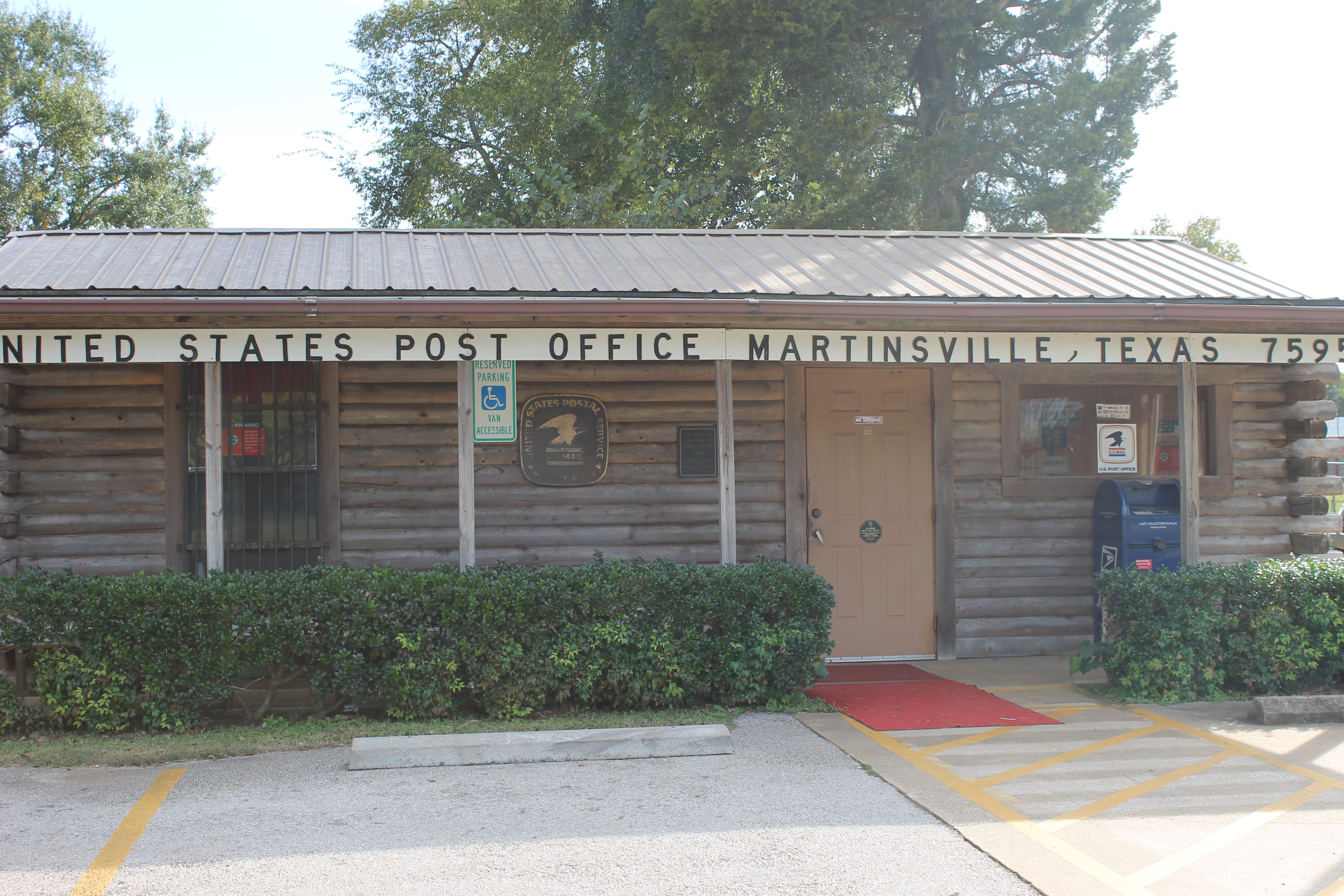
Log-styled post office building in Martinsville

Martinsville is an unincorporated community in Nacogdoches County, Texas, United States.

== Education ==
The Martinsville Independent School District serves area students.
