= Garrison Independent School District =

School district in Texas

Garrison Independent School District is a public school district based in Garrison, Texas, United States. The district is located in northeastern Nacogdoches County and extends into a southeastern Rusk County.

Garrison ISD has three campuses -

- Garrison High School (Grades 9-12)
- Garrison Middle (Grades 6-8)
- Garrison Elementary (Grades PK-5)

In 2009, the school district was rated "academically acceptable" by the Texas Education Agency.
