= Etoile Independent School District =

Former school district in Texas, United States

Spring Creek Independent School District

Location
- 16039 FM 226, Etoile, Texas, 75944 United States of America

District information
- Type: Public
- Grades: K – 8
- Closed: 2022

Etoile Independent School District was a public school district based in the community of Etoile, Texas (United States). Its territory was entirely in Nacogdoches County.

Etoile ISD had one school that serves students in grades Kindergarten through eight. Students in grades nine through twelve attended Woden High School in the Woden Independent School District.

In 2009, the school district was rated "academically acceptable" by the Texas Education Agency.

From the financial year of 2018 until 2022, the student count declined by 44%. The district also reported conflicting property value information affecting its operations, with contradictory information from the Texas State Comptroller's Office and Nacogdoches County Appraisal District. In March 2022 its student count was 97, the majority of them at the elementary level. That month Etoile announced that it would consolidate with the neighboring Woden Independent School District, with Woden being the surviving district. Woden ISD's board agreed to consolidate with Etoile, and the Texas Education Agency (TEA) stated to the Etoile ISD that the district should agree. Etoile ISD also agreed to the consolidation. The reason for the consolidation was financial issues. The consolidation was effective July 1, 2022. Etoile School closed with all operations moved to Woden.

== See also ==
- Non-high school district
