= Nacogdoches Independent School District =

School district in Texas

Nacogdoches Independent School District is a public school district based in Nacogdoches, Texas, United States.

In addition to Nacogdoches, the district serves central Nacogdoches County, including almost all of Nacogdoches, the city of Appleby, and the community of Redfield.

== Schools ==
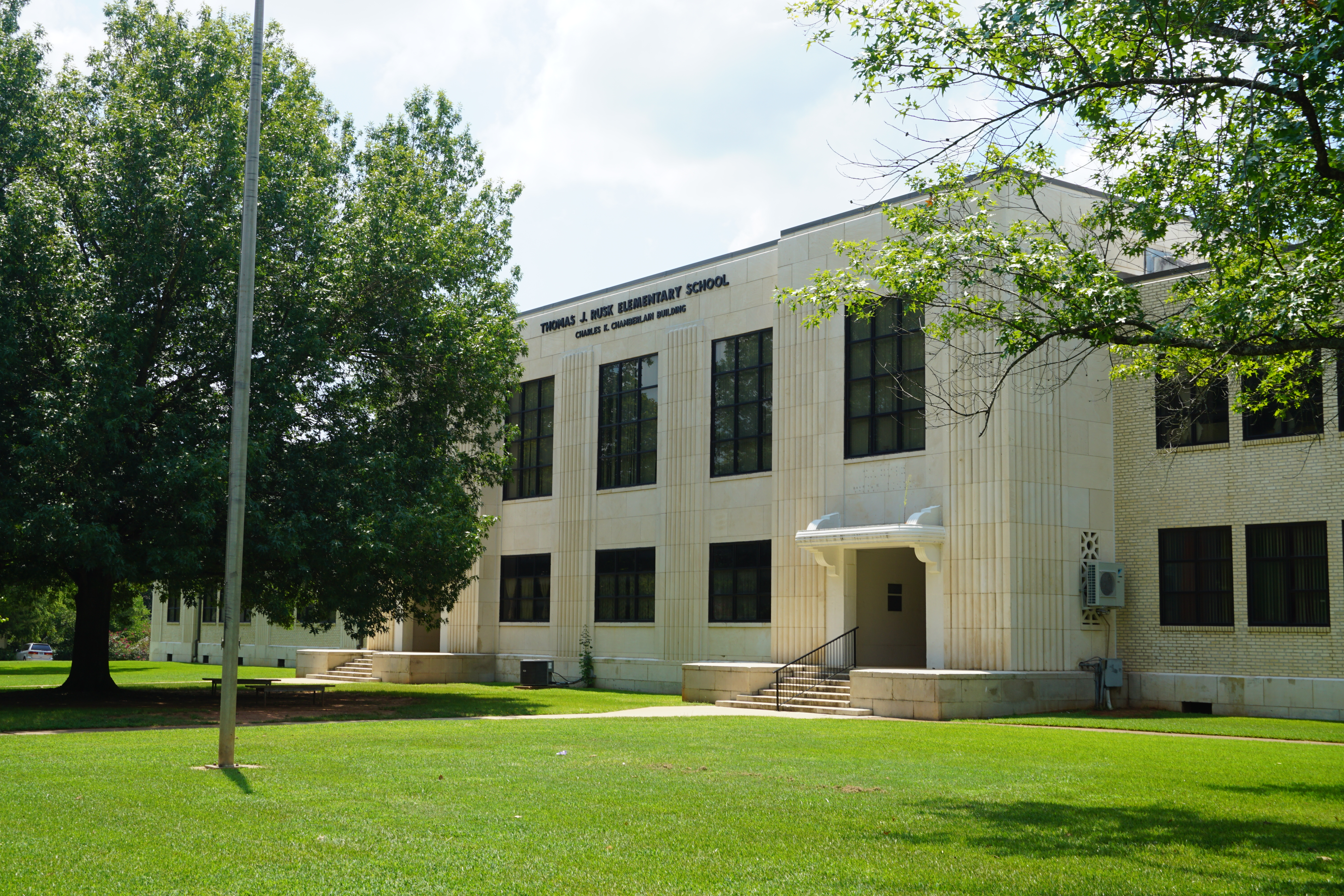
Thomas J. Rusk Elementary School

Secondary schools

- Nacogdoches High School (grades 9-12)
- McMichael Middle School (grades 6-8)

Elementary schools

- Kindergarten-grade 5
  - Brooks-Quinn-Jones Elementary
  - Raguet Elementary
  - Emeline Carpenter Elementary
  - Mike Moses Elementary School
  - Thomas J. Rusk Elementary

Prekindergarten

- Fredonia Early Childhood Center

Other

- Margie Chumbley Academy For Success (grades 7-12)
