= Looneyville, Texas =

Unincorporated community in Nacogdoches County, Texas, United States

- Unincorporated community
- Location within Texas Location within the United States
- Coordinates: 31°45′48″N 94°50′40″W
- Country: United States
- State: Texas
- County: Nacogdoches
- Elevation: 328 ft (100 m)
- Time zone: UTC-6 (Central (CST))
  - Summer (DST): UTC-5 (CDT)
- GNIS feature ID: 1378609

Looneyville is an unincorporated community in Nacogdoches County, Texas, United States.

== History ==
Looneyville was named in the 1870s for John Looney, who kept a store at the site. It has frequently been noted on lists of unusual place names.

== See also ==
- List of unincorporated communities in Texas
