= Cushing Independent School District =

School district in Texas

Cushing Independent School District is a public school district based in Cushing, Texas (USA).

The district is located in northwestern Nacogdoches County and extends into a southwestern Rusk County.

Cushing ISD has two campuses - Cushing School (Grades 7-12) and Cushing Elementary (Grades PK-6).

In 2009, the school district was rated "recognized" by the Texas Education Agency.
