= Martinsville Independent School District =

School district in Texas

Martinsville Independent School District is a public school district based in the community of Martinsville, Texas, US.

The district is located in eastern Nacogdoches County.

Martinsville ISD has one school, Martinsville School, that serves students in grades Pre-K though twelve. As of 2023 enrollment is 340 students.

In 2009, the school district was rated "academically acceptable" by the Texas Education Agency.

As of 2023 the district had four school buses. Previously the district used diesel buses, but a grant from the Environmental Protection Agency (EPA), worth $1,600,000, allowed Martinsville ISD to purchase. The program is via the Clean School Bus Program. They began use in October 2023. Principal Keith Kimbrough stated that this may allow the district to have money to hire another teacher.
