= Douglass Independent School District =

School district in Texas

Douglass Independent School District is a public school district based in the community of Douglass, Texas.

The district has one school that serves students in kindergarten through grade 12.

In 2009, the school district was rated "recognized" by the Texas Education Agency.

== Athletics ==
The Douglass Indians boys' basketball team reached the UIL 2012-2013 1A Division 2 basketball State Finals, losing to the Roxton Lions in the finals. It was the team's first appearance in the State Tournament. The Douglass Indians Boys' Baseball Team went 33–1 in the 2014 season, winning the state tournament to receive their first Baseball State Championship.

The 2014 girls' Cross Country Team won the State Runner up Title.

== Controversy ==
In July 2024, the ACLU of Texas sent Douglass Independent School District a letter, alleging that the district's 2023-2024 dress and grooming code appeared to violate the Texas CROWN Act, a state law which prohibits racial discrimination based on hair texture or styles, and asking the district to revise its policies for the 2024–2025 school year.
