= Woden Independent School District =

School district in Texas

Woden Independent School District is a public school district based in the unincorporated community of Woden, Texas (USA). A small portion of the district falls into the city of Nacogdoches. It also includes the community of Etoile.

Woden ISD has three campuses all of which are at the same location:

- Woden High School (Grades 9-12)
- Woden Junior High School (Grades 6-8)
- Woden Elementary School (Grades PK-5)

Prior to 2022, Woden High School also served students from the neighboring Etoile Independent School District. In March 2022 the two districts announced plans to consolidate, with Woden being the surviving district. The consolidation was effective July 1, 2022. Etoile School closed with all operations moved to Woden. The anticipated increase of students at the elementary level is 70-80, which would mean the elementary would have a 20% increase in the number of students.

In 2009, the school district was rated "recognized" by the Texas Education Agency.

== History ==
In 1836 the families of William Jacobs, Thomas Alders, James Jacobs, George Brown and Elijah Chisum Sr., came from Madison County, Tennessee, and settled in southeastern Nacogdoches County. In 1837 a log building in the center of the surrounding settlers' homes was built to serve as both the school and the church. This became known as Jacobs Chapel School and Jacobs Chapel Methodist Church. Miss Catherine Alders, "Aunt Katie", was the teacher. An 1854 scholastic census showed Jacobs Chapel to be the only school in the 12th district with 33 students.

In the 1860s school was taught in the home of Eli Holly Hobbs at the intersections of Woden Road and Melrose Road. In 1877 the Pine Grove School was established. This was near the present site of Fairview Methodist Church on Highway 21 east. Mrs. Melissa White, wife of Dr. Richard Penn White, was the teacher. In 1879, Mrs. White became the teacher at the Parrish School on the Old Woden Road. This school had 30 students.

By the 1890s Jacobs Chapel School was no longer in operation; the students now attended Dodd School in the home of Mrs. Anna Dodd. Also in the 1890s the Simpson Campground and Carrizo Schools were founded. Neither of them lasted long, and when they ceased to function as schools, the students attended Old Woden or the Dodd School.

In the mid-1890s the Nacogdoches-Southeastern railroad was built through Chisum land at Woden. Land on each side of the rail line was divided into town lots and a post office, originally named Oval, was established. The post office at Old Woden was closed and moved to Oval, which was then renamed Woden. Woden became a logging camp on the N&SE railroad.

An 1897 school census showed schools in the Woden area as: Carrizo School with 18 students, Dorr Creek School with 35 students, Pattonia Chapel with 22 students, and Woden School with 18 students. Dorr Creek School had been founded sometime after 1864 when J.A. Tubbe deeded 2 acres (8,100 m^{2}) of land near Saint’s Rest cemetery for a school. Dorr Creek was a common school district until 1915 when it was transferred to the Woden School District as a ward school. Pattonia School was located on the Marion Ferry Road. This school was discontinued before 1905 and may have been replaced by the Persimmon Grove School.

In 1905 a bond election was held for the construction of a two-story building to house the Woden School. Professor J.B. Oliver and Professor F.L. Smith were elected as the teachers. During the early 1900s, several small schools were established within Woden district. These were created to serve the needs of the logging fronts along the railroad as it was being extended. In 1905, records indicate that Woden School had 72 students enrolled, Dorr Creek had 71, Persimmon Grove had 18, Fellowship had 25, Prospect (which was located near the Etoile-Chireno road) had 30, Little Flock (which had been founded in 1908 when Mr. And Mrs. J.E. Stacy gave 1-acre (4,000 m^{2}) of land) had 30 and Melrose had 96. Melrose had been in existence since 1844 when land was donated.

By 1909-1910, these schools and others were either growing or beginning to fade away as parents' jobs came to an end with the logging operations or the railroad. Enrollments in 1909 and 1910 were: Woden-83, Dorr Creek-87, Persimmon Grove-28, Prospect-12, Melrose–167, Oak Ridge (which had been in existence since 1875)-125, Little Flock-62 and Hampton's Switch, one of several schools such as Donovan, Shiloh and Pirtle which were built to serve the needs of the logging and railroad families, had 25 students. It is believed that Shiloh replaced Prospect. West End School was part of Woden School until 1926 when a storm blew the building off its foundation.

From 1911 to 1917, Woden was listed as a common school and its records were kept by the county schools superintendent. After 1917, Woden became an Independent School District. The land for Woden School, 10 acres (40,000 m^{2}), was sold by Andrew Jackson Chisum to the district in 1915. The deed to this has been passed down from Davis Houston King, one of the trustees at the time, to his grandson, Ford King Jr., who was superintendent of Woden ISD from 1973 to 2002.

A two-storey red brick building was constructed in 1915. It was renovated in 1930, when a gymnasium was built and the upstairs auditorium was turned into a classroom. The building stood until 1953 when it was totally destroyed by fire. A new school was constructed on the same site.

The small schools within the district either ceased to function or were annexed by Woden ISD. For instance, Persimmon Grove was annexed in 1935. As the other schools ceased operation, their students were bussed to Woden or other schools. Most recently, in March 2022 the Etoile district announced it would be consolidated with Woden.
