= Cushing, Texas =

- City
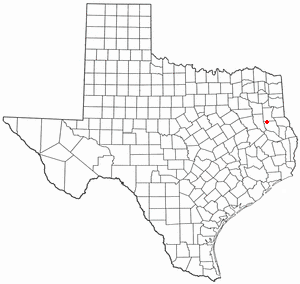
- Location of Cushing, Texas

- Coordinates: 31°48′45″N 94°50′28″W
- Country: United States
- State: Texas
- County: Nacogdoches

Area
  - Total: 1.37 sq mi (3.56 km^{2})
  - Land: 1.37 sq mi (3.55 km^{2})
  - Water: 0 sq mi (0.00 km^{2})
- Elevation: 417 ft (127 m)

Population (2020)
  - Total: 557
  - Density: 406/sq mi (157/km^{2})
- Time zone: UTC-6 (Central (CST))
  - Summer (DST): UTC-5 (CDT)
- ZIP code: 75760
- Area code: 936
- FIPS code: 48-18224
- GNIS feature ID: 2410280
- Website: cushingtx.com

Cushing is a city in Nacogdoches County, Texas, United States. The population was 557 at the 2020 census.

== Geography ==
According to the United States Census Bureau, the city has a total area of 1.3 square miles (3.4 km^{2}), all land.

=== Climate ===
The climate in this area is characterized by hot, humid summers and generally mild to cool winters. According to the Köppen Climate Classification system, Cushing has a humid subtropical climate, abbreviated "Cfa" on climate maps.

== Demographics ==
Historical population
Census	Pop.	Note	%±
1940	473		—
1950	479		1.3%
1960	388		−19.0%
1970	396		2.1%
1980	518		30.8%
1990	587		13.3%
2000	637		8.5%
2010	612		−3.9%
2020	557		−9.0%
U.S. Decennial Census; 2020 Census

=== 2020 census ===
As of the 2020 census, Cushing had a population of 557. The median age was 40.0 years. 26.0% of residents were under the age of 18 and 20.3% of residents were 65 years of age or older. For every 100 females there were 90.8 males, and for every 100 females age 18 and over there were 83.9 males age 18 and over.

0.0% of residents lived in urban areas, while 100.0% lived in rural areas.

There were 222 households in Cushing, of which 37.4% had children under the age of 18 living in them. Of all households, 47.3% were married-couple households, 14.0% were households with a male householder and no spouse or partner present, and 33.8% were households with a female householder and no spouse or partner present. About 29.3% of all households were made up of individuals and 16.7% had someone living alone who was 65 years of age or older.

There were 269 housing units, of which 17.5% were vacant. The homeowner vacancy rate was 4.1% and the rental vacancy rate was 19.5%.

Racial composition as of the 2020 census
Race	Number	Percent
White	459	82.4%
Black or African American	18	3.2%
American Indian and Alaska Native	7	1.3%
Asian	5	0.9%
Native Hawaiian and Other Pacific Islander	0	0.0%
Some other race	22	3.9%
Two or more races	46	8.3%
Hispanic or Latino (of any race)	57	10.2%

=== 2010 census ===
As of the 2010 census Cushing had a population of 612. The median age was 35. The racial makeup of the population was 92.2% white, 1.6% black or African American, 1.0% Native American, 1.3% Asian Indian, 0.5% other Asian, 0.5% other, 2.9% from two or more races and 3.9% Hispanic or Latino.

=== 2000 census ===
As of the 2000 census, there were 637 people, 226 households, and 167 families residing in the city. The population density was 503.5 inhabitants per square mile (194.4/km^{2}). There were 257 housing units at an average density of 203.1 per square mile (78.4/km^{2}). The racial makeup of the city was 95.29% White, 2.67% African American, 0.16% Native American, 0.47% Asian, 0.63% from other races, and 0.78% from two or more races. Hispanic or Latino of any race were 2.83% of the population.

There were 227 households, out of which 34.2% had children under the age of 18 living with them, 56.8% were married couples living together, 15.0% had a female householder with no husband present, and 25.7% were non-families. 24.3% of all households were made up of individuals, and 11.9% had someone living alone who was 65 years of age or older. The average household size was 2.54 and the average family size was 2.99.

In the city, the population was spread out, with 24.8% under the age of 18, 6.9% from 18 to 24, 24.0% from 25 to 44, 23.9% from 45 to 64, and 20.4% who were 65 years of age or older. The median age was 40 years. For every 100 females, there were 89.0 males. For every 100 females age 18 and over, there were 78.7 males.

The median income for a household in the city was $28,333, and the median income for a family was $31,667. Males had a median income of $25,208 versus $23,750 for females. The per capita income for the city was $15,570. About 12.7% of families and 16.6% of the population were below the poverty line, including 19.4% of those under age 18 and 7.3% of those age 65 or over.

== Education ==
The city of Cushing is served by the Cushing Independent School District.

== History ==
Cushing was started as a railroad town. The name came from the head foreman of the railroad. Cushing has burned down a total of three times in its long history. It also has a history of being struck by tornadoes, with one of the most recent being an EF2 tornado on March 21, 2022.

== Filmography ==
- The Long Summer of George Adams starring James Garner and Joan Hackett was set in Cushing, Oklahoma and filmed in Cushing, Texas (as well as in Maydelle, Texas, Rusk, Texas, and along the Texas State Railroad, Rusk), and was released for TV audiences on January 18, 1982.
