= Nacogdoches County, Texas =

County in Texas, United States

- County
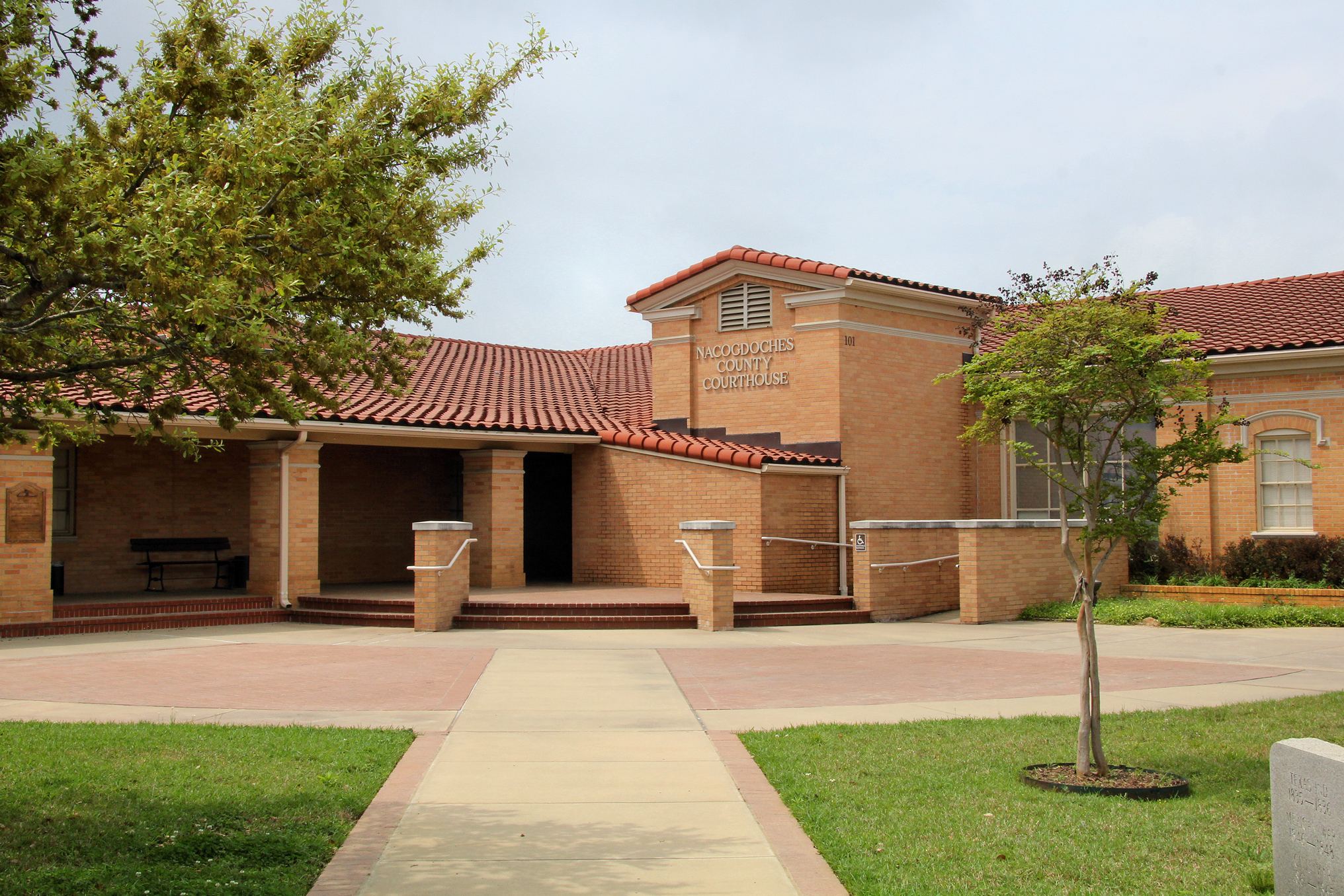
- The Nacogdoches County Courthouse

- Location within the U.S. state of Texas
- Coordinates: 31°37′N 94°37′W
- Country: United States
- State: Texas
- Founded: 1837
- Named for: Nacogdoche people
- Seat: Nacogdoches
- Largest city: Nacogdoches

Area
  - Total: 981 sq mi (2,540 km^{2})
  - Land: 947 sq mi (2,450 km^{2})
  - Water: 35 sq mi (91 km^{2}) 3.5%

Population (2020)
  - Total: 64,653
  - Estimate (2025): 66,035 ▲
  - Density: 68.3/sq mi (26.4/km^{2})
- Time zone: UTC−6 (Central)
  - Summer (DST): UTC−5 (CDT)
- Congressional district: 17th
- Website: www.nacogdochesco.gov

Nacogdoches County (/ˌnækəˈdoʊtʃɪs/ NAK-ə-DOH-chiss) is a county located in the U.S. state of Texas. As of the 2020 census, its population was 64,653. Its county seat is Nacogdoches.

The Nacogdoches, Texas micropolitan statistical area includes all of Nacogdoches County.

Nacogdoches hosts the Blueberry Festival in June. The county is the top blueberry producer in Texas and is headquarters for the Texas Blueberry Marketing Association. It tagged itself as the "Capital of the Texas Forest Country".

== History ==
The county was created in 1826 as a municipality of Mexico and organized as a county in 1837.

== Geography ==
According to the U.S. Census Bureau, the county has a total area of 981 square miles (2,540 km^{2}), of which 35 square miles (91 km^{2}) (3.5%) are covered by water.

=== Adjacent counties ===
- Rusk County (north)
- Shelby County (northeast)
- San Augustine County (southeast)
- Angelina County (south)
- Cherokee County (west)

=== National protected area ===
- Angelina National Forest (part)

== Demographics ==
Historical population
Census	Pop.	Note	%±
1850	5,193		—
1860	8,292		59.7%
1870	9,614		15.9%
1880	11,590		20.6%
1890	15,984		37.9%
1900	24,663		54.3%
1910	27,406		11.1%
1920	28,457		3.8%
1930	30,290		6.4%
1940	35,392		16.8%
1950	30,326		−14.3%
1960	28,046		−7.5%
1970	36,362		29.7%
1980	46,786		28.7%
1990	54,753		17.0%
2000	59,203		8.1%
2010	64,524		9.0%
2020	64,653		0.2%
2025 (est.)	66,035	▲	2.1%
U.S. Decennial Census; 1850–2010 2010 2020

=== Racial and ethnic composition ===
Nacogdoches County, Texas – Racial and ethnic composition Note: the US Census treats Hispanic/Latino as an ethnic category. This table excludes Latinos from the racial categories and assigns them to a separate category. Hispanics/Latinos may be of any race.
Race / Ethnicity (NH = Non-Hispanic)	Pop 1980	Pop 1990	Pop 2000	Pop 2010	Pop 2020	% 1980	% 1990	% 2000	% 2010	% 2020
White alone (NH)	37,218	42,575	41,620	39,699	37,158	79.55%	77.76%	70.30%	61.53%	57.47%
Black or African American alone (NH)	7,920	8,948	9,815	11,573	10,567	16.93%	16.34%	16.58%	17.94%	16.34%
Native American or Alaska Native alone (NH)	85	125	169	230	191	0.18%	0.23%	0.29%	0.36%	0.30%
Asian alone (NH)	185	283	398	775	760	0.40%	0.52%	0.67%	1.20%	1.18%
Native Hawaiian or Pacific Islander alone (NH)	x	x	23	15	10	x	x	0.04%	0.02%	0.02%
Other race alone (NH)	58	34	25	54	190	0.12%	0.06%	0.04%	0.08%	0.29%
Mixed race or Multiracial (NH)	x	x	493	822	2,180	x	x	0.83%	1.27%	3.37%
Hispanic or Latino (any race)	1,320	2,788	6,660	11,356	13,597	2.82%	5.09%	11.25%	17.60%	21.03%
Total	46,786	54,753	59,203	64,524	64,653	100.00%	100.00%	100.00%	100.00%	100.00%

=== 2020 census ===
As of the 2020 census, the county had a population of 64,653. The median age was 33.4 years; 22.7% of the residents were under 18 and 15.9% were 65 or older. For every 100 females, there were 91.2 males, and for every 100 females 18 and over, there were 87.7 males 18 and over.

The racial makeup of the county was 62.2% White, 16.6% Black or African American, 0.6% American Indian and Alaska Native, 1.2% Asian, <0.1% Native Hawaiian and Pacific Islander, 10.5% from some other race, and 8.9% from two or more races. Hispanic or Latino residents of any race comprised 21.0% of the population.

About 52.2% of the residents lived in urban areas, while 47.8% lived in rural areas.

Of the 24,713 households in the county, 30.0% had children under 18 living in them, 43.2% were married-couple households, 20.2% were households with a male householder and no spouse or partner present, and 31.2% were households with a female householder and no spouse or partner present. About 30.6% of all households were made up of individuals, and 11.8% had someone living alone who was 65 or older.

The county had 28,877 housing units, of which 14.4% were vacant. Among occupied housing units, 58.6% were owner-occupied and 41.4% were renter-occupied. The homeowner vacancy rate was 1.4% and the rental vacancy rate was 13.6%.

=== 2000 census ===
As of the census of 2000, 59,203 people, 22,006 households, and 14,039 families resided in the county. The population density was 62 people per square mile (24 people/km^{2}). The 25,051 housing units had an average density of 26 units per square mile (10 units/km^{2}). The racial makeup of the county was 75.00% White, 16.74% African American, 0.39% Native American, 0.70% Asian, 0.07% Pacific Islander, 5.70% from other races, and 1.41% from two or more races. About 11.25% of the population were Hispanics or Latinos of any race.

Of the 22,006 households, 30.5% had children under 18 living with them, 48.3% were married couples living together, 11.8% had a female householder with no husband present, and 36.2% were not families. About 27.6% of all households were made up of individuals, and 9.3% had someone living alone who was 65 or older. The average household size was 2.49, and the average family size was 3.08.

In the county, the age distribution was 24.0% under the age of 18, 20.0% from 18 to 24, 24.7% from 25 to 44, 19.2% from 45 to 64, and 12.1% who were 65 or older. The median age was 30 years. For every 100 females, there were 93.00 males. For every 100 females 18 and over, there were 89.00 males.

The median income for a household in the county was $28,301, and for a family was $38,347. Males had a median income of $29,502 versus $21,422 for females. The per capita income for the county was $15,437. About 15.5% of families and 23.3% of the population were below the poverty line, including 27.1% of those under 18 and 13.9% of those 65 or over.

== Transportation ==
=== Bus ===
Greyhound Lines operates the Nacogdoches Station at the Kerrville Bus Company station in Nacogdoches.

=== Major highways ===
- U.S. Highway 59
  - Interstate 69 is currently under construction and will follow the current route of U.S. 59 in most places.
- U.S. Highway 259
- State Highway 7
- State Highway 21
- State Highway 103
- State Highway 204
- Loop 34
- Loop 224
- Spur 300

== Communities ==
=== Cities ===
- Appleby
- Chireno
- Cushing
- Garrison
- Nacogdoches (county seat and largest municipality)

=== Census-designated place ===
- Redfield

=== Unincorporated communities ===
- Douglass
- Etoile
- Harmony
- Looneyville
- Martinsville
- Sacul
- Trawick
- Woden

== Education ==
School districts:

- Central Heights Independent School District
- Chireno Independent School District
- Cushing Independent School District
- Douglass Independent School District
- Garrison Independent School District
- Martinsville Independent School District
- Nacogdoches Independent School District
- Woden Independent School District

The county is in the district for Angelina College.

Etoile Independent School District, which formerly served parts of the county, merged into Woden ISD in 2022.

== Notable residents ==
- Clint Dempsey, professional soccer player
- John H. Hannah Jr. - U.S. District Court judge
- Ron Raines, actor

== Politics ==
United States presidential election results for Nacogdoches County, Texas
Year	Republican		Democratic		Third party(ies)	
Year	No.	%	No.	%	No.	%
1912	94	4.48%	1,614	77.00%	388	18.51%
1916	92	4.60%	1,766	88.21%	144	7.19%
1920	238	8.73%	1,794	65.79%	695	25.49%
1924	204	5.56%	3,418	93.16%	47	1.28%
1928	822	30.41%	1,879	69.52%	2	0.07%
1932	117	3.14%	3,603	96.70%	6	0.16%
1936	209	4.87%	4,075	95.01%	5	0.12%
1940	440	8.10%	4,988	91.83%	4	0.07%
1944	319	7.63%	3,226	77.14%	637	15.23%
1948	833	18.37%	3,195	70.47%	506	11.16%
1952	2,891	44.84%	3,556	55.16%	0	0.00%
1956	3,285	53.28%	2,855	46.31%	25	0.41%
1960	3,042	45.19%	3,522	52.32%	168	2.50%
1964	2,976	39.58%	4,524	60.17%	19	0.25%
1968	3,235	32.74%	3,449	34.91%	3,196	32.35%
1972	8,757	70.41%	3,656	29.40%	24	0.19%
1976	7,315	51.73%	6,697	47.36%	129	0.91%
1980	8,626	56.94%	5,981	39.48%	543	3.58%
1984	13,063	69.44%	5,694	30.27%	55	0.29%
1988	11,767	62.32%	6,886	36.47%	230	1.22%
1992	9,864	45.58%	6,937	32.05%	4,842	22.37%
1996	10,361	53.25%	7,641	39.27%	1,456	7.48%
2000	13,145	66.39%	6,204	31.33%	450	2.27%
2004	14,160	65.96%	7,152	33.32%	154	0.72%
2008	14,828	63.39%	8,393	35.88%	170	0.73%
2012	13,925	67.42%	6,465	31.30%	263	1.27%
2016	14,771	65.29%	6,846	30.26%	1,005	4.44%
2020	17,378	64.88%	9,000	33.60%	407	1.52%
2024	17,575	68.96%	7,690	30.17%	221	0.87%

United States Senate election results for Nacogdoches County, Texas1
Year	Republican		Democratic		Third party(ies)	
Year	No.	%	No.	%	No.	%
2024	17,072	67.01%	7,927	31.11%	478	1.88%

United States Senate election results for Nacogdoches County, Texas2
Year	Republican		Democratic		Third party(ies)	
Year	No.	%	No.	%	No.	%
2020	17,370	65.55%	8,487	32.03%	642	2.42%

Texas Gubernatorial election results for Nacogdoches County
Year	Republican		Democratic		Third party(ies)	
Year	No.	%	No.	%	No.	%
2022	13,248	69.91%	5,480	28.92%	222	1.17%

Nacogdoches is a Republican stronghold, voting for the Republican candidate in every presidential election since 1972.

== See also ==
- Millard's Crossing Historic Village
- Old Stone Fort Museum
- Sterne-Hoya House Museum and Library
- List of museums in East Texas
- National Register of Historic Places listings in Nacogdoches County, Texas
- Recorded Texas Historic Landmarks in Nacogdoches County
