= Garrison, Texas =

- City
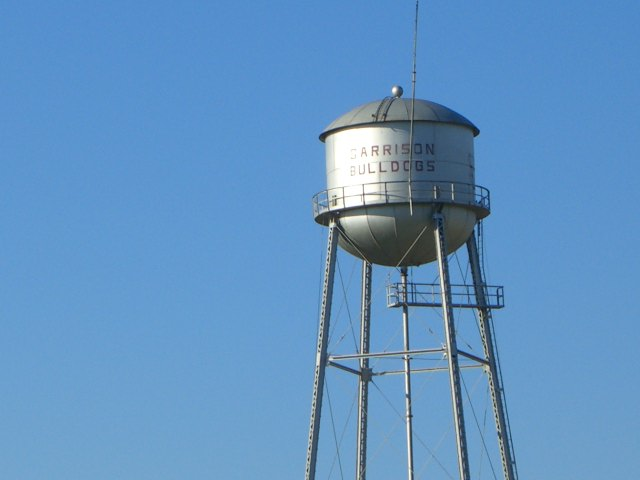
- Water tower in Garrison

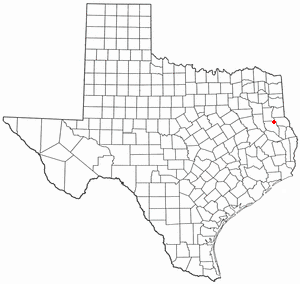
- Location of Garrison, Texas

- Coordinates: 31°49′40″N 94°29′52″W
- Country: United States
- State: Texas
- County: Nacogdoches

Area
  - Total: 1.17 sq mi (3.04 km^{2})
  - Land: 1.17 sq mi (3.04 km^{2})
  - Water: 0 sq mi (0.00 km^{2})
- Elevation: 397 ft (121 m)

Population (2020)
  - Total: 789
  - Density: 743.7/sq mi (287.14/km^{2})
- Time zone: UTC-6 (Central (CST))
  - Summer (DST): UTC-5 (CDT)
- ZIP code: 75946
- Area code: 936
- FIPS code: 48-29060
- GNIS feature ID: 2410574
- Website: garrisontx.us

Garrison is a small town in Nacogdoches County, Texas, United States. The population was 789 at the 2020 census.

== History ==
Garrison may be named for an early settler, Captain Zadock Bonner "Zed" Garrison (April 20, 1829 – January 9, 1909). Captain Garrison served as a First Lieutenant in the First Regiment, Texas Mounted Volunteers during the Civil War.

== Geography ==
According to the United States Census Bureau, the city has a total area of 1.2 square miles (3.1 km^{2}), all land.

== Demographics ==
Historical population
Census	Pop.	Note	%±
1890	252		—
1900	530		110.3%
1910	627		18.3%
1920	603		−3.8%
1930	527		−12.6%
1940	770		46.1%
1950	699		−9.2%
1960	951		36.1%
1970	1,082		13.8%
1980	1,059		−2.1%
1990	883		−16.6%
2000	844		−4.4%
2010	895		6.0%
2020	789		−11.8%
U.S. Decennial Census

=== 2020 census ===
As of the 2020 census, Garrison had a population of 789 and a median age of 41.2 years. 25.3% of residents were under the age of 18 and 22.7% of residents were 65 years of age or older. For every 100 females there were 94.3 males, and for every 100 females age 18 and over there were 81.8 males age 18 and over.

0.0% of residents lived in urban areas, while 100.0% lived in rural areas.

There were 287 households in Garrison, of which 35.9% had children under the age of 18 living in them. Of all households, 41.5% were married-couple households, 23.0% were households with a male householder and no spouse or partner present, and 30.0% were households with a female householder and no spouse or partner present. About 31.0% of all households were made up of individuals and 16.0% had someone living alone who was 65 years of age or older.

There were 354 housing units, of which 18.9% were vacant. The homeowner vacancy rate was 3.0% and the rental vacancy rate was 14.7%.

Racial composition as of the 2020 census
Race	Number	Percent
White	499	63.2%
Black or African American	198	25.1%
American Indian and Alaska Native	1	0.1%
Asian	4	0.5%
Native Hawaiian and Other Pacific Islander	0	0.0%
Some other race	35	4.4%
Two or more races	52	6.6%
Hispanic or Latino (of any race)	80	10.1%

=== 2010 census ===
As of 2010 Garrison had a population of 895. The median age was 38. The racial makeup of the population was 67.4% white, 24.8% black or African American, 1.3% Asian, 4.7% from some other race and 1.8% from two or more races. 9.3% of the population was Hispanic or Latino of any race.

=== 2000 census ===
As of the 2000 census, there were 844 people, 312 households, and 218 families residing in the city. The population density was 727.4 inhabitants per square mile (280.9/km^{2}). There were 372 housing units at an average density of 320.6 per square mile (123.8/km^{2}). The racial makeup of the city was 67.54% White, 29.03% African American, 0.71% Native American, 0.24% Asian, 1.18% from other races, and 1.30% from two or more races. Hispanic or Latino of any race were 3.32% of the population.

There were 312 households, out of which 32.7% had children under the age of 18 living with them, 45.8% were married couples living together, 20.5% had a female householder with no husband present, and 30.1% were non-families. 26.0% of all households were made up of individuals, and 17.9% had someone living alone who was 65 years of age or older. The average household size was 2.57 and the average family size was 3.10.

In the city, the population was spread out, with 28.8% under the age of 18, 7.8% from 18 to 24, 22.9% from 25 to 44, 17.1% from 45 to 64, and 23.5% who were 65 years of age or older. The median age was 38 years. For every 100 females, there were 85.9 males. For every 100 females age 18 and over, there were 76.8 males.

The median income for a household in the city was $20,278, and the median income for a family was $27,639. Males had a median income of $28,654 versus $22,143 for females. The per capita income for the city was $12,222. About 19.1% of families and 20.6% of the population were below the poverty line, including 21.5% of those under age 18 and 20.3% of those age 65 or over.

== Education ==
Garrison is served by the Garrison Independent School District and is home to the Garrison Bulldogs.
