= Illinois Route 165 =

State highway in Illinois, US

Illinois Route 165
- IL 165 highlighted in red

Route information
- Maintained by IDOT
- Length: 29.64 mi (47.70 km)
- Existed: 1924–present

Major junctions
- West end: IL 9 in Merna
- East end: IL 47 in Sibley

Location
- Country: United States
- State: Illinois
- Counties: McLean, Ford

Highway system
- Illinois State Highway System; Interstate; US; State; Tollways; Scenic
← IL 164	→ IL 166

Illinois Route 165 (IL 165) is a 29.64-mile-long (47.70 km) east–west state route in east-central Illinois. It runs from IL 9 east of Bloomington to IL 47 in Sibley. The route was established in 1924 along its current alignment. IL 165 is maintained by the Illinois Department of Transportation.

== Route description ==
Route 165 begins at an intersection with Illinois Route 9 in unincorporated McLean County east of Bloomington. It heads north through farmland into Towanda Township, passing through the community of Merna. The route turns east after leaving Merna and enters Blue Mound Township. Route 165 continues east to Cooksville, where it turns north before heading east into Martin Township. The route heads northeast before turning east along the northern border of Colfax. It continues east along the border between Martin and Lawndale townships, which becomes the border between Anchor and Cropsey townships. At Anchor, Route 165 heads north into Cropsey Township. It then turns east, crossing a railroad before entering Ford County. The route passes through Sullivant Township before terminating at Illinois Route 47 in Sibley. Illinois 165 is a rural undivided two-lane road for its entire length.

== History ==
Route 165 was designated along its current route under the 1924 State Bond Issue bill for the purpose of connecting Sibley, Anchor, Colfax, Cooksville, and Merna. It was first marked on the 1929 highway map; at this point, the route between Cooksville and Colfax had not been paved. The entire route was paved by 1930.

== Major intersections ==
County	Location	mi	km	Destinations	Notes
McLean	Bloomington	0.0	0.0	IL 9	
Ford	Sibley	29.6	47.6	IL 47	
1.000 mi = 1.609 km; 1.000 km = 0.621 mi
