= Muhammad (disambiguation) =

Muhammad (c. 570–632) was an Arab religious and political leader and the founder of Islam.

Muhammad or variations may also refer to:

- Muhammad (name), a given name and surname, and list of people with the name and its variations

== Geography ==
- Mohammad-e Olya, a village in Fars Province, Iran
- Mohammad, Gachsaran, a village in Kohgiluyeh and Boyer-Ahmad Province, Iran
- Mohammad, Kohgiluyeh, a village in Kohgiluyeh and Boyer-Ahmad Province, Iran
- Mohammad, Sistan and Baluchestan, a village in Sistan and Baluchestan Province, Iran

== Other uses ==
- Muhammad (book), a 1961 biographical book by Maxime Rodinson
- Muhammad (teddy bear), a teddy bear involved in a blasphemy prosecution in the Sudan
- Muhamed (horse)
- Muhammad (sura), 47th sura of the Qur'an
- Muhammad: The Last Prophet, 2002 American animated film
- Muhammadiyah, Indonesian Islamic Organization

== See also ==
- Mahomet (disambiguation), an archaic spelling of the name
- Muhammad: The Messenger of God (disambiguation)
- Mohammad's Army, a guerrilla organization operating in Iraq
- Mohammedia, a port city located 15 miles northeast of Casablanca in western Morocco
