= Mahomet =

Mahomet is an obsolete spelling of Muhammad's name. It may also refer to:

== Places ==
- Mahomet, Illinois, village in the United States
  - Mahomet Aquifer, aquifer in Mahomet, Central Illinois
  - Mahomet Township, Champaign County, Illinois, township in Mahomet, Illinois
  - Mahomet-Seymour High School, a high school in Mahomet, Illinois

== Other uses ==
- Mahomet the Prophet or Fanaticism, by Voltaire
