= Cropsey =

Cropsey may refer to:

== People ==
- Alan Cropsey (born 1952), Michigan politician
- Harman B. Cropsey (c. 1775–?), New York politician
- Harmon G. Cropsey (1917–2009), American politician and farmer
- James Church Cropsey, New York police commissioner
- Jasper Francis Cropsey (1823–1900), American landscape artist
- Joseph Cropsey (1919–2012), American political philosopher
- Seth Cropsey (born 1948), American politician

== Places ==
- Cropsey, Illinois
- Cropsey Township, McLean County, Illinois

== Other ==
- Cropsey Avenue, a major street in Brooklyn, New York
- Cropsey (film), a 2009 American film
