= Newcomb Township, Champaign County, Illinois =

Newcomb Township
- Township
- Location in Champaign County

- Champaign County's location in Illinois
- Coordinates: 40°16′14″N 88°24′26″W
- Country: United States
- State: Illinois
- County: Champaign
- Established: November 8, 1859

Area
  - Total: 36.37 sq mi (94.2 km^{2})
  - Land: 36.22 sq mi (93.8 km^{2})
  - Water: 0.15 sq mi (0.39 km^{2}) 0.41%
- Elevation: 738 ft (225 m)

Population (2020)
  - Total: 1,377
  - Density: 38.02/sq mi (14.68/km^{2})
- Time zone: UTC-6 (CST)
  - Summer (DST): UTC-5 (CDT)
- FIPS code: 17-019-52376

Newcomb Township is a township in Champaign County, Illinois, USA. As of the 2020 census, its population was 1,377 and it contained 526 housing units.

== Geography ==
Newcomb is coterminous with Congressional township 21 North, Range 7 East of the Third Principal Meridian.

According to the 2010 census, the township has a total area of 36.37 square miles (94.2 km^{2}), of which 36.22 square miles (93.8 km^{2}) (or 99.59%) is land and 0.15 square miles (0.39 km^{2}) (or 0.41%) is water. Illinois Route 47 crosses the township from north to south. U.S. Route 136 forms the northern boundary. The historically registered Hazen Bridge crosses the Sangamon River in the eastern part of this township.

=== Cities and towns ===
- Fisher (northeast quarter)

== Demographics ==
As of the 2020 census there were 1,377 people, 415 households, and 355 families residing in the township. The population density was 37.86 inhabitants per square mile (14.62/km^{2}). There were 526 housing units at an average density of 14.46 per square mile (5.58/km^{2}). The racial makeup of the township was 93.90% White, 0.51% African American, 0.07% Native American, 1.31% Asian, 0.00% Pacific Islander, 0.29% from other races, and 3.92% from two or more races. Hispanic or Latino of any race were 2.03% of the population.

There were 415 households, out of which 32.50% had children under the age of 18 living with them, 76.14% were married couples living together, 0.48% had a female householder with no spouse present, and 14.46% were non-families. 12.30% of all households were made up of individuals, and 4.80% had someone living alone who was 65 years of age or older. The average household size was 2.83 and the average family size was 3.07.

The township's age distribution consisted of 25.5% under the age of 18, 7.0% from 18 to 24, 13.9% from 25 to 44, 32.7% from 45 to 64, and 20.8% who were 65 years of age or older. The median age was 45.8 years. For every 100 females, there were 120.5 males. For every 100 females age 18 and over, there were 119.3 males.

The median income for a household in the township was $119,313, and the median income for a family was $119,188. Males had a median income of $81,000 versus $29,018 for females. The per capita income for the township was $48,454. About 1.1% of families and 0.7% of the population were below the poverty line.

Historical population
| Census | Pop. | Note | %± |
|---|---|---|---|
| 1870 | 897 | | — |
| 1880 | 992 | | 10.6% |
| 1890 | 959 | | −3.3% |
| 1900 | 854 | | −10.9% |
| 1910 | 744 | | −12.9% |
| 1920 | 755 | | 1.5% |
| 1930 | 643 | | −14.8% |
| 1940 | 664 | | 3.3% |
| 1950 | 529 | | −20.3% |
| 1960 | 526 | | −0.6% |
| 1970 | 617 | | 17.3% |
| 1980 | 805 | | 30.5% |
| 1990 | 921 | | 14.4% |
| 2000 | 1,041 | | 13.0% |
| 2010 | 1,292 | | 24.1% |
| 2020 | 1,377 | | 6.6% |
U.S. Decennial Census

== Natural gas storage area ==
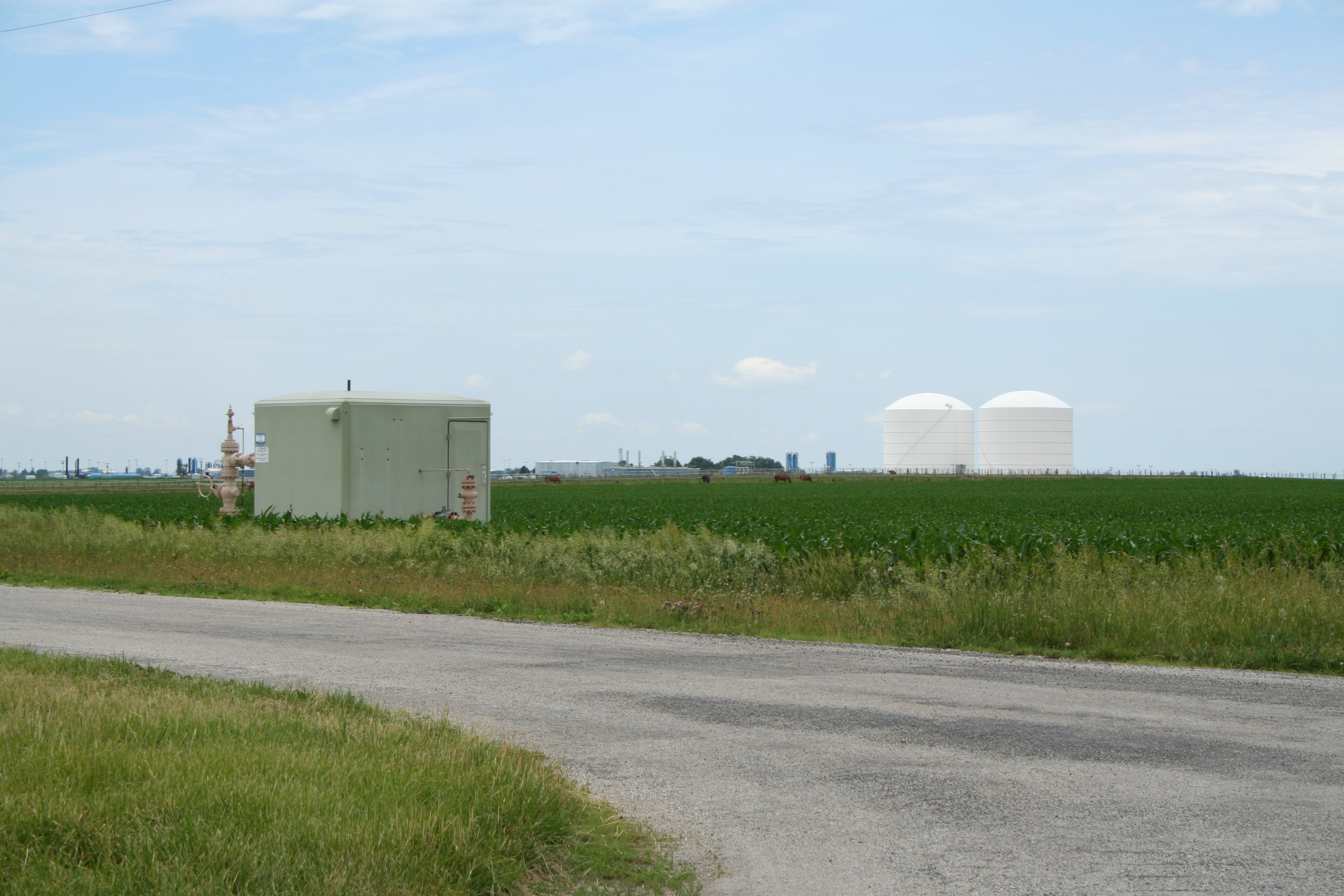
Peoples Gas Manlove Field Natural gas storage area. In the foreground is one of the numerous wells in the area with the LNG plant and tanks in the background.

Though the township is mostly farmland, it also contains the Manlove Field Natural gas storage area operated by Peoples Gas Light & Coke Company.(40°14′33″N 088°25′17″W) The storage facility is an underground aquifer opened in 1966 capable of storing around 150 billion cubic feet (4.2×10^{9} m^{3}) of natural gas for delivery to the Chicago area via connected pipelines. Peoples gas holds property easements covering around 32,000 acres (129.5 km^{2}) for the storage facility and co-located liquefied natural gas (LNG) plant.

=== Cemeteries ===
The township contains these cemeteries: Naylor (Section 3), Shiloh (Section 22, formerly Pancake Point), Phillippe (Section 36).

=== Major highways ===
- Illinois State Route 47

=== Airports and landing strips ===
- Furtney Airport

== History ==
Newcomb Township was created as a civil township in 1860, after Champaign County adopted the township form of government, and originally comprised two survey townships. It is said to have been named after Joseph Newcomb, an early settler. The eastern half of Newcomb Township was set off in 1867 to create Condit Township. An early post office (1857 to 1876) in northwest Condit Township, near Fisher, was called Newcomb.
