= Mahomet-Seymour High School =

Location
- 302 State Street; Mahomet, Illinois 61853; United States
- 40.202392°N 88.410324°W

Information
- School type: Public high school
- Opened: 1981
- Status: Operational
- School district: Mahomet-Seymour Community Unit School District 3
- NCES District ID: 1724060
- Superintendent: Kenny Lee
- CEEB code: 142720
- NCES School ID: 172406002627
- Principal: Chad Benedict
- Grades: 9 to 12
- Gender: coed
- Enrollment: 1,014 (2023-2024)
- Average class size: 247
- Student to teacher ratio: 16.49
- Campus type: Fringe Town
- Colors: Orange; Navy
- Athletics: IHSA
- Athletics conference: Apollo
- Sports: Baseball, basketball, cheer leading, cross country, dance, football, golf, soccer, softball, swimming, tennis, track and field, volleyball, wrestling
- Mascot: Bulldogs
- Accreditation: NCA
- Communities served: Mahomet, Seymour
- Feeder schools: Mahomet-Seymour Junior High School
- Website: mhs.mahometseymour.org
- Last updated: 26 Apr 2023

Mahomet-Seymour High School, abbreviated MSHS, is a public high school in Mahomet, Illinois. It is a part of Mahomet-Seymour Community Unit School District 3.

== History ==
Mahomet High School, the Bulldogs, and Seymour High School, the Panthers, were originally separate high schools in separate districts. In the late 1940s, consolidation talks between the Mahomet and Seymour school districts took place and, on July 1, 1948, the two districts merged to create the Mahomet-Seymour School District.

When Mahomet-Seymour School District was formed, the high school was established in Mahomet. The original Mahomet High School building was used as Mahomet-Seymour High School until 1961, when a new building was erected. The original building continued in use as the Mahomet-Seymour Grade School for several years.

The current Mahomet-Seymour High School building was erected in 1981 and has since undergone expansion as the community of Mahomet continues to grow. The latest expansion was completed in August 2000 and brought 16,000 sq ft (1,500 m^{2}). (when completed the building was over 80,000 sq ft (7,000 m^{2})) of additional space to the building, increased student capacity to 1,100, and cost $8,701,400. As of the 2022-2023 school year, the school has an enrollment of 987 students and a faculty of fifty-five full-time teachers.

On May 5, 2007, school board members unanimously approved a Mahomet-Seymour Schools Foundation plan to raise money to build a greenhouse. In early 2008, the greenhouse was pronounced to be ready for spring. It is currently fully operational and functional for students in Agriculture classes to use.

== Academics ==
The Chicago Sun-Times ranked MSHS 34th based on state test scores in 2013.

The Chicago Sun-Times ranked MSHS 28th in 2018-2019.

In 2023, Niche gave MSHS a Niche Grade of A+ and ranked the school #30 out of 696 for Best Public High School Teachers in Illinois. Niche also ranked the school #55 out of 698 for Best Public High Schools in Illinois.

U.S. News ranked MSHS #63 in Illinois High Schools and #1 in the Champaign, IL Metro Area High Schools in 2022.

== Athletics ==
Mahomet-Seymour High School offers baseball, basketball, cheerleading, cross country, dance, football, golf, soccer, softball, swimming, tennis, track and field, volleyball, and wrestling. It has won 6 IHSA State trophies since 2010.

Mahomet-Seymour High School also offers bass fishing

Mahomet-Seymour boys golf won the 2A IHSA State meet in 2010.

Mahomet-Seymour dance team won the 1A IHSA State meet in 2015.

Mahomet-Seymour boys cross country won the 2A IHSA State meet in 2016 and 2017. They also were runner-up in the 2A IHSA State meet in 2014 and 2015.

== Extracurricular activities ==
Mahomet-Seymour's marching band, the Marching Bulldogs, placed first out of eight teams in the Fiesta Bowl parade in 2019. Mahomet-Seymour's math team took the state championship in 2021 and 2019, 3rd place in 2018, and back to back champions in 2017 and 2016.

== Notable alumni ==
- Blake Wolters (born 2004), American professional baseball player in the Kansas City Royals organization
