= Colfax, Illinois =

- Village
- Location in McLean County, Illinois
- Coordinates: 40°34′00″N 88°36′58″W
- Country: United States
- State: Illinois
- County: McLean
- Township: Martin

Area
  - Total: 0.55 sq mi (1.43 km^{2})
  - Land: 0.55 sq mi (1.43 km^{2})
  - Water: 0 sq mi (0.00 km^{2})
- Elevation: 755 ft (230 m)

Population (2020)
  - Total: 996
  - Density: 1,799.6/sq mi (694.82/km^{2})
- Time zone: UTC-6 (CST)
  - Summer (DST): UTC-5 (CDT)
- ZIP code: 61728
- Area code: 309
- FIPS code: 17-15495
- GNIS ID: 2398598
- Website: colfaxillinois.com

Colfax is a village in McLean County, Illinois, United States. The population was 996 at the 2020 census. It is part of the Bloomington–Normal Metropolitan Statistical Area.

== History ==
=== Founding ===
Colfax was laid out on March 22, 1880, by James E. Wood (1818 – 1908). Anderson was born in Indiana and had come to McLean County about 1855 as State Missionary for the Christian Church. He stayed and became a farmer, a banker, and a lifelong promoter of Colfax. To locals, Anderson was affectionately known as "Uncle Billy". The northeastern townships of the county were among the last to be served by railroads. After many false starts the Clinton, Bloomington, and Northwestern Railroad began making its way westward from Kankakee. It was aided by contributions in cash and land for the right-of-way by many local farmers. Cropsey, Anchor, and Cooksville were all laid out at the same time as Colfax. The first train arrived in Colfax on July 4, 1880. For two years the track extended only from Kankakee to Colfax, and a turntable was installed to send the trains back eastwards. Eventually the tracks were completed to Bloomington. The railroad soon became part of the Illinois Central system.

Colfax is one of several communities in the United States named for Schuyler Colfax, the Speaker of the U.S. House of Representatives during the terms of Abraham Lincoln and Andrew Johnson and Vice President during the Ulysses S. Grant presidency. Others communities include Colfax, California; Colfax, Indiana; Colfax, Louisiana; Colfax, North Carolina and Colfax, Washington.

=== Original design and early growth ===
The original town of Colfax was a rectangle on the north side of the railroad tracks. There were twelve blocks, each with eight or sixteen small lots, and an additional four blocks, each with a single larger lot, were located along the western edge of the original town, for a total of one hundred lots. These faced a widened area of railroad land, which ran the full length of the original town. No other public spaces were designated, but Main Street, which ran parallel to the tracks and one block to the north, was wider than the other streets. The depot was on the north side of the tracks, and the early elevator, lumber yard and stock yard were on the south side. William Rinker erected the first store, which sold groceries. Another grocery store, Wilson and Santee, followed. The third store was a somewhat larger two-story structure built by D.A. Green, who had moved his operation into Colfax from Potosi near the McLean County–Livingston County border. Green sold groceries, dry goods and drugs.

=== Coal mining ===
In 1886 a company was formed to open the first of two coal mines at Colfax. The first to be opened was the shaft just west of town. Frank Seymour and Sons were paid fourteen dollars a foot to sink the shaft. They encountered problems with water and cave ins and were soon slowed by the need to blast their way through limestone layers before reaching the coal seams. The railroad was unable to bring in sufficient shoring for the shaft, and additional timber had to be hauled in by wagon. At 140 feet (43 m) they struck a narrow vein of coal, but excavators had to go down to 392 feet (119 m) before finding a productive 5 1/2-foot-thick (1.7 m) seam of coal. Miners were brought in, and the first coal was taken in June 1888. Financial troubles and rapid changes of ownership soon followed. The organization of a company to open a second shaft, this one east of town, began in December 1891, but it was June 1894 before digging could begin.

The east shaft encountered great difficulties with water and with layers of quicksand. After many delays and extensive pumping, coal was found in 1895, but trouble with financing delayed production for two years. The 200 miners who flooded into Colfax encountered an acute shortage of housing, which was not solved until a large number of small miners' cottages could be built: a few of these may still be found in Colfax. Financial troubles quickly mounted. In May 1892 the east shaft had to be sold at auction. In 1901 and 1902 almost 60,000 tons of coal were being taken out of the mines, but increased difficulty with finances soon reduced production. Once the mines were opened, unions were organized and strikes followed. Mining at Colfax proved to be a deadly business; between 1889 and 1902 eleven miners died, most of them crushed by falling rock. The west shaft produced most of the coal, but was closed in 1904. This mine remained idle for many years until being briefly re-opened as a cooperative venture between 1921 and 1924. Eventually the abandoned shaft became a rubbish dump and was eventually filled.

=== Growth of the town ===
Once established, Colfax grew rapidly. In 1892 a tile factory was built in the northeast corner of town; as was often the case in central Illinois, the former tile factory grounds eventually became a small park. A cigar factory was built. About the same time, a small factory for the manufacture of tin cans started production. By 1888 Colfax had a newspaper, the Colfax Leader. Electric lights came in 1895. Four churches began soon after the town was founded: Christian, Methodist, Presbyterian, and Roman Catholic. William H. Anderson, who raised Standard Bred and Road Bred horses, had a half-mile horse track just east of town. After the mines closed, Colfax settled into a quieter life as the commercial hub of a prosperous grain-growing area. However, eastern McLean County has been an area of little population growth, and the population of Colfax, which peaked in 1900, has remained nearly unchanged since 1910.

== Geography ==
Colfax is located in eastern McLean County. Illinois Route 165 runs along the northern border of the village, leading west-southwest 26 miles (42 km) to Bloomington, the county seat, and east 13 miles (21 km) to Sibley.

According to the U.S. Census Bureau, Colfax has a total area of 0.55 square miles (1.42 km^{2}), all land. The Mackinaw River, a west-flowing tributary of the Illinois River, crosses the southwest corner of the village. Colfax Creek, a tributary of the Mackinaw, flows through the middle of the village.

== Demographics ==
Historical population
Census	Pop.	Note	%±
1880	105		—
1900	1,158		—
1910	965		−16.7%
1920	976		1.1%
1930	803		−17.7%
1940	821		2.2%
1950	819		−0.2%
1960	894		9.2%
1970	935		4.6%
1980	920		−1.6%
1990	854		−7.2%
2000	989		15.8%
2010	1,061		7.3%
2020	996		−6.1%
Decennial US Census

As of the census of 2000, there were 989 people, 395 households, and 253 families residing in the village. The population density was 1,829.4 inhabitants per square mile (706.3/km^{2}). There were 422 housing units at an average density of 780.6 per square mile (301.4/km^{2}). The racial makeup of the village was 99.09% White, 0.51% Native American, 0.20% from other races, and 0.20% from two or more races. Hispanic or Latino of any race were 1.42% of the population.

There were 395 households, out of which 28.4% had children under the age of 18 living with them, 55.7% were married couples living together, 6.3% had a female householder with no husband present, and 35.7% were non-families. 32.2% of all households were made up of individuals, and 16.5% had someone living alone who was 65 years of age or older. The average household size was 2.39 and the average family size was 3.06.

In the village, the population was spread out, with 25.3% under the age of 18, 6.5% from 18 to 24, 27.0% from 25 to 44, 18.3% from 45 to 64, and 23.0% who were 65 years of age or older. The median age was 40 years. For every 100 females, there were 93.5 males. For every 100 females age 18 and over, there were 83.4 males.

The median income for a household in the village was $41,544, and the median income for a family was $50,500. Males had a median income of $31,875 versus $23,438 for females. The per capita income for the village was $17,993. About 0.8% of families and 3.1% of the population were below the poverty line, including 1.2% of those under age 18 and 5.6% of those age 65 or over.
