= Mabery Gelvin Botanical Garden =

Botanical garden in Mahomet, Illinois

Coordinates: 40.2038°N 88.3943°W

- Interactive map of Mabery Gelvin Botanical Garden
- Type: Botanical garden
- Nearest city: Mahomet, Illinois
- Area: 8 acres (3.2 ha)
- Opened: June 30, 1974
- Founder: H.I. Gelvin
- Open: Daily, daylight hours

The Mabery Gelvin Botanical Garden (8 acres (3.2 ha)) is a botanical garden located within the Lake of the Woods Forest Preserve. It is located just off State Route 47, 1 mile (1.6 km) north of Interstate 74, in Mahomet, Illinois.

== History ==
The garden is named after H.I. Gelvin's wife, Mabery, who died in 1971.

Gelvin, as founder of the Forest Preserve District, donated $100,000 to build a garden and designed the garden with the aid of University of Illinois students. The garden was dedicated on June 30, 1974.

In 2014, renovations were conducted to bolster the garden's infrastructure, such as the waterfall, pond, and accessible paths. A ceremony was held on September 12, 2019, to celebrate the completion.

In March 2022, the Illinois Department of Natural Resources Museum Capital Grant Program awarded $726,900 in grant funding to the Champaign County Forest Preserve District. The grant helped provide plant production space and upgrade greenhouse infrastructure.

== Features ==
The garden includes waterfalls, a Japanese style red bridge, and a one-acre koi pond. The waterfall and pond are inspired by the Chicago Botanic Garden.

An All-America Selections Display Garden features bedding plants and vegetables.

== Operations ==
It is open during daylight hours; admission is free. Wedding rentals are permitted at this facility.

== See also ==
- Lake of the Woods Forest Preserve
- List of botanical gardens in the United States
