= Scott Township, Champaign County, Illinois =

Scott Township
- Township
- Location in Champaign County

- Champaign County's location in Illinois
- Coordinates: 40°06′15″N 88°23′51″W
- Country: United States
- State: Illinois
- County: Champaign

Area
  - Total: 35.88 sq mi (92.9 km^{2})
  - Land: 35.88 sq mi (92.9 km^{2})
  - Water: 0 sq mi (0 km^{2}) 0%
- Elevation: 719 ft (219 m)

Population (2020)
  - Total: 999
  - Density: 27.8/sq mi (10.8/km^{2})
- Time zone: UTC-6 (CST)
  - Summer (DST): UTC-5 (CDT)
- FIPS code: 17-019-68289

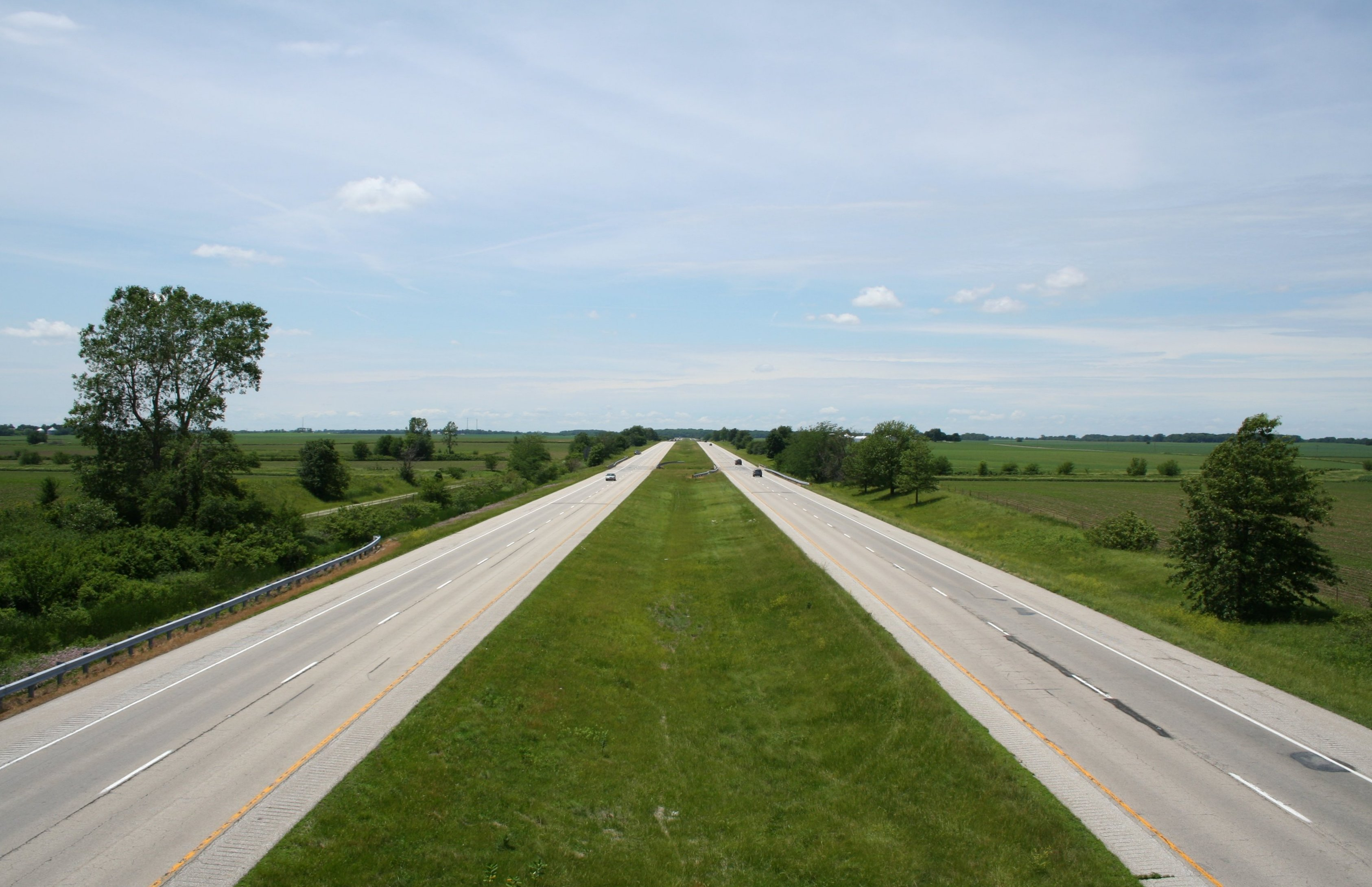
A section of I-72, north of Seymour, Illinois, facing west overlooking section 8 and in the distance section 7 of Scott township.

Scott Township is a township in Champaign County, Illinois, USA. As of the 2020 census, its population was 999 and it contained 456 housing units.

== History ==
Scott Township was formed when Middletown Township was split on an unknown date.

== Geography ==
Scott is Township 19 North, Range 7 East of the Third Principal Meridian.

According to the 2010 census, the township has a total area of 35.88 square miles (92.9 km^{2}), all land. The stream of South Fork Camp Creek runs through this township.

== Demographics ==
As of the 2020 census there were 999 people, 447 households, and 301 families residing in the township. The population density was 27.84 inhabitants per square mile (10.75/km^{2}). There were 456 housing units at an average density of 12.71 per square mile (4.91/km^{2}). The racial makeup of the township was 88.49% White, 1.80% African American, 0.20% Native American, 0.30% Asian, 0.00% Pacific Islander, 1.30% from other races, and 7.91% from two or more races. Hispanic or Latino of any race were 2.70% of the population.

There were 447 households, out of which 32.70% had children under the age of 18 living with them, 61.07% were married couples living together, 2.46% had a female householder with no spouse present, and 32.66% were non-families. 22.40% of all households were made up of individuals, and 6.70% had someone living alone who was 65 years of age or older. The average household size was 2.48 and the average family size was 2.95.

The township's age distribution consisted of 18.3% under the age of 18, 8.2% from 18 to 24, 20.1% from 25 to 44, 33.9% from 45 to 64, and 19.5% who were 65 years of age or older. The median age was 47.5 years. For every 100 females, there were 111.4 males. For every 100 females age 18 and over, there were 89.4 males.

The median income for a household in the township was $94,375, and the median income for a family was $142,549. Males had a median income of $56,024 versus $42,396 for females. The per capita income for the township was $41,921. About 2.7% of families and 5.2% of the population were below the poverty line, including none of those under age 18 and 4.1% of those age 65 or over.

Historical population
Census	Pop.	Note	%±
2010	1,258		—
2020	999		−20.6%
U.S. Decennial Census

== Road Commissioner ==
The current road commissioner in Scott Township is Jeff Sebens.

=== Cities and towns ===
- Bondville

=== Unincorporated towns ===
- Seymour

(This list is based on USGS data and may include former settlements.)

=== Major highways ===
- Interstate 72
- Illinois State Route 10
- Illinois State Route 47

=== Airports and landing strips ===
- Igoe Heliport
- Litchfield RLA Airport
