= Mahomet Township, Champaign County, Illinois =

Mahomet Township
- Township
- Location in Champaign County

- Champaign County's location in Illinois
- Coordinates: 40°11′07″N 88°24′23″W
- Country: United States
- State: Illinois
- County: Champaign

Area
  - Total: 33.24 sq mi (86.1 km^{2})
  - Land: 32.95 sq mi (85.3 km^{2})
  - Water: 0.28 sq mi (0.73 km^{2}) 0.84%
- Elevation: 702 ft (214 m)

Population (2020)
  - Total: 13,697
  - Density: 415.7/sq mi (160.5/km^{2})
- Time zone: UTC-6 (CST)
  - Summer (DST): UTC-5 (CDT)
- FIPS code: 17-019-46149

Mahomet Township is a township in Champaign County, Illinois, USA. As of the 2020 census, its population was 13,697 and it contained 5,391 housing units.

== History ==
Mahomet Township formed when Middletown Township split on an unknown date. Current Mahomet Township Supervisor is Robert LaRoe. Current Mahomet Township Road Commissioner is Jackson Craig.

== Geography ==
Mahomet is Township 20 North, Range 7 East of the Third Principal Meridian.

According to the 2010 census, the township has a total area of 33.24 square miles (86.1 km^{2}), of which 32.95 square miles (85.3 km^{2}) (or 99.13%) is land and 0.28 square miles (0.73 km^{2}) (or 0.84%) is water.

=== Cities and towns ===
- Lake of the Woods
- Mahomet (vast majority)

=== Cemeteries ===
The township contains these cemeteries: Bethel (Section 34), Bryant (Section 22), Cain-Shaefer, Mahomet (Section 15, formerly Middletown), Porter-Dwan, Riverside (Section 10) and Seymour Methodist Episcopal.

=== Major highways ===
- Interstate 74
- U.S. Route 150
- Illinois State Route 47

== Demographics ==
As of the 2020 census there were 13,697 people, 4,677 households, and 3,786 families residing in the township. The population density was 411.89 inhabitants per square mile (159.03/km^{2}). There were 5,391 housing units at an average density of 162.12 per square mile (62.59/km^{2}). The racial makeup of the township was 89.89% White, 0.88% African American, 0.23% Native American, 2.06% Asian, 0.06% Pacific Islander, 0.96% from other races, and 5.92% from two or more races. Hispanic or Latino of any race were 3.34% of the population.

There were 4,677 households, out of which 43.10% had children under the age of 18 living with them, 68.53% were married couples living together, 8.74% had a female householder with no spouse present, and 19.05% were non-families. 16.90% of all households were made up of individuals, and 8.00% had someone living alone who was 65 years of age or older. The average household size was 2.91 and the average family size was 3.28.

The township's age distribution consisted of 30.3% under the age of 18, 8.0% from 18 to 24, 26.1% from 25 to 44, 25% from 45 to 64, and 10.7% who were 65 years of age or older. The median age was 35.8 years. For every 100 females, there were 92.3 males. For every 100 females age 18 and over, there were 90.9 males.

The median income for a household in the township was $97,114, and the median income for a family was $108,506. Males had a median income of $62,424 versus $43,302 for females. The per capita income for the township was $38,161. About 2.4% of families and 3.1% of the population were below the poverty line, including 1.8% of those under age 18 and 1.3% of those age 65 or over.

Historical population
Census	Pop.	Note	%±
2010	12,623		—
2020	13,697		8.5%
U.S. Decennial Census
