= Cooksville, Illinois =

- Village
- Location in McLean County, Illinois
- Coordinates: 40°32′34″N 88°42′53″W
- Country: United States
- State: Illinois
- County: McLean
- Township: Blue Mound

Area
  - Total: 0.22 sq mi (0.56 km^{2})
  - Land: 0.22 sq mi (0.56 km^{2})
  - Water: 0 sq mi (0.00 km^{2})
- Elevation: 768 ft (234 m)

Population (2020)
  - Total: 157
  - Density: 724/sq mi (279.7/km^{2})
- Time zone: UTC-6 (CST)
  - Summer (DST): UTC-5 (CDT)
- ZIP code: 61730
- Area code: 309
- FIPS code: 17-16210
- GNIS ID: 2398622

Cooksville is a village in McLean County, Illinois, United States. The population was 157 at the 2020 census. It is part of the Bloomington–Normal Metropolitan Statistical Area.

== History ==
=== Founding ===
Cooksville was laid out under the name "Kochsville" on December 4, 1882, by Frederick Wilhelm Koch (1829 – 1900). Within a year of its founding the name was changed to Cooksville. Koch was a Bloomington real estate dealer. He was born in Westphalia, in what is now Germany, and arrived in the United States on November 6, 1854. Koch was in Bloomington by 1860. He sold thirty or forty lots near his home in west Bloomington, and this neighborhood soon became known as Kochsville, giving Koch the distinction of having two McLean County places named in his honor. Cooksville was founded when the Clinton, Bloomington and Northeastern Railroad was finished from Colfax to Bloomington; in 1880 the part of the railroad from Kankakee to Colfax had been finished, resulting in the 1880 founding of Cropsey, Anchor, and Colfax; but the remainder of the railroad was delayed for two years. The railroad was soon taken over by the Illinois Central and was sometimes known as the Bloomer Line. After requests for the grain elevators to join Alliance Grain, operator of the Bloomer Line, were denied, the tracks from Colfax to Cooksville were removed. This left road transportation as the only available method for grain.

=== Design and growth ===
Cooksville was incorporated in December 1901. The population of the village peaked in 1910 with 332 people. The design of the original town of Cooksville was a rectangle north of the tracks with the southern blocks slightly truncated because the railroad did not run exactly east and west. The original town contained about 55 lots. The depot was on the north side of the tracks and the two early elevators on the south side. Soon small additions were laid out south of the tracks and on the east side of the original town. In 1883 William G. Darnell established the first grain elevator in Cooksville. Harvey W. Crumbacker also moved to the town in 1883. He established a hardware store and in 1902 built a two-story brick building in the town.

== Geography ==
Cooksville is in eastern McLean County, 18 miles (29 km) east-northeast of Bloomington, the county seat. Illinois Route 165 touches the northwest part of the village leading west-southwest toward Bloomington and east-northeast 20 miles (32 km) to Sibley.

According to the U.S. Census Bureau, Cooksville has a total area of 0.22 square miles (0.57 km^{2}), all land. The village is in the watershed of the Mackinaw River, a west-flowing tributary of the Illinois River.

== Demographics ==
Historical population
Census	Pop.	Note	%±
1910	332		—
1920	297		−10.5%
1930	324		9.1%
1940	269		−17.0%
1950	256		−4.8%
1960	221		−13.7%
1970	241		9.0%
1980	259		7.5%
1990	211		−18.5%
2000	213		0.9%
2010	182		−14.6%
2020	157		−13.7%
Decennial US Census

As of the census of 2000, there were 213 people, 91 households, and 64 families residing in the village. The population density was 917.9 inhabitants per square mile (354.4/km^{2}). There were 94 housing units at an average density of 405.1 per square mile (156.4/km^{2}). The racial makeup of the village was 99.53% White, 0.47% from other races. Hispanic or Latino of any race were 0.47% of the population.

There were 91 households, out of which 28.6% had children under the age of 18 living with them, 59.3% were married couples living together, 12.1% had a female householder with no husband present, and 28.6% were non-families. 25.3% of all households were made up of individuals, and 12.1% had someone living alone who was 65 years of age or older. The average household size was 2.34 and the average family size was 2.82.

In the village, the population was spread out, with 23.5% under the age of 18, 9.9% from 18 to 24, 29.6% from 25 to 44, 25.8% from 45 to 64, and 11.3% who were 65 years of age or older. The median age was 37 years. For every 100 females, there were 85.2 males. For every 100 females age 18 and over, there were 83.1 males. For 20 years, Cooksville was home to Congressman Kath and his wife, Doris.

The median income for a household in the village was $41,094, and the median income for a family was $48,125. Males had a median income of $31,563 versus $23,594 for females. The per capita income for the village was $16,984. None of the families and 0.8% of the population were living below the poverty line.

== Education ==
Cooksville is within Ridgeview School District.
