= Lake of the Woods Forest Preserve =

County park in Illinois, USA

Coordinates: 40.203°N 88.391°W

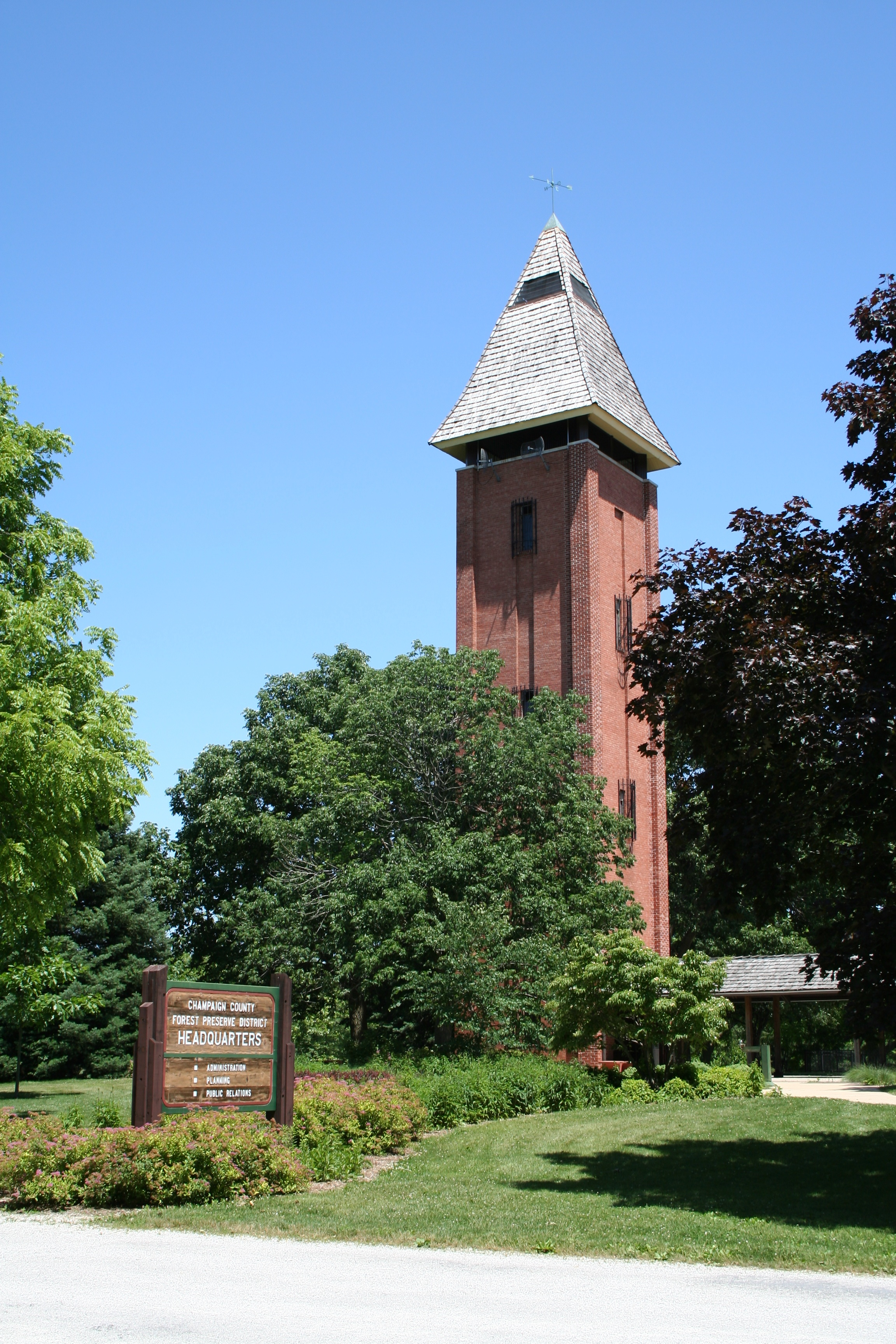
- Carillon tower at Lake of the Woods Forest Preserve, Lake of the Woods, Illinois.
- Interactive map of Lake of the Woods Forest Preserve
- Nearest city: Lake of the Woods, Illinois and Mahomet, Illinois
- Area: 900 acres (360 ha)
- Established: 1948
- Operator: Champaign County Forest Preserves

Lake of the Woods Forest Preserve is a park and nature reserve of 900 acres (360 ha) in size, located adjacent to the communities of Lake of the Woods and Mahomet, in the US State of Illinois. It is operated by the Champaign County Forest Preserve District, a special district serving Champaign County, Illinois, which has built their headquarters in the park.

== History ==
The forest preserve district opened its forest preserve here in 1948.

== Features ==
=== Museum ===
The forest preserve is the host site of the Museum of the Grand Prairie, a living history facility that specializes in the human ecology of the former tallgrass prairie townships of eastern Illinois. The museum features an exhibit on the 1850s-era law practice of Abraham Lincoln, a reconstructed blacksmith shop, and children's museum installations. As a private-sector lawyer, Lincoln's practice encompassed a circuit of Illinois counties that included Champaign County.

=== Botanical garden ===
The forest preserve is also the host site of the 8 acres (3.2 ha) Mabery Gelvin Botanical Garden, a botanical garden located south of the Museum of the Grand Prairie and featuring displays of bedding plants. In addition, a parcel of forest preserve land has been replanted as the Buffalo Trace Prairie, containing both restored tallgrass prairie and woodland, matching the ecosystem that is celebrated in the museum located immediately to the east.

=== Facility rentals ===
Lake of the Woods allows visitors to rent 7 different facilities as well as wedding rentals at the Mabery Gelvin Botanical Garden. These facilities are available for partial day and full day rentals.

=== Carillon ===
The 100 foot (30 m)-tall HI-Tower Bell Carillon, which can be climbed by visitors, and a reconstructed covered bridge round out the list of forest preserve attractions.

== Access ==
The nearest limited-access highway exit to the park is Exit #172 on Interstate 74, near Mahomet.
