= Lake of the Woods, Illinois =

- Census-designated place
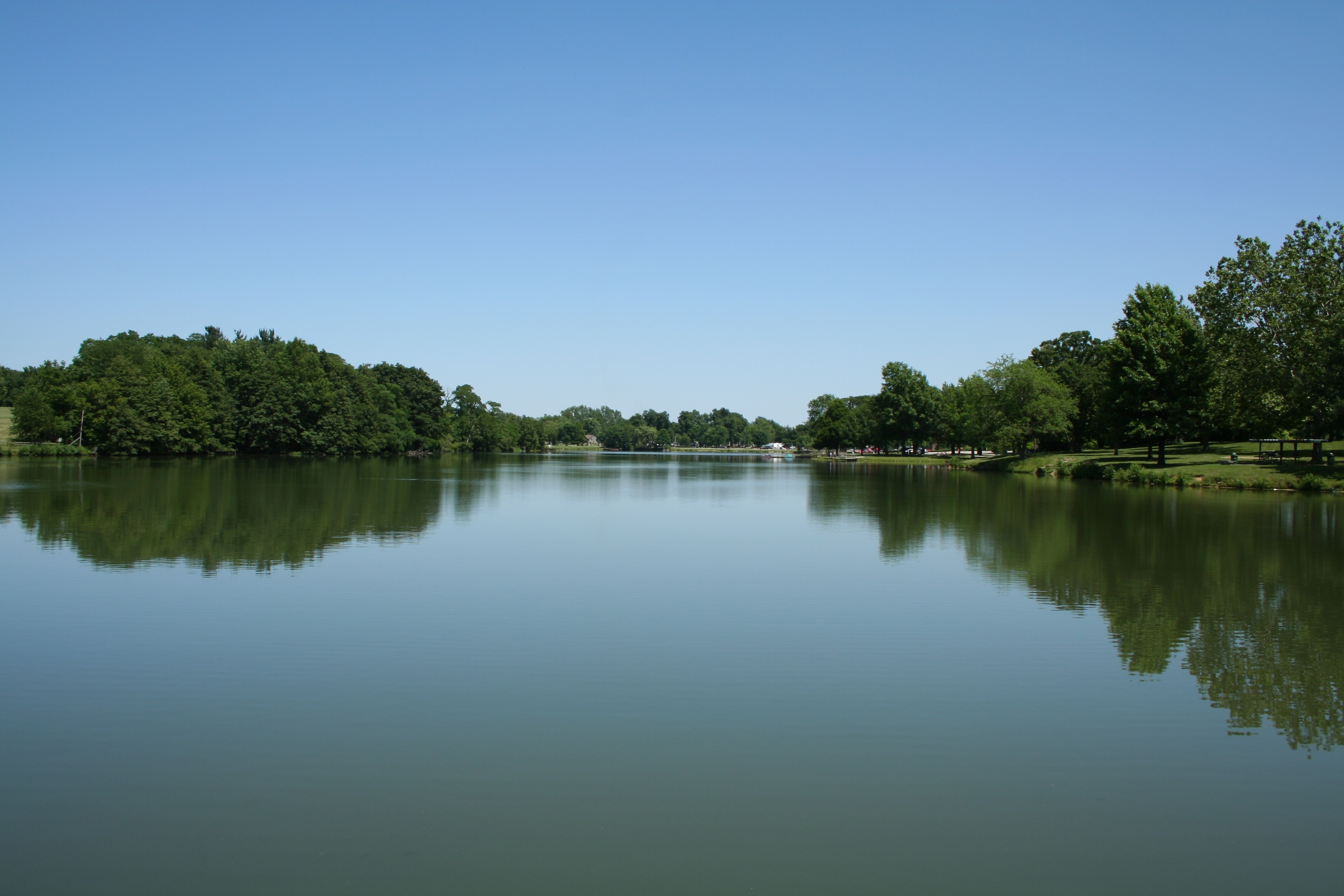
- Lake of the Woods (after which the community is named)
- Interactive map of Lake of the Woods, Illinois
- Coordinates: 40°12′17″N 88°22′36″W
- Country: United States
- State: Illinois
- County: Champaign
- Township: Mahomet

Area
  - Total: 1.76 sq mi (4.57 km^{2})
  - Land: 1.68 sq mi (4.36 km^{2})
  - Water: 0.085 sq mi (0.22 km^{2})
- Elevation: 742 ft (226 m)

Population (2020)
  - Total: 2,403
  - Density: 1,428.3/sq mi (551.47/km^{2})
- Time zone: UTC-6 (CST)
  - Summer (DST): UTC-5 (CDT)
- ZIP code: 61853
- Area code: 217
- FIPS code: 17-41346
- GNIS feature ID: 2393082

Lake of the Woods is a census-designated place in Champaign County, Illinois, United States. The population was 2,403 at the 2020 census. Lake of the Woods is located in Mahomet Township and mostly surrounded by the northeast part of the village of Mahomet.

== Geography ==
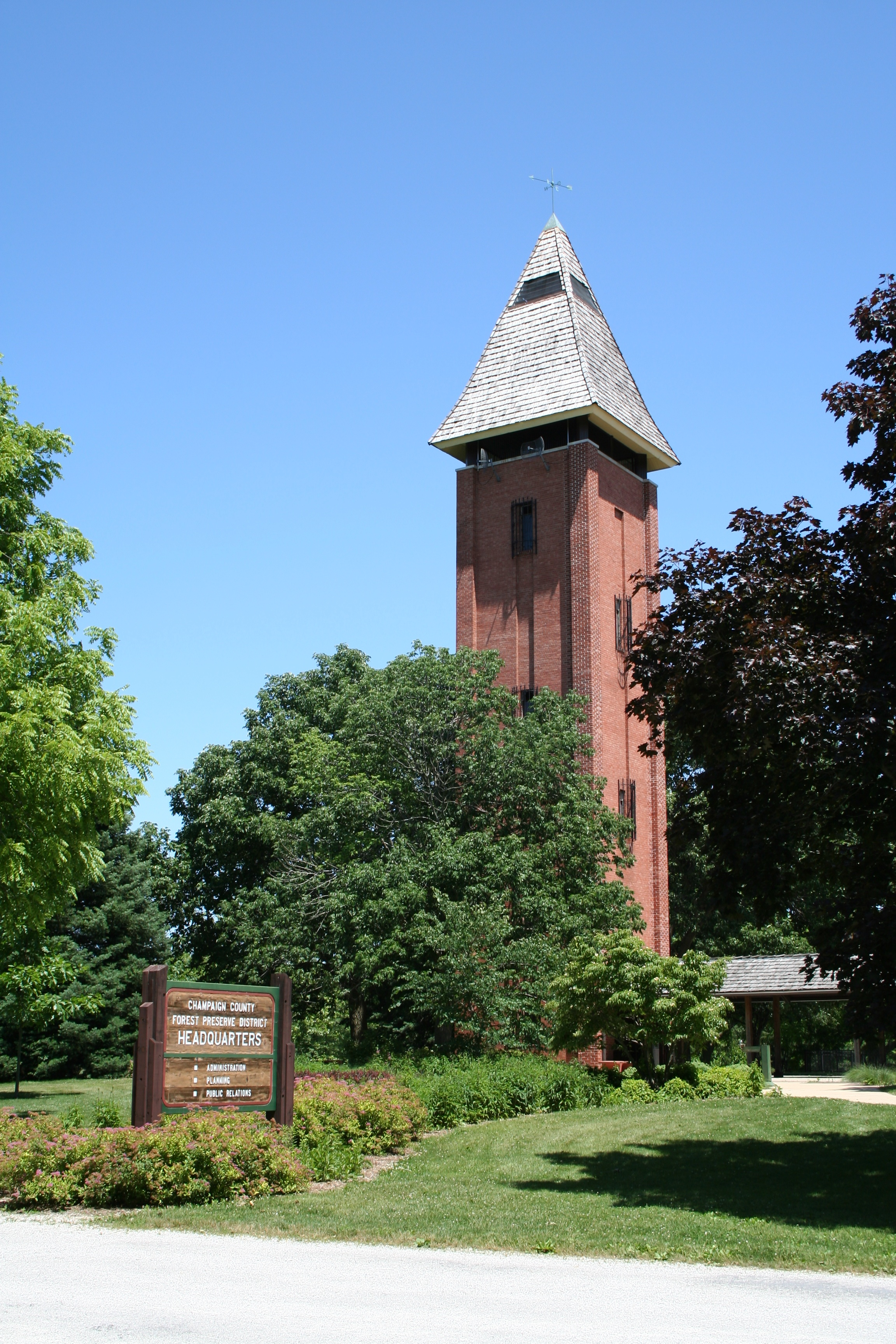
"HI Tower" at the Champaign County Forest Preserve District Headquarters in Lake of the Woods Forest Preserve, Mahomet, Illinois.

According to the 2021 census gazetteer files, Lake of the Woods has a total area of 1.77 square miles (4.58 km^{2}), of which 1.68 square miles (4.35 km^{2}) (or 95.24%) is land and 0.08 square miles (0.21 km^{2}) (or 4.76%) is water.

== Demographics ==
Historical population
Census	Pop.	Note	%±
2000	3,026		—
2010	2,912		−3.8%
2020	2,403		−17.5%
U.S. Decennial Census

=== 2020 census ===
As of the 2020 census, Lake of the Woods had a population of 2,403. The median age was 39.8 years. 24.8% of residents were under the age of 18 and 17.2% of residents were 65 years of age or older. For every 100 females there were 95.5 males, and for every 100 females age 18 and over there were 96.7 males age 18 and over.

92.6% of residents lived in urban areas, while 7.4% lived in rural areas.

There were 993 households in Lake of the Woods, of which 31.0% had children under the age of 18 living in them. Of all households, 49.7% were married-couple households, 17.3% were households with a male householder and no spouse or partner present, and 25.5% were households with a female householder and no spouse or partner present. About 24.8% of all households were made up of individuals and 10.9% had someone living alone who was 65 years of age or older.

There were 1,072 housing units, of which 7.4% were vacant. The homeowner vacancy rate was 1.2% and the rental vacancy rate was 23.3%. The housing unit density was 607.02 units per square mile (234.37 units/km^{2}) and the population density was 1,360.70 inhabitants per square mile (525.37/km^{2}).

Racial composition as of the 2020 census
Race	Number	Percent
White	2,146	89.3%
Black or African American	13	0.5%
American Indian and Alaska Native	7	0.3%
Asian	13	0.5%
Native Hawaiian and Other Pacific Islander	0	0.0%
Some other race	43	1.8%
Two or more races	181	7.5%
Hispanic or Latino (of any race)	90	3.7%

=== Income and poverty ===
The median income for a household in the CDP was $59,257, and the median income for a family was $90,556. Males had a median income of $44,133 versus $40,000 for females. The per capita income for the CDP was $26,662. About 9.1% of families and 7.3% of the population were below the poverty line, including 8.8% of those under age 18 and 5.2% of those age 65 or over.

== Education ==
It is in the Mahomet-Seymour Community Unit School District 3.
