= Mahomet-Seymour Community Unit School District 3 =

School district in Champaign County, Illinois, United States

Address
- 1301 S. Bulldog Dr. Mahomet, Champaign County, Illinois, 61853; United States

District information
- Type: Public
- Grades: PreK to 12
- President: Max McComb
- Superintendent: Dr. Kenny Lee
- Schools: 1 early childhood center 2 elementary schools 1 junior high school 1 high school
- Budget: $32,001,195
- NCES District ID: 1724060

Students and staff
- Students: 2,980
- Teachers: 183

Other information
- Website: www.mahometseymour.org

Mahomet-Seymour Community Unit School District 3 also known as Mahomet-Seymour Community Schools and Mahomet-Seymour CUSD 3 is a school district in Champaign County, Illinois. The district has 2,980 students and 183 instructors spread over five schools.

It includes Mahomet, Seymour, and Lake of the Woods.

== Schools ==
=== Middletown Prairie Elementary School ===
Middletown Prairie enrolls students in grades Pre-K to 2nd.

=== Lincoln Trail Elementary School ===
Lincoln Trail has students enrolled over three grade levels (3rd-5th).

=== Mahomet-Seymour Junior High School ===
Built in 1961, the building that is now MSJH was originally Mahomet-Seymour High School. In 1981 the high school moved to its current building. MSJH has gone through many renovations and additions, including ten new rooms in 1994. MSJH also has three portable buildings outside of the main school. As of the 2024-2025 school year, MSJH has an enrollment of 793 students across the three grade levels of 6th to 8th. The floor in the Blue Gym was originally the flooring at the University of Illinois' State Farm Center (originally Assembly Hall).

== Reaction to COVID-19 outbreak ==
In 2020, the district returned to activity at the start of the school year. The district offered both in-person and virtual instruction. Each school had differing plans, however all schools did not have in-person instruction on Monday. Masks were used inside the building. As of November 12, 2020, the Champaign Urbana Public Health Department recommended that all schools in Champaign County close as soon as possible.
