= Sullivant Township, Illinois =

Township in Illinois, US

Sullivant Township
- Township
- Location in Ford County

- Ford County's location in Illinois
- Coordinates: 40°34′31″N 88°23′02″W
- Country: United States
- State: Illinois
- County: Ford
- Established: September 9, 1867

Area
  - Total: 47.39 sq mi (122.7 km^{2})
  - Land: 47.28 sq mi (122.5 km^{2})
  - Water: 0.11 sq mi (0.28 km^{2}) 0.22%
- Elevation: 814 ft (248 m)

Population (2020)
  - Total: 479
  - Density: 10.1/sq mi (3.91/km^{2})
- Time zone: UTC-6 (CST)
  - Summer (DST): UTC-5 (CDT)
- ZIP codes: 61720, 61731, 61773
- FIPS code: 17-053-73521

Sullivant Township is one of twelve townships in Ford County, Illinois, USA. As of the 2020 census, its population was 479 and it contained 231 housing units.

== History ==
The township was formed from Dix Township on September 9, 1867. It is named for Michael L. Sullivant, who in the 1860s was reputedly "the world's most successful farmer." Sullivant owned 80,000 acres (324 km^{2}) in Champaign, Ford, Piatt, and Livingston counties and used his land to raise corn and to graze large herds of cattle; he was one of a select group of wealthy men who dominated the state's booming livestock industry in the middle to late 19th century. An 1876 map of Ford County by Warner and Beers of the Union Atlas Co. shows Sullivant owning 42,000 acres (170 km^{2}) in Ford County, including all of Sullivant Township.

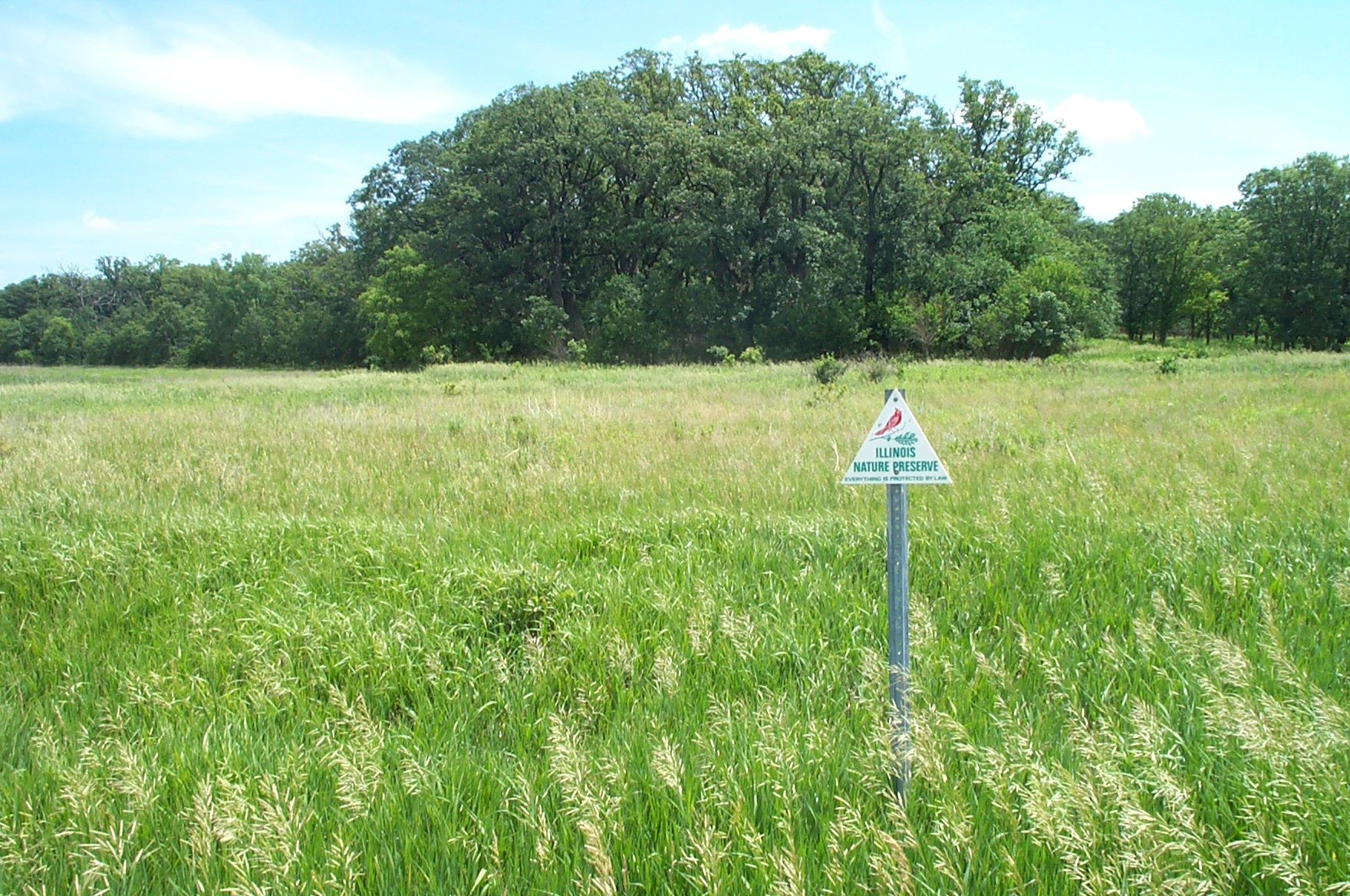
A small sign in front of the Sibley Grove Nature Preserve located on the border of section 35 and 26 in Sullivant township.

== Geography ==
According to the 2021 census gazetteer files, Sullivant Township has a total area of 47.39 square miles (122.74 km^{2}), of which 47.28 square miles (122.45 km^{2}) (or 99.78%) is land and 0.11 square miles (0.28 km^{2}) (or 0.22%) is water. The township is the headwaters of four major Illinois rivers - Sangamon, Mackinaw, Vermillion North, and Vermillion South.

=== Cities, towns, villages ===
- Sibley

=== Cemeteries ===
The township contains Mount Hope Cemetery.

=== Major highways ===
- Illinois Route 47

== Demographics ==
As of the 2020 census there were 479 people, 167 households, and 91 families residing in the township. The population density was 10.11 inhabitants per square mile (3.90/km^{2}). There were 231 housing units at an average density of 4.87 per square mile (1.88/km^{2}). The racial makeup of the township was 91.65% White, 0.42% African American, 0.42% Native American, 0.21% Asian, 0.00% Pacific Islander, 1.67% from other races, and 5.64% from two or more races. Hispanic or Latino of any race were 2.71% of the population.

There were 167 households, out of which 16.20% had children under the age of 18 living with them, 44.31% were married couples living together, 3.59% had a female householder with no spouse present, and 45.51% were non-families. 37.10% of all households were made up of individuals, and 13.20% had someone living alone who was 65 years of age or older. The average household size was 2.03 and the average family size was 2.76.

The township's age distribution consisted of 19.5% under the age of 18, 8.6% from 18 to 24, 15.7% from 25 to 44, 28.6% from 45 to 64, and 27.7% who were 65 years of age or older. The median age was 48.6 years. For every 100 females, there were 118.7 males. For every 100 females age 18 and over, there were 115.0 males.

The median income for a household in the township was $58,125, and the median income for a family was $78,661. Males had a median income of $52,560 versus $30,833 for females. The per capita income for the township was $28,712. About 5.5% of families and 12.1% of the population were below the poverty line, including 12.3% of those under age 18 and 14.9% of those age 65 or over.

Historical population
Census	Pop.	Note	%±
2000	605		—
2010	510		−15.7%
2020	479		−6.1%
U.S. Decennial Census

== School districts ==
- Gibson City-Melvin-Sibley Community Unit School District 5
- Prairie Central Community Unit School District 8

== Political districts ==
- Illinois' 16th congressional district
- State House District 105
- State Senate District 53
