= Anchor Township, McLean County, Illinois =

Coordinates: 40°31′19″N 88°31′33″W

Anchor Township
- Township
- Location in McLean County

- McLean County's location in Illinois
- Country: United States
- State: Illinois
- County: McLean
- Established: Before 1920

Area
  - Total: 36.53 sq mi (94.6 km^{2})
  - Land: 36.53 sq mi (94.6 km^{2})
  - Water: 0 sq mi (0 km^{2}) 0%

Population (2010)
  - Estimate (2016): 282
  - Density: 7.8/sq mi (3.0/km^{2})
- Time zone: UTC-6 (CST)
  - Summer (DST): UTC-5 (CDT)
- FIPS code: 17-113-01374

Anchor Township is located in McLean County, Illinois. As of the 2010 census, its population was 286 and it contained 139 housing units. Anchor Township formed from Cropsey Township in 1877. The township's name most likely is derived from the hymn "My Soul Is Anchored in the Cross".

== Geography ==
Anchor Township is located in eastern McLean County. The village of Anchor lies within the township and takes its name from it.

According to the 2010 census, the township has a total area of 36.53 square miles (94.6 km^{2}), all land.

== Demographics ==
Historical population
Census	Pop.	Note	%±
2016 (est.)	282
U.S. Decennial Census
