= Condit Township, Champaign County, Illinois =

Condit Township
- Township
- Location in Champaign County

- Champaign County's location in Illinois
- Coordinates: 40°16′27″N 88°17′56″W
- Country: United States
- State: Illinois
- County: Champaign
- Established: May 8, 1867

Area
  - Total: 36.48 sq mi (94.5 km^{2})
  - Land: 36.43 sq mi (94.4 km^{2})
  - Water: 0.04 sq mi (0.10 km^{2}) 0.11%
- Elevation: 725 ft (221 m)

Population (2020)
  - Total: 486
  - Density: 13.3/sq mi (5.15/km^{2})
- Time zone: UTC-6 (CST)
  - Summer (DST): UTC-5 (CDT)
- FIPS code: 17-019-16080

Condit Township is a township in Champaign County, Illinois, USA. As of the 2020 census, its population was 486 and contained 206 housing units.

== History ==
Condit Township formed from the eastern half of Newcomb Township on May 8, 1867. It was named after Albert Barton Condit, who was the first to represent the township in the county’s Board of Supervisors. An early post office in northwest Condit Township, near Fisher, was called Newcomb.

== Geography ==
Condit is coterminous with Congressional township 21 North, Range 8 East of the Third Principal Meridian.

According to the 2010 census, the township has a total area of 36.48 square miles (94.5 km^{2}), of which 36.43 square miles (94.4 km^{2}) (or 99.86%) is land and 0.04 square miles (0.10 km^{2}) (or 0.14%) is water. The Sangamon River flows through the northwest corner of the township.

=== Cities and towns ===
- Fisher (southeast edge)

=== Cemeteries ===
The township contains three cemeteries: Jersey (Section 28), Knife or Pusey (Section 19), and Willowbrook in Fisher (Section 6).

== Demographics ==
As of the 2020 census there were 486 people, 185 households, and 153 families residing in the township. The population density was 13.32 inhabitants per square mile (5.14/km^{2}). There were 206 housing units at an average density of 5.65 per square mile (2.18/km^{2}). The racial makeup of the township was 94.24% White, 0.41% African American, 0.00% Native American, 0.62% Asian, 0.21% Pacific Islander, 1.03% from other races, and 3.50% from two or more races. Hispanic or Latino of any race were 2.47% of the population.

There were 185 households, out of which 9.20% had children under the age of 18 living with them, 77.84% were married couples living together, 4.86% had a female householder with no spouse present, and 17.30% were non-families. 17.30% of all households were made up of individuals, and none had someone living alone who was 65 years of age or older. The average household size was 2.45 and the average family size was 2.69.

The township's age distribution consisted of 9.7% under the age of 18, 4.2% from 18 to 24, 16.7% from 25 to 44, 39.3% from 45 to 64, and 30.0% who were 65 years of age or older. The median age was 58.0 years. For every 100 females, there were 105.0 males. For every 100 females age 18 and over, there were 107.6 males.

The median income for a household in the township was $82,875, and the median income for a family was $85,250. Males had a median income of $43,750 versus $33,000 for females. The per capita income for the township was $51,985. No families and 2.2% of the population were below the poverty line.

Historical population
Census	Pop.	Note	%±
1860	355		—
1870	755		112.7%
1880	822		8.9%
1890	750		−8.8%
1900	777		3.6%
1910	689		−11.3%
1920	649		−5.8%
1930	608		−6.3%
1940	556		−8.6%
2010	500		—
2020	486		−2.8%
U.S. Decennial Census
