= Muhammad: The Messenger of God =

Muhammad: The Messenger of God may refer to:

- Muhammad: The Messenger of God (book), by Betty Kelen about Muhammad and Islam
- Muhammad: The Messenger of God (film), a 2015 Iranian film by Majid Majidi about the childhood of Muhammad
  - Muhammad: The Messenger of God (soundtrack), a soundtrack album from the film by A. R. Rahman
- Mohammad, Messenger of God or The Message (1976 film), Islamic drama film by Moustapha Akkad about Muhammad

== See also ==
- Muhammad (disambiguation)
