= Anchor, Illinois =

- Village
- Location in McLean County, Illinois
- Coordinates: 40°34′05″N 88°32′18″W
- Country: United States
- State: Illinois
- County: McLean
- Township: Anchor

Area
  - Total: 0.17 sq mi (0.44 km^{2})
  - Land: 0.17 sq mi (0.44 km^{2})
  - Water: 0 sq mi (0.00 km^{2})
- Elevation: 774 ft (236 m)

Population (2020)
  - Total: 163
  - Density: 954.3/sq mi (368.44/km^{2})
- Time zone: UTC-6 (CST)
  - Summer (DST): UTC-5 (CDT)
- ZIP code: 61720
- Area code: 309
- FIPS code: 17-01361
- GNIS ID: 2397959

Anchor is a village in McLean County, Illinois, United States. The population was 163 at the 2020 census. It is part of the Bloomington–Normal Metropolitan Statistical Area.

== History ==
Anchor was laid out on April 28, 1880, by Daniel B. Stewart (1837 – 1920). Stewart was a large landowner in the area. He was born in New York and had come to Illinois in the early 1860s. With others Stewart donated $10,000 to build ten miles of the railroad. The town was created when the Clinton Bloomington and Northeastern Railroad was built. Colfax, Cropsey and Cooksville were laid out at the same time. This railroad was soon absorbed by the Illinois Central. The first trains passed through the town on July 4, 1880. The town takes its name from Anchor Township; early McLean County historians wrote that they did not know the source of the name Anchor.

The original town of Anchor was a rectangle extending on both sides of a diagonal track with no widening of the track as was commonly found at such towns. A small triangular block north of the railroad was designated as Depot Park. The depot itself was on the north side of the tracks, and the two elevators were on the south side. Most of the early commercial buildings were on the north side of Second Street, which was north of the tracks. By 1895 there was a brickyard on the southwest edge of the town and next to it was a coal shaft, but it is not clear if the shaft was ever finished. There were also a handful of stores and the Morris Hotel.

== Geography ==
Anchor is in eastern McLean County, south of Illinois Route 165. Bloomington, the county seat, is 28 miles (45 km) to the west, and Sibley is 9 miles (14 km) to the east in Ford County.

According to the U.S. Census Bureau, Anchor has a total area of 0.17 square miles (0.44 km^{2}), all land. The village drains south toward the Mackinaw River, a west-flowing tributary of the Illinois River.

== Demographics ==
Historical population
| Census | Pop. | Note | %± |
|---|---|---|---|
| 1880 | 32 | | — |
| 1960 | 194 | | — |
| 1970 | 200 | | 3.1% |
| 1980 | 192 | | −4.0% |
| 1990 | 178 | | −7.3% |
| 2000 | 175 | | −1.7% |
| 2010 | 146 | | −16.6% |
| 2020 | 163 | | 11.6% |
Decennial US Census

As of the census of 2000, there were 175 people, 65 households, and 47 families residing in the village. The population density was 904.5 inhabitants per square mile (349.2/km^{2}). There were 68 housing units at an average density of 351.5 per square mile (135.7/km^{2}). The racial makeup of the village was 97.14% White, 0.57% Native American, and 2.29% from two or more races.

There were 65 households, out of which 33.8% had children under the age of 18 living with them, 67.7% were married couples living together, 4.6% had a female householder with no husband present, and 26.2% were non-families. 23.1% of all households were made up of individuals, and 16.9% had someone living alone who was 65 years of age or older. The average household size was 2.69 and the average family size was 3.17.

In the village, the population was spread out, with 32.0% under the age of 18, 3.4% from 18 to 24, 26.3% from 25 to 44, 16.0% from 45 to 64, and 22.3% who were 65 years of age or older. The median age was 39 years. For every 100 females, there were 88.2 males. For every 100 females age 18 and over, there were 83.1 males.

The median income for a household in the village was $50,250, and the median income for a family was $52,813. Males had a median income of $36,607 versus $28,750 for females. The per capita income for the village was $17,642. None of the families and 1.9% of the population were living below the poverty line.
