= Cropsey, Illinois =

- Unincorporated community
- Location within Illinois Location within the United States
- Coordinates: 40°36′33″N 88°28′43″W
- Country: United States
- State: Illinois
- County: McLean
- Elevation: 797 ft (243 m)
- Time zone: UTC-6 (Central (CST))
  - Summer (DST): UTC-5 (CDT)
- ZIP code: 61731
- Area code: 309
- GNIS feature ID: 406824

Cropsey is an unincorporated community in McLean County, Illinois, United States. It was named for a Civil War colonel in the Union Army.

== History ==
=== Founding of Cropsey ===
Cropsey was laid out 8 October 1880 by Henry L. Terpening (13 April 1836 – 11 August 1919). and Ira C. Pratt (12 January 1832 – 14 April 1917). Pratt was a native of Vermont who had been trained as a blacksmith and Wagon-maker. He came to Illinois in 1855, settling first at Morton in Tazewell County. In 1867 he purchased land in Belle Prairie Township, Livingston County, just north of Cropsey. In 1882 he began buying tile to drain his farmland and then decided to manufacture his own tile in Cropsey. In 1883 he built a large house on the west side of the town of Cropsey. Terpening, whose name was sometimes spelled, Henry L. Terpenning, was a native of New York who had been a farmer in Cropsey Township. He was a justice of the peace and represented McLean County in the Illinois State Legislature in the 36th and 37th general assemblies during the early 1890s. About 1892 he moved to Vermilion County. Before the town of Cropsey was established, there had been several efforts to attract a railroad to Cropsey Township. In October 1869 the township had voted $60,000 in bonds, with an additional $15,000 to be added if a station was established in the township. The money was to have helped finance the Decatur and East St. Louis Railroad. This effort failed. This railroad passed north of the township. A second chance came in 1880 with the Clinton, Bloomington and Northeastern Railroad. A number of local people donated money and land to attract the railroad to Cropsey Township. The town of Cropsey was laid out at the same time as other new towns on this railroad including Anchor, Colfax, and Cooksville. The first trains from Kankakee came on 4 July 1880, but it was another two years before tracks were completed to Bloomington. This railroad soon became part of the Illinois Central system. Cropsey Township, from which the new town took its name, was named in honor of Andrew J. Cropsey who was a Civil War officer member of the Illinois Legislature in the 1860s.

=== Design and Development of Cropsey ===
The original town of Cropsey had only about fifty lots. Southeast of the diagonal railroad was an enlarged railroad ground where its normal one hundred foot right-of-way was extended an additional seventy-five feet in width. On this side, Main Street ran parallel to the tracks with eleven lots facing the street. The depot and one grain elevator were northwest of the tracks and the early stockyard and another elevator southeast. Other lots were scattered along Yates Street, Locust Street, East Street, and Belle Prairie Street. By 1895 only a few businesses had settled in the town. Seth R. Alford operated the Alford House Hotel and also dealt in livery and feed. H. L. Barns ran a bank, served as notary public, and also dealt in livestock and grain. E. W. Crum had a blacksmith and wheelwright shop and sold drain tile. There were two other stores. Meeker brothers handled groceries, dry goods and hardware. L. W. Alford and Brother sold dry goods, notions, hats, caps, boots, shoes and queensware; they also repaired harnesses. Most of these businesses faced Main Street Since that time Cropsey has remained a very small place.

== Notable people ==
- Gene Brucker, Renaissance historian
- Lloyd Loar, classical mandolinist
