= Morris Bridge =

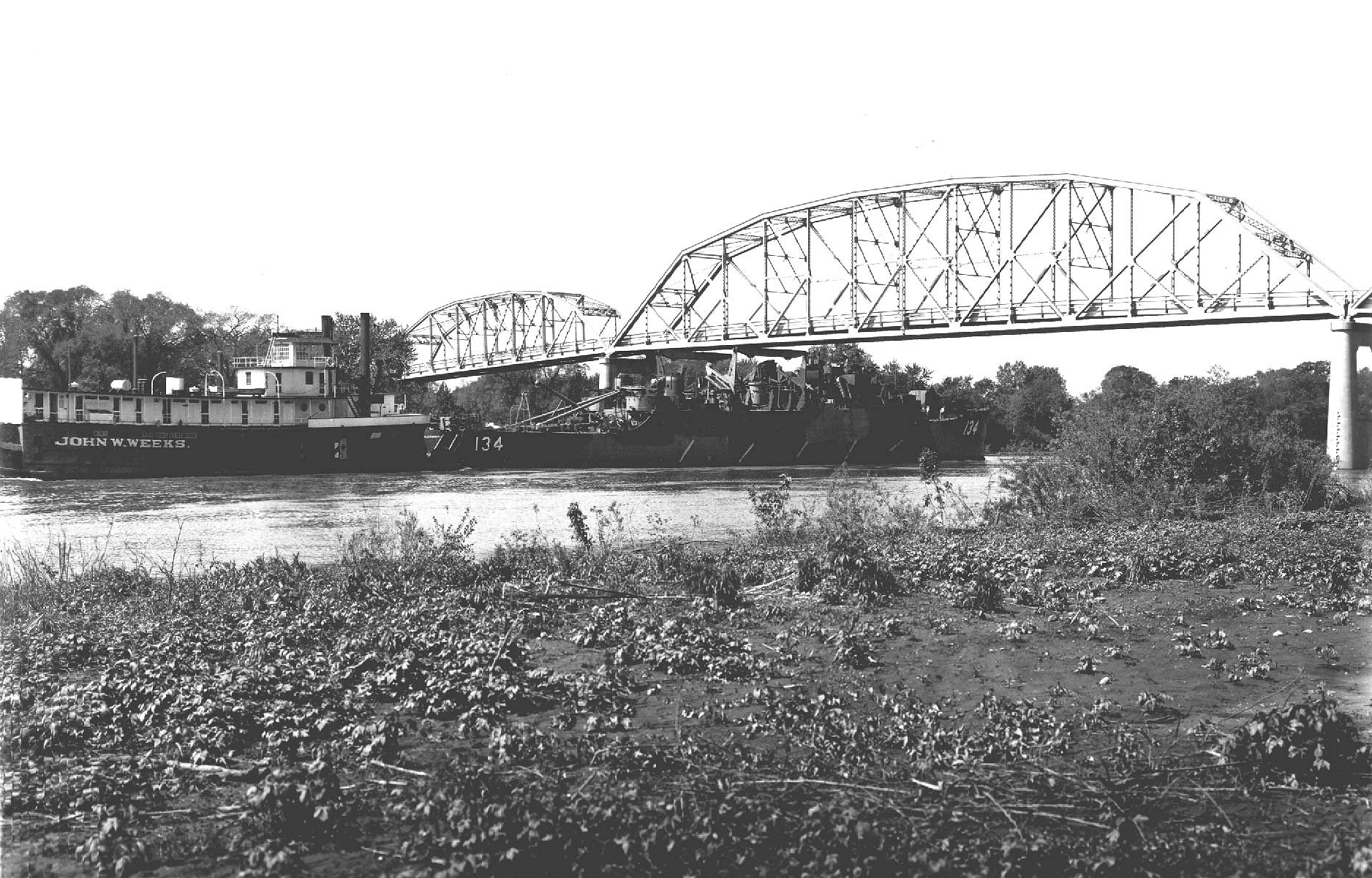
- The old Morris Bridge, in May 1945
- Coordinates: 41°21′14″N 88°25′17″W
- Carries: 4 lanes of Illinois Route 47
- Crosses: Illinois River
- Locale: Morris, Illinois
- Official name: Morris Bridge
- Maintained by: Illinois Department of Transportation
- ID number: 000032009935856

Characteristics
- Design: Steel Girder Concrete Deck
- Width: 4 traffic lanes, 61 feet (about 19.9 meters)

History
- Construction end: November 2002
- Opened: November 2002

Location
- Interactive map of Morris Bridge

The Morris Bridge is a bridge over the Illinois River completed in late 2002, replacing an older bridge built in 1934.
