= Mohammad Khan Tang-e Sepu =

Mohammad Khan Tang-e Sepu محمدخان تنگ سپو
- Village
- Location within Iran
- Coordinates: 30°51′04″N 50°41′44″E
- Country: Iran
- Province: Kohgiluyeh and Boyer-Ahmad
- County: Kohgiluyeh
- Bakhsh: Central
- Rural District: Dehdasht-e Sharqi

Population (2006)
  - Total: 107
- Time zone: UTC+3:30 (IRST)
  - Summer (DST): UTC+4:30 (IRDT)

Mohammad Khan Tang-e Sepu (Persian: محمدخان تنگ سپو, also Romanized as Moḩammad Khān Tang-e Sepū; also known as Moḩammad) is a village in Dehdasht-e Sharqi Rural District, in the Central District of Kohgiluyeh County, Kohgiluyeh and Boyer-Ahmad Province, Iran. At the 2006 census, its population was 107, in 21 families.
