= Gholam Mohammad Bazar =

Gholam Mohammad Bazar غلام محمد بازار
- Village
- Location within Iran
- Coordinates: 25°34′29″N 61°09′29″E
- Country: Iran
- Province: Sistan and Baluchestan
- County: Chabahar
- Bakhsh: Central
- Rural District: Pir Sohrab

Population (2006)
  - Total: 233
- Time zone: UTC+3:30 (IRST)
  - Summer (DST): UTC+4:30 (IRDT)

Gholam Mohammad Bazar (Persian: غلام محمد بازار, also Romanized as Gholām Moḩammad Bāzār; also known as Moḩammad and Muhammad) is a village in Pir Sohrab Rural District, in the Central District of Chabahar County, Sistan and Baluchestan Province, Iran. At the 2006 census, its population was 233, in 36 families.
