= Hazen Bridge =

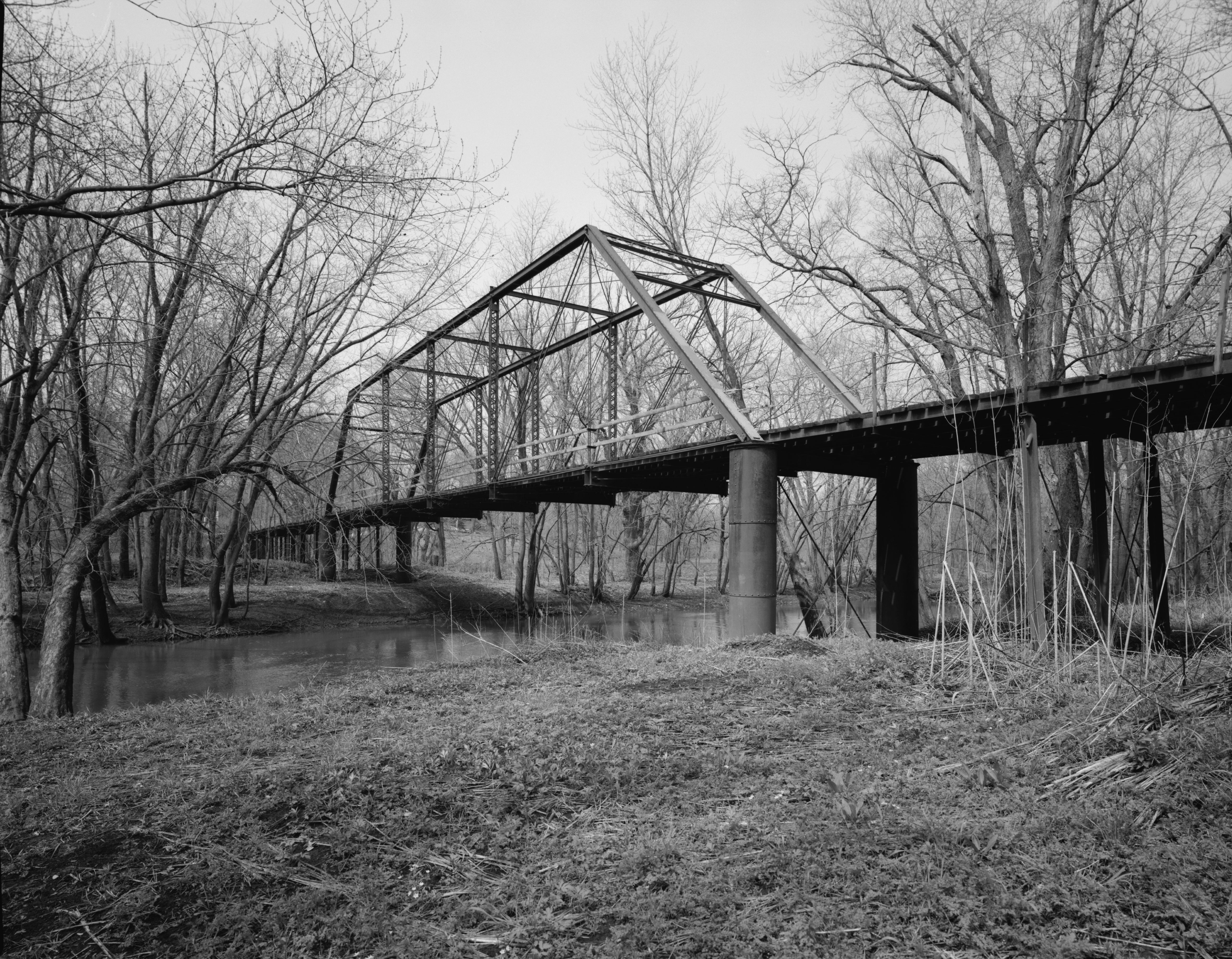
- Coordinates: 40°15′10″N 88°23′0″W
- Carries: Pedestrian and bicycle; formerly a single vehicle roadway Newcomb Township road 85
- Crosses: Sangamon River
- Locale: Mahomet, Illinois
- Maintained by: Newcomb Township
- ID number: 010-3103

Characteristics
- Design: 16 spans, main span is a Pratt through truss span
- Width: 13 feet 7 inches
- Longest span: 120 feet (channel span)
- Clearance above: 14 feet

History
- Opened: 1893

Location
- Interactive map of Hazen Bridge

The Hazen Bridge, also known as the Newcomb Bridge, is a steel bridge spanning the Sangamon River north of Mahomet in Champaign County, Illinois, in the United States. It was constructed at a location known as White's ford, a popular crossing location of that era because of its proximity to Mahomet and Shiloh Church. The bridge was built in 1893 by Seevers Manufacturing Company of Oskaloosa, Iowa for the bid of $4,985. The name is derived from the Hazen family which owned property adjacent to the crossing. It was added to the National Register of Historic Places in 1994 as structure #94000433.
