= Illinois Route 47 =

North-south state highway in Illinois, US

Illinois Route 47
- IL 47 highlighted in red

Route information
- Maintained by IDOT
- Length: 169.76 mi (273.20 km)
- Existed: 1924–present

Major junctions
- South end: IL 10 in Seymour
- I-72 in Seymour; I-74 in Mahomet; I-55 in Dwight; I-80 in Morris I-88 Toll / IL 110 (CKC) in Sugar Grove I-90 Toll in Huntley
- North end: WIS 120 in Hebron

Location
- Country: United States
- State: Illinois
- Counties: Champaign, Ford, Livingston, Grundy, Kendall, Kane, McHenry

Highway system
- Illinois State Highway System; Interstate; US; State; Tollways; Scenic
← US 45	→ IL 48

Illinois Route 47 (IL 47) is a 169.76-mile-long (273.20 km) largely rural north–south state highway that runs from the Wisconsin state border at Highway 120 near Hebron, to IL 10, just south of Interstate 72 (I-72) near Seymour. IL 47 is in primarily rural areas but in several suburbs of Chicago, such as Woodstock and Huntley, traffic can be heavily congested.

IL 47 crosses most interstate highways in northern and central Illinois, but the largest towns that it serves are Woodstock (at US 14), Huntley (at I-90), Pingree Grove (at US 20) Lily Lake at (IL 64), Elburn (at IL 38), Sugar Grove (at I-88/US 30), Yorkville (at US 34), Morris (at I-80/US 6), Dwight (at I-55), Forrest (at US 24), Gibson City (at IL 9 / IL 54), Fisher (at US 136) Mahomet (at I-74/US 150), and Seymour (at I-72).

== Route description ==
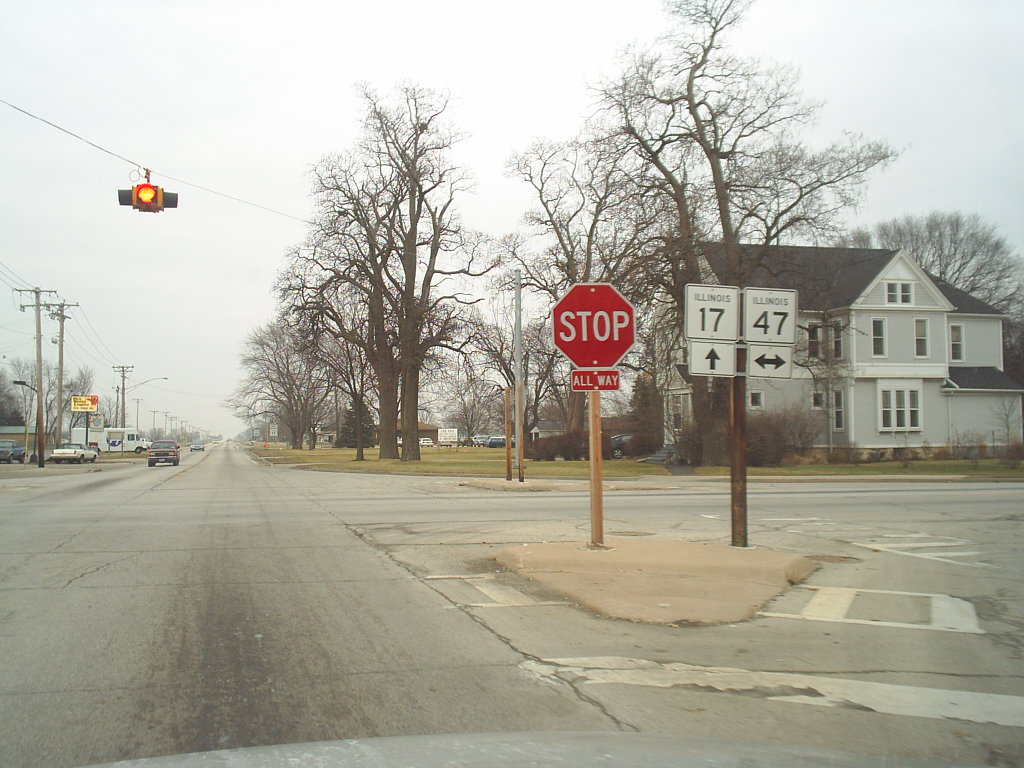
IL 17/IL 47 intersection in Dwight

Illinois 47 overlaps Illinois Route 72 and U.S. Route 20 at Pingree Grove, a village approximately 60 miles (97 km) from Chicago; this concurrency is part of a so-called wrong-way concurrency, where one can be driving both “south” on Illinois 72 and “north” on U.S. 20 at the same time. Route 47 also shares concurrencies with Illinois Route 9 and Illinois 54 in Gibson City, U.S. Route 30 in Sugar Grove, U.S. Route 6 in Morris, Historic U.S. Route 66 in Dwight, and U.S. Route 150 in Mahomet.

== History ==
The original route ended near where it ends today, however, in 1937, it was extended to Decatur via portions of modern day IL 10 and IL 105. Only eight years later (in 1945), the segment between Monticello and Decatur was rerouted (the old route became IL 105). One final change came by 1980 when IL 47 was moved back to its current southern terminus at IL 10 after I-72 was built in the area.

Widenings started occurring further north as early as 2009. A project to reconstruct the road to 4 lanes from Kreutzer Road to Reed Road through Huntley was completed in October 2011, including completing all ramps at the I-90 interchange. IL 47 was widened from I-80 in Morris to Caton Farm Road south of Yorkville as part of the Prairie Parkway study–work was completed in 2015. In 2015, the project to expand the section between IL 71 and Kennedy Road in Yorkville to 4-lanes was completed. The partial interchange with I-88 between Sugar Grove and Elburn was made full with the completion of the missing ramps (using electronic toll collection) in 2019.

== Future ==
The Illinois Department of Transportation is proposing to add lanes to several portions of Illinois Route 47, which eventually would make it a 4-lane road from I-80 in Morris to I-88 in Sugar Grove, and from I-90 in Huntley to north of Woodstock.

== Major intersections ==
County	Location	mi	km	Destinations	Notes
Champaign	Seymour	0.0	0.0	IL 10 – Champaign, Seymour	
Champaign	Seymour	0.5	0.80	I-72 – Decatur, Champaign	I-72 exit 176
Champaign	Mahomet	5.4	8.7	US 150 west (Oak Street) – Farmer City	Southern end of US 150 concurrency
Champaign	Mahomet	5.8	9.3	US 150 east (Oak Street) – Champaign	Northern end of US 150 concurrency
Champaign	Mahomet	6.3	10.1	I-74 – Bloomington, Champaign	I-74 exit 172
Champaign	Fisher	14.3	23.0	US 136 – Bloomington, Havana, Fisher	
Ford	Gibson City	24.6	39.6	IL 9 east / IL 54 east (1st Street) – Paxton, Onarga	Southern end of IL 9/IL 54 concurrency
Ford	Gibson City	25.1	40.4	IL 54 west – Farmer City	Northern end of IL 54 concurrency
Ford	Gibson City	25.7	41.4	IL 9 west – Bloomington	Northern end of IL 9 concurrency
Ford	Sibley	34.3	55.2	IL 165 west – Anchor, Colfax	
Livingston	Forrest	45.7	73.5	US 24 (Wabash Avenue) – Chenoa, Gilman	
Livingston	Saunemin	55.5	89.3	IL 116 (Main Street) – Pontiac, Saunemin	
Livingston	Dwight	69.6	112.0	IL 17 (Mazon Avenue) – Wenona, Kankakee, Business District	
Livingston	Dwight	69.9	112.5	Historic US 66 west (McNamara Avenue)	Southern end of Historic US 66 concurrency
Livingston	Dwight	70.4	113.3	Historic US 66 east (Dwight Road)	Northern end of Historic US 66 concurrency
Grundy	Dwight	71.3	114.7	I-55 – Bloomington, Joliet	I-55 exit 220
Grundy	Mazon	82.9	133.4	IL 113 east – Coal City	
Grundy	Morris	87.7	141.1	Morris Bridge over Illinois River	
Grundy	Morris	89.0	143.2	US 6 west (Bedford Road) – Ottawa	Southern end of US 6 concurrency
Grundy	Morris	89.7	144.4	US 6 east – Channahon	Northern end of US 6 concurrency
Grundy	Morris	90.1	145.0	I-80 – Moline, Rock Island, Joliet	I-80 exit 112
Kendall	Lisbon	98.6	158.7	US 52 – Mendota, Joliet	
Kendall	Yorkville	106.5	171.4	IL 71 (Stagecoach Trail, Cleng Peerson Memorial Highway) – Newark, Ottawa, Oswego	
Kendall	Yorkville	107.5	173.0	IL 126 east (Schoolhouse Road) – Plainfield	
Kendall	Yorkville	109.1	175.6	US 34 (Veterans Parkway, Walter Payton Memorial Highway) – Plano, Oswego	
Kendall–Kane county line	Aurora–Sugar Grove city line	113.6	182.8	US 30 east (Baseline Road) – Montgomery, Joliet	Southern end of US 30 concurrency
Kane	Aurora–Sugar Grove city line	114.0	183.5	CR 24 (Jericho Road) – Aurora, Hinckley	
Kane	Sugar Grove	116.7	187.8	US 30 west / IL 56 east to I-88 Toll east – Hinckley, Chicago	Northern end of US 30 concurrency; interchange
Kane	Sugar Grove	117.6	189.3	CR 78 north (Bliss Road)	
Kane	Sugar Grove	119.0	191.5	CR 4 west (Harter Road) – Kaneville	
Kane	Sugar Grove	120.8	194.4	I-88 Toll / IL 110 (CKC) (Ronald Reagan Memorial Tollway) – Chicago, DeKalb	I-Pass only on ramps to I-88 east and from I-88 west; I-88 exit 109
Kane	Elburn	122.5	197.1	CR 10 (Main Street Road) – Batavia, Kaneville	
Kane	Elburn	125.0	201.2	CR 26 east (Hughes Road)	
Kane	Elburn	125.4	201.8	CR 41 / Lincoln Highway (Keslinger Road) – Geneva	
Kane	Elburn	126.9	204.2	IL 38 (Lincoln Highway) – DeKalb, Geneva	
Kane	Maple Park	128.5	206.8	CR 23 west (Beith Road)	
Kane	Lily Lake–St. Charles city line	129.5	208.4	IL 64 – Sycamore, St. Charles	
Kane	Lily Lake	130.1	209.4	CR 69 east (Empire Road)	
Kane	Campton Hills	133.1	214.2	CR 2 (Burlington Road)	Roundabout intersection
Kane	Pingree Grove	139.9	225.1	US 20 east / IL 72 west – Hampshire, Elgin	Southern end of US 20/IL 72 concurrency
Kane	Pingree Grove	140.4	226.0	US 20 west / IL 72 east (Higgins Road) – Marengo, West Dundee	Northern end of US 20/IL 72 concurrency
Kane	Huntley	143.3	230.6	I-90 Toll (Jane Addams Memorial Tollway) – Rockford, Chicago	I-Pass only; I-90 exit 47
McHenry	Lakewood	152.0	244.6	IL 176 east – Crystal Lake	Southern end of IL 176 concurrency
McHenry	Lakewood	152.7	245.7	IL 176 west – Marengo	Northern end of IL 176 concurrency
McHenry	Woodstock	155.5	250.3	US 14 (Northwest Highway, Ronald Reagan Highway) – Harvard, Crystal Lake	
McHenry	Woodstock	157.4	253.3	IL 120 (McHenry Avenue) – Gurnee	
McHenry	Hebron	168.1	270.5	IL 173 (Maple Avenue) – Harvard, Richmond	
McHenry	Hebron	169.76	273.20	WIS 120 north – Lake Geneva	Wisconsin state line
1.000 mi = 1.609 km; 1.000 km = 0.621 mi: Concurrency terminus; Electronic toll collection
