= Mohammad-e Olya =

Mohammad-e Olya محمدعليا
- Village
- Location within Iran
- Coordinates: 27°31′32″N 53°14′11″E
- Country: Iran
- Province: Fars
- County: Lamerd
- Bakhsh: Alamarvdasht
- Rural District: Kheyrgu

Population (2006)
  - Total: 160
- Time zone: UTC+3:30 (IRST)
  - Summer (DST): UTC+4:30 (IRDT)

Mohammad-e Olya (Persian: محمدعليا, also Romanized as Moḩammad-e 'Olyā; also known as Mollā’ī) is a village in Kheyrgu Rural District, Alamarvdasht District, Lamerd County, Fars province, Iran. At the 2006 census, its population was 160, in 33 families.
