= Martin Township, McLean County, Illinois =

Coordinates: 40°31′38″N 88°37′31″W

Martin Township
- Township
- Location in McLean County

- McLean County's location in Illinois
- Country: United States
- State: Illinois
- County: McLean
- Established: November 3, 1857

Area
  - Total: 36.24 sq mi (93.9 km^{2})
  - Land: 36.23 sq mi (93.8 km^{2})
  - Water: 0.01 sq mi (0.026 km^{2}) 0.03%

Population (2010)
  - Estimate (2016): 1,261
  - Density: 35.6/sq mi (13.7/km^{2})
- Time zone: UTC-6 (CST)
  - Summer (DST): UTC-5 (CDT)
- FIPS code: 17-113-47215

Martin Township is located in McLean County, Illinois. As of the 2010 census, its population was 1,289 and it contained 538 housing units.

== Geography ==
According to the 2010 census, the township has a total area of 36.24 square miles (93.9 km^{2}), of which 36.23 square miles (93.8 km^{2}) (or 99.97%) is land and 0.01 square miles (0.026 km^{2}) (or 0.03%) is water.

== Demographics ==
Historical population
Census	Pop.	Note	%±
2016 (est.)	1,261
U.S. Decennial Census
