= Seymour, Illinois =

Seymour
- Census-designated place
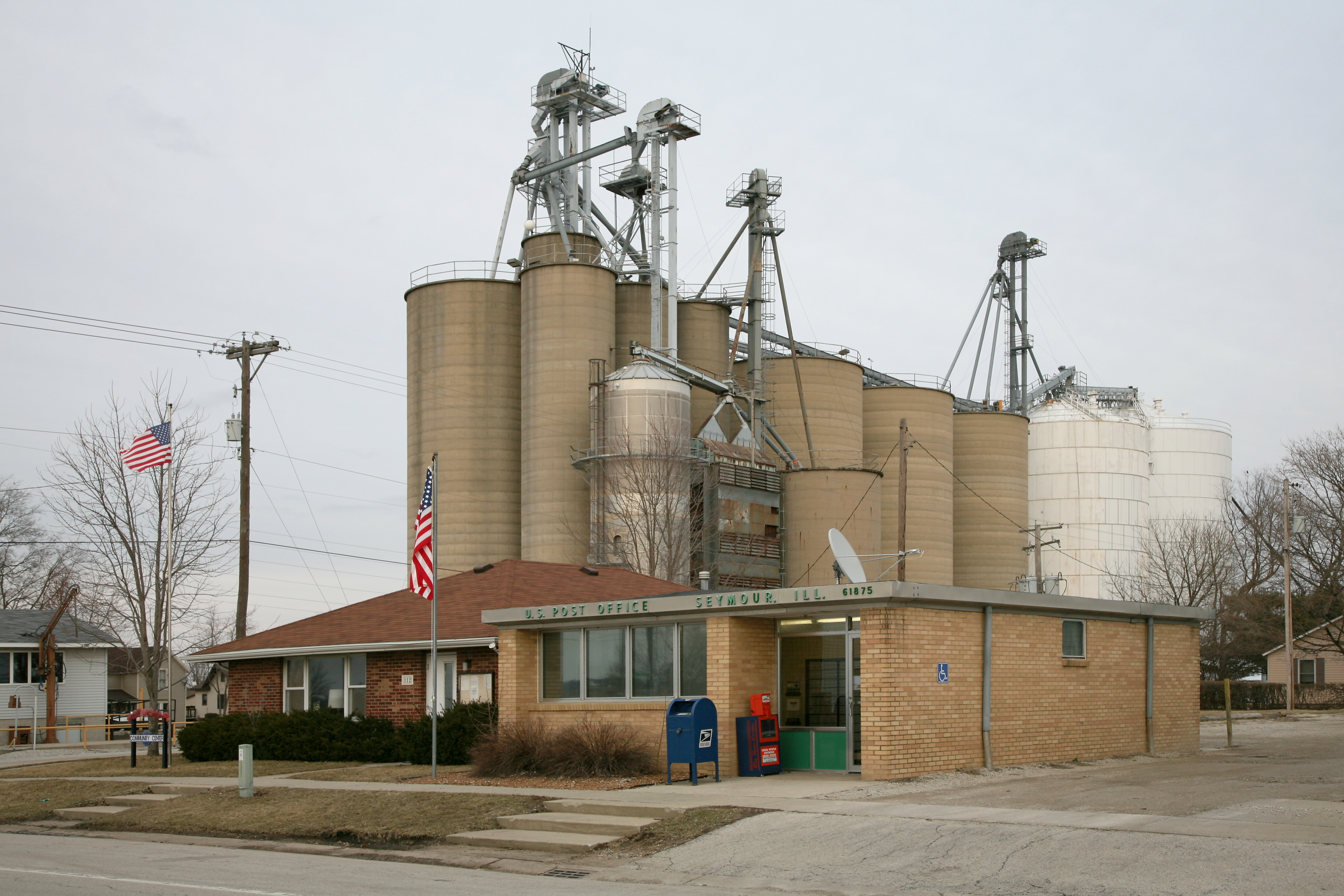
- Seymour, Illinois, post office and grain elevator

- Location within Illinois
- Coordinates: 40°06′25″N 88°25′37″W
- Country: United States
- State: Illinois
- County: Champaign
- Township: Scott

Area
  - Total: 0.26 sq mi (0.67 km^{2})
  - Land: 0.09 sq mi (0.23 km^{2})
  - Water: 0.00 sq mi (0 km^{2})
- Elevation: 699 ft (213 m)

Population (2020)
  - Total: 317
  - Density: 1,200/sq mi (470/km^{2})
- Time zone: UTC-6 (CST)
  - Summer (DST): UTC-5 (CDT)
- ZIP code: 61875
- Area code: 217
- FIPS code: 17-68809
- GNIS feature ID: 2628560

Seymour is a census-designated place in Champaign County, Illinois, United States. At the 2020 census, it had a population of 317. It is part of Mahomet-Seymour Community Unit School District No. 3.

== Geography ==
Seymour is located in Scott Township, Champaign County, Illinois. According to the 2021 census gazetteer files, Seymour has a total area of 0.09 square miles (0.23 km^{2}), all land.

== Demographics ==
Historical population
Census	Pop.	Note	%±
2010	303		—
2020	317		4.6%
U.S. Decennial Census

As of the 2020 census there were 317 people, 41 households, and 30 families residing in the CDP. The population density was 3,408.60 inhabitants per square mile (1,316.07/km^{2}). There were 122 housing units at an average density of 1,311.83 units per square mile (506.50 units/km^{2}). The racial makeup of the CDP was 93.38% White, 1.26% African American, 1.26% from other races, and 4.10% from two or more races. Hispanic or Latino of any race were 0.95% of the population.

There were 41 households, out of which 43.9% had children under the age of 18 living with them, 73.17% were married couples living together, none had a female householder with no husband present, and 26.83% were non-families. 26.83% of all households were made up of individuals, and none had someone living alone who was 65 years of age or older. The average household size was 4.07, and the average family size was 3.54.

The CDP's age distribution consisted of 18.6% under the age of 18, 17.9% from 18 to 24, 20% from 25 to 44, 35.8% from 45 to 64, and 7.6% who were 65 years of age or older. The median age was 40.3 years. For every 100 females, there were 61.1 males. For every 100 females age 18 and over, there were 59.5 males.

The median income for a household in the CDP was $105,893, and the median income for a family was $133,000. Males had a median income of $36,429 versus $42,143 for females. The per capita income for the CDP was $37,757. No families and 8.3% of the population were below the poverty line, including none of those under age 18 and 0.0% of those age 65 or over.

== Education ==
It is in the Mahomet-Seymour Community Unit School District 3.

== Notable person ==
- Jeff Pfeffer, was a Major League Baseball pitcher mostly for the Brooklyn Dodgers
