= Cropsey Township, McLean County, Illinois =

Coordinates: 40°35′33″N 88°30′52″W

Cropsey Township
- Township
- Location in McLean County

- McLean County's location in Illinois
- Country: United States
- State: Illinois
- County: McLean
- Established: November 3, 1857

Area
  - Total: 18.3 sq mi (47 km^{2})
  - Land: 18.3 sq mi (47 km^{2})
  - Water: 0 sq mi (0 km^{2}) 0%

Population (2020)
  - Total: 199
  - Density: 12.1/sq mi (4.7/km^{2})
- Time zone: UTC-6 (CST)
  - Summer (DST): UTC-5 (CDT)
- FIPS code: 17-113-17705

Cropsey Township is located in McLean County, Illinois. As of the 2020 census, its population was 199 and it contained 47 housing units. It was named after Col. A. J. Cropsey, the owner of a large farm in the area. In 1860 there were 25 families living in the township; by the 2000 census the total population was reported at 256.

== Geography ==
According to the 2010 census, the township has a total area of 18.3 square miles (47 km^{2}), all land.

== Demographics ==
Historical population
Census	Pop.	Note	%±
2020	199		—

According to the 2020 census there were 47 total households in the township. The median household income was $81,240, the percentage of people living in poverty was 0.0%.
