= Sibley, Illinois =

Sibley
- Village
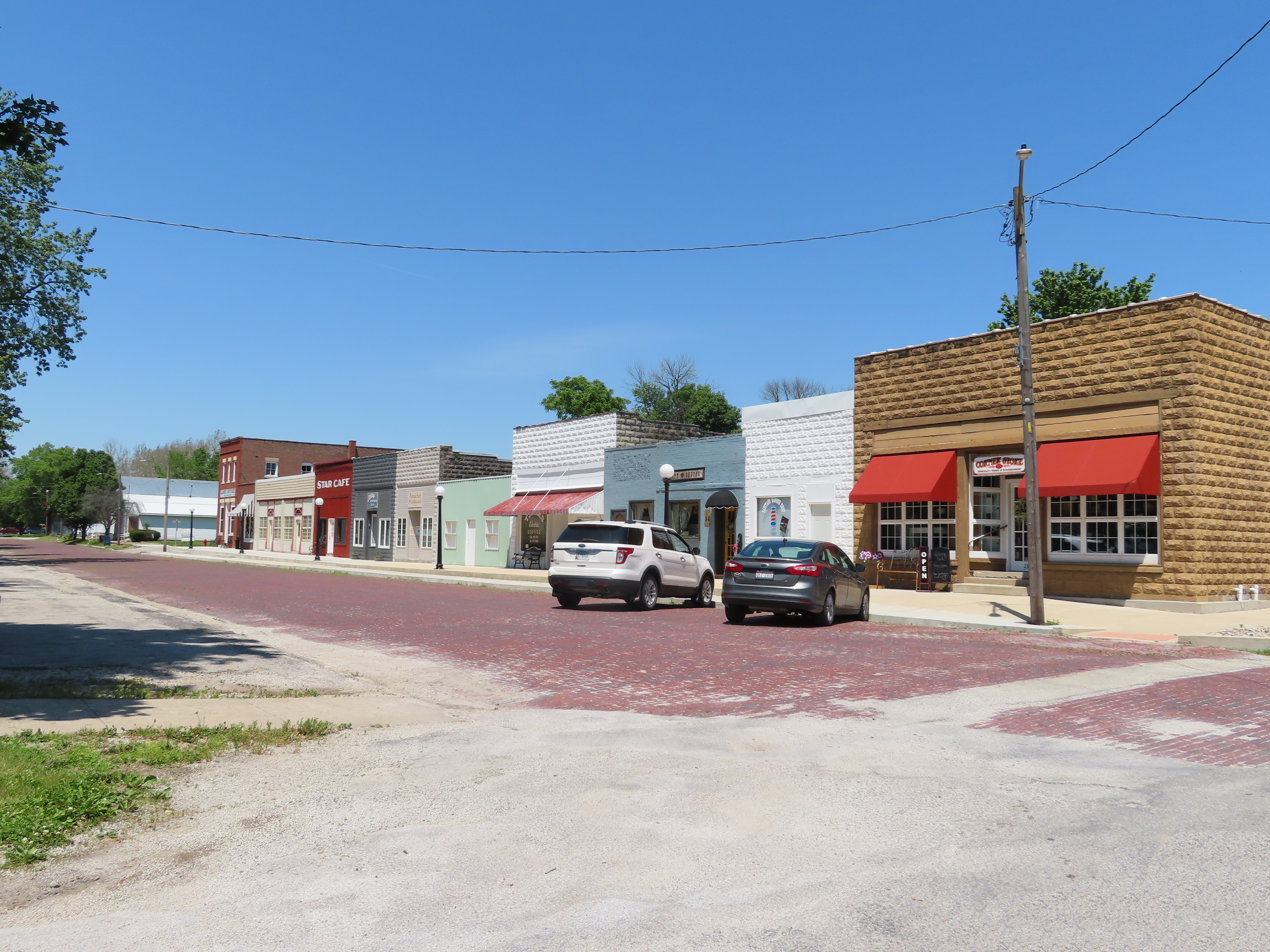
- Sciota Street in Sibley

- Location of Sibley in Ford County, Illinois.
- Coordinates: 40°35′15″N 88°22′33″W
- Country: United States
- State: Illinois
- County: Ford

Area
  - Total: 0.49 sq mi (1.28 km^{2})
  - Land: 0.48 sq mi (1.24 km^{2})
  - Water: 0.012 sq mi (0.03 km^{2})
- Elevation: 817 ft (249 m)

Population (2020)
  - Total: 288
  - Density: 599.3/sq mi (231.39/km^{2})
- Time zone: UTC-6 (CST)
  - Summer (DST): UTC-5 (CDT)
- ZIP code: 61773
- Area code: 217
- FIPS code: 17-69810
- GNIS feature ID: 2399817

Sibley is a village in Ford County, Illinois, United States. The population was 288 at the 2020 census.

== History ==
The site of Sibley was laid out for Michael L. Sullivant, the namesake of Sullivant Township, in 1877. Sullivant sold the land to Hiram Sibley in 1878. The post office was established in 1873 under the name Burr Oaks, but was renamed Sibley in 1880.

Sibley was once cited on Ripley's Believe It or Not! as the home of the largest corn crib in the World with a capacity of 125,000 bushels. However, it was demolished in 1965.

== Geography ==
According to the 2021 census gazetteer files, Sibley has a total area of 0.49 square miles (1.27 km^{2}), of which 0.48 square miles (1.24 km^{2}) (or 97.37%) is land and 0.01 square miles (0.03 km^{2}) (or 2.63%) is water.

== Demographics ==
Historical population
Census	Pop.	Note	%±
1890	404		—
1900	444		9.9%
1910	385		−13.3%
1920	383		−0.5%
1930	394		2.9%
1940	374		−5.1%
1950	345		−7.8%
1960	386		11.9%
1970	381		−1.3%
1980	370		−2.9%
1990	359		−3.0%
2000	329		−8.4%
2010	272		−17.3%
2020	288		5.9%
U.S. Decennial Census

As of the 2020 census there were 288 people, 111 households, and 58 families residing in the village. The population density was 583.00 inhabitants per square mile (225.10/km^{2}). There were 149 housing units at an average density of 301.62 per square mile (116.46/km^{2}). The racial makeup of the village was 89.24% White, 0.00% African American, 0.00% Native American, 0.00% Asian, 0.00% Pacific Islander, 2.43% from other races, and 8.33% from two or more races. Hispanic or Latino of any race were 2.08% of the population.

There were 111 households, out of which 19.8% had children under the age of 18 living with them, 45.95% were married couples living together, 5.41% had a female householder with no husband present, and 47.75% were non-families. 41.44% of all households were made up of individuals, and 19.82% had someone living alone who was 65 years of age or older. The average household size was 2.78 and the average family size was 2.01.

The village's age distribution consisted of 18.8% under the age of 18, 6.3% from 18 to 24, 14.8% from 25 to 44, 35% from 45 to 64, and 25.1% who were 65 years of age or older. The median age was 51.2 years. For every 100 females, there were 72.9 males. For every 100 females age 18 and over, there were 79.2 males.

The median income for a household in the village was $49,375, and the median income for a family was $70,500. Males had a median income of $49,250 versus $31,250 for females. The per capita income for the village was $27,225. About 8.6% of families and 14.0% of the population were below the poverty line, including 19.5% of those under age 18 and 12.5% of those age 65 or over.
