= Mahomet, Illinois =

- Village
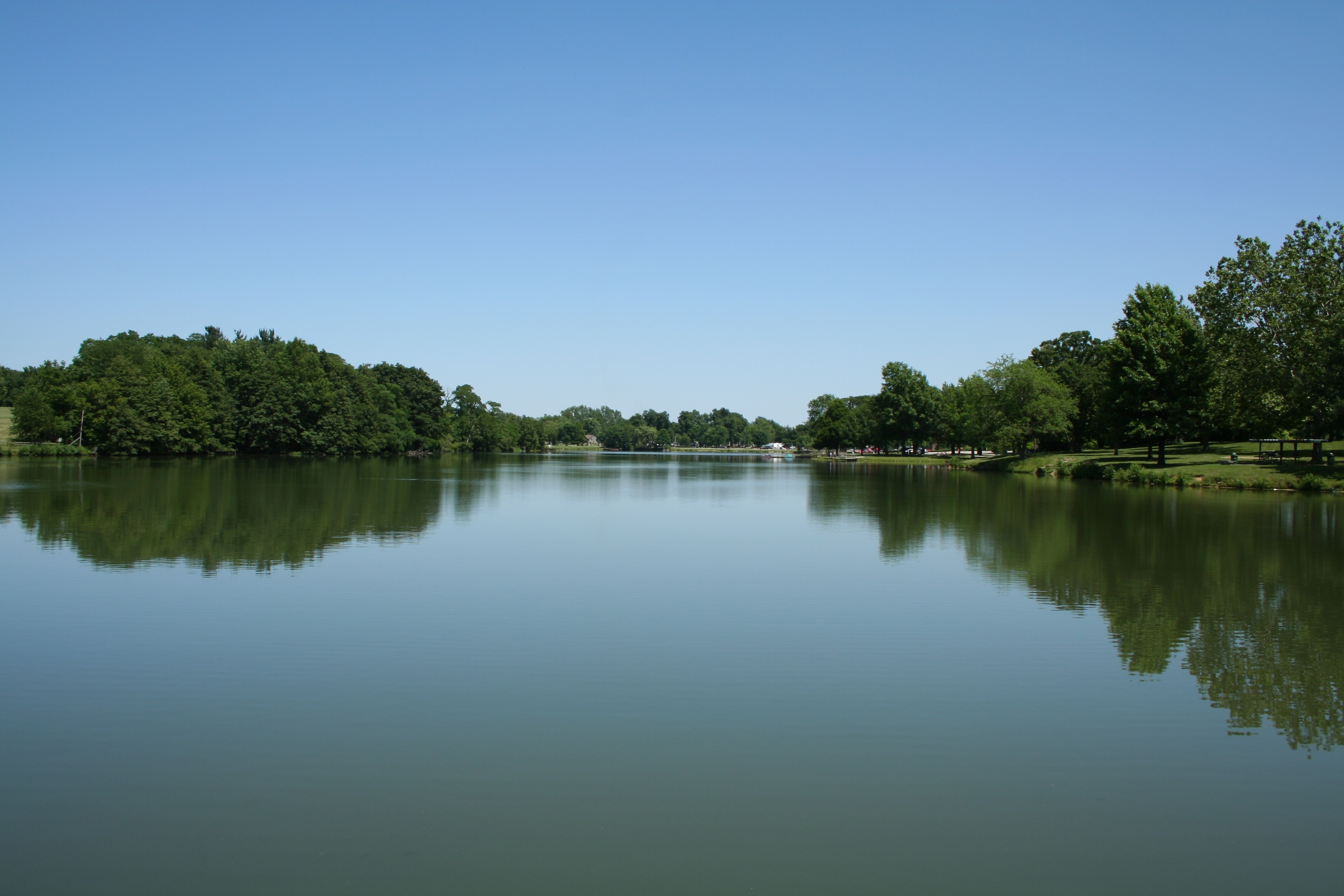
- Lake of the Woods

- Location of Mahomet in Champaign County, Illinois.

- Location within Champaign County Mahomet (Illinois)
- Coordinates: 40°11′12″N 88°22′32″W
- Country: United States
- State: Illinois
- County: Champaign

Government
  - Village President: Sean Widener

Area
  - Total: 9.79 sq mi (25.36 km^{2})
  - Land: 9.72 sq mi (25.18 km^{2})
  - Water: 0.069 sq mi (0.18 km^{2})
- Elevation: 732 ft (223 m)

Population (2020)
  - Total: 9,434
  - Density: 970.4/sq mi (374.67/km^{2})
- Time zone: UTC-6 (CST)
  - Summer (DST): UTC-5 (CDT)
- ZIP code: 61853
- Area code: 217
- FIPS code: 17-46136
- GNIS feature ID: 2399226
- Website: www.mahomet-il.gov

Mahomet (/məˈhɒmɛt/) is a village in Champaign County, Illinois, United States, along the Sangamon River. The population was 9,434 at the 2020 census. Mahomet is located approximately 10 miles (16 km) northwest of Champaign at the junction of Interstate 74 and Illinois Route 47.

== Etymology ==
The town's own published account credits its founder Daniel T. Porter, who had Connecticut roots, as the one who denominated both the new village as Middletown (after Middletown, Connecticut) and the post office as Mahomet (after Mahomet Weyonomon, a Mohegan sachem from Connecticut). With the arrival of the railroad, the town embraced the name of its post office in 1871 because there already was a Middletown, Illinois. However, alternative theories of the origin of the name "Mahomet" also exist. One derives the word from the "Mahomet Lodge", the local Masonic Lodge at the time the town was searching for a new name. Its use as the name of the lodge was a manifestation of the Freemasons' liberal use of religious names and stonemason tools and symbols. Local historian, Gregory Pasley, claims the Post Office held the name of "Mahomet" by 1838 and says this was before the Masonic Lodge was established in the village. Another theory stated that the town's name was arbitrarily assigned when the conflicting names were noted by the US Postal Service. Henry Gannett's book, The Origin of Certain Place Names in the United States, proposes Muhammad as the town's namesake.

== History ==
The village of Mahomet was first settled in 1832 on the banks of the Sangamon River. It was the first community to be established in modern-day Champaign County. The original village name was Middletown, possibly because it is half-way between the towns of Danville and Bloomington. In 1871, the name of the village was changed to Mahomet because there was already another Middletown in Illinois, which was causing mail problems. Most early settlers came from Ohio, Virginia, Kentucky, and Pennsylvania and chose to reside in Mahomet because there was abundant water from the Sangamon River and abundant trees. Currently, most residents commute around 10 miles (16 km) to the cities of Champaign and Urbana to work, although the village has a thriving small business district.

In 2007, the citizens of Mahomet voted to repeal the alcohol prohibition order that had been in place since World War II.

== Geography ==
According to the 2021 census gazetteer files, Mahomet has a total area of 9.79 square miles (25.36 km^{2}), of which 9.72 square miles (25.17 km^{2}) (or 99.29%) is land and 0.07 square miles (0.18 km^{2}) (or 0.71%) is water.

== Demographics ==
Historical population
Census	Pop.	Note	%±
1880	771		—
1890	473		−38.7%
1900	515		8.9%
1910	565		9.7%
1920	649		14.9%
1930	729		12.3%
1940	823		12.9%
1950	1,017		23.6%
1960	1,367		34.4%
1970	1,296		−5.2%
1980	1,986		53.2%
1990	3,103		56.2%
2000	4,877		57.2%
2010	7,258		48.8%
2020	9,434		30.0%
U.S. Decennial Census

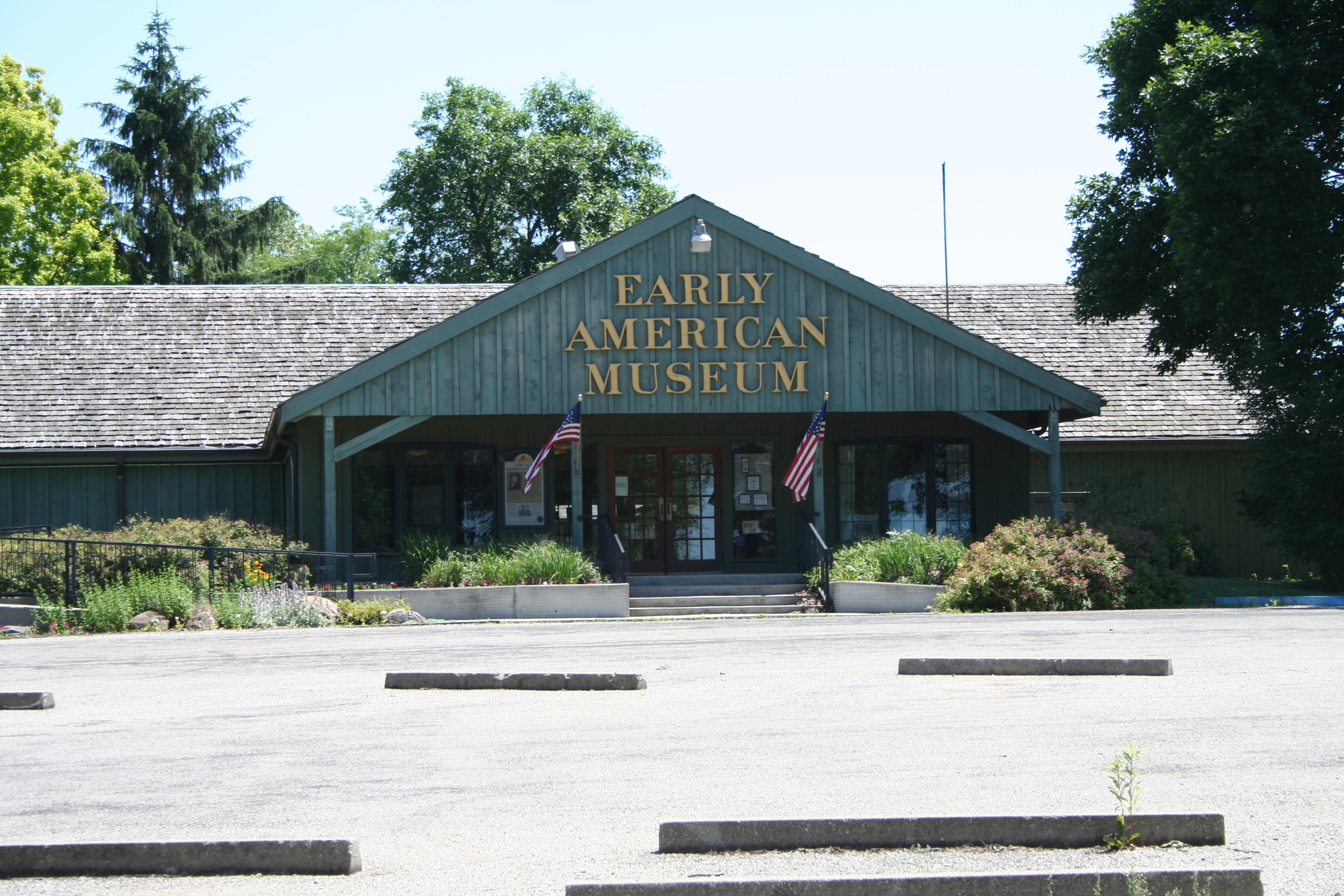
The Early American Museum at Lake of the Woods forest preserve.

=== 2020 census ===
As of the 2020 census, Mahomet had a population of 9,434 and 2,501 families residing in the village. The median age was 36.9 years. 31.0% of residents were under the age of 18 and 11.7% of residents were 65 years of age or older. For every 100 females there were 93.3 males, and for every 100 females age 18 and over there were 89.2 males age 18 and over.

95.0% of residents lived in urban areas, while 5.0% lived in rural areas.

There were 3,333 households in Mahomet, of which 45.4% had children under the age of 18 living in them. Of all households, 67.0% were married-couple households, 9.3% were households with a male householder and no spouse or partner present, and 19.5% were households with a female householder and no spouse or partner present. About 17.2% of all households were made up of individuals and 7.5% had someone living alone who was 65 years of age or older. The average household size was 3.26 and the average family size was 2.93.

There were 3,594 housing units, of which 7.3% were vacant. The homeowner vacancy rate was 2.0% and the rental vacancy rate was 15.4%.

Racial composition as of the 2020 census
Race	Number	Percent
White	8,441	89.5%
Black or African American	102	1.1%
American Indian and Alaska Native	18	0.2%
Asian	262	2.8%
Native Hawaiian and Other Pacific Islander	6	0.1%
Some other race	76	0.8%
Two or more races	529	5.6%
Hispanic or Latino (of any race)	331	3.5%

=== Income and poverty ===
The median income for a household in the village was $113,871, and the median income for a family was $122,585. Males had a median income of $70,487 versus $42,898 for females. The per capita income for the village was $41,978. About 0.8% of families and 2.2% of the population were below the poverty line, including none of those under age 18 and none of those age 65 or over.

== Parks and recreation ==
The most popular tourist attractions in Mahomet are all Champaign County Forest Preserve District properties: Lake of the Woods Park and its award-winning Hartwell C. Howard Golf Course, and the River Bend Forest Preserve. Lake of the Woods Forest Preserve is a 900 acres (3.6 km^{2}) park along the Sangamon River. The park features a botanical garden, a lake, a picturesque covered bridge, many bike trails, and also offers activities like boating, fishing, cross country skiing, and sledding. Within Lake of the Woods Park is the Museum of the Grand Prairie (formerly called the Early American Museum), which has a collection that features life in the 19th and early 20th century in East-Central Illinois. The park has a 3.3-mile (5.3 km) bike path and a bell tower. The Hartwell C. Howard Golf Course is an 18-hole regulation course, a 9-hole par 3 course, a pro shop,and a practice range. The River Bend Forest Preserve is 275 acres (1.11 km^{2}), of which 130 acres (0.53 km^{2}) is water. The park has two large lakes, one of them being the largest lake in Champaign County and 2.5 miles (4.0 km) of forest along the Sangamon River.

== Gallery ==
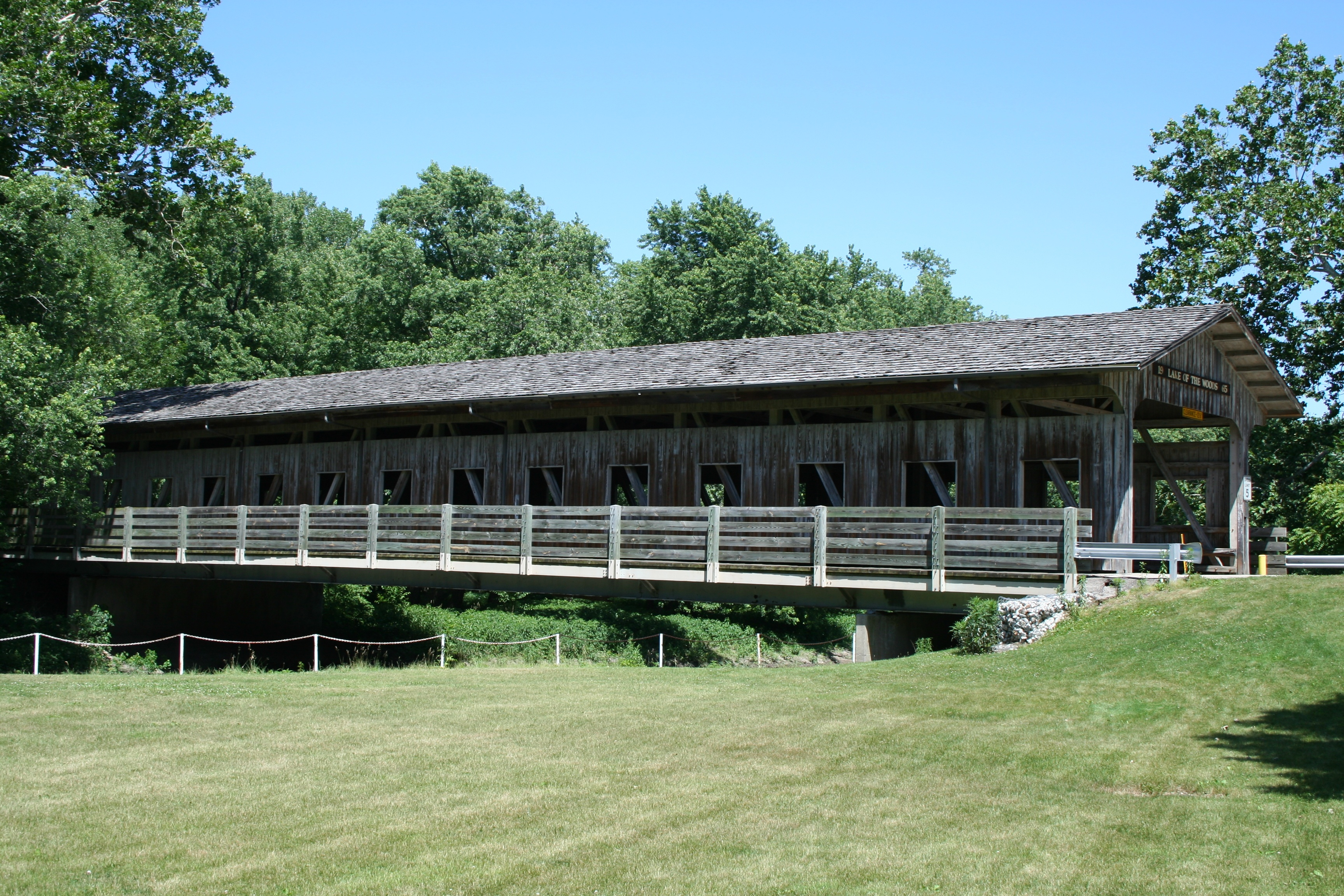
Lake of the Woods forest preserve covered bridge.

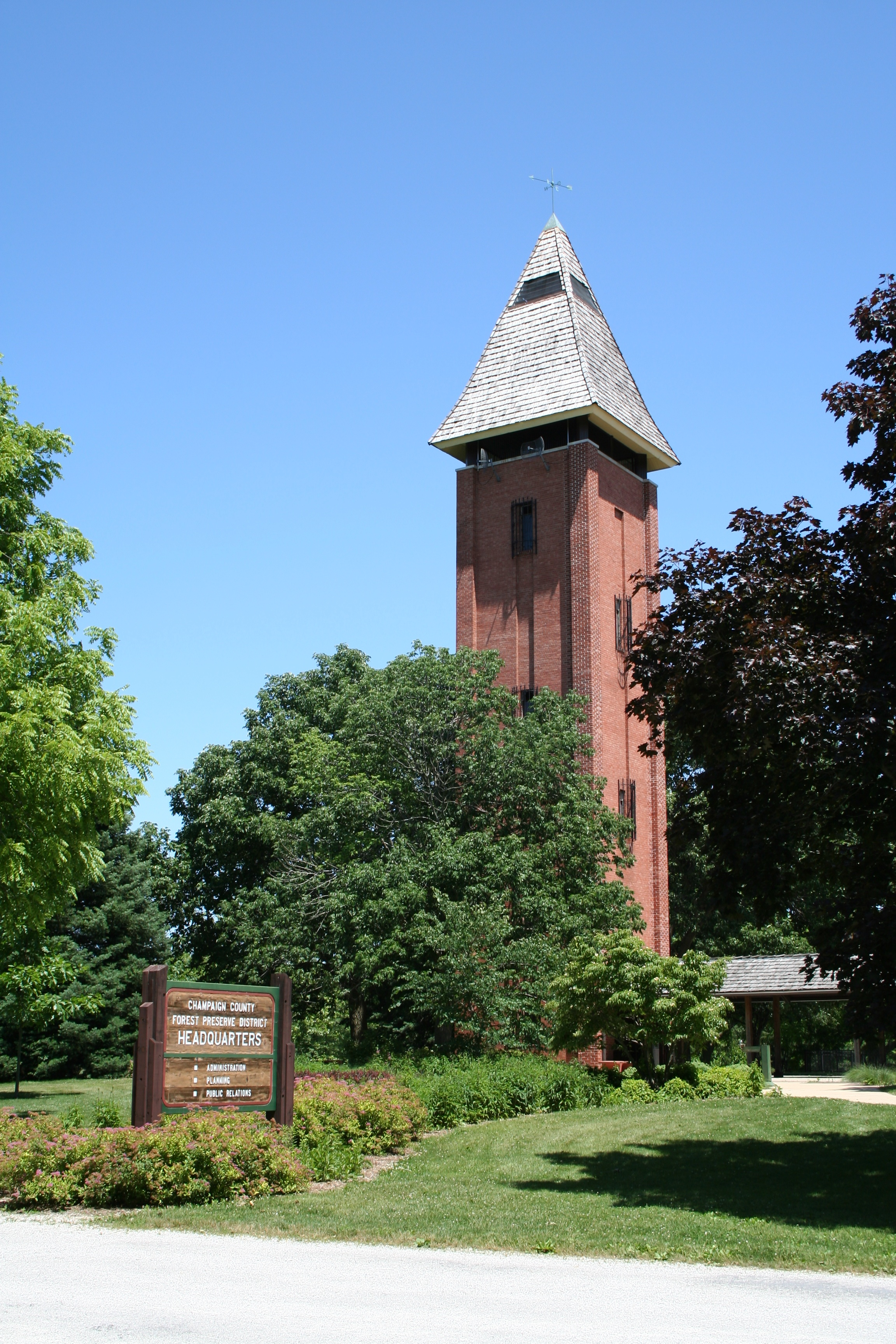
"HI Tower" at the Champaign County Forest Preserve District Headquarters in Lake of the Woods Forest Preserve, Mahomet, Illinois.

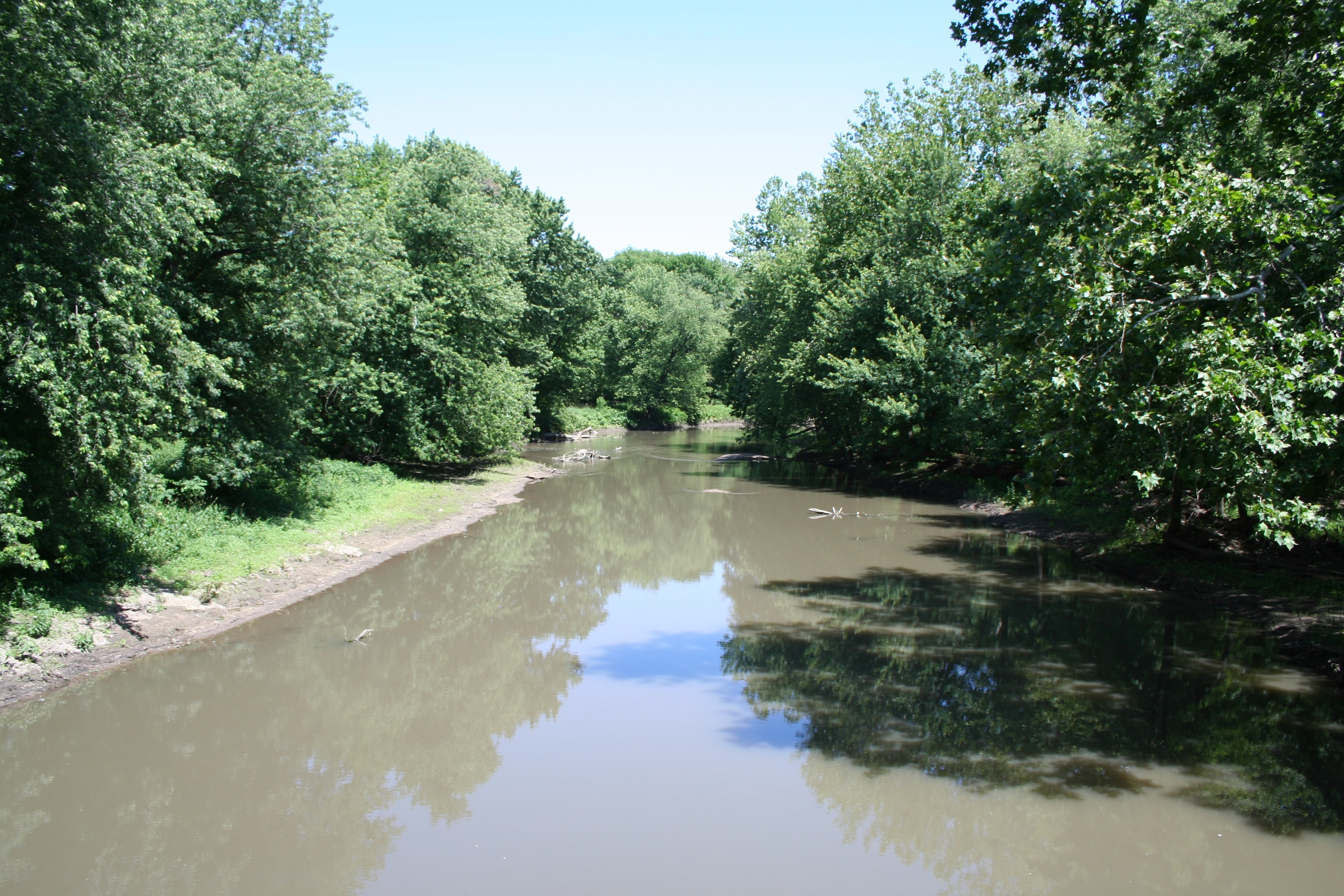
The Sangamon River as viewed from the covered bridge at Lake of the Woods forest preserve.

== Education ==
The Mahomet School District has 2,980 students and 183 instructors spread over five schools.

== Notable people ==
- Melanie Paxson
- Dan Hornbuckle, MMA fighter

== Points of interest ==
- Mabery Gelvin Botanical Garden
- Hazen Bridge - A registered historical bridge northeast of Mahomet.
