= List of United States tornadoes from June to July 2024 =

United States tornadoes from June to July 2024
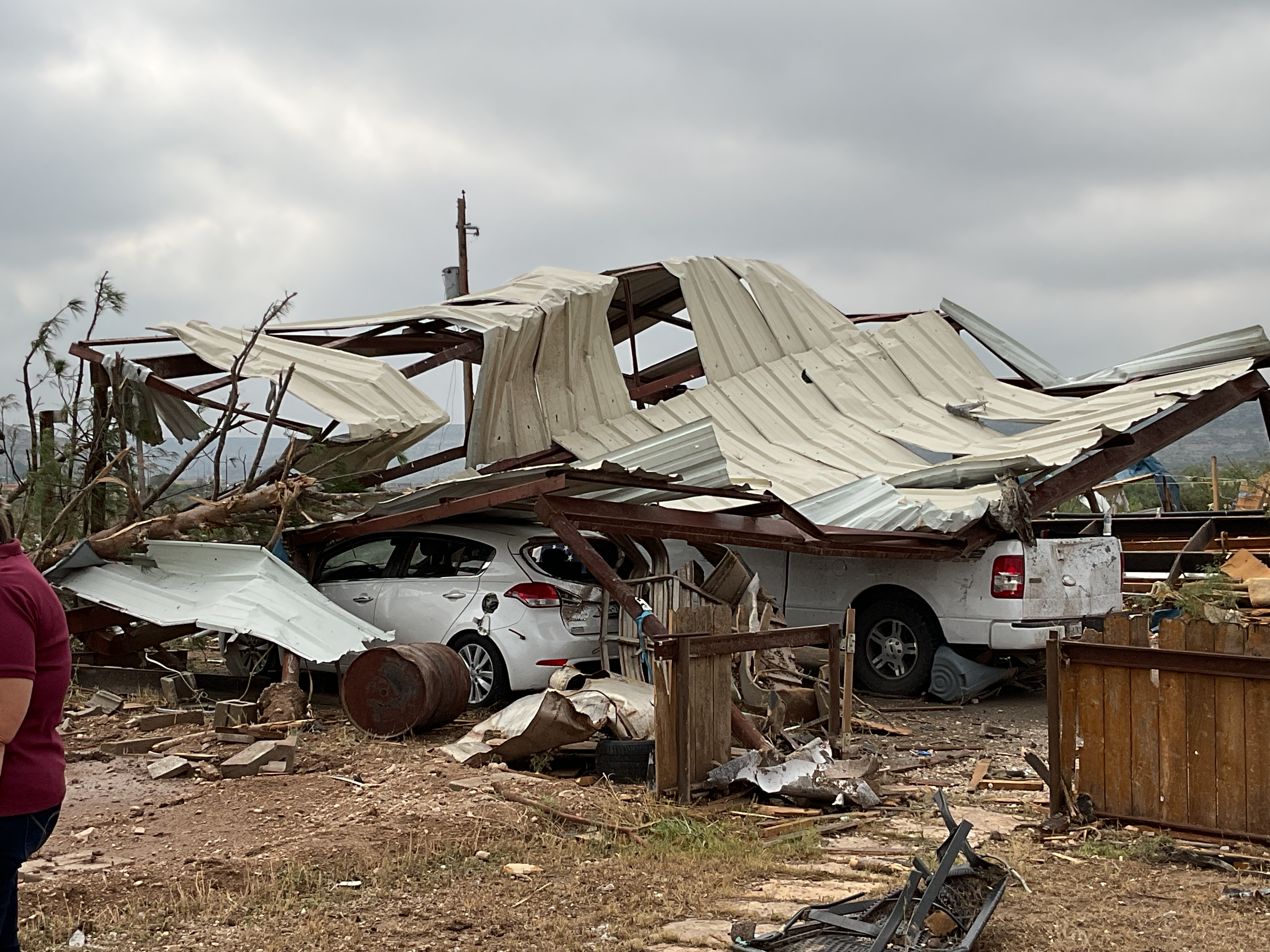
- EF3 damage in Sanderson, Texas after a tornado on June 2
- Timespan: January 5 – March 26
- Maximum rated tornado: EF3 tornado: Sanderson, Texas on June 2; Whitman, Nebraska on June 25; Mount Vernon, Indiana on July 9
- Tornadoes: 380
- Fatalities: 4
- Injuries: 28

This page documents all tornadoes confirmed by various weather forecast offices of the National Weather Service in the United States in June and July 2024. On average, there are 213 confirmed tornadoes in June and 119 confirmed tornadoes in July.

In June, tornadoes are commonly focused across the Midwest and the central and northern Great Plains, and occasionally the Northeast, all due to their proximity to the late spring/early summer jet stream which continues to retreat farther north. Additionally, activity can sometimes increase in the Florida Peninsula as a result of early-season tropical activity. In July, the northern states nearer the Canadian border are most favored for tornadoes, including the Upper Midwest, the Great Lakes and the Northeastern states, due to the positioning of the summertime jet stream. Summer thunderstorms and tropical activity can also result in (mostly weak) tornado activity in the Florida Peninsula.

In a significant reversal from April and May, June featured below average activity with 161 tornadoes. While most days featured tornadoes, they were generally isolated in nature and no major outbreaks occurred during the month with damaging winds and large hail being much more common. July started off somewhat slow before an unusually large outbreak spawned by the landfall of Hurricane Beryl struck the south central states, Ohio River Valley, and Upstate New York between July 8–10. During the middle of month, several days of intense severe weather along with tornadic activity impacted the Midwest, Great Lakes, and Northeast, including a derecho that struck Eastern Iowa and Northern Illinois on July 15. As a result, July surpassed its average count on that day. The second half of July was much less active with far fewer tornadoes. Despite this, the month still finished well above average with 219 tornadoes, which ranked it as the second most active July on record, behind only 1993.

== June ==
Confirmed tornadoes by Enhanced Fujita rating
EFU	EF0	EF1	EF2	EF3	EF4	EF5	Total
51	49	50	9	2	0	0	161

=== June 1 event ===
List of confirmed tornadoes – Saturday, June 1, 2024 (Note: All dates are based on the local time zone where the tornado touched down; however, all times are in Coordinated Universal Time for consistency.)
EF#	Location	County / Parish	State	Start Coord.	Time (UTC)	Path length	Max width
EF1	Fairhope	Baldwin	AL	30.526°N 87.9109°W	08:17–08:19	0.37 mi (0.60 km)	150 yd (140 m)
EF1	A waterspout formed in Mobile Bay and moved onshore, snapping numerous trees and a light pole. One tree fell onto a home.						
EFU	W of Kenton	Gibson	TN	36.2°N 89.03°W	21:05–21:10	unknown	unknown
EFU	A landspout was observed and caused no damage.						
EFU	NNE of Alpine	Pecos	TX	30.79°N 103.48°W	22:06–22:16	1.5 mi (2.4 km)	50 yd (46 m)
EFU	A dusty circulation, possibly a landspout originally, occurred over open terrain and was unable to be surveyed.						

=== June 2 event ===
List of confirmed tornadoes – Sunday, June 2, 2024
EF#	Location	County / Parish	State	Start Coord.	Time (UTC)	Path length	Max width
EFU	N of Burnstad	Logan	ND	46.4216°N 99.6189°W	19:39–19:42	0.56 mi (0.90 km)	50 yd (46 m)
EFU	This tornado touched down in an open field and impacted no structures.						
EFU	S of Woodworth	Stutsman	ND	47.07°N 99.3°W	19:48–19:59	1.52 mi (2.45 km)	250 yd (230 m)
EFU	A tornado remained over open land and did not cause damage.						
EF2	E of Maurine to NE of Opal	Meade	SD	45.0282°N 102.4044°W	21:16–21:23	4.09 mi (6.58 km)	50 yd (46 m)
EF2	A tornado crossed US 212, snapping power poles and uprooting trees.						
EF0	N of Belview	Renville	MN	44.6948°N 95.3342°W	23:18–23:19	0.31 mi (0.50 km)	25 yd (23 m)
EF0	This tornado broke a few large tree branches.						
EF0	Lake Meredith	Hutchinson	TX	35.7°N 101.6°W	00:11–00:14	1.49 mi (2.40 km)	25 yd (23 m)
EF0	This tornado was photographed as it moved over the lake and lifted as it approached the shore. Some tree limbs were damaged.						
EF3	Northwestern Sanderson	Terrell	TX	30.1531°N 102.4236°W	00:14–00:18	0.91 mi (1.46 km)	250 yd (230 m)
EF3	This intense, low-end EF3 tornado impacted a neighborhood on the northwest side of Sanderson. Several homes sustained roof and wall damage and a mobile home was destroyed. A sturdy steel carport was destroyed and trees were debarked. The tornado also moved heavy shipping containers and snapped power poles before lifting. Twelve people were injured.						
EF0	W of Sanford	Hutchinson	TX	35.72°N 101.59°W	00:16–00:18	0.89 mi (1.43 km)	75 yd (69 m)
EF0	Mesquite tree limbs were snapped and other vegetation was damaged.						
EF1	Sanderson	Terrell	TX	30.1423°N 102.3995°W	00:20–00:22	0.37 mi (0.60 km)	50 yd (46 m)
EF1	A brief high-end EF1 rope tornado touched down in the center of Sanderson shortly after the previous one dissipated. It damaged roofs, downed power poles, and destroyed a wooden building.						
EFU	W of Fort Ransom	Ransom	ND	46.52°N 97.93°W	00:47–00:48	0.01 mi (0.016 km)	50 yd (46 m)
EFU	This tornado was reported by a trained storm spotter.						
EFU	N of Silverton	Briscoe	TX	34.622°N 101.406°W	00:57–01:14	9.26 mi (14.90 km)	100 yd (91 m)
EFU	A tornado remained over open fields.						
EFU	NNE of Silverton	Briscoe	TX	34.5759°N 101.2842°W	01:10–01:34	8.7 mi (14.0 km)	100 yd (91 m)
EFU	As the previous tornado occluded, another tornado touched down and remained over open fields.						
EFU	NE of Silverton	Briscoe	TX	34.55°N 101.21°W	01:20–01:23	0.4 mi (0.64 km)	20 yd (18 m)
EFU	A storm chaser observed a tornado.						

=== June 3 event ===
List of confirmed tornadoes – Monday, June 3, 2024
EF#	Location	County / Parish	State	Start Coord.	Time (UTC)	Path length	Max width
EFU	N of Eustace	Henderson	TX	32.3409°N 95.9806°W	00:14–00:15	0.46 mi (0.74 km)	30 yd (27 m)
EFU	A brief tornado was documented in photographs and on video. No damage was found.						

=== June 4 event ===
List of confirmed tornadoes – Tuesday, June 4, 2024
EF#	Location	County / Parish	State	Start Coord.	Time (UTC)	Path length	Max width
EF1	NW of Liberty	Amite	MS	31.18°N 90.87°W	21:36–21:42	4.2 mi (6.8 km)	200 yd (180 m)
EF1	Numerous trees were snapped or uprooted.						
EF1	E of Liberty	Amite	MS	31.17°N 90.75°W	21:48–22:03	5.37 mi (8.64 km)	200 yd (180 m)
EF1	Large swaths of trees were snapped or uprooted, one of which fell onto a home.						
EF1	NE of Pine Grove to WNW of Hillsdale	St. Helena	LA	30.75°N 90.7°W	21:55–22:01	3.05 mi (4.91 km)	100 yd (91 m)
EF1	High-resolution satellite imagery showed extensive tree damage in an inaccessible area that aligned with a tornadic debris signature on radar. Some trees were able to be surveyed, allowing for a rating.						
EF1	SW of Gillsburg to NE of Osyka	Amite, Pike	MS	31.01°N 90.69°W	21:55–22:11	15.56 mi (25.04 km)	275 yd (251 m)
EF1	A QLCS tornado snapped and uprooted numerous trees.						
EFU	S of Greensburg	St. Helena	LA	30.81°N 90.68°W	21:57–22:02	4.38 mi (7.05 km)	75 yd (69 m)
EFU	High-resolution satellite imagery showed notable swaths of tree damage in an inaccessible area. No ground survey was able to be conducted.						
EF0	W of Summit	Amite	MS	31.3°N 90.62°W	21:58–22:02	2.94 mi (4.73 km)	50 yd (46 m)
EF0	The roof to a small outbuilding was damaged and numerous damaged trees were noted on satellite imagery.						
EF1	SE of Greenlaw to ENE of Lewiston	Tangipahoa	LA	30.95°N 90.47°W	22:08–22:17	7.14 mi (11.49 km)	300 yd (270 m)
EF1	Trees were snapped and uprooted.						
EF1	Amite	Tangipahoa	LA	30.73°N 90.56°W	22:08–22:14	3.56 mi (5.73 km)	100 yd (91 m)
EF1	This tornado initially started in a densely wooded area before moving across I-55 into Amite. Only trees were damaged.						
EFU	NE of Clare	Webster	IA	42.6143°N 94.2988°W	22:31–22:32	0.22 mi (0.35 km)	30 yd (27 m)
EFU	A brief tornado was filmed.						

=== June 5 event ===
List of confirmed tornadoes – Wednesday, June 5, 2024
EF#	Location	County / Parish	State	Start Coord.	Time (UTC)	Path length	Max width
EF1	S of East Lynn	Vermilion	IL	40.4146°N 87.8138°W	13:27–13:29	1.17 mi (1.88 km)	100 yd (91 m)
EF1	A house lost a portion of its roof, several barns sustained roof and wall damage, and several grain bins were destroyed. Trees were uprooted and tree limbs were snapped.						
EF0	ESE of Grayling	Crawford	MI	44.586°N 84.5225°W	17:19–17:20	0.27 mi (0.43 km)	90 yd (82 m)
EF0	This brief tornado blew down numerous trees at a golf club. Some fell on a house.						
EF1	Livonia	Wayne	MI	42.38°N 83.43°W	19:30–19:39	5.75 mi (9.25 km)	450 yd (410 m)
EF1	1 death – The tornado snapped tree limbs, uprooted and sheared off trees, and damaged some houses. A toddler was killed and one person was injured by a fallen tree.						
EF0	ENE of Bunker Hill to E of Inwood	Berkeley	WV	39.3375°N 78.033°W	20:04–20:08	0.92 mi (1.48 km)	65 yd (59 m)
EF0	At least one structure sustained gutter damage. Trees and tree limbs were damaged. Grass was disturbed in a rotating pattern.						
EF0	N of Kearneysville	Berkeley	WV	39.3854°N 77.9261°W	20:29–20:34	1.69 mi (2.72 km)	110 yd (100 m)
EF0	Trees were snapped or uprooted.						
EF0	W of Shepherdstown	Jefferson	WV	39.4168°N 77.8293°W	20:58–21:02	1.25 mi (2.01 km)	130 yd (120 m)
EF0	Trees and tree limbs were downed.						
EF0	Southern Boonsboro	Washington	MD	39.4898°N 77.6625°W	21:40–21:41	0.59 mi (0.95 km)	50 yd (46 m)
EF0	A trained storm spotter and radar data confirmed a tornado. It did not cause damage.						
EF1	ESE of Waterford to S of Stumptown	Loudoun	VA	39.1655°N 77.5648°W	22:42–22:43	1.05 mi (1.69 km)	125 yd (114 m)
EF1	The tornado caused minor damage to windows and siding and tore the plastic roof off a small shelter. Trees were snapped and uprooted. A tornado debris signature was evident on radar.						
EF1	Poolesville to SW of Germantown	Montgomery	MD	39.1206°N 77.4851°W	23:01–23:27	8.83 mi (14.21 km)	150 yd (140 m)
EF1	Numerous trellises were snapped and a 9,000 lb (4,100 kg) shipping container was uplifted and bounced twice, damaging telephone phones and leaving divots in the ground. Doors to a barn were collapsed and numerous trees were snapped or uprooted.						
EF1	Gaithersburg to Ashton	Montgomery	MD	39.1355°N 77.2863°W	23:27–00:03	15.16 mi (24.40 km)	150 yd (140 m)
EF1	This tornado developed as the EF1 Poolesville tornado dissipated. Numerous trees were snapped and uprooted and some power lines were downed. Seven homes in Gaithersburg were condemned as a result of damage from trees. One large oak tree injured five people when it fell on a house.						
EF0	N of Westminster	Carroll	MD	39.61°N 77°W	23:42–23:43	0.69 mi (1.11 km)	100 yd (91 m)
EF0	A few structures sustained minor damage and a few trees were downed.						
EF1	W of Bexar, AL	Itawamba (MS), Marion (AL)	MS, AL	34.1645°N 88.2121°W	23:43–23:48	3.37 mi (5.42 km)	300 yd (270 m)
EF1	Several trees were snapped or uprooted along the Mississippi/Alabama state line.						
EF0	S of Bangs	Knox	OH	40.3°N 82.57°W	23:44–23:56	3.27 mi (5.26 km)	80 yd (73 m)
EF0	An EF0 tornado was confirmed by NWS Cleveland. Preliminary information.						
EF1	NNE of Bluff to S of Pull Tight	Fayette, Marion	AL	33.8984°N 87.8774°W	23:52–00:01	7.23 mi (11.64 km)	325 yd (297 m)
EF1	Several stores in a strip mall sustained cosmetic damage including blown-out glass doors. One home had minor siding damage and others had shingle damage. Trees were uprooted and snapped along the path with one tree falling on a home. The tornado moved through the northern and western parts of Winfield.						
EF2	N of Eldersburg to SW of Finksburg	Carroll	MD	39.4259°N 76.9717°W	23:59–00:11	4.42 mi (7.11 km)	100 yd (91 m)
EF2	A house sustained siding and shingle damage. Hundreds of trees were snapped, uprooted or had large limbs snapped. A few of the trees were debarked.						
EF0	ESE of East Liberty	Delaware	OH	40.3156°N 82.8008°W	00:02–00:03	0.25 mi (0.40 km)	50 yd (46 m)
EF0	A weak tornado was captured on video. Minor tree damage occurred.						
EF1	SSE of Atwood to Belgreen	Franklin	AL	34.3494°N 87.9908°W	00:06–00:25	12.86 mi (20.70 km)	225 yd (206 m)
EF1	Trusses were damaged and small portions of roofing were ripped off of two chicken houses. A shed lost about a quarter of its roof as well. Numerous trees were snapped or uprooted, one of which fell onto a home and another that fell on a porch roof, damaging it.						
EF1	Columbia	Howard	MD	39.215°N 76.822°W	00:31–00:33	0.92 mi (1.48 km)	75 yd (69 m)
EF1	Roofing fascia was peeled from a townhome. Trees were uprooted and snapped. About a dozen parked cars were damaged by falling trees and tree limbs.						
EF1	Arbutus to southern Baltimore	Baltimore, City of Baltimore	MD	39.2348°N 76.7063°W	00:45–00:57	3.34 mi (5.38 km)	175 yd (160 m)
EF1	Four large overhead doors were blown out on a warehouse and a building supply store lost awning and roofing material. Numerous trees, power lines, and telephone lines were downed along the path. One large oak tree fell on a house and two cars.						
EF0	Eastern Baltimore	City of Baltimore	MD	39.28°N 76.5808°W	01:01–01:03	0.43 mi (0.69 km)	90 yd (82 m)
EF0	Small signs were tossed and trees were snapped or uprooted.						
EF1	Middle River	Baltimore	MD	39.3359°N 76.4156°W	01:27–01:30	0.94 mi (1.51 km)	110 yd (100 m)
EF1	A brief tornado damaged several mobile homes, removing shingles and underpinning. Several sheds, carports, and a trampoline were tossed and several trees were snapped. A tornado debris signature was evident on radar.						
EF0	SSW of Marne	Licking	OH	40.0538°N 82.3088°W	02:56–02:57	0.6 mi (0.97 km)	150 yd (140 m)
EF0	This brief tornado damaged a swath of trees and minorly damaged structures.						

=== June 6 event ===
List of confirmed tornadoes – Thursday, June 6, 2024
EF#	Location	County / Parish	State	Start Coord.	Time (UTC)	Path length	Max width
EF2	Frazeysburg	Muskingum	OH	40.1191°N 82.1367°W	04:37–04:40	1.25 mi (2.01 km)	120 yd (110 m)
EF2	A narrow but strong tornado occurred just after midnight, causing significant damage in Frazeysburg. The second story of a home was removed, resulting in partial wall collapse. Two other homes and a small store lost their roofs, two barns were destroyed, and Frazeysburg Elementary School sustained fascia damage. Several trees were either snapped or uprooted and a phone pole was knocked down.						
EFU	W of Santa Rosa Beach	Walton	FL	30.35°N 86.25°W	19:50	unknown	unknown
EFU	A waterspout moved ashore and quickly dissipated.						
EFU	ESE of LaBelle	Hendry	FL	26.71°N 81.25°W	21:42	unknown	unknown
EFU	This landspout was observed over citrus and sugar cane fields.						
EF0	Lockhart	Orange	FL	28.63°N 81.45°W	23:00–23:01	0.03 mi (0.048 km)	5 yd (4.6 m)
EF0	A FDOT camera filmed a landspout lofting dust. No damage was reported.						

=== June 7 event ===
List of confirmed tornadoes – Friday, June 7, 2024
EF#	Location	County / Parish	State	Start Coord.	Time (UTC)	Path length	Max width
EF0	W of Holbrook	Navajo	AZ	34.9°N 110.2582°W	20:31–20:33	1 mi (1.6 km)	10 yd (9.1 m)
EF0	A landspout was filmed.						
EF2	NE of Arnold	Custer	NE	41.539°N 100.058°W	22:19–22:25	1.73 mi (2.78 km)	750 yd (690 m)
EF2	Power poles were snapped off at the base and an irrigation pivot system and their pump house sustained significant damage. Pipes were wrapped around power poles and the pump house. Some pipes were carried over half a mile (800m). Trees were uprooted.						

=== June 8 event ===
List of confirmed tornadoes – Saturday, June 8, 2024
EF#	Location	County / Parish	State	Start Coord.	Time (UTC)	Path length	Max width
EFU	S of Flagler	Kit Carson	CO	39.1433°N 103.0596°W	22:37–22:46	4.07 mi (6.55 km)	50 yd (46 m)
EFU	A storm chaser filmed a tornado over open country. No damage was seen in the video.						

=== June 9 event ===
List of confirmed tornadoes – Sunday, June 9, 2024
EF#	Location	County / Parish	State	Start Coord.	Time (UTC)	Path length	Max width
EFU	SW of Villa Grove	Saguache	CO	38.1886°N 106.0282°W	23:10–23:15	0.5 mi (0.80 km)	2 yd (1.8 m)
EFU	A photograph was taken of a landspout tornado.						

=== June 10 event ===
List of confirmed tornadoes – Monday, June 10, 2024
EF#	Location	County / Parish	State	Start Coord.	Time (UTC)	Path length	Max width
EFU	E of Loop	Gaines	TX	32.9297°N 102.3658°W	00:22–00:25	1.16 mi (1.87 km)	50 yd (46 m)
EFU	Multiple members of the public observed a brief cone tornado.						
EFU	ENE of Sand	Dawson	TX	32.7396°N 102.0975°W	00:23–00:24	0.51 mi (0.82 km)	25 yd (23 m)
EFU	Broadcast media captured a brief tornado over an open field.						

=== June 12 event ===
Event in Florida was associated with the June 2024 South Florida floods.

List of confirmed tornadoes – Wednesday, June 12, 2024
EF#	Location	County / Parish	State	Start Coord.	Time (UTC)	Path length	Max width
EF1	Hobe Sound to Jupiter Island	Martin	FL	27.059°N 80.1412°W	14:37–14:44	1.74 mi (2.80 km)	500 yd (460 m)
EF1	A home had some of its shingles torn and a grocery store sustained limited roof damage. Numerous trees were snapped or uprooted by this EF1 tornado that continued into the Atlantic Ocean as a waterspout before dissipating.						
EF1	E of Isabella to ENE of Murphy City	Lake	MN	47.6136°N 91.2513°W	23:08–23:15	4.2 mi (6.8 km)	150 yd (140 m)
EF1	This tornado was discovered from high-resolution satellite imagery. Numerous trees were snapped and/or uprooted as the tornado tracked east-southeast in the Superior National Forest.						
EF2	NE of Jenkins to N of Breezy Point	Crow Wing	MN	46.6901°N 94.2572°W	23:18–23:23	3.16 mi (5.09 km)	700 yd (640 m)
EF2	Numerous homes suffered roof damage with several losing large portions of their roofs. Extensive tree damage occurred with up to 80% of trees uprooted or snapped along one portion of the damage path. An hour-long 1–2-foot (0.3–0.6 m) storm surge was reported on one lake. All tornadoes in Crow Wing and Aitkin Counties were part of the same tornado family.						
EF0	NW of Wright to W of Cromwell	Carlton	MN	46.7235°N 93.0607°W	23:42–23:54	7.8 mi (12.6 km)	50 yd (46 m)
EF0	The tornado caused widespread tree damage including large limbs and treetops that were snapped. Power lines were also damaged.						
EF2	W of Wolford to SSW of Aitkin	Crow Wing, Aitkin	MN	46.5473°N 93.9912°W	23:45–00:04	14.66 mi (23.59 km)	200 yd (180 m)
EF2	A low-end EF2 tornado caused roof damage to homes and flipped an RV. Falling trees destroyed several garages and outbuildings. A fish house was thrown nearly 100 yards (91 m). Numerous trees were uprooted and snapped.						
EF1	SW of Aitkin to NW of Glory	Aitkin	MN	46.4904°N 93.7457°W	00:03–00:10	4.71 mi (7.58 km)	50 yd (46 m)
EF1	This tornado began on the north side of Hammal Lake, inflicting pockets of extensive tree damage. A three-season cabin and boat house were completely destroyed and partially thrown into the water. The tornado tracked east-southeast, uprooting and snapping several more trees. The tornado knocked over an 85 ft (26 m) tall antenna tower before ending over Ripple Lake.						
EF0	N of Decatur	Burt	NE	42.016°N 96.248°W	00:12–00:13	0.54 mi (0.87 km)	75 yd (69 m)
EF0	Tree limbs were broken and power lines were downed.						
EF0	S of Glen	Aitkin	MN	46.4001°N 93.5293°W	00:25–00:29	1.6 mi (2.6 km)	20 yd (18 m)
EF0	A storm chaser filmed a wispy tornado in a forested area with no debris or reported damage.						

=== June 13 event ===
List of confirmed tornadoes – Thursday, June 13, 2024
EF#	Location	County / Parish	State	Start Coord.	Time (UTC)	Path length	Max width
EFU	NE of Marienthal	Wichita	KS	38.5837°N 101.1294°W	20:05–20:20	0.02 mi (0.032 km)	25 yd (23 m)
EFU	This landspout remained nearly stationary in an open field.						
EFU	E of Good Hope	McDonough	IL	40.547°N 90.649°W	23:56–23:57	0.06 mi (0.097 km)	10 yd (9.1 m)
EFU	A brief tornado was observed in an open field. No damage was reported.						
EFU	NE of Bardolph	McDonough	IL	40.514°N 90.556°W	00:00–00:02	0.08 mi (0.13 km)	10 yd (9.1 m)
EFU	A brief tornado was observed in an open field. No damage was reported.						
EF1	SE of Ballard	McLean	IL	40.6694°N 88.7291°W	01:28–01:29	0.71 mi (1.14 km)	60 yd (55 m)
EF1	An outbuilding lost a large portion of its roof and a house lost an antenna and windows. This and four other EF1 tornadoes were embedded in a broader area damaging thunderstorm wind.						
EF1	SE of Chenoa	McLean	IL	40.6836°N 88.6657°W	01:29–01:30	0.61 mi (0.98 km)	60 yd (55 m)
EF1	A high-end EF1 tornado destroyed a barn.						
EF1	ESE of Ballard	McLean	IL	40.6649°N 88.6698°W	01:31–01:32	1.27 mi (2.04 km)	80 yd (73 m)
EF1	A farm outbuilding lost a large portion of its roof.						
EF1	ESE of Anchor	McLean	IL	40.5602°N 88.5059°W	01:45–01:46	0.94 mi (1.51 km)	60 yd (55 m)
EF1	A machine shed was destroyed with debris thrown half a mile (800m) and a house sustained roof damage.						
EF1	S of Anchor to WNW of Gibson City	McLean, Ford	IL	40.5395°N 88.5256°W	01:46–01:52	7.55 mi (12.15 km)	1,300 yd (1,200 m)
EF1	A large, high-end EF1 tornado severely damaged or destroyed farm buildings and peeled roof material from houses. Trees and power poles were snapped.						

=== June 14 event ===
List of confirmed tornadoes – Friday, June 14, 2024
EF#	Location	County / Parish	State	Start Coord.	Time (UTC)	Path length	Max width
EFU	NNW of Crownpoint	McKinley	NM	35.7913°N 108.2245°W	19:46–19:59	2.55 mi (4.10 km)	30 yd (27 m)
EFU	Multiple photos and a video showed a well-defined landspout tracking over rural land.						
EF0	Lawrence	Mercer	NJ	40.2607°N 74.7245°W	22:59–23:00	0.13 mi (0.21 km)	60 yd (55 m)
EF0	A landspout tornado brought trees down on a gas station, snapped a sign, tossed donation bins, and flipped several cars. A post office building lost metal roofing material and a rooftop HVAC unit. Parking lot signs were blown down and tossed up to 250 yards (230 m). Trees and tree limbs were downed.						

=== June 15 event ===
List of confirmed tornadoes – Saturday, June 15, 2024
EF#	Location	County / Parish	State	Start Coord.	Time (UTC)	Path length	Max width
EF1	SSW of Meadow Grove	Madison	NE	41.92°N 97.762°W	22:42–22:53	0.73 mi (1.17 km)	300 yd (270 m)
EF1	A very slow-moving tornado destroyed a metal shed and a cattle trailer. Farm machinery was tossed. A fence and irrigation pivot were damaged.						
EFU	NE of Newman Grove	Madison	NE	41.84°N 97.69°W	23:14–23:15	0.01 mi (0.016 km)	10 yd (9.1 m)
EFU	A funnel cloud produced a brief circulation on the ground.						
EF0	WNW of Pilger	Stanton	NE	42.0793°N 97.1802°W	23:37–23:38	0.08 mi (0.13 km)	20 yd (18 m)
EF0	A very brief tornado damaged trees and windows in a home.						
EF0	N of Pilger	Stanton, Cuming	NE	42.023°N 97.029°W	23:56–23:58	2.15 mi (3.46 km)	25 yd (23 m)
EF0	A sunshade sustained very minor damage.						
EF1	N of Clarkson	Stanton	NE	41.81°N 97.13°W	00:06–00:12	2.1 mi (3.4 km)	50 yd (46 m)
EF1	A machine shed was damaged and trees were snapped.						
EFU	ESE of Tecumseh	Johnson	NE	40.346°N 96.122°W	00:07–00:08	0.44 mi (0.71 km)	20 yd (18 m)
EFU	A funnel cloud with a ground-level circulation was witnessed and photographed.						

=== June 16 event ===
List of confirmed tornadoes – Sunday, June 16, 2024
EF#	Location	County / Parish	State	Start Coord.	Time (UTC)	Path length	Max width
EFU	S of Crystal River	Citrus	FL	28.8847°N 82.6012°W	22:02–22:04	0.02 mi (0.032 km)	50 yd (46 m)
EFU	A waterspout moved ashore and significantly damaged two structures. Despite the damage, an EFU rating was applied.						

=== June 17 event ===
List of confirmed tornadoes – Monday, June 17, 2024
EF#	Location	County / Parish	State	Start Coord.	Time (UTC)	Path length	Max width
EF0	S of Greenwood	Clark	WI	44.742°N 90.601°W	13:42–13:43	0.42 mi (0.68 km)	25 yd (23 m)
EF0	An outbuilding was heavily damaged.						
EF1	E of Clark	Clark, Taylor	WI	45.03°N 90.57°W	13:55–13:57	0.91 mi (1.46 km)	45 yd (41 m)
EF1	An outbuilding was heavily damaged.						
EF0	Colby	Clark, Marathon	WI	44.9046°N 90.3161°W	13:59–14:01	0.81 mi (1.30 km)	46 yd (42 m)
EF0	A brief tornado collapsed one outbuilding, caused door damage to another, caused minor roof damage to a house, and broke tree limbs.						

=== June 18 event ===
List of confirmed tornadoes – Tuesday, June 18, 2024
EF#	Location	County / Parish	State	Start Coord.	Time (UTC)	Path length	Max width
EFU	WSW of Albany	Athens	OH	39.22°N 82.24°W	18:52	unknown	unknown
EFU	A landspout occurred in a wooden area.						
EFU	NNW of Eminence	Finney	KS	38.18°N 100.54°W	20:46	0.01 mi (0.016 km)	10 yd (9.1 m)
EFU	A tornado was recorded in pictures and video. No damage was reported.						
EFU	E of Ensign	Ford	KS	37.65°N 100.21°W	23:47–23:52	2.9 mi (4.7 km)	10 yd (9.1 m)
EFU	A tornado was recorded in pictures and a tornado debris signature was observed. No damage was reported.						
EF1	ENE of Dresser to S of Centuria	Polk	WI	45.3532°N 92.6146°W	02:13–02:20	4.99 mi (8.03 km)	100 yd (91 m)
EF1	Several homes and farms were damaged, including a double-wide mobile home that lost much of its roof. Hundreds of trees were uprooted or snapped.						

=== June 19 event ===
Events were associated with Tropical Storm Alberto.

List of confirmed tornadoes – Wednesday, June 19, 2024
EF#	Location	County / Parish	State	Start Coord.	Time (UTC)	Path length	Max width
EF0	NW of Rockport	Aransas	TX	28.0404°N 97.0835°W	21:49–21:51	0.28 mi (0.45 km)	50 yd (46 m)
EF0	A shed was overturned. Trees and two carports were damaged.						
EF1	NW of Bellville	Austin	TX	29.9698°N 96.2826°W	22:25–22:27	1.9 mi (3.1 km)	100 yd (91 m)
EF1	One business lost its metal roof and at least two homes were damaged by wind, trees, and debris. Numerous trees were uprooted and snapped. A portion of the path on private property could not be surveyed; the path may have been longer.						
EF0	SSW of Fulton	Aransas	TX	28.0509°N 97.0381°W	23:43–23:44	0.2 mi (0.32 km)	40 yd (37 m)
EF0	A waterspout came ashore causing a home to lose a few shingles. Some tree limbs were broken and a dying palm tree was snapped.						

=== June 20 event ===
List of confirmed tornadoes – Thursday, June 20, 2024
EF#	Location	County / Parish	State	Start Coord.	Time (UTC)	Path length	Max width
EFU	NW of Hawk Springs	Goshen	WY	41.821°N 104.398°W	20:45–21:00	1.7 mi (2.7 km)	20 yd (18 m)
EFU	This tornado likely started as a landspout before transitioning into a mesocyclonic tornado. Only limited damage to fencing was found as well as scattered plant debris which was not enough to assign a rating.						
EF1	E of Morrill to WNW of Mitchell	Scotts Bluff	NE	41.956°N 103.882°W	21:29–21:34	1.41 mi (2.27 km)	50 yd (46 m)
EF1	This tornado occurred along the northern fringe of a much larger area of powerful 90–100 mph (140–160 km/h) straight-line outflow winds. Center pivots and metal outbuildings were heavily damaged or destroyed, a home suffered severe roof damage, and trees were snapped.						
EFU	E of Platteville	Weld	CO	40.22°N 104.79°W	21:41–21:45	0.07 mi (0.11 km)	20 yd (18 m)
EFU	A landspout tornado occurred over an open field.						
EF1	S of Ainsworth	Brown	NE	42.404°N 99.82°W	22:21	0.05 mi (0.080 km)	25 yd (23 m)
EF1	This tornado struck a farmstead, destroying a single-wide mobile home and some outbuildings. Trees and tree limbs were snapped. An in-depth analysis of the structures could not be made due to severe flooding.						
EF1	S of Long Pine	Brown	NE	42.436°N 99.718°W	22:47	0.05 mi (0.080 km)	25 yd (23 m)
EF1	Numerous spotter reports and photos confirmed this tornado that moved over open terrain. An area where large tree limbs were snapped and a few trees uprooted was enough to garner an EF1 rating for the tornado, but an exact track and width could not be determined due to severe flooding.						

=== June 21 event ===
List of confirmed tornadoes – Friday, June 21, 2024
EF#	Location	County / Parish	State	Start Coord.	Time (UTC)	Path length	Max width
EF0	Northwest Harwinton to E of Harwinton	Litchfield	CT	41.78°N 73.07°W	20:54–21:04	2 mi (3.2 km)	250 yd (230 m)
EF0	Some trees were uprooted while other trees had limbs snapped.						
EFU	SW of Montrose	Ashley	AR	33.29°N 91.5097°W	22:25–22:26	0.04 mi (0.064 km)	25 yd (23 m)
EFU	A brief landspout occurred.						
EFU	NW of La Sal	San Juan	UT	38.38°N 109.46°W	23:30–00:00	0.5 mi (0.80 km)	20 yd (18 m)
EFU	Multiple photos and videos showed a landspout occurring in open land.						

=== June 22 event ===
List of confirmed tornadoes – Saturday, June 22, 2024
EF#	Location	County / Parish	State	Start Coord.	Time (UTC)	Path length	Max width
EFU	S of Garland	Box Elder	UT	41.74°N 112.16°W	15:26	unknown	unknown
EFU	A tornado was photographed.						
EF1	NE of West Winfield	Herkimer	NY	42.9045°N 75.1648°W	15:46–15:51	1.96 mi (3.15 km)	200 yd (180 m)
EF1	A small shed was destroyed, a metal canoe was wrapped around power lines, and a barn was damaged. Several trees were snapped and uprooted, some of which fell and damaged houses.						
EF1	S of Butman to NW of Hard Luck	Gladwin	MI	44.1055°N 84.4691°W	20:05–20:27	10.3 mi (16.6 km)	200 yd (180 m)
EF1	Numerous trees were damaged and some minor damage occurred to a lakehouse.						
EF0	W of Cornelia	Grant	WI	42.6847°N 90.6188°W	22:37–22:38	0.16 mi (0.26 km)	40 yd (37 m)
EF0	Tree damage was observed.						
EF0	SSE of Belmont to SE of Truman	Lafayette	WI	42.7012°N 90.3216°W	23:02–23:12	5.57 mi (8.96 km)	75 yd (69 m)
EF0	Storm chasers filmed a tornado that tracked primarily through farmland. One barn was struck and had its roof damaged and tree damage also occurred.						
EF2	ESE of Lamont to NE of Argyle	Lafayette, Green	WI	42.6969°N 89.9625°W	23:36–23:48	6.87 mi (11.06 km)	500 yd (460 m)
EF2	A high-end EF2 tornado struck multiple barns, destroyed many farm fields and leveled the Apple Grove Lutheran Church, a landmark of Argyle built in 1893.						
EF1	S of Marshall to S of Waterloo	Dane, Jefferson	WI	43.1398°N 89.0708°W	00:10–00:15	4.5 mi (7.2 km)	300 yd (270 m)
EF1	Several farms and large areas of forest were damaged.						
EF1	E of Hubbleton	Jefferson	WI	43.1751°N 88.8431°W	00:30–00:35	2.05 mi (3.30 km)	150 yd (140 m)
EF1	A farm was significantly damaged.						
EF2	Southern Janesville	Rock	WI	42.6301°N 89.1105°W	00:42–00:53	6.03 mi (9.70 km)	700 yd (640 m)
EF2	A low-end EF2 tornado damaged many homes with one house stripped of its roof and a portion of its second story. Moderate tree damage was also observed just east of highway D where at least a hundred trees were snapped.						
EF1	E of Delavan to SE of Williams Bay	Walworth	WI	42.6242°N 88.6101°W	01:22–01:30	6.01 mi (9.67 km)	150 yd (140 m)
EF1	A tornado began over Delavan Lake and as it made landfall on the other side of the lake, numerous houses lost portions or most of their roofs. The tornado continued southeast before lifting over Geneva Lake.						
EF1	E of Fontana-on-Geneva Lake to ENE of Como	Walworth	WI	42.5386°N 88.531°W	01:22–01:29	5.26 mi (8.47 km)	100 yd (91 m)
EF1	Near a golf course, the tornado initially damaged trees. The tornado, moving northeast, then crossed Geneva Lake severely damaging a dock and inflicting more tree damage. The tornado then lifted over Lake Como.						
EF0	N of Twin Lakes	Kenosha	WI	42.5561°N 88.2707°W	01:42–01:44	1.41 mi (2.27 km)	40 yd (37 m)
EF0	A brief tornado destroyed a small shed and damaged numerous trees.						
EF0	Elburn	Kane	IL	41.891°N 88.4804°W	03:37–03:41	2.34 mi (3.77 km)	300 yd (270 m)
EF0	A weak tornado damaged trees and corn crops.						
EF0	S of West Chicago to southern Wheaton to NE of Lisle	DuPage	IL	41.8538°N 88.1967°W	03:58–04:08	7.82 mi (12.59 km)	300 yd (270 m)
EF0	This tornado began in a forest preserve and moved southwest, causing minor damage near Wheaton Warrenville South High School. The tornado continued moving southeast, damaging some signs to a shopping center. Tree damage continued all the way into the Morton Arboretum, where the tornado lifted.						
EF0	SE Glen Ellyn to Butterfield	DuPage	IL	41.8471°N 88.0563°W	04:08–04:10	1.19 mi (1.92 km)	50 yd (46 m)
EF0	Minor damage occurred to residences and trees.						
EF0	SW Oak Brook to NE Downers Grove	DuPage	IL	41.8206°N 87.9948°W	04:13–04:14	0.86 mi (1.38 km)	50 yd (46 m)
EF0	Multiple trees had large branches broken, homes had minor roofing damage, fences were damaged, and a cupola on a home was damaged.						

=== June 23 event ===
List of confirmed tornadoes – Sunday, June 23, 2024
EF#	Location	County / Parish	State	Start Coord.	Time (UTC)	Path length	Max width
EF1	S of Dublin	Cheshire	NH	42.89°N 72.09°W	21:09–21:13	3.36 mi (5.41 km)	40 yd (37 m)
EF1	A roof had some shingles damaged and dozens of trees were snapped and/or uprooted.						
EFU	Southern St. George	Washington	UT	37°N 113.53°W	22:45	unknown	unknown
EFU	A small but well-defined tornado was observed.						
EFU	S of Blanding	San Juan	UT	37.57°N 109.47°W	01:00	unknown	unknown
EFU	A tornado was photographed along US 191.						

=== June 24 event ===
List of confirmed tornadoes – Monday, June 24, 2024
EF#	Location	County / Parish	State	Start Coord.	Time (UTC)	Path length	Max width
EF0	NNE of Winner	Roseau	MN	48.7°N 95.38°W	23:19–23:24	0.5 mi (0.80 km)	50 yd (46 m)
EF0	A brief tornado was photographed. No damage was reported.						

=== June 25 event ===
List of confirmed tornadoes – Tuesday, June 25, 2024
EF#	Location	County / Parish	State	Start Coord.	Time (UTC)	Path length	Max width
EF1	NNW of Keshena to W of Underhill	Menominee, Oconto	WI	44.909°N 88.6539°W	07:25–07:34	8.96 mi (14.42 km)	83 yd (76 m)
EF1	Multiple trees were snapped and uprooted along with several campers flipped at a campground. A residence was also damaged. This is the third recorded tornado in Menominee County since records began in 1950.						
EFU	WNW of Newton	Jasper	IA	41.7232°N 93.1114°W	21:32–21:34	0.32 mi (0.51 km)	30 yd (27 m)
EFU	This tornado was observed by several people as it remained in rural farmland.						
EFU	S of Newton	Jasper	IA	41.6437°N 93.0726°W	21:41–21:46	0.59 mi (0.95 km)	55 yd (50 m)
EFU	A tornado was photographed and posted on social media. No damage occurred.						
EFU	W of Mitchellville	Polk	IA	41.663°N 93.3767°W	21:48–21:49	0.11 mi (0.18 km)	30 yd (27 m)
EFU	This tornado remained over rural farmland.						
EF1	NE of Spragueville	Jackson	IA	42.091°N 90.402°W	22:03–22:07	0.92 mi (1.48 km)	50 yd (46 m)
EF1	Some barns, trees and a large outbuilding were damaged by a landspout.						
EF0	NNE of Ely	Linn	IA	41.91°N 91.576°W	22:25–22:38	0.54 mi (0.87 km)	50 yd (46 m)
EF0	A weak landspout damaged a power pole, snapped large tree limbs and lifted some loose asphalt.						
EFU	S of Hale	Jones	IA	41.987°N 91.076°W	22:30–22:35	0.06 mi (0.097 km)	10 yd (9.1 m)
EFU	A nearly stationary landspout minorly damaged crops.						
EFU	S of Hale	Jones	IA	41.97°N 91.07°W	22:50–22:57	0.77 mi (1.24 km)	10 yd (9.1 m)
EFU	A landspout damaged crops.						
EF0	S of Meadow Grove	Madison	NE	41.97°N 97.73°W	23:11–23:16	1.81 mi (2.91 km)	50 yd (46 m)
EF0	A small shed was damaged, and a tree and powerline were broken.						
EF0	S of Booneville	Madison	IA	41.4829°N 93.8996°W	23:24–23:38	1.43 mi (2.30 km)	50 yd (46 m)
EF0	Minor tree damage occurred.						
EFU	NNE of Patterson	Madison	IA	41.4034°N 93.8734°W	23:49–23:51	0.23 mi (0.37 km)	30 yd (27 m)
EFU	A brief tornado was observed by a spotter as it remained in rural areas.						
EFU	W of Madison	Madison	NE	41.84°N 97.63°W	23:51–23:53	0.53 mi (0.85 km)	30 yd (27 m)
EFU	Multiple people saw a brief tornado over open farmland that did not cause any damage.						
EF3	Whitman to W of Tryon	Grant, Hooker, McPherson	NE	42.0867°N 101.5381°W	01:47–02:44	40.01 mi (64.39 km)	500 yd (460 m)
EF3	This long-tracked high-end EF3 tornado heavily damaged or destroyed homes and farm buildings on farmsteads. Trees, power poles, power lines, and outbuildings were also heavily damaged or destroyed. One person was injured.						

=== June 26 event ===
List of confirmed tornadoes – Wednesday, June 26, 2024
EF#	Location	County / Parish	State	Start Coord.	Time (UTC)	Path length	Max width
EFU	NE of Koosharem	Sevier	UT	38.52°N 111.86°W	22:30	unknown	unknown
EFU	This tornado had a picture taken of it and posted on social media.						
EFU	SW of Hagerman	Chaves	NM	33.104°N 104.346°W	23:12–23:21	0.87 mi (1.40 km)	20 yd (18 m)
EFU	A landspout passed nearby an RV park on the west side of Hagerman and did not cause any damage.						
EF0	E of Hagerman	Chaves	NM	33.0962°N 104.3139°W	23:21–23:36	1.85 mi (2.98 km)	20 yd (18 m)
EF0	A poorly constructed trailer home was destroyed.						
EF1	SW of Imperial-Enlow to Oakdale	Washington, Allegheny	PA	40.4269°N 80.306°W	23:26–23:38	6.84 mi (11.01 km)	100 yd (91 m)
EF1	Several large trees were snapped or uprooted.						
EF1	NNE of Wilmerding to S of Claridge	Allegheny, Westmoreland	PA	40.3894°N 79.808°W	23:57–00:11	11.54 mi (18.57 km)	300 yd (270 m)
EF1	Thousands of trees were uprooted, snapped, and damaged along the tornado's path. Roofs had minor damage, some utility poles were heavily damaged, and dugouts at a baseball field near an elementary school were destroyed.						
EF1	Southern Monroeville	Allegheny	PA	40.4°N 79.8°W	23:59–00:02	2.64 mi (4.25 km)	300 yd (270 m)
EF1	This brief tornado snapped or uprooted a large number of trees and removed siding from homes. Some trees fell onto powerlines, snapping a couple of poles.						
EF2	SW of Export to SW of New Alexandria	Westmoreland	PA	40.3955°N 79.6606°W	00:06–00:20	10.84 mi (17.45 km)	200 yd (180 m)
EF2	A low-end EF2 significantly damaged trees at two golf courses. The tornado intensified to a low-end EF2 as it descended down a steep hillside, snapping and uprooting dozens of trees. Roof and silo damage was observed along with an outcropping of mature trees where the vast majority had been snapped.						
EF0	E of Spraggs	Greene	PA	39.776°N 80.1306°W	00:27-00:29	0.25 mi (0.40 km)	65 yd (59 m)
EF0	Trees were snapped and minor roof damage occurred. A carry-on trailer was also tossed into a ditch before the tornado dissipated.						
EF0	WNW of Blairsville	Indiana	PA	40.4556°N 79.2949°W	00:30–00:31	0.32 mi (0.51 km)	30 yd (27 m)
EF0	Minor tree damage was observed.						
EF1	Cumberland, RI to western North Attleboro, MA	Providence (RI), Bristol (MA)	RI, MA	41.9053°N 71.4418°W	02:23–02:30	4.3 mi (6.9 km)	100 yd (91 m)
EF1	A number of large hardwood trees were uprooted, some of which fell onto homes and other structures in both Lincoln and Cumberland. Other trees were toppled and snapped well above the ground. The tornado continued to produce tree damage through Cumberland and then across the state line into North Attleboro where it continued to snap and uproot trees before lifting.						
EF1	SW Rehoboth	Bristol	MA	41.8018°N 71.2939°W	02:29–02:30	0.55 mi (0.89 km)	50 yd (46 m)
EF1	A brief tornado uprooted and snapped a large number of trees.						

=== June 27 event ===
List of confirmed tornadoes – Thursday, June 27, 2024
EF#	Location	County / Parish	State	Start Coord.	Time (UTC)	Path length	Max width
EF0	Melbourne	Brevard	FL	28.1239°N 80.652°W	21:56–22:00	1.1 mi (1.8 km)	75 yd (69 m)
EF0	A brief tornado damaged carports and the roofs, siding, and soffits of multiple homes in the Eau Gallie neighborhood of Melbourne. Several trees were partially or fully uprooted, large branches were snapped, and a few power poles were snapped.						
EFU	SSE of Trotters	Golden Valley	ND	47.21°N 103.82°W	22:38–22:41	0.57 mi (0.92 km)	50 yd (46 m)
EFU	This tornado occurred in an open field and impacted no structures.						
EF0	S of Lake Charles	Calcasieu	LA	30.1258°N 93.2162°W	23:26–23:27	0.11 mi (0.18 km)	10 yd (9.1 m)
EF0	A brief landspout tossed around wooden pallets and sheet metal behind an outbuilding. The flying debris damaged a generator building and three vehicles in the Lake Charles Regional Airport parking lot. One communication satellite and office co-op equipment was also damaged.						
EFU	S of South Heart	Stark	ND	46.77°N 103.02°W	00:38–00:40	0.54 mi (0.87 km)	50 yd (46 m)
EFU	This tornado remained over open fields.						
EF0	SW of Onaka	Faulk	SD	45.1561°N 99.5117°W	04:25–04:26	0.46 mi (0.74 km)	20 yd (18 m)
EF0	High-resolution satellite imagery confirmed a tornado in a field. No damage occurred.						

=== June 28 event ===
List of confirmed tornadoes – Friday, June 28, 2024
EF#	Location	County / Parish	State	Start Coord.	Time (UTC)	Path length	Max width
EF1	Eastern Jacksonville	Duval	FL	30.2866°N 81.5547°W	18:15–18:25	1.41 mi (2.27 km)	200 yd (180 m)
EF1	Powerlines were downed and several trees were snapped, including a tree uprooted onto a home. A pickup truck was flipped as well.						
EFU	SSW of Marne	Cass	IA	41.4176°N 95.1481°W	00:44–00:50	0.91 mi (1.46 km)	40 yd (37 m)
EFU	A tornado was observed by storm chasers over rural farmland.						
EF0	WSW of Atlantic	Cass	IA	41.3561°N 95.1251°W	00:55–01:08	2.44 mi (3.93 km)	50 yd (46 m)
EF0	This weak tornado impacted and caused minor damage to a few trees.						
EFU	SW of Miller	Lyon	KS	38.5978°N 96.0384°W	01:13–01:20	2.37 mi (3.81 km)	30 yd (27 m)
EFU	Several photos were taken of this tornado as it remained over open country. No damage occurred.						
EF0	S of Barclay	Osage	KS	38.5657°N 95.8826°W	01:39–01:41	1.24 mi (2.00 km)	30 yd (27 m)
EF0	Minor tree damage was observed.						
EFU	SW of Wiota	Cass	IA	41.3877°N 94.9168°W	01:40–01:43	0.4 mi (0.64 km)	30 yd (27 m)
EFU	A tornado remained over cropland.						
EFU	SSE of Wiota	Cass	IA	41.3867°N 94.8908°W	01:42–01:44	0.3 mi (0.48 km)	20 yd (18 m)
EFU	This tornado tracked over rural farmland. No damage occurred.						
EF0	NE of Olivet	Osage	KS	38.5009°N 95.7188°W	01:59–02:00	0.34 mi (0.55 km)	30 yd (27 m)
EF0	A weak tornado downed and damaged multiple trees, rolled an RV, and damaged a marina on the southeast corner of Melvern Lake.						

=== June 29 event ===
List of confirmed tornadoes – Saturday, June 29, 2024
EF#	Location	County / Parish	State	Start Coord.	Time (UTC)	Path length	Max width
EF0	NNW of Willard	Huron	OH	41.0802°N 82.7336°W	15:02–15:03	0.17 mi (0.27 km)	25 yd (23 m)
EF0	A security camera captured a brief tornado. Several tree limbs were twisted off of trees and it mainly remained over a corn field.						
EFU	SW of Yates Center	Woodson	KS	37.8369°N 95.7801°W	21:25–21:26	0.05 mi (0.080 km)	10 yd (9.1 m)
EFU	A storm chaser witnessed the entire lifespan of a landspout that remained over farmland. Some minor damage occurred to tree branches.						
EF0	SSE of Cheneyville, IL to NNW of Tab, IN	Vermilion (IL), Warren (IN)	IL, IN	40.45°N 87.57°W	23:15–23:30	4.76 mi (7.66 km)	30 yd (27 m)
EF0	A storm chaser witnessed the entire lifespan of a landspout that remained over farmland. Some minor damage occurred to tree branches.						

=== June 30 event ===
List of confirmed tornadoes – Sunday, June 30, 2024
EF#	Location	County / Parish	State	Start Coord.	Time (UTC)	Path length	Max width
EFU	NW of Bonita Springs	Lee	FL	26.3611°N 81.8455°W	23:16–23:17	0.03 mi (0.048 km)	15 yd (14 m)
EFU	A waterspout quickly became a tornado as it passed over an uninhabited island in Estero Bay.						

== July ==
Confirmed tornadoes by Enhanced Fujita rating
EFU	EF0	EF1	EF2	EF3	EF4	EF5	Total
38	73	94	13	1	0	0	219

=== July 1 event ===
List of confirmed tornadoes – Monday, July 1, 2024
EF#	Location	County / Parish	State	Start Coord.	Time (UTC)	Path length	Max width
EFU	NNE of Beaver City	Furnas	NE	40.1885°N 99.8145°W	22:51	0.01 mi (0.016 km)	10 yd (9.1 m)
EFU	A brief tornado was reported by storm chasers.						
EFU	SSE of Axtell	Kearney	NE	40.435°N 99.0824°W	00:07	0.01 mi (0.016 km)	10 yd (9.1 m)
EFU	A brief tornado was reported by storm chasers and an off-duty NWS employee.						
EF0	SW of Dorchester	Saline	NE	40.604°N 97.182°W	03:46–03:47	0.26 mi (0.42 km)	80 yd (73 m)
EF0	A narrow area, less than 100 yards across with several damaged trees and large limbs was documented along N-15. Roads off of the highway near this location were impassable. This damage lines up perfectly with tight radar indicated rotation and with a funnel observation.						
EF1	SW of Lincoln	Lancaster	NE	40.71°N 96.76°W	04:50–04:54	2.28 mi (3.67 km)	300 yd (270 m)
EF1	This tornado touched down and quickly produced EF1 damage as it moved northeast. Extensive tree damage was noted to several acreages along the path. A horse boarding facility sustained significant damage where six small stable barns were totaled. Another horse farm was hit as well. Half of an outbuilding was destroyed as well as a large silo. The tornado continued east producing large tree damage before lifting.						

=== July 2 event ===
List of confirmed tornadoes – Tuesday, July 2, 2024
EF#	Location	County / Parish	State	Start Coord.	Time (UTC)	Path length	Max width
EF1	Southeastern Tucson	Pima	AZ	32.1325°N 110.8381°W	05:40–05:50	3.25 mi (5.23 km)	150 yd (140 m)
EF1	This brief tornado downed several trees, including a few large trees, and inflicted a bit of roof damage where tiles were blown off. A large shipping container was also moved and flipped on its side, damaging a chain-link fence.						

=== July 3 event ===
List of confirmed tornadoes – Wednesday, July 3, 2024
EF#	Location	County / Parish	State	Start Coord.	Time (UTC)	Path length	Max width
EFU	W of Gurley	Cheyenne	NE	41.32°N 103.13°W	19:48	0.01 mi (0.016 km)	10 yd (9.1 m)
EFU	A brief tornado occurred and was reported by a local fire chief.						
EFU	S of Arnold	Custer	NE	41.26°N 100.2°W	23:35	0.01 mi (0.016 km)	10 yd (9.1 m)
EFU	This weak tornado did not cause any known damage.						
EF0	W of Branson West	Stone	MO	36.71°N 93.46°W	00:59–01:01	1.05 mi (1.69 km)	150 yd (140 m)
EF0	Numerous trees were snapped or uprooted.						

=== July 4 event ===
List of confirmed tornadoes – Thursday, July 4, 2024
EF#	Location	County / Parish	State	Start Coord.	Time (UTC)	Path length	Max width
EF0	SW of Crandall	Harrison	IN	38.2731°N 86.1122°W	17:05–17:06	0.97 mi (1.56 km)	125 yd (114 m)
EF0	This tornado first damaged the shingles of a two story home and destroyed an outbuilding on the property. Further east, multiple trees were topped and twisted. Tree damage continued, including one falling on and destroying a vehicle. Multiple power lines were downed along with a power pole before the tornado lifted.						
EFU	SE of Chaseley	Wells	ND	47.4044°N 99.7541°W	17:12–17:14	0.36 mi (0.58 km)	50 yd (46 m)
EFU	A tornado touched down in an open field, impacting no structures.						
EF1	Western Louisville	Jefferson	KY	38.2345°N 85.8019°W	17:27–17:28	0.51 mi (0.82 km)	170 yd (160 m)
EF1	A brief tornado damaged the shingles and windows on a church, downed several tree branches, and uprooted a few trees. Some power poles were pulled down and the tornado peeled back the roof of a residence. Isolated tree damage occurred further down the path before the tornado lifted.						
EFU	SE of Melvin	Ford	IL	40.5297°N 88.2202°W	18:37–18:51	1.3 mi (2.1 km)	30 yd (27 m)
EFU	An emergency manager recorded and photographed a landspout in an open field.						
EFU	W of Carlsbad	Eddy	NM	32.4°N 104.26°W	21:01–21:06	unknown	unknown
EFU	A brief landspout was reported.						
EF0	ESE of De Graff	Logan	OH	40.2923°N 83.8646°W	00:44–00:45	0.18 mi (0.29 km)	50 yd (46 m)
EF0	A very brief and weak tornado minorly damaged trees.						

=== July 5 event ===
List of confirmed tornadoes – Friday, July 5, 2024
EF#	Location	County / Parish	State	Start Coord.	Time (UTC)	Path length	Max width
EF0	NNW of Medford	Taylor	WI	45.17°N 90.37°W	19:40–19:42	1 mi (1.6 km)	40 yd (37 m)
EF0	Sporadic, light tree damage occurred from a weak tornado.						
EF0	NNW of Redman	Huron	MI	43.95°N 82.84°W	20:38–20:40	0.5 mi (0.80 km)	25 yd (23 m)
EF0	A tornado damaged some trees and crops.						
EF1	S of Lake George to SE of Harrison	Clare	MI	43.95°N 84.95°W	20:57–21:31	12.11 mi (19.49 km)	75 yd (69 m)
EF1	This tornado touched down west of George Lake and flipped boats on the lake while it crossed over it. The tornado continued to track due east downing hundreds of trees, some of which fell onto homes, before it lifted.						
EFU	NNE of Las Vegas	San Miguel	NM	35.73°N 105.16°W	21:50–21:51	0.02 mi (0.032 km)	10 yd (9.1 m)
EFU	A brief and ragged tornado occurred in rural country.						

=== July 6 event ===
List of confirmed tornadoes – Saturday, July 6, 2024
EF#	Location	County / Parish	State	Start Coord.	Time (UTC)	Path length	Max width
EFU	W of Achilles	Rawlins	KS	39.7335°N 100.9487°W	19:02–19:08	3.31 mi (5.33 km)	75 yd (69 m)
EFU	Multiple reports of a tornado that remained over open fields.						
EF1	Northern Minden	Kearney	NE	40.512°N 98.9515°W	20:48–20:52	1.08 mi (1.74 km)	200 yd (180 m)
EF1	A tornado touched down near a golf course and moved southeast through into town, causing minor tree damage. The tornado then intensified on the outskirts of Minden, damaging metal buildings and overturning pivots in a cornfield.						
EF1	S of Norman	Kearney	NE	40.4882°N 98.8401°W	21:03–21:09	4.29 mi (6.90 km)	50 yd (46 m)
EF1	A small tornado touched down near a farmstead causing tree limb damage to a house, snapping power poles, overturning pivots, and carrying a grain bin over 500 yd (460 m) before lifting southeast of Norman.						
EF0	SE of Roseland	Adams	NE	40.4647°N 98.5494°W	21:36–21:40	2.36 mi (3.80 km)	50 yd (46 m)
EF0	This high-end EF0 tornado developed and tracked southeast through farm fields, overturning pivots and damaging buildings at a farmstead before dissipating. At the farmstead, part of a roof was removed, several outbuildings were destroyed, trees were significantly damaged, and power poles were tilted. This tornado also occurred within a broader area of damaging wind gusts.						
EF0	W of Inland	Adams	NE	40.5866°N 98.2895°W	21:52–21:54	0.34 mi (0.55 km)	100 yd (91 m)
EF0	A multi-vortex, high-end EF0 tornado touched down in a cornfield east of Hastings, causing minor tree damage, overturning a pivot, and then curving back north before dissipating.						
EF1	WNW of Belden	Mountrail	ND	48.18°N 102.42°W	22:06–22:13	1.22 mi (1.96 km)	75 yd (69 m)
EF1	This tornado began on a farmstead, overturning a camper and destroying and tearing the roof off of a small, metal grain bin. The tornado then tracked over open fields before lifting.						
EF1	SSE of Sutton	Clay, Fillmore	NE	40.5544°N 97.8303°W	22:32–22:35	1.9 mi (3.1 km)	400 yd (370 m)
EF1	A high-end EF1 tornado that was embedded in a QLCS, caused damage to power poles, trees, grain bins, farm implements, and minor siding damage to a house before lifting northeast of the impacted farmstead.						

=== July 7 event ===
List of confirmed tornadoes – Sunday, July 7, 2024
EF#	Location	County / Parish	State	Start Coord.	Time (UTC)	Path length	Max width
EF0	NNW of Tower	St. Louis	MN	47.85°N 92.3°W	19:17–19:22	1.95 mi (3.14 km)	30 yd (27 m)
EF0	A waterspout crossed Lake Vermilion, possibly crossing over a few islands.						

=== July 8 event ===
List of confirmed tornadoes – Monday, July 8, 2024
EF#	Location	County / Parish	State	Start Coord.	Time (UTC)	Path length	Max width
EF1	SW of Jamaica Beach	Galveston	TX	29.1273°N 95.0588°W	06:57–06:59	1.1 mi (1.8 km)	100 yd (91 m)
EF1	A waterspout over the Gulf of Mexico moved onshore, damaging power poles and inflicting significant damage to a home.						
EF2	Western Jasper	Jasper	TX	30.8611°N 94.0058°W	16:01–16:16	8.63 mi (13.89 km)	400 yd (370 m)
EF2	This strong, low-end EF2 tornado tracked through the west side of Jasper. Many power poles and trees were snapped or uprooted and numerous homes and outbuildings were heavily damaged. One person was injured.						
EF1	W of Alto	Cherokee	TX	31.6498°N 95.0968°W	17:04–17:07	1.13 mi (1.82 km)	105 yd (96 m)
EF1	A tornado peeled the metal roof off of a home and snapped or uprooted numerous trees.						
EF1	NNE of Milam	Sabine	TX	31.5147°N 93.7981°W	17:39–17:44	2.84 mi (4.57 km)	440 yd (400 m)
EF1	This high-end EF1 tornado began as a waterspout over Patroon Creek before briefly moving onshore at an RV park on the Holly Park Marina. A couple of RVs were destroyed after being overturned and tossed, a few boats were thrown, a boat dock was ruined, and a small fish cleaning station was destroyed. After crossing over the creek, the tornado snapped or uprooted numerous trees. The tornado then moved into the Toledo Bend Reservoir before dissipating.						
EF1	Appleby to NW of Mahl	Nacogdoches	TX	31.7087°N 94.5787°W	17:40–17:49	8.13 mi (13.08 km)	800 yd (730 m)
EF1	This high-end EF1 tornado collapsed part of the roof of an outbuilding, partially unroofed two homes, and snapped or uprooted numerous trees.						
EF0	NNW of Minden to S of Henderson	Rusk	TX	32.0483°N 94.7371°W	18:06–18:13	3.73 mi (6.00 km)	390 yd (360 m)
EF0	Trees were uprooted and tree limbs were snapped by this high-end EF0 tornado.						
EF1	NW of Huxley to SSE of Joaquin	Shelby	TX	31.821°N 93.9686°W	18:10–18:19	6.67 mi (10.73 km)	375 yd (343 m)
EF1	Mainly tree and timber damage occurred. Most of the track was determined via high-resolution satellite imagery and aerial imagery since most of the area was inaccessible to ground surveys.						
EF2	W of Converse to WSW of South Mansfield	Sabine, DeSoto	LA	31.7808°N 93.714°W	18:15–18:38	16.32 mi (26.26 km)	950 yd (870 m)
EF2	This large EF2 tornado struck a church property, heavily damaging every building there. A mobile home suffered minor roof damage, wooden power poles were snapped, and trees were snapped or uprooted as well.						
EF1	Timpson	Shelby	TX	31.9062°N 94.3975°W	18:15–18:18	2.56 mi (4.12 km)	495 yd (453 m)
EF1	This high-end EF1 tornado touched down in the center of Timpson, ripping almost half the roof off a business, destroying an RV, and snapping or uprooting numerous trees. The tornado then moved northwestward out of the town, snapping several trees before dissipating.						
EF2	N of Belmont to Pleasant Hill to ENE of Mansfield	Sabine, DeSoto	LA	31.742°N 93.5094°W	18:33–19:18	24.96 mi (40.17 km)	900 yd (820 m)
EF2	This large, long-tracked tornado first traveled north along LA 175, producing sporadic tree damage before moving through Pleasant Hill, snapping or uprooting numerous trees and ripping metal roof panels off of a structure. Past Pleasant Hill, two single-wide manufactured homes being used as offices at a refinery were rolled. As the tornado reached LA 346, it ripped large portions of roofs off of two homes and obliterated a mobile home. Many trees were snapped or uprooted, including some that fell on and damaged homes and vehicles. The tornado then continued generally northward, damaging, snapping, or uprooting trees before dissipating.						
EF1	Northern Pelican to NNE of Benson	DeSoto	LA	31.8829°N 93.5856°W	18:39–18:46	3.63 mi (5.84 km)	100 yd (91 m)
EF1	This low-end EF1 tornado snapped or uprooted trees.						
EF1	E of Longstreet, LA to SW of Bethany, LA and TX to NW of Panola, TX	DeSoto (LA), Caddo (LA), Panola (TX), Harrison (TX)	LA, TX	32.0696°N 93.8783°W	18:47–19:36	27.51 mi (44.27 km)	850 yd (780 m)
EF1	This long-tracked tornado snapped or uprooted dozens of trees and downed power poles and powerlines. As the tornado passed close to Keithville, it flipped a single-wide mobile home, before the tornado reached peak intensity in Bethany, causing extensive, very high-end EF1 damage. Some structures were damaged by fallen trees as well. One person was injured in the flipped mobile home, while another was trapped but unscathed.						
EFU	WSW of Alfalfa Center	Mississippi	MO	36.9597°N 89.2249°W	18:53–18:55	0.73 mi (1.17 km)	25 yd (23 m)
EFU	Multiple videos were taken of a landspout just southeast of an I-57 weigh station. No damage occurred.						
EF0	S of Lakeport	Rusk, Gregg	TX	32.3506°N 94.694°W	19:08–19:10	3.13 mi (5.04 km)	270 yd (250 m)
EF0	This high-end EF0 tornado initially damaged trees before and after crossing Lake Cherokee. After causing very sporadic tree damage, the tornado struck the East Texas Regional Airport, where several hangars had their large metal doors knocked down or twisted and some side paneling ripped off as well. Two stop signs were twisted from their base, although this damage was unratable. The tornado then caused some additional tree damage before dissipating.						
EF2	W of Hall Summit to Eastwood to W of Plain Dealing	Red River, Bossier	LA	32.2368°N 93.4359°W	19:15–20:50	53.38 mi (85.91 km)	1,000 yd (910 m)
EF2	2 deaths – See section on this tornado – One person was injured.						
EFU	E of Keachie	DeSoto	LA	32.14°N 93.76°W	19:15–19:26	4.2 mi (6.8 km)	40 yd (37 m)
EFU	High-resolution satellite imagery uncovered a weak path of downed trees through a forested area. A TDS was observed on the nearby radar as well.						
EF1	NE of Tatum to S of Hallsville	Panola, Rusk, Harrison	TX	32.3541°N 94.4591°W	19:19–19:34	9.79 mi (15.76 km)	215 yd (197 m)
EF1	This high-end EF1 tornado snapped or uprooted dozens of trees. Some homes suffered minor siding damage or metal roofing damage as well.						
EFU	WNW of Combes	Cameron	TX	26.26°N 97.75°W	19:41	0.5 mi (0.80 km)	20 yd (18 m)
EFU	A landspout was photographed.						
EF1	E of Scottsville to W of Karnack	Harrison	TX	32.5473°N 94.1397°W	19:46–20:04	9.72 mi (15.64 km)	270 yd (250 m)
EF1	A tornado snapped and uprooted trees before continuing into an inaccessible area.						
EFU	S of Powhatan	Natchitoches	LA	31.8281°N 93.1885°W	19:51–19:53	2.27 mi (3.65 km)	75 yd (69 m)
EFU	A storm chaser captured video of a tornado over an open field. No damage was found.						
EF0	E of Gloster	DeSoto	LA	32.1961°N 93.7719°W	19:57–19:58	0.39 mi (0.63 km)	200 yd (180 m)
EF0	Large tree limbs were downed.						
EF1	Shelbyville to SE of Tenaha	Shelby	TX	31.751°N 94.0513°W	20:18–20:33	11.35 mi (18.27 km)	650 yd (590 m)
EF1	Homes suffered roof damage, power lines were downed, and trees were snapped or uprooted by this high-end EF1 tornado. Much of the track was inaccessible due to the lack of an adequate road network.						
EF1	S of Huxley	Sabine, Shelby	TX	31.58°N 93.8377°W	20:27–20:35	4.99 mi (8.03 km)	650 yd (590 m)
EF1	This high-end EF1 tornado moved along the western shoreline of the Toledo Bend Reservoir, snapping or uprooting dozens of trees, including some that blocked roads. Smaller buildings at a camp were also damaged.						
EF1	WSW of Bienville to E of Sparta	Bienville	LA	32.3227°N 93.0327°W	20:30–20:35	3.31 mi (5.33 km)	300 yd (270 m)
EF1	This tornado formed as the previous tornado was dissipating. Numerous trees were snapped.						
EF1	W of Joaquin to NNE of Tenaha	Shelby, Panola	TX	31.9631°N 94.1415°W	20:41–20:48	5.1 mi (8.2 km)	600 yd (550 m)
EF1	Many trees were snapped or uprooted.						
EF1	W of Noble	Sabine	LA	31.6631°N 93.7807°W	20:42–20:44	1.28 mi (2.06 km)	400 yd (370 m)
EF1	A substantial tree damage signature was noted along the eastern shore of the Toledo Bend Reservoir. Since the tornado came off the water, there was no way to determine if the track was longer than analyzed. Additionally, the entire path of the tornado was confirmed via high resolution satellite data and a radar tornadic debris signature since the area was inaccessible to ground surveys.						
EF1	WSW of Plain Dealing	Bossier	LA	32.8703°N 93.7585°W	20:46–20:52	2.68 mi (4.31 km)	600 yd (550 m)
EF1	This tornado formed as the long-track EF1 Benton tornado was dissipating and was the second one produced by the Eastwood supercell. Numerous trees were snapped.						
EFU	W of Mount Lebanon to E of Dubberly	Bienville, Webster	LA	32.5°N 93.14°W	20:55–21:01	4.2 mi (6.8 km)	765 yd (700 m)
EFU	A TDS was observed on the nearby radar and high-resolution satellite imagery showed a stout path of downed trees.						
EF2	NE of Huxley	Sabine	LA	31.8379°N 93.8362°W	20:59–21:02	1.42 mi (2.29 km)	164 yd (150 m)
EF2	After initially snapping and uprooting countless trees, this strong tornado reached low-end EF2 intensity at an intersection west of Union Springs. It removed most of the roof off a house and blew it into neighboring lawns with a 2x4 from the roof piercing another home. Other homes and cars in the area were damaged by snapped or uprooted trees. The tornado then continued to snap and uproot trees as it moved north-northwestward before dissipating. One person was injured.						
EF0	E of Ida	Bossier	LA	32.9785°N 93.795°W	21:00–21:03	1.96 mi (3.15 km)	50 yd (46 m)
EF0	Some trees were uprooted, and large limbs were snapped. This was the third tornado produced by the Eastwood supercell.						
EF1	NE of Minden	Webster	LA	32.6594°N 93.2067°W	21:01–21:03	1.06 mi (1.71 km)	479 yd (438 m)
EF1	A number of large trees were snapped and uprooted, one of which fell on a home.						
EF1	E of Ida, LA to W of Gin City, AR	Bossier (LA), Lafayette (AR)	LA, AR	33.0044°N 93.7893°W	21:03–21:16	7.06 mi (11.36 km)	300 yd (270 m)
EF1	In Louisiana, this multi-vortex tornado snapped trees and power poles. In Arkansas, the tornado damaged six power poles, including two that were snapped, and laid out a 50 yd-wide (46 m) section of corn. This was the fourth tornado produced by the Eastwood supercell.						
EF1	E of Hughes Springs	Cass	TX	32.9881°N 94.5301°W	21:08–21:16	4.18 mi (6.73 km)	325 yd (297 m)
EF1	A wooden power pole was snapped near its base. Trees were snapped or uprooted as well.						
EF1	E of Converse to NNE of Benson	Sabine, DeSoto	LA	31.7864°N 93.6645°W	21:10–21:26	9.71 mi (15.63 km)	500 yd (460 m)
EF1	Many trees were snapped or uprooted, including some that fell on and damaged structures. Power lines were also downed.						
EF0	WSW of Gin City	Lafayette	AR	33.0662°N 93.8104°W	21:11–21:16	0.98 mi (1.58 km)	25 yd (23 m)
EF0	This was a satellite tornado to the EF1 Gin City tornado. Some large tree limbs were downed. This was the fifth tornado produced by the Eastwood supercell.						
EF1	NE of Minden	Webster	LA	32.6844°N 93.1908°W	21:11–21:14	1.53 mi (2.46 km)	345 yd (315 m)
EF1	Several trees were snapped or uprooted in a convergent pattern.						
EF1	NE of Doddridge to S of Fouke	Miller	AR	33.1427°N 93.8521°W	21:19–21:34	5.44 mi (8.75 km)	95 yd (87 m)
EF1	This erratic tornado removed a few metal panels from a metal barn and snapped or uprooted trees. This was the sixth tornado produced by the Eastwood supercell.						
EF1	W of South Mansfield to S of Grand Cane	DeSoto	LA	32.017°N 93.7865°W	21:25–21:28	2.54 mi (4.09 km)	67 yd (61 m)
EF1	This low-end EF1 tornado damaged trees, including some that were snapped or uprooted.						
EF1	Dykesville to ENE of Shongaloo	Claiborne, Webster	LA	32.9035°N 93.2335°W	21:37–21:44	4.76 mi (7.66 km)	400 yd (370 m)
EF1	This high-end EF1 tornado snapped or uprooted dozens of trees and downed a few power lines.						
EF1	NE of Shongaloo	Webster	LA	32.9457°N 93.2575°W	21:42–21:48	3.93 mi (6.32 km)	375 yd (343 m)
EF1	This tornado touched down as the Dykesville EF1 tornado dissipated and damaged trees.						
EF0	NNE of Mansfield	DeSoto	LA	32.0702°N 93.6522°W	21:44–21:50	3.41 mi (5.49 km)	250 yd (230 m)
EF0	Large tree limbs were downed.						
EF1	NW of Fouke to SE of Texarkana	Miller	AR	33.2914°N 93.9485°W	21:45–21:49	2.06 mi (3.32 km)	50 yd (46 m)
EF1	Trees were snapped and large limbs were downed. This was the seventh tornado produced by the Eastwood supercell.						
EF1	NNE of Shongaloo, LA to SE of Taylor, AR	Webster (LA), Columbia (AR)	LA, AR	32.9748°N 93.2801°W	21:48–21:59	6.5 mi (10.5 km)	300 yd (270 m)
EF1	This tornado touched down as the second Shongaloo EF1 tornado dissipated. In Louisiana, trees were snapped or uprooted, including one tree that fell on a vehicle. A shed was damaged and an old barn had some tin peeled off. The tornado continued to snap or uproot trees after crossing into Arkansas before dissipating.						
EF1	Texarkana	Bowie	TX	33.4357°N 94.0711°W	22:17–22:19	0.21 mi (0.34 km)	240 yd (220 m)
EF1	A tornado ripped roofing off two homes and an older retail building. Additional structures sustained damage from damaged trees. This was the eighth and final tornado produced by the Eastwood supercell.						
EF1	E of Keithville	Caddo	LA	32.3245°N 93.7169°W	22:21–22:25	1.86 mi (2.99 km)	150 yd (140 m)
EF1	Homes suffered minor shingle damage, fences were downed, the metal roof off of a guard station was removed, and many trees were downed.						
EF1	N of Campti to WNW of Creston	Natchitoches	LA	31.9245°N 93.1147°W	23:02–23:11	5.7 mi (9.2 km)	100 yd (91 m)
EF1	Damage was limited to trees.						
EF1	ESE of Sparkman (1st tornado)	Dallas	AR	33.867°N 92.7664°W	23:46–23:55	3.2 mi (5.1 km)	75 yd (69 m)
EF1	This low-end EF1 tornado was a twin to the tornado below. It severely damaged the awning of a carport that was attached to a manufactured home and damaged trees.						
EF1	ESE of Sparkman (2nd tornado)	Dallas	AR	33.8661°N 92.7981°W	23:51–23:56	2.4 mi (3.9 km)	75 yd (69 m)
EF1	This low-end EF1 tornado was a twin to the tornado above. Damage was limited to trees.						
EF2	W of Bernice	Union	LA	32.8145°N 92.7119°W	23:59–00:04	3.21 mi (5.17 km)	750 yd (690 m)
EF2	This strong, low-end EF2 tornado snapped or uprooted hundreds of trees and downed a number of power poles.						
EF2	NE of Spearsville	Union	LA	32.9628°N 92.4918°W	00:42–00:44	1.49 mi (2.40 km)	175 yd (160 m)
EF2	This brief but strong tornado struck a home which was unroofed and had multiple exterior walls knocked down. Two pickup trucks were rolled or thrown into the yard and many trees around the home were damaged as well.						
EF1	NNW of Stephens	Ouachita, Nevada	AR	33.4911°N 93.0834°W	01:00–01:05	2.82 mi (4.54 km)	50 yd (46 m)
EF1	This low-end EF1 tornado damaged a couple of outbuildings and peeled metal roofing off of a large barn. Long swaths of trees were uprooted as well. The survey for this tornado was conducted through geotagged drone imagery from the Camden Fire Department.						
EF1	E of Grapevine	Jefferson	AR	34.1127°N 92.1825°W	03:28–03:35	3.2 mi (5.1 km)	75 yd (69 m)
EF1	This low-end EF1 tornado ripped some metal panels off of a few chicken houses and damaged trees.						
EF0	E of White Hall to Pastoria	Jefferson	AR	34.2732°N 92.0288°W	03:49–03:59	5.8 mi (9.3 km)	75 yd (69 m)
EF0	This weak tornado only caused minor tree damage.						

=== July 9 event ===
List of confirmed tornadoes – Tuesday, July 9, 2024
EF#	Location	County / Parish	State	Start Coord.	Time (UTC)	Path length	Max width
EF1	NW of West	Holmes	MS	33.226°N 89.8325°W	11:08–11:11	0.73 mi (1.17 km)	85 yd (78 m)
EF1	This brief tornado uprooted several trees and broke large tree limbs.						
EF0	NNE of Dubre	Cumberland, Metcalfe	KY	36.8524°N 85.545°W	19:00–19:01	0.9 mi (1.4 km)	200 yd (180 m)
EF0	This high-end EF0 tornado snapped tree limbs and uprooted trees.						
EFU	NW of Ruidoso	Lincoln	NM	33.36°N 105.7068°W	19:06–19:08	0.55 mi (0.89 km)	30 yd (27 m)
EFU	An emergency manager recorded a landspout over open land.						
EF1	N of Sturgis to SW of Morganfield	Union	KY	37.602°N 88.01°W	20:26–20:34	3.26 mi (5.25 km)	150 yd (140 m)
EF1	Two homes suffered roof damage, corn was leveled, and trees were snapped or uprooted from this high-end EF1 tornado.						
EF1	W of Morganfield to W of Uniontown	Union	KY	37.683°N 87.975°W	20:40–20:52	6.33 mi (10.19 km)	150 yd (140 m)
EF1	Corn was flattened and trees were snapped or uprooted.						
EF3	Eastern Mount Vernon to E of Solitude	Posey	IN	37.93°N 87.869°W	21:18–21:28	5.84 mi (9.40 km)	300 yd (270 m)
EF3	This tornado touched down just north of the Ohio River causing minor tree and crop damage before quickly strengthening to low-end EF3 intensity and striking a Kenco facility on the east side of Mt. Vernon. The structure had half of its roof removed along with large sections of its outer walls collapsed. Just to the north of there, the tornado damaged power poles, overturned semitrailers, and derailed several train cars. The tornado then continued northward, heavily damaging a mobile home, two homes, outbuildings, and snapping or uprooting trees before dissipating.						
EF1	NNE of Solitude	Posey	IN	38.042°N 87.863°W	21:32–21:39	3.33 mi (5.36 km)	300 yd (270 m)
EF1	This high-end EF1 tornado bent a power pole and snapped or uprooted trees.						
EF1	NW of Buckskin	Gibson	IN	38.2695°N 87.4739°W	16:48–16:49	0.42 mi (0.68 km)	40 yd (37 m)
EF1	A detached garage was destroyed and a residence had about half its roof removed. Two wooden power poles were left leaning and corn was damage in fields.						
EF2	N of Poseyville to N of Johnson	Posey, Gibson	IN	38.18°N 87.786°W	21:51–22:14	8.4 mi (13.5 km)	400 yd (370 m)
EF2	This strong tornado heavily damaged or destroyed mobile homes, outbuildings, crops, and snapped power poles and tree limbs.						
EF1	W of Patoka	Gibson	IN	38.406°N 87.605°W	22:50–22:52	1.04 mi (1.67 km)	25 yd (23 m)
EF1	This tornado leaned a power pole, snapped large tree limbs, and damaged crops.						
EF0	NW of Shoals to NNE of Loogootee	Martin	IN	38.7084°N 86.8399°W	23:21–23:24	1.77 mi (2.85 km)	20 yd (18 m)
EF0	A small, skipping high-end EF0 tornado downed large tree limbs and small trees.						
EFU	E of Burns City	Martin	IN	38.79°N 86.83°W	23:33–23:38	2.3 mi (3.7 km)	800 yd (730 m)
EFU	High-resolution satellite imagery showed a short path of uprooted trees. A TDS was observed on the nearby radar as well.						

=== July 10 event ===
List of confirmed tornadoes – Wednesday, July 10, 2024
EF#	Location	County / Parish	State	Start Coord.	Time (UTC)	Path length	Max width
EF1	NE of Arkwright to SE of Forestville	Chautauqua	NY	42.4187°N 79.1955°W	16:06–16:14	3.0 mi (4.8 km)	150 yd (140 m)
EF1	Many structures, including homes, suffered varying degrees of roof damage from this high-end EF1 tornado, including some that had their roofs removed and exterior walls knocked down. Many trees were snapped or uprooted as well.						
EF2	SE of Eden	Erie	NY	42.6233°N 78.8745°W	16:40–16:46	4.22 mi (6.79 km)	300 yd (270 m)
EF2	This strong tornado initially damaged multiple buildings, snapped tree limbs, and uprooted shallow trees. After damaging the roof of another structure, the tornado intensified to low-end EF2 strength, destroying multiple farm buildings. From there the tornado, slightly weakened snapping trees at high-end EF1 intensity before abruptly dissipating.						
EF1	N of West Falls to Griffins Mills	Erie	NY	42.7118°N 78.6836°W	16:59–17:06	2.8 mi (4.5 km)	400 yd (370 m)
EF1	This high-end EF1 tornado snapped or uprooted numerous trees. Just before lifting, it struck a newly built horse barn, ripping off a portion of its roof and blowing out windows.						
EF0	NE of Darien	Genesee	NY	42.9344°N 78.3126°W	17:42–17:46	1 mi (1.6 km)	50 yd (46 m)
EF0	Video evidence of a brief tornado was sent in by storm spotters. Damage was generally limited to mangled tree limbs.						
EF1	N of Redfield	Oswego	NY	43.5865°N 75.8484°W	18:23–18:28	2.2 mi (3.5 km)	50 yd (46 m)
EF1	Trees were damaged, including some that were downed.						
EFU	SSW of Fair Haven	Wayne	NY	43.2929°N 76.7271°W	19:09	0.1 mi (0.16 km)	25 yd (23 m)
EFU	A brief tornado affected vehicular traffic on NY 104A, which is not a damage indicator. Surveys are ongoing to determine if the tornado caused any tree or structural damage.						
EF0	E of Forestport	Oneida	NY	43.45°N 75.16°W	21:59–22:01	0.6 mi (0.97 km)	75 yd (69 m)
EF0	Trees were snapped or uprooted.						

=== July 12 event ===
List of confirmed tornadoes – Friday, July 12, 2024
EF#	Location	County / Parish	State	Start Coord.	Time (UTC)	Path length	Max width
EFU	N of Dickinson	Dunn	ND	47.1°N 102.78°W	20:10–20:14	1 mi (1.6 km)	75 yd (69 m)
EFU	A tornado occurred over open fields and impacted no structures.						
EFU	N of Otis	Washington	CO	40.3173°N 102.9614°W	22:02–22:05	0.59 mi (0.95 km)	10 yd (9.1 m)
EFU	This landspout remained over open land.						
EF0	NW of Larslan	Valley	MT	48.64°N 106.38°W	01:10–01:15	1 mi (1.6 km)	25 yd (23 m)
EF0	A weak tornado damaged multiple farm buildings, including one of which has a roof completely blown off and some walls knocked down. A hay bale was also blown a large distance.						
EF0	NW of Larslan	Valley	MT	48.63°N 106.31°W	01:25–01:30	2 mi (3.2 km)	25 yd (23 m)
EF0	Power poles and a manmade windbreak were damaged.						
EF0	E of Larslan	Valley	MT	48.56°N 106.03°W	02:00–02:05	3 mi (4.8 km)	25 yd (23 m)
EF0	A tornado was recorded and posted on social media.						

=== July 13 event ===
List of confirmed tornadoes – Saturday, July 13, 2024
EF#	Location	County / Parish	State	Start Coord.	Time (UTC)	Path length	Max width
EFU	NW of Moland	Rice	MN	44.2627°N 93.1389°W	21:59–22:04	0.5 mi (0.80 km)	20 yd (18 m)
EFU	A storm chaser witnessed a brief tornado.						
EF1	SW of Colfax to NNW of Barney	Richland	ND	46.42°N 97.05°W	00:15–00:45	4.5 mi (7.2 km)	80 yd (73 m)
EF1	This long-lived multi-vortex high-end EF1 tornado moved over rural open terrain, snapping a few trees.						

=== July 14 event ===
List of confirmed tornadoes – Sunday, July 14, 2024
EF#	Location	County / Parish	State	Start Coord.	Time (UTC)	Path length	Max width
EF0	S of Esmond	Ogle, DeKalb	IL	42.0304°N 88.95°W	01:58–02:02	3.04 mi (4.89 km)	100 yd (91 m)
EF0	An outbuilding was destroyed and crops and trees were damaged.						
EF1	SSW of Virgil to Elburn to W of Geneva	Kane	IL	41.9191°N 88.5396°W	02:28–02:40	9 mi (14 km)	150 yd (140 m)
EF1	This tornado initially started by causing crop damage visible in satellite imagery. It moved southeast and then east through Elburn, downing trees and damaging several farm buildings and houses. As the tornado turned east-northeast, it reached peak intensity by destroying a metal farm building at an equestrian center and driving wooden boards into the ground. Additional tree damage occurred before the tornado ended south of IL 38.						
EF0	Western St. Charles	Kane	IL	41.9041°N 88.3519°W	02:43–02:44	0.8 mi (1.3 km)	200 yd (180 m)
EF0	This brief tornado began just north of IL 38. It moved southeast, damaging the roof of a self-storage building, a greenhouse, and tossing shopping cart corrals at a grocery store. A light pole was knocked down, and several trees were snapped or uprooted before the tornado ended.						
EF0	Northwestern La Grange to Cicero	Cook	IL	41.8151°N 87.8858°W	03:23–03:33	7.4 mi (11.9 km)	250 yd (230 m)
EF0	A weak tornado tracked through the western suburbs of Chicago, including La Grange, Brookfield, Riverside, Berwyn and Cicero. Damage was entirely confined to trees.						
EF0	Southern Chicago (1st tornado)	Cook	IL	41.79°N 87.7425°W	03:33–03:43	8 mi (13 km)	300 yd (270 m)
EF0	This high-end EF0 tornado touched down just east of Midway International Airport, moving through the South Side neighborhoods of West Elsdon, Gage Park, New City and Fuller Park. The damage in these neighborhoods was primarily limited to trees, but some minor roof damage occurred to homes. The tornado then crossed I-90 into the Grand Boulevard and Kenwood neighborhoods, producing more tree damage before moving offshore onto Lake Michigan.						
EF0	Southern Chicago (2nd tornado)	Cook	IL	41.768°N 87.634°W	03:40–03:44	3.6 mi (5.8 km)	200 yd (180 m)
EF0	A weak tornado began near Englewood STEM High School in the neighborhood of Englewood. The tornado moved east, going through Greater Grand Crossing and Woodlawn. Damage around here included a train car being knocked over and some minor roof damage. The tornado entered Jackson Park, damaging trees before moving offshore and becoming a waterspout on Lake Michigan.						
EFU	ENE of Lone Tree Corners to NNE of Henry	Bureau, Putnam	IL	41.19°N 89.47°W	04:33–04:43	10.9 mi (17.5 km)	190 yd (170 m)
EFU	High-resolution satellite imagery showed a well-defined path of downed crops. No other damage occurred.						
EF1	N of Henry	Marshall	IL	41.1254°N 89.3572°W	04:40–04:42	0.45 mi (0.72 km)	50 yd (46 m)
EF1	A mobile home park was struck by a tornado where mainly tree damage was noted. Some trailers were heavily damaged.						
EFU	E of Walnut Grove to S of McNabb	Putnam	IL	41.18°N 89.32°W	04:41–04:48	8.1 mi (13.0 km)	450 yd (410 m)
EFU	A tornado touched down on the eastern bank of the Illinois River, uprooting a few trees. The tornado then moved through farmland, flattening crops and uprooting occasional trees before lifting.						
EFU	NE of Henry to SE of Magnolia	Putnam, Marshall	IL	41.14°N 89.33°W	04:41–04:53	12.8 mi (20.6 km)	620 yd (570 m)
EFU	This tornado initially flattened crops before uprooting dozens of trees in a wooded area. The tornado continued damaging farmland before eventually dissipating.						
EF1	SSE of Henry to N of Varna	Marshall	IL	41.0915°N 89.3481°W	04:42–04:45	6.28 mi (10.11 km)	100 yd (91 m)
EF1	A tornado began just east of the Illinois River and tracked southeast, causing extensive tree damage.						
EFU	ENE of Varna	Marshall	IL	41.05°N 89.19°W	04:48–04:49	0.87 mi (1.40 km)	60 yd (55 m)
EFU	Sentinel satellite imagery showed a tornado tracked across farm fields, only damaging crops.						
EFU	ENE of Varna	Marshall	IL	41.05°N 89.18°W	04:48–04:49	0.87 mi (1.40 km)	60 yd (55 m)
EFU	A second tornado formed that tracked only across farm fields. This tornado paralleled the previous tornado. No damage occurred.						

=== July 15 event ===
List of confirmed tornadoes – Monday, July 15, 2024
EF#	Location	County / Parish	State	Start Coord.	Time (UTC)	Path length	Max width
EFU	ESE of Wenona to N of Long Point	LaSalle, Livingston	IL	41.0292°N 88.9718°W	05:02–05:06	4.2 mi (6.8 km)	150 yd (140 m)
EFU	A tornado was discovered from high-resolution satellite imagery, which showed a swath of damage in crops in farm fields. No other damage occurred.						
EFU	NNW of Dana to S of Long Point	LaSalle, Livingston	IL	40.9943°N 88.9686°W	05:03–05:07	3.9 mi (6.3 km)	100 yd (91 m)
EFU	A tornado was discovered from high-resolution satellite imagery, which showed a swath of damage in crops in farm fields. No other damage occurred.						
EFU	NNE of Long Point	Livingston	IL	41.0307°N 88.8916°W	05:06–05:08	1.9 mi (3.1 km)	225 yd (206 m)
EFU	This brief tornado formed after the 0502 UTC tornado, damaging crops before lifting.						
EF1	ESE of Lacon	Marshall	IL	40.9971°N 89.3629°W	05:10–05:11	0.71 mi (1.14 km)	50 yd (46 m)
EF1	A row of large pine trees was snapped and an outbuilding was damaged.						
EF0	NE of Gluek to W of Raymond	Chippewa	MN	45.0372°N 95.3875°W	12:14–12:17	2.24 mi (3.60 km)	25 yd (23 m)
EF0	About two dozen trees were downed or snapped.						
EF0	Pavilion	Genesee	NY	42.876°N 78.03°W	19:50–19:52	0.75 mi (1.21 km)	75 yd (69 m)
EF0	A narrow path of tree damage occurred.						
EF0	Southeastern Canandaigua	Ontario	NY	42.8781°N 77.2706°W	20:48–20:50	0.75 mi (1.21 km)	75 yd (69 m)
EF0	This EF0 tornado damaged a strip mall, utility poles, and trees on the north shore of Canandaigua Lake.						
EF0	Virgil	Cortland	NY	42.485°N 76.230°W	22:25–22:37	7.5 mi (12.1 km)	175 yd (160 m)
EF0	A few homes sustained minor roof damage and trees were damaged as well.						
EF1	Urbandale to Western Des Moines	Polk	IA	41.6442°N 93.7606°W	22:37–22:47	6.88 mi (11.07 km)	300 yd (270 m)
EF1	This tornado developed near I-35 and moved southeast through or near Urbandale, Windsor Heights, and Des Moines. Extensive tree damage was noted along with damage to homes and power lines.						
EF1	SE of Lincklaen to Otselic	Chenango	NY	42.6549°N 75.8374°W	22:54–23:02	8.69 mi (13.99 km)	250 yd (230 m)
EF1	A high-end EF1 tornado uprooted and snapped hundreds of trees. A barn was partially collapsed, with its roof displaced. Some other structures had minor roofing or window damage. A carport was also lofted.						
EF1	Kieler	Grant	WI	42.5858°N 90.5963°W	23:14–23:15	0.29 mi (0.47 km)	30 yd (27 m)
EF1	This brief tornado damaged the roofs of two structures, an outbuilding, and trees.						
EF0	W of Hale	Jones	IA	42.0237°N 91.0839°W	23:18–23:21	1.51 mi (2.43 km)	50 yd (46 m)
EF0	This high-end EF0 tornado flattened corn in a field before inflicting roof damage to a house at a farmstead. A metal structure was also collapsed onto the house. The tornado continued damaging trees south of the farmstead before lifting just across the Wapsipinicon River.						
EF1	NE of Hanover to Shannon	Jo Daviess, Carroll	IL	42.2932°N 90.262°W	23:40–00:16	29.81 mi (47.97 km)	100 yd (91 m)
EF1	A roof was significantly damaged in Jo Daviess County. The tornado moved through the Lake Carroll area, damaging a garage, gazebo and a boat dock. Numerous trees were also downed in the area. The tornado then tracked through Shannon, downing more trees, before lifting shortly after exiting town.						
EF1	ESE of Woodbine to NW of Willow	Jo Daviess	IL	42.3402°N 90.132°W	23:48–23:58	8.07 mi (12.99 km)	50 yd (46 m)
EF1	This intermittent tornado downed several trees.						
EF2	SW of Millville to ENE of Lena	Jo Daviess, Stephenson	IL	42.4124°N 90.0959°W	23:50–00:09	15.41 mi (24.80 km)	150 yd (140 m)
EF2	An intermittent, low-end EF2 tornado snapped a wooden power pole near its base, snapped trees and impacted a farmstead, damaging an outbuilding and grain elevator.						
EF0	S of Fairport, IA	Muscatine (IA), Rock Island (IL)	IA, IL	41.432°N 90.9313°W	00:02–00:05	3.05 mi (4.91 km)	50 yd (46 m)
EF0	This tornado started on the Mississippi River as a waterspout before landfalling in Illinois where it uprooted trees and snapped large branches.						
EF1	ENE of Edgington to S of Lynn Center	Rock Island, Mercer, Henry	IL	41.3998°N 90.7252°W	00:17–00:45	24.69 mi (39.73 km)	100 yd (91 m)
EF1	Two large grain elevator bins were dented, several outbuildings were damaged, and a few utility poles were snapped. Dozens of trees were downed, snapped, and uprooted.						
EF1	Northern Davenport, IA to Bettendorf, IA to East Moline, IL	Scott (IA), Rock Island (IL)	IA, IL	41.5569°N 90.5776°W	00:19–00:32	7.95 mi (12.79 km)	100 yd (91 m)
EF1	Dozens of large trees were snapped, with some falling on homes and at least one on a car. A large section of an apartment's roof was torn off. The tornado dissipated after crossing the Mississippi River into Illinois.						
EF0	SW of Evansville	Rock	WI	42.753°N 89.345°W	00:26–00:28	1.22 mi (1.96 km)	50 yd (46 m)
EF0	This tornado was recorded by a resident, and two storm chasers documented tree damage.						
EFU	SW of Dakota	Stephenson	IL	42.3682°N 89.5776°W	00:26–00:27	1.01 mi (1.63 km)	10 yd (9.1 m)
EFU	A storm spotter recorded this short-lived tornado that caused no damage.						
EF0	Byron	Ogle	IL	42.1432°N 89.3159°W	00:44–00:51	5.3 mi (8.5 km)	200 yd (180 m)
EF0	This weak tornado moved due east directly through Byron along IL 2/IL 72, damaging trees, crops and blowing the roof off a car wash.						
EF0	Davis Junction	Ogle	IL	42.1032°N 89.1214°W	00:58–01:00	1.7 mi (2.7 km)	200 yd (180 m)
EF0	Tree damage occurred on the north side of Davis Junction north of IL 72.						
EF0	SSE of Winnebago	Winnebago	IL	42.217°N 89.2027°W	00:58–01:00	1.2 mi (1.9 km)	100 yd (91 m)
EF0	Corn crops, trees, and power lines were damaged.						
EF0	WSW of New Milford	Winnebago	IL	42.1687°N 89.092°W	01:01–01:02	0.2 mi (0.32 km)	25 yd (23 m)
EF0	A narrow corridor of weak tree damage occurred.						
EF1	Southern Kewanee	Henry	IL	41.228°N 89.991°W	01:02–01:09	5.24 mi (8.43 km)	200 yd (180 m)
EF1	This deviant tornado in Kewanee downed over one hundred trees in the city, with numerous trees being snapped or uprooted and some falling on homes. Many homesteads had minor roof damage, while a couple had large sections of their roof removed.						
EF0	Monroe Center	Ogle	IL	42.1018°N 89.0234°W	01:05–01:08	2.2 mi (3.5 km)	150 yd (140 m)
EF0	Vehicles were flipped on IL 72. Entering Monroe Center, some trees were uprooted in the town. Exiting town, some crop damage was observed from satellite imagery before the tornado dissipated.						
EF1	Northern Kewanee	Henry	IL	41.2569°N 89.9489°W	01:07–01:10	1.7 mi (2.7 km)	50 yd (46 m)
EF1	A couple of businesses and a storage building had their roofs damaged. Several trees were damaged as well.						
EF1	N of Williamsfield	Knox	IL	40.9578°N 90.0205°W	01:07–01:08	1.25 mi (2.01 km)	150 yd (140 m)
EF1	This brief tornado significantly damaged trees.						
EF0	S of Princeville	Peoria	IL	40.9244°N 89.8936°W	01:15–01:19	4.35 mi (7.00 km)	80 yd (73 m)
EF0	This tornado began in Monica, where a couple of roofs and trees were damaged. The tornado moved southeast toward Princeville, damaging several large trees before dissipating.						
EF1	W of Dunlap	Peoria	IL	40.8595°N 89.7579°W	01:21–01:23	2.4 mi (3.9 km)	150 yd (140 m)
EF1	Many properties were struck and had trees extensively damaged at each one. One property lost forty tees. The tornado also downed a tree onto a powerline.						
EF0	S of Dunlap to Alta	Peoria	IL	40.825°N 89.684°W	01:22–01:25	2.54 mi (4.09 km)	100 yd (91 m)
EF0	Trees and homes were damaged in a few neighborhoods.						
EF1	SW of Germantown Hills	Woodford	IL	40.7597°N 89.4892°W	01:36–01:37	0.38 mi (0.61 km)	100 yd (91 m)
EF1	Several trees were damaged.						
EF0	WSW of Cazenovia	Woodford	IL	40.8433°N 89.3761°W	01:38–01:39	1.37 mi (2.20 km)	80 yd (73 m)
EF0	Three properties had tree damage occur. Corn fields were also damaged.						
EFU	N of Maple Park	DeKalb, Kane	IL	41.9101°N 88.6181°W	01:38–01:41	1.8 mi (2.9 km)	50 yd (46 m)
EFU	A brief tornado debris signature appeared on radar, and crop damage occurred.						
EF1	Morton to NE of Mackinaw	Tazewell	IL	40.6451°N 89.5198°W	01:39–01:54	12.2 mi (19.6 km)	100 yd (91 m)
EF1	This tornado began just outside of East Peoria before quickly moving into northern Morton. The tornado followed I-74 into an industrial complex, causing damage there. The tornado continued moving southeast, uprooting trees around Morton High School. Outside of Morton, more damage was documented at an American Legion building where siding was ripped off. The tornado then lifted shortly after.						
EF1	SE of Germantown Hills	Woodford, Tazewell	IL	40.7531°N 89.4477°W	01:40–01:41	1.23 mi (1.98 km)	100 yd (91 m)
EF1	This tornado began in a wooded subdivision, damaging multiple trees. The tornado then entered a newer subdivision, damaging many more trees. One home had a small part of its roof and siding torn off. A window was also blown out at this home. The tornado then continued southeastward, damaging multiple old trees on a property, including two trees that were uprooted, before lifting.						
EF1	Big Rock to Sugar Grove to Western Aurora	Kane	IL	41.756°N 88.5173°W	01:49–02:00	8.4 mi (13.5 km)	300 yd (270 m)
EF1	A tornado with peak winds of 95 mph touched down near the entrance of Big Rock Campground and tracked east-northeast. In Sugar Grove, just south of US 30, it caused minor roof damage to several homes and snapped or uprooted numerous healthy trees. The Sugar Grove Fire Department sustained minor structural damage, likely from airborne debris, and a 200 lb (91 kg) training roof section was shifted. The tornado crossed IL 56 twice, producing additional minor structural and tree damage as it moved into the west side of Aurora. It continued northeast where it caused more tree damage, downed fences, and sporadic damage to shingles and fascia before dissipating within the city.						
EFU	SSW of Deer Creek	Tazewell	IL	40.6004°N 89.3452°W	01:51–01:52	0.87 mi (1.40 km)	80 yd (73 m)
EFU	Sentinel satellite imagery revealed a tornado that tracked southeastward through a cornfield. No damage occurred except for corn crops.						
EF0	Northern Sugar Grove to North Aurora	Kane	IL	41.7895°N 88.4774°W	01:52–02:05	10.1 mi (16.3 km)	250 yd (230 m)
EF0	This high-end EF0 tornado began just north of the Aurora Municipal Airport and moved northeast, crossing IL 47 and passing through the Waubonsee Community College campus, where it snapped and downed numerous trees and limbs. It continued into a subdivision south of I-88, causing minor roof damage to homes, uprooting and snapping trees, and damaging utility poles. The tornado crossed I-88, producing additional tree damage and minor fascia damage to nearby homes. Fallen limbs also caused damage to houses and vehicles, and power lines were downed. The tornado crossed the Fox River and produced more sporadic tree damage before dissipating just north of I-88.						
EF0	ESE of Minonk to WNW of Flanagan	Woodford, Livingston	IL	40.8834°N 88.996°W	01:55–02:00	3.78 mi (6.08 km)	30 yd (27 m)
EF0	A high-end EF0 mainly damaged trees and crops during its life, but a single power pole was also damaged.						
EF1	Northern Yorkville to Oswego to Southern Naperville	Kendall, Will	IL	41.6848°N 88.4695°W	01:55–02:18	19.2 mi (30.9 km)	200 yd (180 m)
EF1	This tornado touched down on the north side of Yorkville and moved east through Bristol, producing tree damage. It then moved into Oswego, where widespread tree damage occurred near IL 71. Numerous large trees were uprooted or snapped, with some falling onto houses and others taking down utility poles and power lines. Roof damage to several homes was noted just east of the Fox River, likely where the tornado reached its peak intensity. The tornado continued east-northeast, crossing into Will County just west of US 30. It proceeded to cause more tree damage along its path and crossed IL 59, where additional limbs were blown down. The tornado eventually dissipated after continuing eastward through residential areas.						
EF1	E of Lisbon to Southern Shorewood to Joliet	Kendall, Will	IL	41.465°N 88.4033°W	02:05–02:26	19.5 mi (31.4 km)	250 yd (230 m)
EF1	This high-end EF1 tornado produced sporadic tree damage in Kendall County. Upon entering Will County, it caused damage to numerous trees and outbuildings. In Shorewood, it snapped trees and crossed the Fox River, where it caused a partial roof collapse to a home, injuring two people inside. The tornado crossed I-55 and snapped trees in a forest preserve south of the Joliet Regional Airport, with additional damage to trees and corn crops in a nearby subdivision. The tornado continued across the Inwood Golf Course, where over one hundred trees were damaged, some as old as seventy years. It then crossed US 52, causing significant damage to trees, power lines, utility poles, and roofs—including a church just north of the route. This area likely experienced the tornado at peak strength. The tornado continued northeast, crossed the Des Plaines River, and then weakened, producing only sporadic tree damage before dissipating near US 6.						
EF2	Southern Channahon to Southern Frankfort to Matteson	Grundy, Will, Cook	IL	41.3876°N 88.3755°W	02:09–02:41	34.6 mi (55.7 km)	325 yd (297 m)
EF2	This strong, long-track tornado touched down in Grundy County initially producing sporadic tree and utility pole damage. As it neared the Illinois River and crossed into Will County, causing minor roof damage to homes. The tornado intensified and reached peak strength as it crossed I-55, where two metal trusses collapsed, bringing down high tension power lines onto the interstate. Two semi trucks crashed into the fallen lines, and five other vehicles were trapped. Two people were injured, and one person remained stuck in their vehicle for hours. Just west of the interstate, parked semi trucks were overturned, a pickup and van were flipped, and an office building sustained major roof damage. Farther northeast, significant tree and utility pole damage continued, along with roof damage to several homes and farm storage buildings. The tornado crossed IL 53, causing widespread tree damage, including trees falling onto homes and vehicles. It continued east, producing further roof damage as it crossed US 52 and later US 45. More tree damage was observed near a golf course. The tornado then entered Cook County and weakened slightly, though it still caused tree damage as it crossed US 30 and finally Interstate 57 in Illinois before dissipating.						
EF0	Northwestern Joliet to Northern Crest Hill to Lockport	Kendall, Will	IL	41.5586°N 88.3015°W	02:10–02:30	17 mi (27 km)	300 yd (270 m)
EF0	A tornado initially caused damage to trees, fences, and roofs in a residential area. It snapped a tall tree and damaged the roof of Plainfield South High School before crossing into Will County. The tornado produced sporadic tree damage and then crossed IL 59 and caused significant tree damage in a neighborhood. As it continued east, crossed I-55, and moved over the Louis Joliet Mall area, causing roof and fascia damage to a nearby church near US 30. The tornado jogged northeast and passed through another residential area, causing minor roof and tree damage before crossing IL 53 and the Des Plaines River. As it moved across Lockport, tree limbs and fences were downed. The tornado continued east, snapping trees and blowing down fences before crossing I-355 and ending shortly after.						
EF0	Eastern Glen Ellyn to Lombard	DuPage	IL	41.8675°N 88.0533°W	02:23–02:27	3.1 mi (5.0 km)	150 yd (140 m)
EF0	This high-end EF0 tornado touched down and moved northeast, producing a corridor of concentrated tree damage. Several large, healthy trees were snapped or had limbs removed. One house sustained minor stucco damage, and additional minor roof and fascia damage occurred to several homes. A house also lost part of its roof. After crossing I-355, the tornado caused more significant tree damage near residential areas and an elementary school. Damage became more sparse as the tornado weakened and eventually dissipated.						
EF0	Villa Park	DuPage	IL	41.8867°N 87.9777°W	02:29–02:30	0.8 mi (1.3 km)	50 yd (46 m)
EF0	This brief tornado produced a local corridor of tree damage, mainly in the form of downed branches. Power line damage also occurred.						
EF0	Mokena	Will	IL	41.5278°N 87.8985°W	02:33–02:36	2.9 mi (4.7 km)	300 yd (270 m)
EF0	A high-end EF0 tornado touched down near the west side of Mokena and tracked northeast through the downtown area, roughly following the railroad tracks. Along its path, numerous trees and limbs were downed, fences were blown over, and several buildings sustained minor roof damage. Utility poles and power lines were also damaged. The tornado crossed US 45 before dissipating.						
EF0	Eastern Bensenville to Western Rosemont	DuPage, Cook	IL	41.9546°N 87.938°W	02:34–02:42	4.1 mi (6.6 km)	250 yd (230 m)
EF0	This tornado touched down just southwest of O’Hare International Airport, damaging trees before moving east-northeast across the airport. On the airport's property, it caused damage to windows, doors, exterior paneling, and roofing on multiple terminals and gates. Carts and other loose objects were displaced or thrown. The tornado continued east near I-190, where additional tree damage occurred, and it dissipated just west of I-294.						
EF0	NW of Bourbonnais to Southern Manteno to Whitaker	Kankakee	IL	41.2252°N 87.9257°W	02:35–02:45	12.3 mi (19.8 km)	275 yd (251 m)
EF0	This tornado began in a field and caused tree damage shortly after forming. It moved east, crossing US 45 where it blew down a utility pole, then crossed I-57 and caused extensive tree damage in southern Manteno. Several homes in the area sustained minor roof and fascia damage, and multiple fences were damaged. As the tornado continued east, it damaged the siding and skirting of several modular homes and tore roofing material from two distribution warehouse buildings. It went on to damage trees, power lines, and farm outbuildings before dissipating in a field just west of Tower Creek.						
EF0	Broadview	Cook	IL	41.8641°N 87.8692°W	02:36–02:38	1.2 mi (1.9 km)	175 yd (160 m)
EF0	A high-end EF0 tornado touched down and moved east-northeast, initially damaging a warehouse where roof, siding, and windows were impacted. It continued on to peel portions of the roofs from three apartment buildings, depositing debris nearby. A garage also partially collapsed. Afterward, the tornado caused only tree damage before dissipating.						
EF1	Justice to Bridgeview	Cook	IL	41.7513°N 87.8573°W	02:37–02:40	2.1 mi (3.4 km)	75 yd (69 m)
EF1	A low-end EF1 tornado touched down near the Chicago Sanitary and Ship Canal, just north of I-294. It moved through a mobile home park, damaging trees and homes. Several large, healthy trees were uprooted or snapped, and minor shingle, siding, and fascia damage was observed. A greenhouse was blown roughly 75 feet (23 m). It continued through a cemetery, broadened in width, and then dissipated east of IL 43.						
EF0	S of Peotone to WSW of Beecher	Will	IL	41.3082°N 87.7869°W	02:41–02:46	6.4 mi (10.3 km)	100 yd (91 m)
EF0	This tornado initially caused large tree limbs to fall and snapped the tops of about twenty trees. As it moved east, it produced widespread tree damage and caused a collapsed outbuilding and broken windows to two homes. The tornado then shifted northeast, causing significant roof damage to a house and continuing to down trees. Near the end of its path, shingles were torn from a roof and a chicken coop was destroyed before it dissipated.						
EF0	S of Palos Heights to Southern Blue Island	Cook	IL	41.6438°N 87.8004°W	02:41–02:48	5.7 mi (9.2 km)	300 yd (270 m)
EF0	This tornado touched down west of IL 43 and tracked eastward, roughly paralleling a local street. It caused numerous tree limbs to fall along trails in a forest preserve and produced significant tree damage. Minor roof damage and a large uprooted tree were reported near the midpoint of the path. The tornado continued to produce tree damage as it crossed I-294 and eventually dissipated east of the interstate.						
EF0	Oak Forest	Cook	IL	41.6039°N 87.7714°W	02:43–02:44	0.4 mi (0.64 km)	85 yd (78 m)
EF0	A brief caused tree damage and minor roof and fascia damage to several homes. One home also sustained damage to siding, gutters, a vinyl fence, and a broken window. The tornado quickly dissipated after affecting a small residential area.						
EF1	Flossmoor to Homewood to Thornton	Cook	IL	41.5379°N 87.6939°W	02:43–02:49	5.5 mi (8.9 km)	250 yd (230 m)
EF1	This tornado caused extensive tree damage, including large trees snapped and uprooted, as it tracked northeast through residential areas. Several homes sustained minor roof damage and had windows blown out. The Thornton Recreation Center suffered partial roof loss, and power poles were knocked down nearby. A large tree limb also fell onto a house. The tornado ended just south of I-294.						
EF0	Northern Country Club Hills	Cook	IL	41.5825°N 87.7151°W	02:45–02:46	0.4 mi (0.64 km)	125 yd (114 m)
EF0	A brief tornado caused tree damage that brought down power lines and downed a pine tree onto a house.						
EF1	Southern Chicago (1st tornado)	Cook	IL	41.7645°N 87.7104°W	02:47–02:51	3.2 mi (5.1 km)	150 yd (140 m)
EF1	This low-end EF1 tornado touched down on the southwest side of Marquette Park in the Chicago Lawn neighborhood, snapping several willow trees near their bases. It moved northeast through the park and adjacent golf course, producing a concentrated corridor of significant tree damage. As it continued, numerous trees and limbs were downed in residential areas, blocking streets and breaking at least one light pole. The tornado then turned east and entered the West Englewood neighborhood, causing additional tree damage as it crossed William Ogden Park before dissipating just northeast of the area.						
EF1	Chicago (2nd tornado)	Cook	IL	41.8744°N 87.6998°W	02:47–02:53	3.1 mi (5.0 km)	400 yd (370 m)
EF1	A tornado touched down along I-290 in the East Garfield Park neighborhood, damaging trees. The tornado then moved into the Near West Side area and uprooted many trees by Rush Hospital. The most significant damage occurred near the Chicago Police Academy, where several trees were uprooted nearby and minor fascia occurred to the building. Roof damage was also noted on a nearby building. The tornado weakened and dissipated right next to the Presidential Towers, just before crossing the Chicago River into downtown Chicago.						
EF0	Chicago (3rd tornado)	Cook	IL	41.8974°N 87.7035°W	02:50–02:52	1.4 mi (2.3 km)	150 yd (140 m)
EF0	A high-end EF0 tornado tracked through the West Town neighborhood. Along its path, it uprooted and snapped trees, downed limbs, damaged utility poles, and blew out a few windows of homes. Minor roof and siding damage also occurred. A large tree was uprooted and fell onto a car. The tornado ended after causing additional scattered tree and structural damage.						
EF1	ENE of Grant Park	Kankakee	IL	41.2636°N 87.5866°W	02:51–02:53	2.6 mi (4.2 km)	100 yd (91 m)
EF1	This low-end EF1 tornado touched down in a rural field and quickly intensified, peeling a significant portion of roofing material from a food facility building and overturning a semi trailer in a nearby parking lot. It then moved northeast across open fields with minimal impact until reaching a more developed area where numerous trees were damaged and a few homes sustained minor roof and fascia damage. The tornado ended in a field shortly afterward.						
EF1	S of Eagle Lake, IL to Crown Point, IN to Valparaiso, IN	Will (IL), Lake (IN), Porter (IN)	IL, IN	41.3608°N 87.5595°W	02:52–03:20	29.1 mi (46.8 km)	300 yd (270 m)
EF1	This long-track touched down near Eagle Lake. In its early stages, it damaged trees and an outbuilding before crossing into Indiana. After crossing US 41, it produced extensive tree damage, snapped some trees, and caused minor roof and fascia damage to several homes. A metal building lost most of its roof, a chimney was blown off, and a garage partially collapsed. The tornado continued causing tree and power line damage as it moved through Crown Point, south of US 231, and later crossed US 231 again, damaging an industrial building near SR 53. It peeled metal roof panels, blew out garage doors, collapsed a small wall section, and lofted insulation into power lines. After crossing I-65, it produced additional tree damage and entered Porter County, where sporadic tree damage continued until it crossed Route 30. North of US 30 in Valparaiso, the tornado uprooted and snapped many trees, causing significant damage to homes and vehicles. Structural damage occurred when large trees fell on houses. The tornado weakened and ended just west of SR 49.						
EF0	Lowell	Lake	IN	41.2838°N 87.4526°W	02:58–03:00	2.4 mi (3.9 km)	100 yd (91 m)
EF0	A weak tornado caused minor roof and fascia damage to several homes and produced tree damage along its eastward path. The tornado ended just before crossing SR 2 after continuing to down trees in the area.						
EF0	N of Shelby to SSW of Kouts	Lake, Jasper, Porter	IN	41.2153°N 87.348°W	03:02–03:16	16.4 mi (26.4 km)	100 yd (91 m)
EF0	This tornadotouched down in Lake County just southwest of SR 55 and produced tree damage, including a fallen limb that damaged a car. It crossed I-65 and continued northeast, producing sporadic tree damage before crossing the Kankakee River into Jasper County near US 231. The tornado caused tree and crop damage across northern Jasper County, with satellite imagery showing concentrated crop damage before it crossed the Kankakee River again into Porter County. Additional tree damage occurred in Porter County before the tornado ended south of Crooked Creek.						
EF1	S of Waterford	LaPorte	IN	41.6426°N 86.8714°W	03:32–03:38	3.21 mi (5.17 km)	75 yd (69 m)
EF1	A tornado developed and caused widespread tree damage on a private property, where several hundred hardwood and softwood trees were uprooted or snapped. Additional concentrated tree damage occurred farther east, and many homes and outbuildings sustained minor to moderate damage from falling trees. The tornado weakened and ended as it was overtaken by a broader microburst.						

=== July 16 event ===
List of confirmed tornadoes – Tuesday, July 16, 2024
EF#	Location	County / Parish	State	Start Coord.	Time (UTC)	Path length	Max width
EF0	E of Tippecanoe	Marshall	IN	41.1976°N 86.0867°W	04:09–04:11	0.71 mi (1.14 km)	75 yd (69 m)
EF0	This brief tornado snapped and uprooted several trees.						
EF1	Southern Elkhart	Elkhart	IN	41.6651°N 85.9719°W	04:21–04:23	1.19 mi (1.92 km)	250 yd (230 m)
EF1	This tornado snapped numerous trees and tree limbs.						
EF0	W of Holstein	Warren	MO	38.6468°N 91.1996°W	16:34–16:35	0.25 mi (0.40 km)	25 yd (23 m)
EF0	An emergency manager reported damage to vegetation in the area.						
EF0	WSW of House Springs	Jefferson	MO	38.39°N 90.65°W	17:01–17:04	1.96 mi (3.15 km)	25 yd (23 m)
EF0	Concentrated areas of tree damage occurred.						
EF1	Canastota	Madison	NY	43.0771°N 75.7618°W	19:00–19:07	1.42 mi (2.29 km)	100 yd (91 m)
EF1	1 death – This tornado passed through Canastota, partially or completely unroofing homes, damaging or destroying outbuildings, damaging warehouses and other buildings, snapping power poles, and snapping or uprooting trees. An elderly man who was outside his home near the center of town was injured when the tornado lofted him into the soffit of a masonry building next door; he would later die from his injuries. A second person nearby was also lifted into the building but was uninjured.						
EF1	NE of Taberg to SSW of Beartown	Oneida	NY	43.3123°N 75.5808°W	19:19–19:30	6.5 mi (10.5 km)	200 yd (180 m)
EF1	A tornado initially damaged trees before impacting some structures. A mobile home was shifted off its blocks and had much of its roof covering ripped off. Additional roof and garage damage occurred in the area. Two trees fell on a residence and an outbuilding, significantly damaging the roofs of both. The tornado impaled small to medium tree limbs into the ground in a backyard before lifting.						
EF2	Rome	Oneida	NY	43.21°N 75.49°W	18:25–18:35	5.25 mi (8.45 km)	300 yd (270 m)
EF2	This significant, high-end EF2 tornado began near the Erie Canal and tracked northeast through Rome. In Rome, two churches sustained significant damage to their steeples and roofs, with complete collapses of some walls. Bricks falling from the churches and other buildings crushed multiple vehicles. A vehicle was flipped in a parking lot and an RV was pushed over. Hundreds of large trees were snapped or uprooted, some damaging homes. There was also significant roof loss on multiple residences, along with blown out garage doors and windows. A few properties had debris impaled into their lawns or homes. The tornado shifted a decommissioned B-52 bomber at Griffiss International Airport before lifting nearby.						
EF1	Ohio	Herkimer	NY	43.3162°N 74.9864°W	19:57–19:59	0.7 mi (1.1 km)	180 yd (160 m)
EF1	Trees were snapped or uprooted throughout the town.						
EF1	ESE of Old Forge to SSW of Inlet	Herkimer	NY	43.6761°N 74.877°W	20:10–20:16	4.1 mi (6.6 km)	150 yd (140 m)
EF1	Satellite imagery showed widespread tree damage which correlated with a TDS on radar.						
EF1	WSW of Wells	Hamilton	NY	43.3603°N 74.4044°W	20:30–20:33	1.53 mi (2.46 km)	300 yd (270 m)
EF1	This tornado touched down along the West Branch of the Sacandaga River, downing and snapping trees.						
EF1	ENE of Piseco	Hamilton	NY	43.4394°N 74.4802°W	20:37–20:39	0.51 mi (0.82 km)	200 yd (180 m)
EF1	This tornado snapped and uprooted numerous trees and utility poles. Minor structural damage to homes and utility buildings occurred as well.						
EF1	NE of Wells	Hamilton, Warren	NY	43.424°N 74.2011°W	20:44–20:52	4.56 mi (7.34 km)	200 yd (180 m)
EF1	Satellite imagery showed widespread tree damage which correlated with a TDS on radar.						
EF1	NNE of Edinburg to W of Corinth	Saratoga	NY	43.2539°N 74.0641°W	20:48–21:00	8.36 mi (13.45 km)	50 yd (46 m)
EF1	This high-end EF1 tornado occurred within a large area of wind damage, with some trees downed in a convergent pattern. During clean up efforts, a woman was seriously injured after being struck by a tree.						
EF0	NW of Warrensburg to NNW of Bolton Landing	Warren	NY	43.5655°N 73.8502°W	21:22–21:29	9.64 mi (15.51 km)	150 yd (140 m)
EF0	This high-end EF0 tornado snapped and uprooted numerous trees. Several utility poles were also snapped or downed.						
EF1	NNE of Lyme	Grafton	NH	43.82°N 72.15°W	23:29–23:36	1.8 mi (2.9 km)	250 yd (230 m)
EF1	A high-end EF1 tornado first touched down near a pond, downing numerous trees on the pond's western shoreline. The tornado then tracked due north, causing sporadic tree damage. The tornado then grew wider and snapped and uprooted hundreds of trees. A garage was also shifted 15 ft (4.6 m), and a tree fell onto the roof of a home. The tornado then climbed a hill, continuing to increase in severity as trees and branches fell on homes, lifting shortly thereafter.						
EF1	W of Broken Bow	Custer	NE	41.403°N 99.675°W	23:54	0.01 mi (0.016 km)	1 yd (0.91 m)
EF1	This extremely brief tornado which was observed by a storm spotter and captured on a surveillance camera was embedded within a much larger area of both damaging straight-line winds and large hail. It tossed an 800 lb (360 kg) trailer onto the far front corner panel of a car and moved a Suburban 3 in (76 mm) during the two seconds it was in contact with the ground.						

=== July 20 event ===
List of confirmed tornadoes – Saturday, July 20, 2024
EF#	Location	County / Parish	State	Start Coord.	Time (UTC)	Path length	Max width
EFU	S of Monticello	San Juan	UT	37.78°N 109.35°W	20:00–21:00	0.1 mi (0.16 km)	10 yd (9.1 m)
EFU	A trained spotter observed a landspout.						
EF0	S of Spring Hill	Pasco	FL	28.43°N 82.6°W	20:15–20:16	0.01 mi (0.016 km)	15 yd (14 m)
EF0	This weak tornado snapped a few tree limbs.						
EFU	NW of Primghar	O'Brien	IA	43.1042°N 95.6847°W	22:10–22:13	0.62 mi (1.00 km)	25 yd (23 m)
EFU	A brief landspout occurred. No damage was visible from drone or satellite imagery.						
EF0	SE of Georgetown	Putnam	FL	29.3557°N 82.6157°W	23:00–23:05	1.49 mi (2.40 km)	5 yd (4.6 m)
EF0	This waterspout on Lake George made landfall on an island but caused no damage.						
EF0	W of Hastings	Putnam	FL	29.7156°N 81.566°W	01:33–01:35	0.42 mi (0.68 km)	5 yd (4.6 m)
EF0	A waterspout on the St. Johns River was observed by a county deputy.						

=== July 21 event ===
List of confirmed tornadoes – Sunday, July 21, 2024
EF#	Location	County / Parish	State	Start Coord.	Time (UTC)	Path length	Max width
EFU	WSW of Jay	Delaware	OK	36.4034°N 94.8499°W	21:50–21:51	0.1 mi (0.16 km)	75 yd (69 m)
EFU	This brief tornado occurred over open country.						

=== July 23 event ===
List of confirmed tornadoes – Tuesday, July 23, 2024
EF#	Location	County / Parish	State	Start Coord.	Time (UTC)	Path length	Max width
EF0	WSW of Lake Wales	Polk	FL	27.87°N 81.67°W	21:30–21:32	0.06 mi (0.097 km)	25 yd (23 m)
EF0	A brief landspout minorly damaged a trailer and carport-like structure.						

=== July 24 event ===
List of confirmed tornadoes – Wednesday, July 24, 2024
EF#	Location	County / Parish	State	Start Coord.	Time (UTC)	Path length	Max width
EF0	Eastern Orwell	Oswego	NY	43.5768°N 75.8982°W	19:25–19:28	0.2 mi (0.32 km)	75 yd (69 m)
EF0	This high-end EF0 tornado uprooted a few trees and damaged multiple large tree limbs.						
EF0	ENE of Broadalbin	Fulton	NY	43.0593°N 74.1646°W	20:41–20:42	0.16 mi (0.26 km)	30 yd (27 m)
EF0	A few tree limbs were downed and two trees were uprooted.						
EF1	NE of Ridgeway to N of Halifax	Halifax	VA	36.8261°N 79.1162°W	22:06–22:24	9.3 mi (15.0 km)	75 yd (69 m)
EF1	Numerous trees were snapped or downed.						

=== July 25 event ===
List of confirmed tornadoes – Thursday, July 25, 2024
EF#	Location	County / Parish	State	Start Coord.	Time (UTC)	Path length	Max width
EF0	Glenns Ferry	Elmore	ID	42.9515°N 115.3005°W	23:00–23:03	0.55 mi (0.89 km)	30 yd (27 m)
EF0	This landspout downed several trees and branches, damaged power lines, and caused some roof damage within the town.						

=== July 26 event ===
List of confirmed tornadoes – Friday, July 26, 2024
EF#	Location	County / Parish	State	Start Coord.	Time (UTC)	Path length	Max width
EFU	ESE of Alfalfa Center	Mississippi	MO	36.96°N 89.18°W	18:27–18:28	0.38 mi (0.61 km)	25 yd (23 m)
EFU	A landspout was photographed on the shores of the Mississippi River. No damage was reported.						
EF0	SW of Taylor	Navajo	AZ	34.42°N 110.21°W	22:32	1 mi (1.6 km)	10 yd (9.1 m)
EF0	A picture was taken of a landspout in the Sitgreaves National Forest.						

=== July 29 event ===
List of confirmed tornadoes – Monday, July 29, 2024
EF#	Location	County / Parish	State	Start Coord.	Time (UTC)	Path length	Max width
EF0	Murfreesboro	Rutherford	TN	35.855°N 86.3899°W	19:24–19:29	3.34 mi (5.38 km)	100 yd (91 m)
EF0	A weak tornado impacted the Middle Tennessee State University campus where large tree branches were downed and some trees were uprooted. Minor structural damage was inflicted to the stadium, including some siding material off a nearby building, some fencing damage, and a trailer was moved 30 yd (27 m) and rotated 270°.						
EFU	W of Alhambra	Madison	IL	38.8896°N 89.7899°W	01:45–01:46	0.05 mi (0.080 km)	10 yd (9.1 m)
EFU	Storm chasers reported a rope tornado in a field. No damage was reported.						
EF2	S of Perkinsville	Hamilton, Madison	IN	40.138°N 85.8719°W	01:41–01:50	3.04 mi (4.89 km)	50 yd (46 m)
EF2	This tornado began by damaging the roof of a metal barn and uprooting trees in Hamilton County. Sporadic tree damage continued into Madison County before crossing the White River, where several trees were snapped and uprooted. The tornado then struck a town administration building, significantly damaging the brick wall and roof which was thrown over 150 yd (140 m). One bus also had a long metal support beam driven through its frame. The tornado then dissipated over a nearby cornfield.						
EF0	WSW of Whitcomb	Franklin	IN	39.4363°N 84.9607°W	01:44–01:46	0.7 mi (1.1 km)	80 yd (73 m)
EF0	A tornado minorly damaged an outbuilding's roof and a home. A few trees were also damaged, which included broken branches. Convergent swirls were also noted in farm fields.						

=== July 30 event ===
List of confirmed tornadoes – Tuesday, July 30, 2024
EF#	Location	County / Parish	State	Start Coord.	Time (UTC)	Path length	Max width
EF1	W of Hicks to ENE of Blanchester	Warren, Clinton	OH	39.3588°N 84.0864°W	04:40–04:50	8 mi (13 km)	200 yd (180 m)
EF1	This tornado initially damaged trees before ripping shingles and gutters off a home. More trees continued to be snapped and uprooted as the tornado tracked southeast where the roof of an outbuilding was damaged. The tornado kept damaging trees and crossing county lines before dissipating shortly after.						
EF1	N of Melody Hill to NE of Newburgh	Vanderburgh, Warrick	IN	38.0497°N 87.5087°W	23:30–23:42	10.99 mi (17.69 km)	300 yd (270 m)
EF1	This high-end EF1 tornado began just to the east of Evansville Regional Airport where damage to trees occurred. The tornado moved just outside the city limits of Melody Hill where a few homes had minor roof and gutter damage. The tornado continued inflicting strong damage to trees for the remainder of its path before lifting.						
EFU	SE of Johnstown	Brown	NE	42.55°N 100.01°W	01:57	0.1 mi (0.16 km)	50 yd (46 m)
EFU	Local law enforcement reported a tornado.						

=== July 31 event ===
List of confirmed tornadoes – Wednesday, July 31, 2024
EF#	Location	County / Parish	State	Start Coord.	Time (UTC)	Path length	Max width
EFU	E of Tripp	Hutchinson	SD	43.22°N 97.89°W	00:07–00:08	0.01 mi (0.016 km)	10 yd (9.1 m)
EFU	A brief landspout touched down in an open field and was spotted by a local fire department. No known damage occurred.						

== See also ==
- Tornadoes of 2024
- List of United States tornadoes in May 2024
- List of United States tornadoes from August to October 2024
