= Alfalfa (disambiguation) =

Alfalfa (Medicago sativa) is a perennial flowering plant and flower cultivated as a forage crop (alfalfa hay), foodstuff (alfalfa sprouts), and field nitrogen fixer in crop rotation.

Alfalfa may also refer to:

== Places ==
- Alfalfa, Alabama, U.S.; an unincorporated community in Marengo County
- Alfalfa, Louisiana, U.S.; an unincorporated community in Rapides Parish
- Alfalfa Center, Missouri, U.S.; an unincorporated community in Mississippi County
- Alfalfa, Oklahoma, U.S.; an unincorporated community in Caddo County
- Alfalfa, Oregon, U.S.; an unincorporated community in Central Oregon
- Alfalfa County, Oklahoma, U.S.
- Alfalfa, Washington State, U.S.
- Alfalfa, Seville, Andalusia, Spain; a neighbourhood

== People and fictional characters ==
- Farmer Alfalfa, an animated cartoon character
- Carl "Alfalfa" Switzer, an American actor (1927–1959)
  - Alfalfa, a character in the Our Gang series played by Carl Switzer and the source of the actor's nickname

== Other uses ==
- ALFALFA, a radio astronomy survey carried out by the Arecibo dish
- Alfalfa House, Enmore, Sydney, Australia; a food co-op
- Alfalfa Club, a social club
- "Alfalfa" (song), a 2009 song by 'Masters of Reality' off the album Pine Cross Dover

== See also ==
- Alfafar, municipality in Spain
- William H. "Alfalfa Bill" Murray (1869–1956) U.S. politician
