= Stumptown, Virginia =

Stumptown may refer to several unincorporated communities in the U.S. state of Virginia:

- Stumptown, Loudoun County, Virginia
- Stumptown, Northampton County, Virginia
