= Winner, Minnesota =

Former community in Minnesota, United States

Winner
- Former community
- Location within Minnesota Location within the United States
- Coordinates: 48°35′52″N 95°26′24″W
- Country: United States
- State: Minnesota
- County: Roseau
- Elevation: 1,237 ft (377 m)
- Time zone: UTC-6 (Central (CST))
  - Summer (DST): UTC-5 (CDT)
- Area code: 218
- GNIS feature ID: 655017

Winner is an abandoned townsite in the former Elkwood Township in southeastern Roseau County, Minnesota, United States.

== History ==
The community of Winner had a post office from 1913 until 1937. All that remains of the town today is a singular silo.
