= Alfalfa, Louisiana =

- Unincorporated community
- Location within Louisiana Location within the United States
- Coordinates: 31°22′11″N 92°37′07″W
- Country: United States
- State: Louisiana
- Parish: Rapides
- Elevation: 85 ft (26 m)
- Time zone: UTC-6 (Central (CST))
  - Summer (DST): UTC-5 (CDT)
- ZIP code: 71409
- GNIS feature ID: 546960

Alfalfa is an unincorporated community in Rapides Parish, Louisiana, United States.
