= Ridgeway, Pittsylvania County, Virginia =

Unincorporated community in Virginia, US

Coordinates: 36°59′22″N 79°28′57″W

Ridgeway, Pittsylvania County is an unincorporated community in Pittsylvania County, Virginia, United States.
