= Elkwood Township, Roseau County, Minnesota =

Former township of Roseau County, Minnesota, United States

Elkwood Township
- Former township
- Interactive map of Elkwood Township
- Coordinates: 48.577°N 95.405°W
- Country: United States
- State: Minnesota
- County: Roseau

Elkwood Township was formerly a township in Roseau County, Minnesota.

== History ==
The township was dissolved in 1937 and is now part of the large unorganized territory of Roseau County. Elkwood Township once had elk roaming in its prairies, but is mostly forested.
