= Larslan, Montana =

- Unincorporated community
- Location within Montana Location within the United States
- Coordinates: 48°34′42″N 106°11′38″W
- Country: United States
- State: Montana
- County: Valley
- Elevation: 2,910 ft (890 m)
- Time zone: UTC-7 (Mountain (MST))
  - Summer (DST): UTC-6 (MDT)
- ZIP code: 59244
- Area code: 406
- GNIS feature ID: 767926

Larslan is an unincorporated community in Valley County, Montana, United States. Larslan is 20 miles (32 km) northeast of St. Marie. The community had a former post office which closed on July 30, 2010, though Larslan retains the ZIP code 59244. Next to the post office there is an old one-room school house, play structure and basketball court.

The Larslan post office opened in 1918. Beginning in the late 1920s, the town had a sizeable Mennonite population; the Mennonite Brethren Church held services from 1928 to 1990.
