= Hale, Iowa =

- Unincorporated community
- Location within Iowa Location within the United States
- Coordinates: 42°00′45″N 91°03′34″W
- Country: United States
- State: Iowa
- County: Jones
- Elevation: 797 ft (243 m)
- Time zone: UTC-6 (Central (CST))
  - Summer (DST): UTC-5 (CDT)
- Area code: 319
- GNIS feature ID: 457200

Hale (also known as Hale Village) is an unincorporated community in Jones County, Iowa, United States. Hale is north of the Wapsipinicon River, east of Olin, and west of Oxford Junction.

== History ==
Hale was platted in 1876 by J. C. Austin. Hale's population was 76 in 1902. The population was 77 in 1940.
