= Ballard, Illinois =

Former village in Illinois

Coordinates: 40°41′27″N 88°45′15″W

Ballard was a small village located between Chenoa and Lexington, Illinois, on the Union Pacific railroad.

== History ==
At one point in time, Ballard had a decent population with a few businesses and homes. The last remaining marker of the settlement was the Graham and Bennion Elevator, better known to locals simply as "the Ballard elevator". The roughly 80-foot structure was demolished in 2006.
