= Stumptown, Loudoun County, Virginia =

Unincorporated community in Virginia, United States

Stumptown, Virginia
- Unincorporated community
- Location within Northern Virginia Location within Virginia Location within the United States
- Coordinates: 39°12′30″N 77°33′5″W
- Country: United States
- State: Virginia
- County: Loudoun
- Time zone: UTC−5 (Eastern (EST))
  - Summer (DST): UTC−4 (EDT)

Stumptown is an unincorporated community on the eastern flanks of Catoctin Mountain in Loudoun County, Virginia, United States.
