= Alfalfa Center, Missouri =

Unincorporated community in Missouri, United States

Coordinates: 36°57′47″N 89°12′26″W

Alfalfa Center is an unincorporated community in Mississippi County, in the U.S. state of Missouri.

Alfalfa Center was laid out in 1935, and named for a local alfalfa processing factory.
