= Hurricane Beryl tornado outbreak =

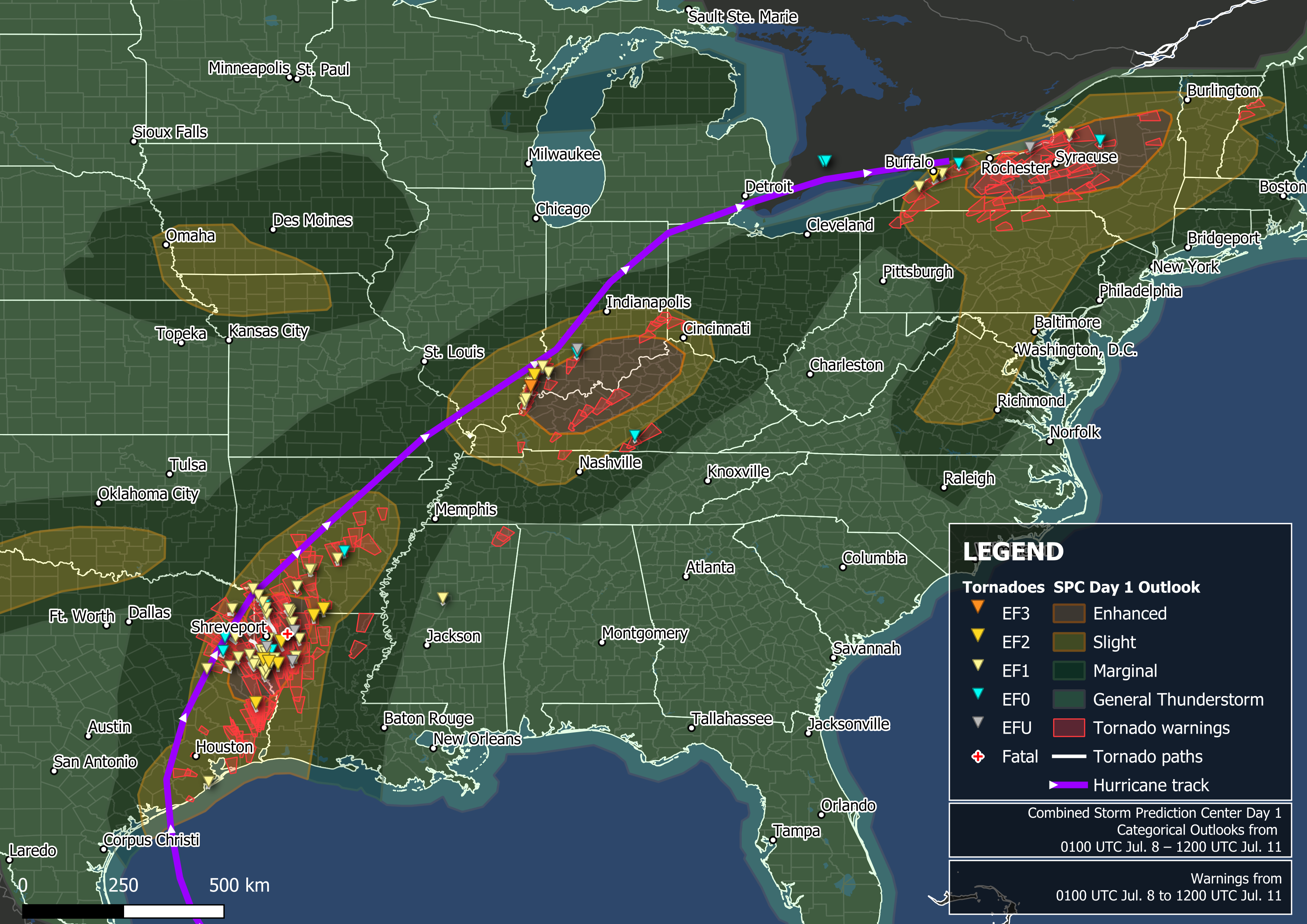
- Map of tornadoes and tornado warnings associated with Beryl across the Central United States.

Tornado outbreak
- Tornadoes: 71
- Max. rating: EF3 tornado
- Duration: July 8–10, 2024
- Highest winds: 140 mph (230 km/h); EF3 tornado in Mount Vernon, Indiana.

Overall effects
- Fatalities: 2
- Injuries: 5
- Damage: >$6.74 million (2024 USD)
- Areas affected: South Central United States, Mississippi Valley, Ohio Valley, Northeastern United States, Ontario
- Part of the tornado outbreaks of 2024 and Hurricane Beryl
- Effects: Texas; Tornado outbreak; Other wikis: Commons: Beryl images

A tornado outbreak spawned by Hurricane Beryl and its remnants impacted the South Central United States, Mississippi Valley, and Northeastern United States between July 8–10, 2024. Hurricane Beryl, which was the first major hurricane of the 2024 Atlantic hurricane season, made landfall in Texas as a Category 1 hurricane, and moved inland over the Southern United States, spawning numerous tornadoes across the states of Texas, Louisiana, and Arkansas on July 8. 110 tornado warnings were issued on July 8 alone, the most for any day in July. The outbreak also set new records for tornado warning issuances in a single day for the National Weather Service Offices in Shreveport and Buffalo, New York, at 67 and 18 respectively. With 71 recorded tornadoes, this was the most prolific tropical cyclone-related tornado outbreak in the United States since Hurricane Rita in 2005. Damages from the outbreak totaled $6.74 million (2024 USD).

== Meteorological synopsis ==
Starting July 6, the Storm Prediction Center outlined a slight risk convective outlook for parts of Texas and Louisiana, stating that dew points in the mid to upper 70s Fahrenheit, along with strong low-level winds and favorable hodographs, would be conducive to the development of tornadoes. On July 7, multiple forecast models were showing the presence of semi-discrete supercells forming, as SRH values ranged between 200–300m²/s², and the SPC stated that a few tornadoes were possible. On July 8, Beryl made landfall near Matagorda, Texas, United States as a Category 1 hurricane.

== Confirmed tornadoes ==
Confirmed tornadoes by Enhanced Fujita rating
EFU	EF0	EF1	EF2	EF3	EF4	EF5	Total
5	13	43	9	1	0	0	71

=== July 8 event ===
List of confirmed tornadoes – Monday, July 8, 2024 (Note: All dates are based on the local time zone where the tornado touched down; however, all times are in Coordinated Universal Time for consistency.)
EF#	Location	County / Parish	State	Start Coord.	Time (UTC)	Path length	Max width
EF1	SW of Jamaica Beach	Galveston	TX	29.1273°N 95.0588°W	06:57–06:59	1.1 mi (1.8 km)	100 yd (91 m)
EF1	A waterspout over the Gulf of Mexico moved onshore, damaging power poles and inflicting significant damage to a home.						
EF2	Western Jasper	Jasper	TX	30.8611°N 94.0058°W	16:01–16:16	8.63 mi (13.89 km)	400 yd (370 m)
EF2	This strong, low-end EF2 tornado tracked through the west side of Jasper. Many power poles and trees were snapped or uprooted and numerous homes and outbuildings were heavily damaged. One person was injured.						
EF1	W of Alto	Cherokee	TX	31.6498°N 95.0968°W	17:04–17:07	1.13 mi (1.82 km)	105 yd (96 m)
EF1	A tornado peeled the metal roof off of a home and snapped or uprooted numerous trees.						
EF1	NNE of Milam	Sabine	TX	31.5147°N 93.7981°W	17:39–17:44	2.84 mi (4.57 km)	440 yd (400 m)
EF1	This high-end EF1 tornado began as a waterspout over Patroon Creek before briefly moving onshore at an RV park on the Holly Park Marina. A couple of RVs were destroyed after being overturned and tossed, a few boats were thrown, a boat dock was ruined, and a small fish cleaning station was destroyed. After crossing over the creek, the tornado snapped or uprooted numerous trees. The tornado then moved into the Toledo Bend Reservoir before dissipating.						
EF1	Appleby to NW of Mahl	Nacogdoches	TX	31.7087°N 94.5787°W	17:40–17:49	8.13 mi (13.08 km)	800 yd (730 m)
EF1	This high-end EF1 tornado collapsed part of the roof of an outbuilding, partially unroofed two homes, and snapped or uprooted numerous trees.						
EF0	NNW of Minden to S of Henderson	Rusk	TX	32.0483°N 94.7371°W	18:06–18:13	3.73 mi (6.00 km)	390 yd (360 m)
EF0	Trees were uprooted and tree limbs were snapped by this high-end EF0 tornado.						
EF1	NW of Huxley to SSE of Joaquin	Shelby	TX	31.821°N 93.9686°W	18:10–18:19	6.67 mi (10.73 km)	375 yd (343 m)
EF1	Mainly tree and timber damage occurred. Most of the track was determined via high-resolution satellite imagery and aerial imagery since most of the area was inaccessible to ground surveys.						
EF2	W of Converse to WSW of South Mansfield	Sabine, DeSoto	LA	31.7808°N 93.714°W	18:15–18:38	16.32 mi (26.26 km)	950 yd (870 m)
EF2	This large EF2 tornado struck a church property, heavily damaging every building there. A mobile home suffered minor roof damage, wooden power poles were snapped, and trees were snapped or uprooted as well.						
EF1	Timpson	Shelby	TX	31.9062°N 94.3975°W	18:15–18:18	2.56 mi (4.12 km)	495 yd (453 m)
EF1	This high-end EF1 tornado touched down in the center of Timpson, ripping almost half the roof off a business, destroying an RV, and snapping or uprooting numerous trees. The tornado then moved northwestward out of the town, snapping several trees before dissipating.						
EF2	N of Belmont to Pleasant Hill to ENE of Mansfield	Sabine, DeSoto	LA	31.742°N 93.5094°W	18:33–19:18	24.96 mi (40.17 km)	900 yd (820 m)
EF2	This large, long-tracked tornado first traveled north along LA 175, producing sporadic tree damage before moving through Pleasant Hill, snapping or uprooting numerous trees and ripping metal roof panels off of a structure. Past Pleasant Hill, two single-wide manufactured homes being used as offices at a refinery were rolled. As the tornado reached LA 346, it ripped large portions of roofs off of two homes and obliterated a mobile home. Many trees were snapped or uprooted, including some that fell on and damaged homes and vehicles. The tornado then continued generally northward, damaging, snapping, or uprooting trees before dissipating.						
EF1	Northern Pelican to NNE of Benson	DeSoto	LA	31.8829°N 93.5856°W	18:39–18:46	3.63 mi (5.84 km)	100 yd (91 m)
EF1	This low-end EF1 tornado snapped or uprooted trees.						
EF1	E of Longstreet, LA to SW of Bethany, LA and TX to NW of Panola, TX	DeSoto (LA), Caddo (LA), Panola (TX), Harrison (TX)	LA, TX	32.0696°N 93.8783°W	18:47–19:36	27.51 mi (44.27 km)	850 yd (780 m)
EF1	This long-tracked tornado snapped or uprooted dozens of trees and downed power poles and powerlines. As the tornado passed close to Keithville, it flipped a single-wide mobile home, before the tornado reached peak intensity in Bethany, causing extensive, very high-end EF1 damage. Some structures were damaged by fallen trees as well. One person was injured in the flipped mobile home, while another was trapped but unscathed.						
EF0	S of Lakeport	Rusk, Gregg	TX	32.3506°N 94.694°W	19:08–19:10	3.13 mi (5.04 km)	270 yd (250 m)
EF0	This high-end EF0 tornado initially damaged trees before and after crossing Lake Cherokee. After causing very sporadic tree damage, the tornado struck the East Texas Regional Airport, where several hangars had their large metal doors knocked down or twisted and some side paneling ripped off as well. Two stop signs were twisted from their base, although this damage was unratable. The tornado then caused some additional tree damage before dissipating.						
EF2	W of Hall Summit to Eastwood to W of Plain Dealing	Red River, Bossier	LA	32.2368°N 93.4359°W	19:15–20:50	53.38 mi (85.91 km)	1,000 yd (910 m)
EF2	2 deaths – See section on this tornado – One person was injured.						
EFU	E of Keachie	DeSoto	LA	32.14°N 93.76°W	19:15–19:26	4.2 mi (6.8 km)	40 yd (37 m)
EFU	High-resolution satellite imagery uncovered a weak path of downed trees through a forested area. A TDS was observed on the nearby radar as well.						
EF1	NE of Tatum to S of Hallsville	Panola, Rusk, Harrison	TX	32.3541°N 94.4591°W	19:19–19:34	9.79 mi (15.76 km)	215 yd (197 m)
EF1	This high-end EF1 tornado snapped or uprooted dozens of trees. Some homes suffered minor siding damage or metal roofing damage as well.						
EF1	E of Scottsville to W of Karnack	Harrison	TX	32.5473°N 94.1397°W	19:46–20:04	9.72 mi (15.64 km)	270 yd (250 m)
EF1	A tornado snapped and uprooted trees before continuing into an inaccessible area.						
EFU	S of Powhatan	Natchitoches	LA	31.8281°N 93.1885°W	19:51–19:53	2.27 mi (3.65 km)	75 yd (69 m)
EFU	A storm chaser captured video of a tornado over an open field. No damage was found.						
EF0	E of Gloster	DeSoto	LA	32.1961°N 93.7719°W	19:57–19:58	0.39 mi (0.63 km)	200 yd (180 m)
EF0	Large tree limbs were downed.						
EF1	Shelbyville to SE of Tenaha	Shelby	TX	31.751°N 94.0513°W	20:18–20:33	11.35 mi (18.27 km)	650 yd (590 m)
EF1	Homes suffered roof damage, power lines were downed, and trees were snapped or uprooted by this high-end EF1 tornado. Much of the track was inaccessible due to the lack of an adequate road network.						
EF1	S of Huxley	Sabine, Shelby	TX	31.58°N 93.8377°W	20:27–20:35	4.99 mi (8.03 km)	650 yd (590 m)
EF1	This high-end EF1 tornado moved along the western shoreline of the Toledo Bend Reservoir, snapping or uprooting dozens of trees, including some that blocked roads. Smaller buildings at a camp were also damaged.						
EF1	WSW of Bienville to E of Sparta	Bienville	LA	32.3227°N 93.0327°W	20:30–20:35	3.31 mi (5.33 km)	300 yd (270 m)
EF1	This tornado formed as the previous tornado was dissipating. Numerous trees were snapped.						
EF1	W of Joaquin to NNE of Tenaha	Shelby, Panola	TX	31.9631°N 94.1415°W	20:41–20:48	5.1 mi (8.2 km)	600 yd (550 m)
EF1	Many trees were snapped or uprooted.						
EF1	W of Noble	Sabine	LA	31.6631°N 93.7807°W	20:42–20:44	1.28 mi (2.06 km)	400 yd (370 m)
EF1	A substantial tree damage signature was noted along the eastern shore of the Toledo Bend Reservoir. Since the tornado came off the water, there was no way to determine if the track was longer than analyzed. Additionally, the entire path of the tornado was confirmed via high resolution satellite data and a radar tornadic debris signature since the area was inaccessible to ground surveys.						
EF1	WSW of Plain Dealing	Bossier	LA	32.8703°N 93.7585°W	20:46–20:52	2.68 mi (4.31 km)	600 yd (550 m)
EF1	This tornado formed as the long-track EF1 Benton tornado was dissipating and was the second one produced by the Eastwood supercell. Numerous trees were snapped.						
EFU	W of Mount Lebanon to E of Dubberly	Bienville, Webster	LA	32.5°N 93.14°W	20:55–21:01	4.2 mi (6.8 km)	765 yd (700 m)
EFU	A TDS was observed on the nearby radar and high-resolution satellite imagery showed a stout path of downed trees.						
EF2	NE of Huxley	Sabine	LA	31.8379°N 93.8362°W	20:59–21:02	1.42 mi (2.29 km)	164 yd (150 m)
EF2	After initially snapping and uprooting countless trees, this strong tornado reached low-end EF2 intensity at an intersection west of Union Springs. It removed most of the roof off a house and blew it into neighboring lawns with a 2x4 from the roof piercing another home. Other homes and cars in the area were damaged by snapped or uprooted trees. The tornado then continued to snap and uproot trees as it moved north-northwestward before dissipating. One person was injured.						
EF0	E of Ida	Bossier	LA	32.9785°N 93.795°W	21:00–21:03	1.96 mi (3.15 km)	50 yd (46 m)
EF0	Some trees were uprooted, and large limbs were snapped. This was the third tornado produced by the Eastwood supercell.						
EF1	NE of Minden	Webster	LA	32.6594°N 93.2067°W	21:01–21:03	1.06 mi (1.71 km)	479 yd (438 m)
EF1	A number of large trees were snapped and uprooted, one of which fell on a home.						
EF1	E of Ida, LA to W of Gin City, AR	Bossier (LA), Lafayette (AR)	LA, AR	33.0044°N 93.7893°W	21:03–21:16	7.06 mi (11.36 km)	300 yd (270 m)
EF1	In Louisiana, this multi-vortex tornado snapped trees and power poles. In Arkansas, the tornado damaged six power poles, including two that were snapped, and laid out a 50 yd-wide (46 m) section of corn. This was the fourth tornado produced by the Eastwood supercell.						
EF1	E of Hughes Springs	Cass	TX	32.9881°N 94.5301°W	21:08–21:16	4.18 mi (6.73 km)	325 yd (297 m)
EF1	A wooden power pole was snapped near its base. Trees were snapped or uprooted as well.						
EF1	E of Converse to NNE of Benson	Sabine, DeSoto	LA	31.7864°N 93.6645°W	21:10–21:26	9.71 mi (15.63 km)	500 yd (460 m)
EF1	Many trees were snapped or uprooted, including some that fell on and damaged structures. Power lines were also downed.						
EF0	WSW of Gin City	Lafayette	AR	33.0662°N 93.8104°W	21:11–21:16	0.98 mi (1.58 km)	25 yd (23 m)
EF0	This was a satellite tornado to the EF1 Gin City tornado. Some large tree limbs were downed. This was the fifth tornado produced by the Eastwood supercell.						
EF1	NE of Minden	Webster	LA	32.6844°N 93.1908°W	21:11–21:14	1.53 mi (2.46 km)	345 yd (315 m)
EF1	Several trees were snapped or uprooted in a convergent pattern.						
EF1	NE of Doddridge to S of Fouke	Miller	AR	33.1427°N 93.8521°W	21:19–21:34	5.44 mi (8.75 km)	95 yd (87 m)
EF1	This erratic tornado removed a few metal panels from a metal barn and snapped or uprooted trees. This was the sixth tornado produced by the Eastwood supercell.						
EF1	W of South Mansfield to S of Grand Cane	DeSoto	LA	32.017°N 93.7865°W	21:25–21:28	2.54 mi (4.09 km)	67 yd (61 m)
EF1	This low-end EF1 tornado damaged trees, including some that were snapped or uprooted.						
EF1	Dykesville to ENE of Shongaloo	Claiborne, Webster	LA	32.9035°N 93.2335°W	21:37–21:44	4.76 mi (7.66 km)	400 yd (370 m)
EF1	This high-end EF1 tornado snapped or uprooted dozens of trees and downed a few power lines.						
EF1	NE of Shongaloo	Webster	LA	32.9457°N 93.2575°W	21:42–21:48	3.93 mi (6.32 km)	375 yd (343 m)
EF1	This tornado touched down as the Dykesville EF1 tornado dissipated and damaged trees.						
EF0	NNE of Mansfield	DeSoto	LA	32.0702°N 93.6522°W	21:44–21:50	3.41 mi (5.49 km)	250 yd (230 m)
EF0	Large tree limbs were downed.						
EF1	NW of Fouke to SE of Texarkana	Miller	AR	33.2914°N 93.9485°W	21:45–21:49	2.06 mi (3.32 km)	50 yd (46 m)
EF1	Trees were snapped and large limbs were downed. This was the seventh tornado produced by the Eastwood supercell.						
EF1	NNE of Shongaloo, LA to SE of Taylor, AR	Webster (LA), Columbia (AR)	LA, AR	32.9748°N 93.2801°W	21:48–21:59	6.5 mi (10.5 km)	300 yd (270 m)
EF1	This tornado touched down as the second Shongaloo EF1 tornado dissipated. In Louisiana, trees were snapped or uprooted, including one tree that fell on a vehicle. A shed was damaged and an old barn had some tin peeled off. The tornado continued to snap or uproot trees after crossing into Arkansas before dissipating.						
EF1	Texarkana	Bowie	TX	33.4357°N 94.0711°W	22:17–22:19	0.21 mi (0.34 km)	240 yd (220 m)
EF1	A tornado ripped roofing off two homes and an older retail building. Additional structures sustained damage from damaged trees. This was the eighth and final tornado produced by the Eastwood supercell.						
EF1	E of Keithville	Caddo	LA	32.3245°N 93.7169°W	22:21–22:25	1.86 mi (2.99 km)	150 yd (140 m)
EF1	Homes suffered minor shingle damage, fences were downed, the metal roof off of a guard station was removed, and many trees were downed.						
EF1	N of Campti to WNW of Creston	Natchitoches	LA	31.9245°N 93.1147°W	23:02–23:11	5.7 mi (9.2 km)	100 yd (91 m)
EF1	Damage was limited to trees.						
EF1	ESE of Sparkman (1st tornado)	Dallas	AR	33.867°N 92.7664°W	23:46–23:55	3.2 mi (5.1 km)	75 yd (69 m)
EF1	This low-end EF1 tornado was a twin to the tornado below. It severely damaged the awning of a carport that was attached to a manufactured home and damaged trees.						
EF1	ESE of Sparkman (2nd tornado)	Dallas	AR	33.8661°N 92.7981°W	23:51–23:56	2.4 mi (3.9 km)	75 yd (69 m)
EF1	This low-end EF1 tornado was a twin to the tornado above. Damage was limited to trees.						
EF2	W of Bernice	Union	LA	32.8145°N 92.7119°W	23:59–00:04	3.21 mi (5.17 km)	750 yd (690 m)
EF2	This strong, low-end EF2 tornado snapped or uprooted hundreds of trees and downed a number of power poles.						
EF2	NE of Spearsville	Union	LA	32.9628°N 92.4918°W	00:42–00:44	1.49 mi (2.40 km)	175 yd (160 m)
EF2	This brief but strong tornado struck a home which was unroofed and had multiple exterior walls knocked down. Two pickup trucks were rolled or thrown into the yard and many trees around the home were damaged as well.						
EF1	NNW of Stephens	Ouachita, Nevada	AR	33.4911°N 93.0834°W	01:00–01:05	2.82 mi (4.54 km)	50 yd (46 m)
EF1	This low-end EF1 tornado damaged a couple of outbuildings and peeled metal roofing off of a large barn. Long swaths of trees were uprooted as well. The survey for this tornado was conducted through geotagged drone imagery from the Camden Fire Department.						
EF1	E of Grapevine	Jefferson	AR	34.1127°N 92.1825°W	03:28–03:35	3.2 mi (5.1 km)	75 yd (69 m)
EF1	This low-end EF1 tornado ripped some metal panels off of a few chicken houses and damaged trees.						
EF0	E of White Hall to Pastoria	Jefferson	AR	34.2732°N 92.0288°W	03:49–03:59	5.8 mi (9.3 km)	75 yd (69 m)
EF0	This weak tornado only caused minor tree damage.						

=== July 9 event ===
List of confirmed tornadoes – Tuesday, July 9, 2024
EF#	Location	County / Parish	State	Start Coord.	Time (UTC)	Path length	Max width
EF1	NW of West	Holmes	MS	33.226°N 89.8325°W	11:08–11:11	0.73 mi (1.17 km)	85 yd (78 m)
EF1	This brief tornado uprooted several trees and broke large tree limbs.						
EF0	NNE of Dubre	Cumberland, Metcalfe	KY	36.8524°N 85.545°W	19:00–19:01	0.9 mi (1.4 km)	200 yd (180 m)
EF0	This high-end EF0 tornado snapped tree limbs and uprooted trees.						
EF1	N of Sturgis to SW of Morganfield	Union	KY	37.602°N 88.01°W	20:26–20:34	3.26 mi (5.25 km)	150 yd (140 m)
EF1	Two homes suffered roof damage, corn was leveled, and trees were snapped or uprooted from this high-end EF1 tornado.						
EF1	W of Morganfield to W of Uniontown	Union	KY	37.683°N 87.975°W	20:40–20:52	6.33 mi (10.19 km)	150 yd (140 m)
EF1	Corn was flattened and trees were snapped or uprooted.						
EF3	Eastern Mount Vernon to E of Solitude	Posey	IN	37.93°N 87.869°W	21:18–21:28	5.84 mi (9.40 km)	300 yd (270 m)
EF3	This tornado touched down just north of the Ohio River causing minor tree and crop damage before quickly strengthening to low-end EF3 intensity and striking a Kenco facility on the east side of Mt. Vernon. The structure had half of its roof removed along with large sections of its outer walls collapsed. Just to the north of there, the tornado damaged power poles, overturned semitrailers, and derailed several train cars. The tornado then continued northward, heavily damaging a mobile home, two homes, outbuildings, and snapping or uprooting trees before dissipating.						
EF1	NNE of Solitude	Posey	IN	38.042°N 87.863°W	21:32–21:39	3.33 mi (5.36 km)	300 yd (270 m)
EF1	This high-end EF1 tornado bent a power pole and snapped or uprooted trees.						
EF1	NW of Buckskin	Gibson	IN	38.2695°N 87.4739°W	16:48–16:49	0.42 mi (0.68 km)	40 yd (37 m)
EF1	A detached garage was destroyed and a residence had about half its roof removed. Two wooden power poles were left leaning and corn was damage in fields.						
EF2	N of Poseyville to N of Johnson	Posey, Gibson	IN	38.18°N 87.786°W	21:51–22:14	8.4 mi (13.5 km)	400 yd (370 m)
EF2	This strong tornado heavily damaged or destroyed mobile homes, outbuildings, crops, and snapped power poles and tree limbs.						
EF1	W of Patoka	Gibson	IN	38.406°N 87.605°W	22:50–22:52	1.04 mi (1.67 km)	25 yd (23 m)
EF1	This tornado leaned a power pole, snapped large tree limbs, and damaged crops.						
EF0	NW of Shoals to NNE of Loogootee	Martin	IN	38.7084°N 86.8399°W	23:21–23:24	1.77 mi (2.85 km)	20 yd (18 m)
EF0	A small, skipping high-end EF0 tornado downed large tree limbs and small trees.						
EFU	E of Burns City	Martin	IN	38.79°N 86.83°W	23:33–23:38	2.3 mi (3.7 km)	800 yd (730 m)
EFU	High-resolution satellite imagery showed a short path of uprooted trees. A TDS was observed on the nearby radar as well.						

=== July 10 event ===
List of confirmed tornadoes – Wednesday, July 10, 2024
EF#	Location	County / Parish	State	Start Coord.	Time (UTC)	Path length	Max width
EF1	NE of Arkwright to SE of Forestville	Chautauqua	NY	42.4187°N 79.1955°W	16:06–16:14	3 mi (4.8 km)	150 yd (140 m)
EF1	Many structures, including homes, suffered varying degrees of roof damage from this high-end EF1 tornado, including some that had their roofs removed and exterior walls knocked down. Many trees were snapped or uprooted as well.						
EF2	SE of Eden	Erie	NY	42.6233°N 78.8745°W	16:40–16:46	3.2 mi (5.1 km)	300 yd (270 m)
EF2	This strong tornado initially damaged multiple buildings, snapped tree limbs, and uprooted shallow trees. After damaging the roof of another structure, the tornado intensified to low-end EF2 strength, destroying multiple farm buildings. From there the tornado weakened slightly, snapping trees at high-end EF1 intensity before abruptly dissipating.						
EF1	N of West Falls to Griffins Mills	Erie	NY	42.7118°N 78.6836°W	16:59–17:06	2.8 mi (4.5 km)	400 yd (370 m)
EF1	This high-end EF1 tornado snapped or uprooted numerous trees. Just before lifting, it struck a newly built horse barn, ripping off a portion of its roof and blowing out windows.						
EF0	NE of Darien	Genesee	NY	42.9344°N 78.3126°W	17:42–17:46	1 mi (1.6 km)	50 yd (46 m)
EF0	Video evidence of a brief tornado was sent in by storm spotters. Damage was generally limited to mangled tree limbs.						
EF1	N of Redfield	Oswego	NY	43.5865°N 75.8484°W	18:23–18:28	2.2 mi (3.5 km)	50 yd (46 m)
EF1	Trees were damaged, including some that were downed.						
EFU	SSW of Fair Haven	Wayne	NY	43.2929°N 76.7271°W	19:09	0.1 mi (0.16 km)	25 yd (23 m)
EFU	Witnesses confirmed that a brief tornado affected vehicular traffic on NY 104A, including one vehicle that was lifted. The tornado could not be rated since the impacts along the roadway were not damage indicators, and no structural or tree damage was found.						
EF0	West London	Middlesex	ON	42.9882°N 81.2778°W	20:00	Insufficient Evidence	Insufficient Evidence
EF0	Video evidence of a brief tornado was reported. Weak tree damage was discovered in a survey.						
EF0	Hyde Park (London)	Middlesex	ON	42.9811°N 81.3397°W	20:00	1.6 mi (2.6 km)	11 yd (10 m)
EF0	Video evidence of a brief tornado was reported. Surveys found weak tree damage and a damage path through cropland.						
EF0	E of Forestport	Oneida	NY	43.45°N 75.16°W	21:59–22:01	1.22 mi (1.96 km)	75 yd (69 m)
EF0	Trees were snapped or uprooted.						

=== Hall Summit–Barksdale Air Force Base–Eastwood–Plain Dealing, Louisiana ===
Hall Summit–Barksdale Air Force Base–Eastwood–Plain Dealing, Louisiana
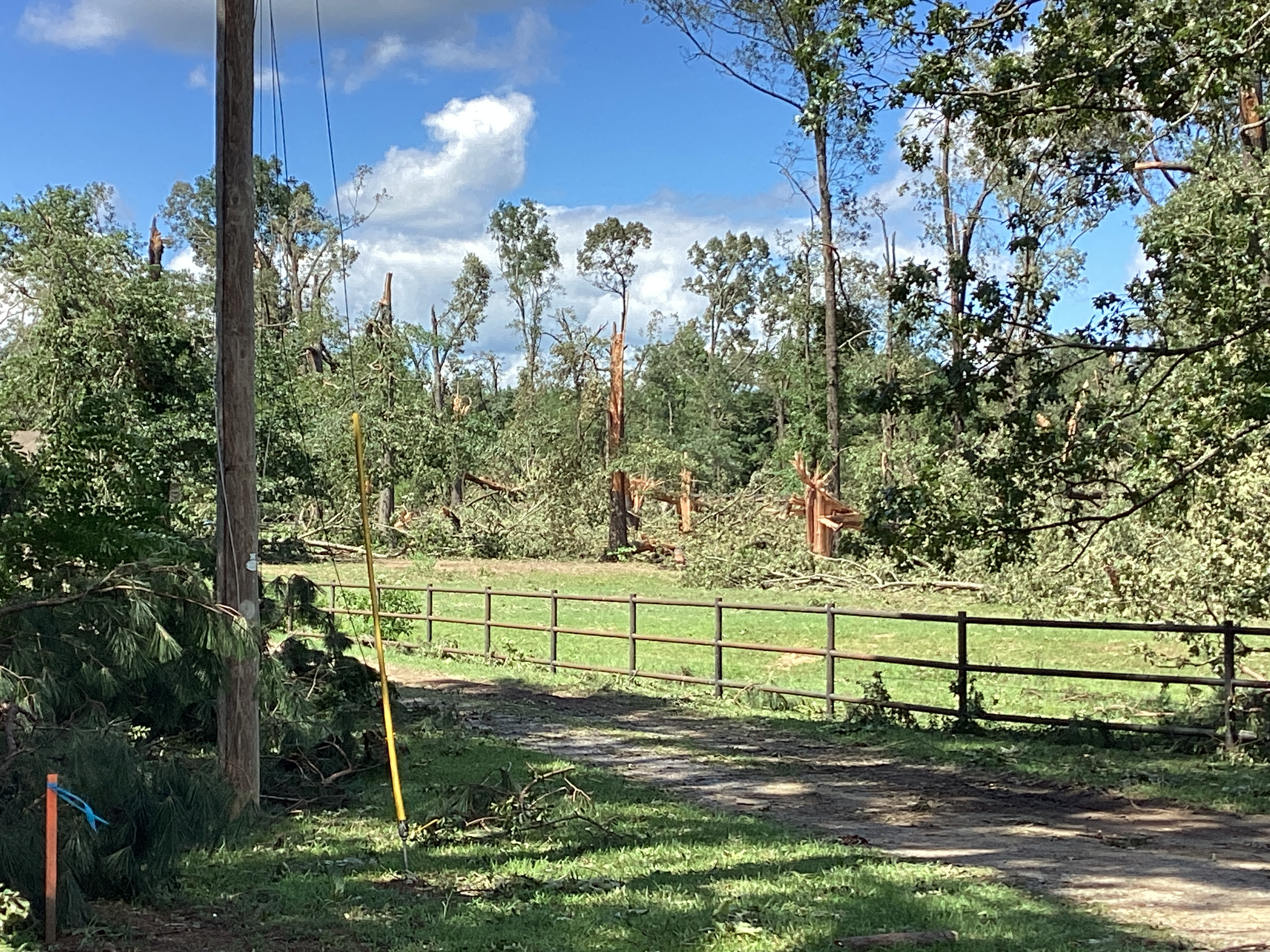
- EF2 damage to trees east of Benton

Meteorological history
- Formed: July 8, 2024, 2:15 p.m. CDT (UTC−05:00)
- Dissipated: July 8, 2024, 3:50 p.m. CDT (UTC−05:00)
- Duration: 1 hour, 35 minutes

EF2 tornado
- on the Enhanced Fujita scale
- Highest winds: 115 mph (185 km/h)

Overall effects
- Fatalities: 2
- Injuries: 1
- Damage: $706,000 (2024 USD)

This large, long-tracked and strong tornado began in extreme northern Red River Parish at 2:15 p.m. CDT and moved north-northwestward, snapping several trees and uprooting more at EF1 intensity. Structural damage in the area was mainly due to fallen trees and remained minor to moderate. The tornado then entered Bossier Parish and briefly weakened to EF0 intensity, damaging trees and power poles before reaching EF1 intensity again as it crossed over US 71 into the Loggy Bayou Wildlife Management Area, continuing to damage trees as it moved over either open or wooded terrain as it moved north-northwestard. East of Elm Grove, 10 trees were uprooted at a residence along LA 154. Another area of intense tree damage occurred along Robinson Road. The tornado continued to track north-northwestward, crossing over the LA 157 and LA 527 snapping or uprooting dozens of trees. Several structures along Sligo Road between Sligo and Oakland were heavily damaged by falling trees before the tornado entered the southeast corner of Barksdale Air Force Base. The tornado moved through the eastern portion of the base at EF0 to low-end EF1 strength, snapping or uprooting trees, snapping power poles, and downing powerlines.

The tornado then exited the base, snapping trees at EF0 strength as it crossed over I-20 and entered Eastwood before reaching EF1 intensity again as it crossed US 79/US 80. Throughout the town, the tornado downed power poles and powerlines and snapped or uprooted trees, including some that fell on and damaged structures. North of town along Bellevue Road, the tornado caused minor damage to a mobile home and snapped or uprooted additional trees. The tornado then caused its most intense damage southeast of and in the Linton community east of Benton. Here, the tornado reached low-end EF2 intensity briefly multiple times, causing a widespread area of higher-end tree damage with large trees being snapped as well. Much of the tree damage was not accessible through ground survey but aerial flight imagery revealed the extent of the damage. Several structures were damaged by fallen trees, including one mobile home along East Linton Road that had a large tree knocked down onto it, killing two women and injuring one child. The tornado continued to cause EF1 powerline and tree damage as it continued north-northwest away from Linton and crossed over LA 162 before it weakened to EF0 strength as it moved over wooded, inaccessible terrain. Damage was generally limited to snapped tree branches as the tornado approached and passed through Hughes. The tornado then turned more northerly and briefly strengthening to EF1 strength as it crossed LA 3, snapping and uprooting trees, including one tree that fell on a small church. It then caused additional EF0 tree damage before reaching EF1 intensity one final time as it moved over LA 2, snapping and uprooting trees before lifting west of Plain Dealing at 3:50 p.m. CDT.

The tornado was on the ground for an hour and 35 minutes, tracked 53.38 mi (85.91 km), and had a peak width of 1,000 yd (910 m). The storm that produced it spawned a total of eight tornadoes, with this one being the first.

== See also ==
- Weather of 2024
- Tornadoes of 2024
- List of North American tornadoes and tornado outbreaks
- List of tornadoes spawned by tropical cyclones
