= 2024–25 SMU Mustangs women's basketball team =

American college basketball season

2024–25 SMU Mustangs women's basketball
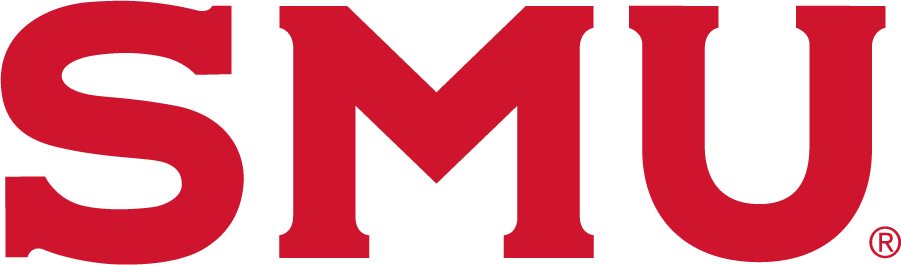
- Conference: Atlantic Coast Conference
- Record: 10–20 (2–16 ACC)
- Head coach: Toyelle Wilson (4th season)
- Associate head coach: Deneen Parker (3rd season)
- Assistant coaches: Danielle Edwards (4th season); Anthony Anderson (3rd season); Alex Furr (2nd season); Carter Mumm (1st season)
- Home arena: Moody Coliseum

2024–25 ACC women's basketball standings
	Conf.				Overall
Team	W		L	PCT	W		L	PCT
No. 9 NC State	16	–	2	.889	28	–	7	.800
No. 8 Notre Dame	16	–	2	.889	28	–	6	.824
No. 7 Duke †	14	–	4	.778	29	–	8	.784
No. 22 Florida State	13	–	5	.722	24	–	9	.727
No. 12 North Carolina	13	–	5	.722	29	–	8	.784
Louisville	13	–	5	.722	22	–	11	.667
California	12	–	6	.667	25	–	9	.735
Virginia Tech	9	–	9	.500	19	–	13	.594
Georgia Tech	9	–	9	.500	22	–	11	.667
Virginia	8	–	10	.444	17	–	15	.531
Stanford	8	–	10	.444	16	–	15	.516
Boston College	6	–	12	.333	16	–	18	.471
Syracuse	6	–	12	.333	12	–	18	.400
Clemson	6	–	12	.333	14	–	17	.452
Pittsburgh	5	–	13	.278	13	–	19	.406
Miami (FL)	4	–	14	.222	14	–	15	.483
Wake Forest	2	–	16	.111	9	–	20	.310
SMU	2	–	16	.111	10	–	20	.333
† 2025 ACC tournament winner Rankings from AP Poll

The 2024–25 SMU Mustangs women's basketball team represented Southern Methodist University during the 2024–25 NCAA Division I women's basketball season. The Mustangs were led by fourth-year head coach Toyelle Wilson and played their home games at Moody Coliseum in University Park, Texas. (Note: University Park and its neighbor of Highland Park form an enclave within Dallas known as the Park Cities. All locations within the Park Cities have a Dallas mailing address.) They competed as first year members of the Atlantic Coast Conference.

The Mustangs started the season 2–1 before taking a trip to Arizona to face their first Power 4 opponents of the year. There, they lost two games against Arizona State and Minnesota. They returned home and went on a three game winning streak, including an overtime victory over Lamar. They lost their next two games, their ACC–SEC Challenge game against Missouri and their ACC season opener against Florida State. The Mustangs would go on to win five of their next six games, and their only loss of the stretch was against number twenty California. They defeated Power 4 opponent Texas Tech, and won conference games against Stanford and Syracuse. The overtime victory against Syracuse was their last win of the season. They ended the season on a fourteen game losing streak. The closest games of the stretch were a one point loss to number seventeen Georgia Tech and one point loss against Pittsburgh.

The Mustangs finished the season 10–20 and 2–16 in ACC play to finish in a tie for seventeenth place. Under the new ACC tournament rules, they did not qualify for the 2025 ACC tournament. They were not invited to the NCAA tournament or the WBIT.

After the season, head coach Toyelle Wilson was fired after four years as head coach. On April 5, it was announced that Adia Barnes would be the new head coach of the Mustangs after being hired away from Arizona, where she had spent the previous nine seasons.

== Previous season ==
The Mustangs finished the 2023–24 season 14–16, 8–10 in AAC play to finish in eleventh place. As the eleventh seed in the AAC tournament, they lost to the fourteenth seed Tulane in the First Round. They were not invited to the NCAA tournament or the WBIT.

== Offseason ==
=== Departures ===
Departures
Name	Num.	Pos.	Height	Year	Hometown	Reason for departure
Tamia Jones	0	G	5'8"	Senior	The Colony, Texas	Transferred to Wake Forest
Tiara Young	1	G	5'9"	Graduate Student	Shreveport, Louisiana	Graduated
Aaliyah Henderson	3	G	5'7"	Freshman	Norman, Oklahoma	Transferred to Texas Southern
Jiya Perry	4	G	5'10"	Sophomore	DeSoto, Texas	Transferred to Delaware
Maya Chandler	10	G	5'7"	Senior	Martinsville, Indiana	Transferred to Miami (OH)
Reagan Bradley	13	G	5'8"	Graduate Student	Little Rock, Arkansas	Graduated
Shanel Reid	14	G	5'11"	Freshman	Austin, Texas	Entered Transfer Portal
Amirah Abdur-Rahim	23	F	6'3"	Senior	Marietta, Georgia	Transferred to Texas A&M

=== Incoming transfers ===
Incoming transfers
Name	Num.	Pos.	Height	Year	Hometown	Previous School
Zanai Jones	1	G	5'5"	Graduate Student	Jersey City, New Jersey	Villanova
Nya Robertson	3	G	5'7"	Junior	Fort Worth, Texas	George Washington
Kaysia Woods	4	F	6'0"	Senior	Lincoln, Nebraska	Xavier
Sandra Magolico	13	F	6'2"	Senior	Maputo, Mozambique	Arizona State
Nicole Rodriguez	17	G	5'8"	Graduate Student	Eastvale, California	Loyola Marymount
Brianna McLeod	25	C	6'3"	Junior	Brampton, Ontario	Colorado

=== Recruiting ===
College recruiting
Name	Hometown	School	Height	Weight	Commit date
Kayanna Cox; G	Tenaha, Texas	Tenaha	5 ft 10 in (1.78 m)	N/A	
Kayanna Cox; G	Recruit ratings: ESPN: (NR)				
Overall recruit ranking:
Note: In many cases, Scout, Rivals, 247Sports, On3, and ESPN may conflict in their listings of height and weight.; In these cases, the average was taken. ESPN grades are on a 100-point scale.; Sources:

== Roster ==
2024–25 SMU Mustangs women's basketball team
Players
Coaches

Pos.	#	Name	Height	Year	Previous school	Hometown
G	1	Zanai Jones	5 ft 5 in (1.65 m)	GS	Hudson Catholic; Villanova	Jersey City, NJ
G	2	TK Pitts	6 ft 1 in (1.85 m)	Jr	Union High School	Lubbock, TX
G	3	Nya Robertson	5 ft 7 in (1.7 m)	Jr	Boswell; George Washington	Fort Worth, TX
F	4	Kaysia Woods	6 ft 0 in (1.83 m)	Sr	Lincoln; Xavier	Lincoln, NE
G	5	Ella Brow	5 ft 8 in (1.73 m)	RS So	Palm Beach Currumbin	Palm Beach, Australia
G	12	Kayanna Cox	5 ft 10 in (1.78 m)	Fr	Tenaha	Tenaha, TX
F	13	Sandra Magolico	6 ft 2 in (1.88 m)	Sr	Escola Secundária da Polana; Arizona State	Maputo, Mozambique
G	17	Nicole Rodriguez	5 ft 8 in (1.73 m)	GS	Rosary Academy; Loyola Marymount	Eastvale, CA
G	22	Kylie Marshall	5 ft 11 in (1.8 m)	So	Lake Ridge; Texas A&M	Mansfield, TX
G	24	Donavia Hall	5 ft 10 in (1.78 m)	Jr	Plano East	Plano, TX
F	25	Brianna McLeod	6 ft 3 in (1.91 m)	Jr	Kings Christian; Colorado	Brampton, ON
F	33	Chantae Embry	6 ft 1 in (1.85 m)	Sr	Norman; Texas Tech	Norman, OK
C	35	Jessica Peterson	6 ft 2 in (1.88 m)	Sr	Etiwanda; Fresno State	Rancho Cucamonga, CA

Head coach

- Toyelle Wilson (Manhattan)

Assistant coach(es)

- Deneen Parker (Stephen F. Austin)
- Danielle Edwards (Clemson)
- Anthony Anderson (FIU)
- Alex Furr (Fresno State)
- Carter Mumm (Iowa State)

Legend

- (C) Team captain
- (S) Suspended
- (I) Ineligible
- (W) Walk-on
- Injured
- Current redshirt

Roster
Last update: August 29, 2024

== Schedule and results ==
Date time, TV	Rank^{#}	Opponent^{#}	Result	Record	High points	High rebounds	High assists	Site (attendance) city, state
Regular season
November 4, 2024*; 4:30 p.m., ACCNX		North Carolina A&T	W 77–64	1–0	21 – Robertson	11 – Peterson	7 – Jones	Moody Coliseum (953); University Park, TX
November 9, 2024*; 1:00 p.m., ACCNX		Old Dominion	L 70–79	1–1	29 – Robertson	11 – Peterson	5 – Brow	Moody Coliseum (1,094); University Park, TX
November 12, 2024*; 11:00 a.m., ACCNX		Western Michigan	W 72–44	2–1	16 – Robertson	8 – Peterson	5 – Pitts	Moody Coliseum (2,719); University Park, TX
November 16, 2024*; 4:30 p.m., ESPN+		at Arizona State; Briann January Classic	L 73–80	2–2	25 – Robertson	6 – Tied	4 – Tied	Desert Financial Arena (1,356); Tempe, AZ
November 17, 2024*; 1:00 p.m., ESPN+		vs. Minnesota; Briann January Classic	L 56–65	2–3	28 – Robertson	9 – Pitts	2 – Tied	Desert Financial Arena; Tempe, AZ
November 22, 2024*; 4:30 p.m., ACCNX		Lamar	W 56–54 ^{OT}	3–3	19 – Robertson	17 – Peterson	4 – Jones	Moody Coliseum (802); University Park, TX
November 25, 2024*; 7:00 p.m., ACCNX		Arkansas–Pine Bluff	W 82–58	4–3	14 – Tied	12 – Peterson	5 – Brow	Moody Coliseum (356); University Park, TX
November 29, 2024*; 7:00 p.m., ACCNX		UT Arlington	W 71–46	5–3	29 – Robertson	21 – Peterson	6 – Brow	Moody Coliseum (927); University Park, TX
December 5, 2024*; 8:00 p.m., SECN		at Missouri; ACC–SEC Challenge	L 61–68	5–4	18 – Marshall	14 – Peterson	3 – Robertson	Mizzou Arena (2,358); Columbia, MO
December 8, 2024; 1:00 p.m., ACCN		at Florida State	L 85–93	5–5 (0–1)	22 – Embry	9 – Embry	7 – Jones	Donald L. Tucker Center (1,731); Tallahassee, FL
December 11, 2024*; 7:00 p.m., ACCNX		Texas Tech	W 61–57	6–5	14 – Tied	12 – Tied	8 – Jones	Moody Coliseum (1,834); University Park, TX
December 19, 2024*; 6:00 p.m., ESPN+		at North Texas	W 74–66	7–5	21 – Robertson	19 – Peterson	3 – Robertson	UNT Coliseum (1,668); Denton, TX
December 20, 2024*; 4:00 p.m.		vs. Chicago State	W 73–52	8–5	16 – Tied	16 – Peterson	3 – Jones	UNT Coliseum (398); Denton, TX
January 2, 2025; 7:00 p.m., ACCN		Stanford	W 67–63	9–5 (1–1)	21 – Robertson	16 – Peterson	5 – Jones	Moody Coliseum (1,446); University Park, TX
January 5, 2025; 5:00 p.m., ACCN		No. 20 California	L 66–81	9–6 (1–2)	22 – Robertson	13 – Peterson	5 – Jones	Moody Coliseum (1,323); University Park, TX
January 9, 2025; 9:30 a.m., ACCNX		at Syracuse	W 72–71 ^{OT}	10–6 (2–2)	28 – Robertson	8 – Magolico	7 – Jones	JMA Wireless Dome (2,856); Syracuse, NY
January 12, 2025; 12:00 p.m., ACCNX		at Pittsburgh	L 59–72	10–7 (2–3)	23 – Robertson	11 – Peterson	5 – Jones	Peterson Events Center (290); Pittsburgh, PA
January 16, 2025; 7:00 p.m., ACCNX		No. 14 North Carolina	L 33–64	10–8 (2–4)	12 – Woods	12 – Peterson	3 – Robertson	Moody Coliseum (1,195); University Park, TX
January 19, 2025; 5:00 p.m., ACCN		at No. 3 Notre Dame	L 64–88	10–9 (2–5)	20 – Jones	13 – Peterson	5 – Jones	Purcell Pavilion (7,904); Notre Dame, IN
January 23, 2025; 7:00 p.m., ACCN		No. 14 Duke	L 46–81	10–10 (2–6)	10 – Robertson	8 – Peterson	4 – Brow	Moody Coliseum (1,496); University Park, TX
January 26, 2025; 11:00 a.m., ACCNX		at Miami (FL)	L 63–70	10–11 (2–7)	14 – Pitts	20 – Peterson	5 – Jones	Watsco Center (2,858); Coral Gables, FL
January 30, 2025; 7:00 p.m., ACCN		Louisville	L 75–80	10–12 (2–8)	32 – Robertson	9 – Peterson	5 – Jones	Moody Coliseum (1,148); University Park, TX
February 2, 2025; 1:00 p.m., ACCNX		at Virginia Tech	L 71–79	10–13 (2–9)	22 – Robertson	11 – Peterson	3 – Jones	Cassell Coliseum (5,762); Blacksburg, VA
February 6, 2025; 6:00 p.m., ACCNX		at No. 17 Georgia Tech	L 69–70	10–14 (2–10)	19 – Pitts	15 – Peterson	5 – Jones	McCamish Pavilion (1,442); Atlanta, GA
February 9, 2025; 2:00 p.m., ACCNX		Pittsburgh	L 57–58	10–15 (2–11)	15 – Robertson	15 – Peterson	8 – Jones	Moody Coliseum (1,623); University Park, TX
February 16, 2025; 3:00 p.m., ACCN		Clemson	L 46–72	10–16 (2–12)	14 – Robertson	10 – Peterson	3 – Tied	Moody Coliseum (1,751); University Park, TX
February 20, 2025; 5:00 p.m., ACCNX		at Wake Forest	L 64–67	10–17 (2–13)	17 – Peterson	18 – Peterson	3 – Pitts	LJVM Coliseum (856); Winston-Salem, NC
February 23, 2025; 1:00 p.m., ACCNX		at Boston College	L 78–87	10–18 (2–14)	21 – Tied	5 – Pitts	4 – Pitts	Conte Forum (1,122); Chestnut Hill, MA
February 27, 2025; 7:00 p.m., ACCNX		Virginia	L 51–63	10–19 (2–15)	16 – Jones	9 – Peterson	3 – Jones	Moody Coliseum (1,251); University Park, TX
March 2, 2025; 11:00 a.m., ACCN		at No. 9 NC State	L 45–69	10–20 (2–16)	17 – Jones	10 – Peterson	5 – Jones	Reynolds Coliseum (1,193); Raleigh, NC
*Non-conference game. ^{#}Rankings from AP Poll. (#) Tournament seedings in parentheses. All times are in Central.
