= Shelbyville High School (Texas) =

Location
- 343 W FM 417; Shelbyville, Texas 75973-0325; United States; 31.7569°N 94.0786°W

Information
- School type: Public high school
- School district: Shelbyville Independent School District
- Principal: Mario Osby
- Grades: 9-12
- Enrollment: 227 (2023–2024)
- Colors: Red & Black
- Athletics conference: UIL Class AA
- Mascot: Dragons/Lady Dragons
- Yearbook: Dragon
- Website: Shelbyville High School

Shelbyville High School is a public high school located in the unincorporated community of Shelbyville, Texas, USA and classified as a 2A school by the UIL. It is a part of the Shelbyville Independent School District located in southeastern Shelby County. In 2015, the school was rated "Met Standard" by the Texas Education Agency.

== Athletics ==
The Shelbyville Grady Clays compete in these sports:

Volleyball, Cross Country, Football, Basketball, Powerlifting, Track, Baseball & Softball

=== State Titles ===
- Baseball
  - 1988(2A)
- Boys Basketball
  - 1982(2A), 1984(2A) 2019(2A) 2020(2A)
