= Texas State Highway Loop 168 =

State highway in Texas

State Highway Loop 168

Route information
- Maintained by TxDOT
- Length: 0.074 mi (119 m)
- Existed: August 23, 1945–present

Major junctions
- West end: FM 947 in Tenaha
- East end: Loop 157 in Tenaha

Location
- Country: United States
- State: Texas
- Counties: Shelby

Highway system
- Highways in Texas; Interstate; US; State; Former; Toll; Loops; Spurs; FM/RM; Park; Rec
← Loop 167	→ Spur 169

Loop 168 is a state highway loop in the town of Tenaha in Shelby County, Texas.

== Route description ==
The western terminus of Loop 168 is at FM 947. The route travels to the east along Wall Street before ending at Loop 157 one block north of that route's intersection with US 59 / US 84.

According to TxDOT, Loop 168 is the shortest numbered route in Texas, with a total length of 0.074 miles (0.119 km), or approximately 391 feet (119 m). However, Spur 200 has a certified length of only 0.050 miles (0.080 km).

== History ==
When originally designated on August 23, 1945, Loop 168 connected with US 59 at both ends; the western terminus was at US 59/US 84 one block farther south; the route turned along Main Street to an intersection with US 59, and the eastern terminus was at its present location, at the former alignment of US 59 through northeastern Tenaha. On December 12, 1950, the western end was moved to its current location, with FM 947, which was commissioned on November 23, 1948, being designated over that section of Main Street. On February 2, 1983, when US 59 was rerouted to the east, the old route through Tenaha along Center Street was actually designated as Loop 168, and the one-block route along Wall Street was designated as Spur 168. It is unclear as to whether this change was signed, as on May 29, 1985, old US 59 had its designation changed to Loop 157, and Loop 168 reverted to its previous routing.

== Major intersections ==
The entire route is in Tenaha, Shelby County.

mi	km	Destinations	Notes
0.00	0.00	FM 947 (Main Street) – Timpson	Western terminus
0.07	0.11	Loop 157	Eastern terminus
1.000 mi = 1.609 km; 1.000 km = 0.621 mi
