= Ashton, Texas =

Ghost town in Texas, US

Ashton
- Ghost town
- Location in Texas
- Coordinates: 31.88378060°N 93.98046820°W
- Country: United States
- State: Texas
- County: Shelby

Ashton is a ghost town in Shelby County, Texas, United States.

Ashton is situated on Farm to Market Road 139 and beside the Sabine River. It was settled in the first half of the 19th century, with a post office operating there from 1847 to 1854. The town declined in the 1880s, alongside the decline of riverboats on the Sabine, which often docked at Ashton. Despite such, the town's two schools continued service until further transportation advancements forced them to consolidate. The schools closed in 1956, and the community was abandoned by 1893.
