= Shelby County Courthouse =

Shelby County Courthouse may refer to:

- Shelby County Courthouse (Alabama), Columbiana, Alabama
- Old Shelby County Courthouse, Columbiana, Alabama
- Shelby County Courthouse (Illinois), Shelbyville, Illinois
- Shelby County Courthouse (Indiana), Shelbyville, Indiana
- Shelby County Courthouse (Iowa), Harlan, Iowa
- Shelby County Courthouse (Ohio), Sidney, Ohio
- Shelby County Courthouse (Tennessee), Memphis, Tennessee
- Shelby County Courthouse (Texas), Center, Texas, listed on the National Register of Historic Places
