= Arcadia, Texas =

Arcadia, Texas, may refer to:

- Arcadia, Santa Fe, Texas, a neighborhood in Santa Fe, Galveston County, Texas
- Arcadia, Shelby County, Texas
