= Shelbyville Independent School District =

School district in Texas

Coordinates: 31°45′25″N 94°4′43″W

Shelbyville Independent School District is a public school district based in the community of Shelbyville, Texas, United States. The district is located in southeastern Shelby County and includes part of Huxley. A small portion of northwestern Sabine County is served by the district. In 2009, the school district was rated "academically acceptable" by the Texas Education Agency.

== Campuses ==
Shelbyville ISD has three campuses:

- Shelbyville High School
- Shelbyville Middle School
- Shelbyville Elementary School
