= Dreka, Texas =

Unincorporated community in Texas, United States

Coordinates: 31°40′30″N 93°57′23″W

Dreka is a tiny unincorporated community in southeastern Shelby County, Texas, United States. It is situated southeast of Center, on Farm to Market Road 2427.

Founded circa 1890, a post office was established there in 1894 but was closed in 1907. Martin Shofner was the postmaster. In 1933, an estimated 25 people lived in the community, with one business. By 1946, a church a store and a gin were established, but by 1988 only the church remained.
