= Tenaha High School =

Location
- 138 College Street; Tenaha, Texas 75974-0318; United States; 31.945630°N 94.246484°W

Information
- School type: Public High School
- School district: Tenaha Independent School District
- Principal: Linda Jacobs
- Teaching staff: 35.89 (FTE)
- Grades: PK-12
- Enrollment: 459 (2023-2024)
- Student to teacher ratio: 12.79
- Colors: Maroon, Orange & White
- Athletics conference: UIL Class AA
- Mascot: Tiger
- Yearbook: Tiger
- Website: Tenaha High School

Tenaha High School is a public high school located in Tenaha, Texas (USA) and classified as a 2A school by the UIL. It is part of the Tenaha Independent School District located in north central Shelby County. In 2013, the school was rated "Met Standard" by the Texas Education Agency.

== Athletics ==
The Tenaha Tigers compete in these sports -

- Baseball
- Basketball
- Cross Country
- Football
- Tennis
- Track and field

=== State Titles ===
- Boys Basketball -
  - 2003(1A/D1)
- Football -
  - 1998(1A), 2011(1A/D2)
- Marching Band
  - 2021(2A)

==== State Finalists ====
- Football -
  - 1996(1A), 2012(1A/D2), 2017(2A/D2)
