= Joaquin Independent School District =

School district in Texas

Location
- 11109 Hwy 84 East, Joaquin, Texas 75954 United States of America

District information
- Grades: PK - 12
- Superintendent: Ryan Fuller
- Budget: $8,319,609

Other information
- Website: www.joaquinisd.net

Joaquin Independent School District is a public school district based in Joaquin, Texas, United States. Located in northeastern Shelby County, the district extends into a small portion of Panola County. A portion of the district (connected to the other by a portion of Toledo Bend Reservoir) is located in southeastern Shelby County and includes parts of Huxley. In 2009, the school district was rated "recognized" by the Texas Education Agency.

== Schools ==
- Joaquin High School (Grades 9-12)
- Joaquin Junior High School (Grades 6-8)
- Joaquin Elementary School (Grades PK-5)
