= Tenaha Independent School District =

School district in Texas

Tenaha Independent School District is a public school district based in Tenaha, Texas (USA). It is located in north-central Shelby County. The district extends into a small portion of Panola County. In 2013, the school district was rated "academically acceptable" by the Texas Education Agency.

Tenaha ISD has three campuses -

- Tenaha High School (Grades 9-12)
- Tenaha Middle School (Grades 6-8)
- Tenaha Elementary School (Grades PK-5)
