= Mahl, Texas =

Mahl
- Unincorporated community
- Location in Texas Location in the United States
- Coordinates: 31°44′02″N 94°40′35″W
- Country: United States
- State: Texas
- County: Nacogdoches
- Established: 1902
- Elevation: 490 ft (150 m)

Population (1990)
  - Total: 1 family (actual number in family members unknown)
- GNIS feature ID: 1380131

Mahl is an unincorporated community in Nacogdoches County, Texas, United States. It is located on Highway 259 near the City of Nacogdoches.

== History ==
Mahl was founded in the early 1900s during the Gilded Age when the Texas and New Orleans Railroad was built. The town derived its name after the last name of a local railroad official, albeit spelled backwards. The post office was built later that year and the local school was founded in 1904, serving nearly 60 students. The time that the town was the most popular was in the mid 1910s, when the town had two stores, the school, saloon, blacksmith, cotton gin, and home to approximately 100 residents. Then, the two world wars caused the town to decline in residents, and by the 1950s the school and the last few businesses shut down. In 1990, one household was recorded as a "Mahlite".

== Education ==
The Central Heights Independent School District serves the one household in Mahl.

Also nearby the town is the Todd Agricultural Research Center, an off-campus agricultural farm part of the Stephen Fuller Austin State University down in Nacagdoches, Texas.
