= Dykesville, Louisiana =

Unincorporated community in Louisiana, U.S.

Coordinates: 32°54′56″N 93°14′02″W

Dykesville is an unincorporated community in Claiborne Parish, Louisiana, in the United States.

A post office was established at Dykesville in 1886, and remained in operation until it was discontinued in 1906.
