= Arcadia, Shelby County, Texas =

Unincorporated community in Texas, United States

Coordinates: 31°45′48″N 94°20′26″W

Arcadia (formerly Arcada) is a small unincorporated community in Shelby County, Texas, United States. It sits at an elevation of 351 feet (107 m).
