= Huxley, Texas =

- City
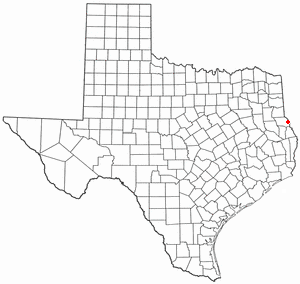
- Location of Huxley, Texas

- Coordinates: 31°45′42″N 93°53′15″W
- Country: United States
- State: Texas
- County: Shelby

Area
  - Total: 2.08 sq mi (5.40 km^{2})
  - Land: 2.04 sq mi (5.29 km^{2})
  - Water: 0.042 sq mi (0.11 km^{2})
- Elevation: 279 ft (85 m)

Population (2020)
  - Total: 361
  - Density: 177/sq mi (68.2/km^{2})
- Time zone: UTC-6 (Central (CST))
  - Summer (DST): UTC-5 (CDT)
- ZIP code: 75973
- Area code: 936
- FIPS code: 48-35636
- GNIS feature ID: 2410086

Huxley is a city in Shelby County, Texas, United States. Its population was 361 at the 2020 census.

== Geography ==
According to the United States Census Bureau, the city has a total area of 2.0 square miles (5.3 km^{2}), of which 0.04 sq mi (0.1 km^{2}) (1.96%) is covered by water.

== Demographics ==
Historical population
Census	Pop.	Note	%±
1970	208		—
1980	341		63.9%
1990	335		−1.8%
2000	298		−11.0%
2010	385		29.2%
2020	361		−6.2%
U.S. Decennial Census; 2020 Census

=== 2020 census ===
As of the 2020 census, Huxley had a population of 361 and a median age of 51.6 years; 18.6% of residents were under 18 and 29.1% were 65 or older. For every 100 females, there were 91.0 males, and for every 100 females 18 and over, there were 90.9 males 18 and over.

Of the 153 households in Huxley, 21.6% had children under 18 living in them, 53.6% were married-couple households, 16.3% were households with a male householder and no spouse or partner present, 26.1% were households with a female householder and no spouse or partner present, 30.7% were made up of individuals, and 16.3% had someone living alone who was 65 or older. The city had 269 housing units, of which 43.1% were vacant; the homeowner vacancy rate was 6.1%, and the rental vacancy rate was 15.8%.

None of residents lived in urban areas, while 100.0% lived in rural areas.

Racial composition as of the 2020 census
Race	Number	Percent
White	332	92.0%
Black or African American	1	0.3%
American Indian and Alaska Native	0	0.0%
Asian	0	0.0%
Native Hawaiian and other Pacific Islander	0	0.0%
Some other race	13	3.6%
Two or more races	15	4.2%
Hispanic or Latino (of any race)	18	5.0%

=== 2000 census ===
As of the census of 2000, 298 people, 135 households, and 103 families resided in the city. The population density was 148.8 inhabitants per square mile (57.5/km^{2}). The 230 housing units had an average density of 114.8 per square mile (44.3/km^{2}). The racial makeup of the city was 98.32% White, 1.34% African American, and 0.34% Native American. Hispanic or Latino people of any race were 0.67% of the population.

Of the 135 households, 17.0% had children under 18 living with them, 70.4% were married couples living together, 3.7% had a female householder with no husband present, and 23.0% were not families. About 20.0% of all households were made up of individuals, and 10.4% had someone living alone who was 65 or older. The average household size was 2.21, and the average family size was 2.50.

In the city, the age distribution was 13.1% under 18, 3.7% from 18 to 24, 18.1% from 25 to 44, 33.2% from 45 to 64, and 31.9% who were 65 or older. The median age was 56 years. For every 100 females, there were 106.9 males. For every 100 females 18 and over, there were 97.7 males.

The median income in the city for a household was $32,143 and for a family was $40,000. Males had a median income of $41,875 versus $20,625 for females. The per capita income for the city was $19,504. About 7.5% of families and 9.6% of the population were below the poverty line, including 24.4% of those under 18 and 4.6% of those 65 or over.

== Education ==
Public education in the city of Huxley is provided by the Shelbyville and Joaquin Independent School Districts.
