= National Register of Historic Places listings in Shelby County, Texas =

Location of Shelby County in Texas

This is a list of the National Register of Historic Places listings in Shelby County, Texas.

This is intended to be a complete list of properties listed on the National Register of Historic Places in Shelby County, Texas. There is one property listed on the National Register in the county. This property is both a State Antiquities Landmark and a Recorded Texas Historic Landmark.

This National Park Service list is complete through NPS recent listings posted March 21, 2025.

== Current listings ==
The locations of National Register properties may be seen in a mapping service provided.

	Name on the Register	Image	Date listed	Location	City or town	Description
1	Shelby County Courthouse Square	Shelby County Courthouse Square	March 31, 1971 (#71001074); November 29, 1990 boundary increase (#90001819)	Courthouse Sq. 31°47′41″N 94°10′53″W	Center	State Antiquities Landmark, Recorded Texas Historic Landmark

== See also ==
- National Register of Historic Places listings in Texas
- Recorded Texas Historic Landmarks in Shelby County
