= Benson, Louisiana =

- Unincorporated community
- Location within Louisiana Location within the United States
- Coordinates: 31°51′59″N 93°41′38″W
- Country: United States
- State: Louisiana
- Parish: DeSoto
- Elevation: 256 ft (78 m)
- Time zone: UTC-6 (Central (CST))
  - Summer (DST): UTC-5 (CDT)
- Area code: 318
- GNIS feature ID: 542982

Benson is an unincorporated community in DeSoto Parish, Louisiana, United States.

Located approximately halfway between Mansfield and Converse on the Kansas City Southern Railroad, it is an historic sawmill town.
