= Joaquin, Texas =

- City
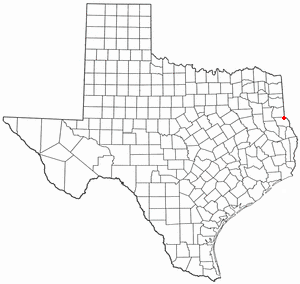
- Location of Joaquin, Texas

- Coordinates: 31°57′57″N 94°03′02″W
- Country: United States
- State: Texas
- County: Shelby

Area
  - Total: 2.34 sq mi (6.07 km^{2})
  - Land: 2.34 sq mi (6.05 km^{2})
  - Water: 0.0039 sq mi (0.01 km^{2})
- Elevation: 213 ft (65 m)

Population (2020)
  - Total: 734
  - Density: 340/sq mi (133/km^{2})
- Time zone: UTC-6 (Central (CST))
  - Summer (DST): UTC-5 (CDT)
- ZIP code: 75954
- Area code: 936
- FIPS code: 48-37684
- GNIS feature ID: 2410143
- Website: cityofjoaquin.net

Joaquin (/hwɑːˈkiːn/ whah-KEEN; Spanish: Joaquín [xoaˈkin]) is a city in northeastern Shelby County, Texas, United States. Founded in 1885, it was named after Joaquin Morris, grandson of the original land owner, Benjamin Franklin Morris. Its population was 734 at the 2020 census. It is located on U.S. Highway 84 (future Interstate 69) and the tracks of the Southern Pacific Railroad.

== Geography ==
According to the United States Census Bureau, the city has a total area of 2.3 square miles (6.0 km^{2}), of which 2.3 square miles (6.0 km^{2}) are land and 0.43% is covered by water.

== History ==
The site was founded in 1885 for a station for the Houston, East and West Texas Railway. The land was donated by Benjamin Franklin Morris, and the site was named for his grandson Joaquin Lopez . The post office was opened in the following year. The site operated as a shipping point for cotton and lumber, with a lumber mill functioning there. The town was incorporated in 1940, with a population increase with the development of the Toledo Bend Reservoir years later.

== Demographics ==
Historical population
Census	Pop.	Note	%±
1930	407		—
1940	487		19.7%
1950	579		18.9%
1960	528		−8.8%
1970	819		55.1%
1980	917		12.0%
1990	805		−12.2%
2000	925		14.9%
2010	824		−10.9%
2020	734		−10.9%
U.S. Decennial Census

=== 2020 census ===
As of the 2020 census, Joaquin had a population of 734, with 298 households and 238 families residing in the city. The median age was 37.7 years, 24.1% of residents were under the age of 18, and 18.7% of residents were 65 years of age or older. For every 100 females there were 97.8 males, and for every 100 females age 18 and over there were 101.1 males age 18 and over.

0.0% of residents lived in urban areas, while 100.0% lived in rural areas.

There were 298 households in Joaquin, of which 33.6% had children under the age of 18 living in them. Of all households, 38.9% were married-couple households, 23.5% were households with a male householder and no spouse or partner present, and 30.5% were households with a female householder and no spouse or partner present. About 32.2% of all households were made up of individuals and 15.4% had someone living alone who was 65 years of age or older.

There were 363 housing units, of which 17.9% were vacant. The homeowner vacancy rate was 2.7% and the rental vacancy rate was 14.1%.

Racial composition as of the 2020 census
Race	Number	Percent
White	509	69.3%
Black or African American	121	16.5%
American Indian and Alaska Native	8	1.1%
Asian	4	0.5%
Native Hawaiian and Other Pacific Islander	0	0.0%
Some other race	46	6.3%
Two or more races	46	6.3%
Hispanic or Latino (of any race)	86	11.7%

=== 2000 census ===
As of the 2000 census, 925 people, 349 households, and 244 families resided in the city. The population density was 401.6 inhabitants per square mile (155.1/km^{2}). The 400 housing units averaged 173.7/sq mi (67.1/km^{2}). The racial makeup of the city was 77.84% White, 19.03% African American, 0.86% Native American, 1.08% from other races, and 1.19% from two or more races. Hispanics or Latinos of any race were 3.14% of the population.

Of the 349 households, 33.2% had children under the age of 18 living with them, 50.4% were married couples living together, 16.0% had a female householder with no husband present, and 29.8% were not families. About 27.2% of all households were made up of individuals, and 14.9% had someone living alone who was 65 years of age or older. The average household size was 2.65 and the average family size was 3.26.

In the city, the population was distributed as 29.1% under the age of 18, 8.1% from 18 to 24, 27.8% from 25 to 44, 21.4% from 45 to 64, and 13.6% who were 65 years of age or older. The median age was 34 years. For every 100 females, there were 89.5 males. For every 100 females age 18 and over, there were 85.3 males.

The median income for a household in the city was $23,611, and for a family was $34,000. Males had a median income of $25,938 versus $17,000 for females. The per capita income for the city was $12,232. About 19.1% of families and 25.5% of the population were below the poverty line, including 26.6% of those under age 18 and 34.8% of those age 65 or over.

== Education ==
Public education in the city of Joaquin is provided by the Joaquin Independent School District.

== Media ==
The Light and Champion, a news and information company, marked its 140th year of operation in 2017. It serves Shelby County, as well as Logansport, Louisiana.

== Notable people ==
- Winston Hill, NFL offensive tackle and Hall of Famer, was born in Joaquin on October 23, 1941
- Orren Ray Whiddon, lieutenant general in the United States Army
