= Shelbyville, Texas =

Unincorporated community in Texas, US

Coordinates: 31°45′42″N 94°04′43″W

Shelbyville is an unincorporated community and census-designated place in Shelby County, Texas, United States. As of the 2020 census, Shelbyville had a population of 100. It is located seven miles southeast of Center on State Highway 87 and is close to Toledo Bend reservoir.

The Shelbyville Independent School District serves area students.

== Historical development ==
The town was founded in the 1820s with settlers from the Nashville, Tennessee, region. The town was originally called'Nashville, but was renamed Shelbyville in 1837 to honor American Revolution hero and Kentucky Governor Isaac Shelby. The post office was later opened in 1843.

Shelbyville became the flashpoint in the Regulator–Moderator War, with most of its major battles being fought in the town or nearby. A Republic of Texas post office had been established by 1843. In 1866, in a contested fight for the county seat, county records were spirited away in the dead of night and Center became the new seat of Shelby County.

The population of Shelbyville in 1884 was 150, which doubled by 1914. It reached a peak in 1929, with an estimated population of 600, but declined by half during the Great Depression. It slowly increased, reaching 550 residents in the late 1940s, but fell again—reaching 215 by the late 1980s—the same number given for the 2000 census.

== Demographics ==
Historical population
Census	Pop.	Note	%±
2010	100		—
2020	100		0.0%
U.S. Decennial Census; 1850–1900 1910; 1920 1930 1940; 1950 1960 1970; 1980 1990 2000; 2010 2020

Shelbyville first appeared as a census designated place in the 2020 U.S. census.

=== 2020 Census ===
Shelbyville CDP, Texas – Racial and ethnic composition Note: the US Census treats Hispanic/Latino as an ethnic category. This table excludes Latinos from the racial categories and assigns them to a separate category. Hispanics/Latinos may be of any race.
Race / Ethnicity (NH = non-Hispanic)	Pop 2020	% 2020
White alone (NH)	79	79.00%
Black or African American alone (NH)	8	8.00%
Native American or Alaska Native alone (NH)	0	0.00%
Asian alone (NH)	1	1.00%
Native Hawaiian or Pacific Islander alone (NH)	0	0.00%
Other race alone (NH)	0	0.00%
Multiracial (NH)	4	4.00%
Hispanic or Latino (any race)	8	8.00%
Total	100	100.00%

== Media ==
The Light and Champion, a news and information company, marked its 140th year of operation in 2017. It serves Shelby County, as well as Logansport, Louisiana. The Light and Champion produces a weekly print edition and a weekly free-distribution print product called The Merchandiser. The Light and Champion is owned by Times Media Group, based in Tempe, Arizona.
