= Tenaha, Texas =

- Town
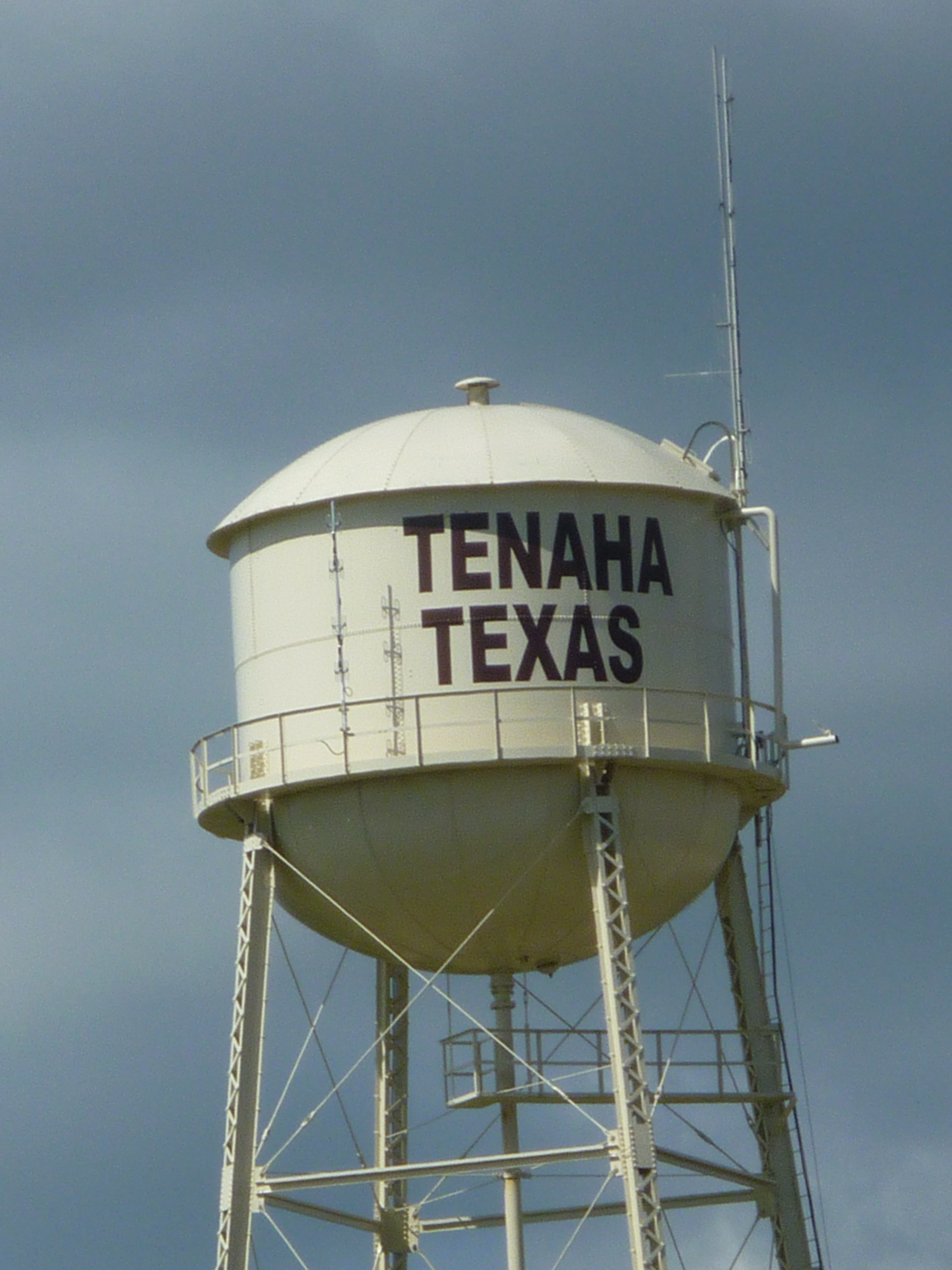

- Location within Shelby County (left) and Texas
- Coordinates: 31°56′37″N 94°15′08″W
- Country: United States
- State: Texas
- County: Shelby
- Established: 1886

Area
  - Total: 3.76 sq mi (9.74 km^{2})
  - Land: 3.75 sq mi (9.70 km^{2})
  - Water: 0.015 sq mi (0.04 km^{2})
- Elevation: 354 ft (108 m)

Population (2020)
  - Total: 989
  - Density: 306.1/sq mi (118.18/km^{2})
- Time zone: UTC-6 (Central (CST))
  - Summer (DST): UTC-5 (CDT)
- ZIP code: 75974
- Area code: 936
- FIPS code: 48-72188
- GNIS feature ID: 2413374

Tenaha is a town in Shelby County, Texas, United States. The population was 989 at the 2020 census.

== History ==
Tenaha was established on February 2, 1886. The community was named by members of the Hicks family (Cherokee) for Tenehaw Municipality, from the Spanish, the original name of Shelby County.

== Geography ==
According to the United States Census Bureau, the town has a total area of 4.0 square miles (10.3 km^{2}), of which 4.0 square miles (10.2 km^{2}) is land and 0.04 square miles (0.1 km^{2}) (0.50%) is water.

== Demographics ==
Historical population
Census	Pop.	Note	%±
1910	491		—
1920	577		17.5%
1930	591		2.4%
1940	608		2.9%
1950	715		17.6%
1960	1,097		53.4%
1970	1,094		−0.3%
1980	1,005		−8.1%
1990	1,072		6.7%
2000	1,046		−2.4%
2010	1,160		10.9%
2020	989		−14.7%
U.S. Decennial Census

Tenaha racial composition as of 2020 (NH = Non-Hispanic) (Note: Note: the US Census treats Hispanic/Latino as an ethnic category. This table excludes Latinos from the racial categories and assigns them to a separate category. Hispanics/Latinos can be of any race.)
Race	Number	Percentage
White (NH)	271	27.4%
Black or African American (NH)	349	35.29%
Native American or Alaska Native (NH)	1	0.1%
Some Other Race (NH)	1	0.1%
Mixed/Multi-Racial (NH)	26	2.63%
Hispanic or Latino	341	34.48%
Total	989	

As of the 2020 United States census, there were 989 people, 559 households, and 394 families residing in the town.

As of the census of 2010, there were 1,160 people, 422 households, and 287 families residing in the town. The population density was 268.4 inhabitants per square mile (103.6/km^{2}). There were 475 housing units at an average density of 122.3 per square mile (47.2/km^{2}). The racial and ethnic makeup of the town was 37.6% non-Hispanic African American, 36.6% non-Hispanic White, 24.0% Hispanic or Latino of any race, and 1.9% other.

Of the 422 households, 36.0% had children under the age of 18 living with them, 41.2% were married couples living together, 20.6% had a female householder with no husband present, and 32.0% were non-families. 26.3% of all households were made up of individuals living alone; 12.3% had someone living alone who was 65 years of age or older. The average household size was 2.75 and the average family size was 3.33.

In the town, the population was spread out, with 32.2% under the age of 18, 8.7% from 18 to 24, 26.7% from 25 to 44, 20.7% from 45 to 64, and 11.8% who were 65 years of age or older. The median age was 32 years. For every 100 females, there were 85.5 males. For every 100 females age 18 and over, there were 80.4 males.

The median income for a household in the town was $23,750, and mean household income was $31,055. Median family income was $26,154, and mean family income was $32,600. The town's per capita income was $11,600. About 33.6% of families and 35.9% of the population were below the poverty line, including 46.4% of those under age 18 and 30.4% of those aged 65 or over.

== Infrastructure ==
=== Police department ===
==== Asset forfeiture controversy ====
In 2009, Tenaha became a defendant in a class action lawsuit over allegations that local police regularly made improper seizures of cash, jewelry, and property from African-American and Latino motorists passing through the town. Arrested drivers were given a choice of either going to jail on money-laundering felony charges or handing over all their valuables in order to be allowed to walk free. In one case a couple surrendered $6,000 to keep their children out of child protection services. In addition to taking of valuables from motorists who were not criminally charged, Tenaha officials allegedly agreed to lenient sentences for known drug traffickers in exchange for cash forfeitures.

Between 2006 and 2008, Tenaha Marshal’s Office used state forfeiture regulations to seize property from nearly 200 motorists. In about 50 of the cases, suspects were charged with drug possession. But in 147 incidents, marshals seized cash, jewelry, cell phones and automobiles even though no contraband was found, and the motorist was not charged with any crime. Many of these were African-American or Latino drivers. At least 150 motorists had property seized by Tenaha marshal’s office, totaling more than US$3 million.

=== Transportation ===
Tenaha is located on a junction of U.S. Routes 59, 84 and 96. In the future, Interstate 69 and Interstate 369 is planned to intersect at Tenaha.

== Education ==
Public education in the town of Tenaha is provided by the Tenaha Independent School District. The best known alumnus of Tenaha High School is Jim Wilkinson (James R. Wilkinson), who gave up plans to become an undertaker to go to work for Republican Congressman Dick Armey in 1992. He served as General Tommy R. Franks' director of strategic communications, and is deputy national security advisor for communications as of December 2003.

== Media ==
The Light and Champion, a news and information company, serves Shelby County, as well as Logansport, Louisiana.

== Notable people ==
- Bobo Barnett, a circus clown whose career lasted from the late 1920s to the early 1970s
- Wayne Christian, Republican state representative for Shelby and neighboring counties
- George Peddy, State representative for Shelby County
