= Shelby County, Texas =

County in Texas, United States

- County
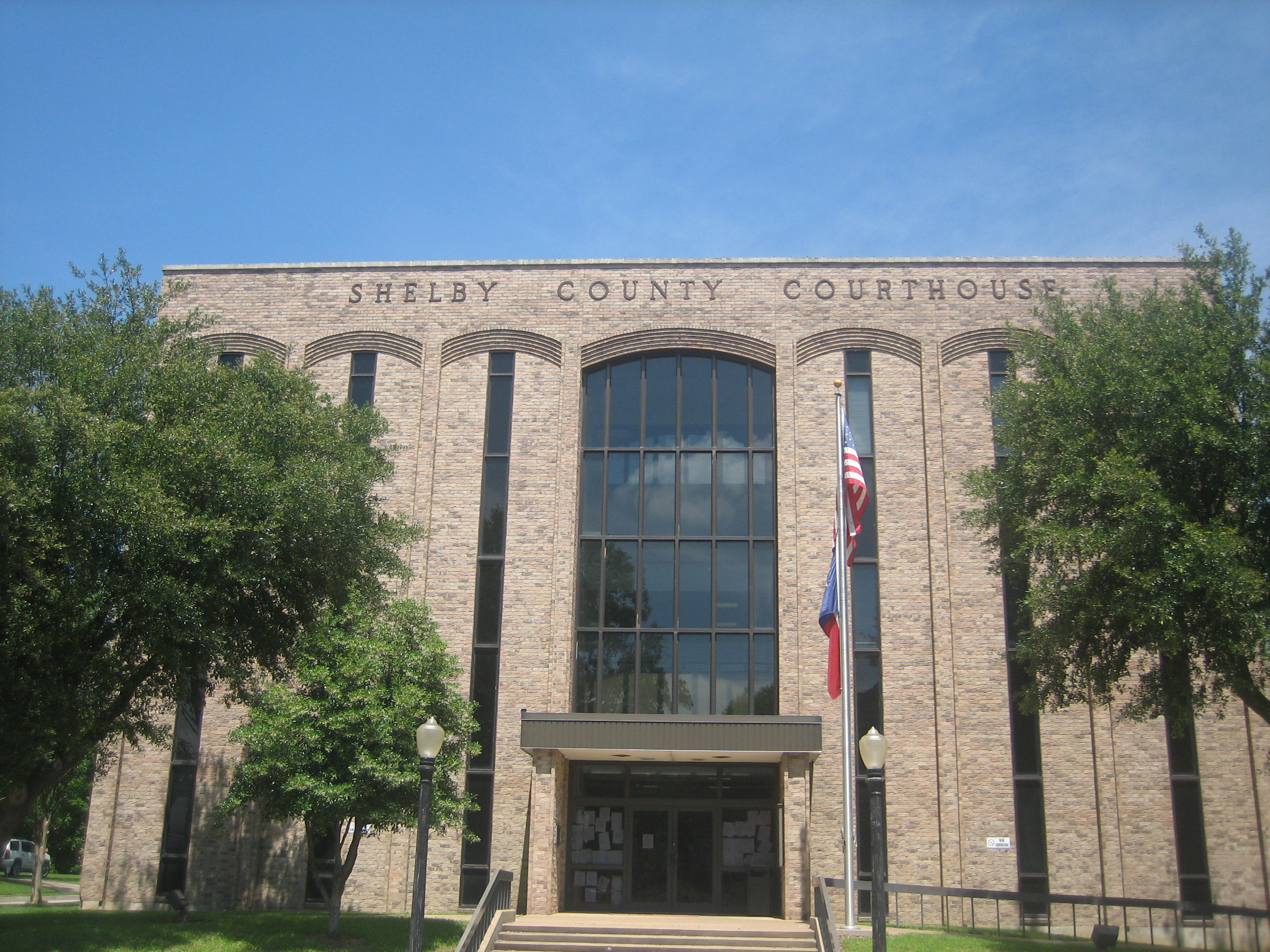
- Shelby County Courthouse in Center

- Location within the U.S. state of Texas
- Coordinates: 31°47′N 94°08′W
- Country: United States
- State: Texas
- Founded: 1837
- Named for: Isaac Shelby
- Seat: Center
- Largest city: Center

Area
  - Total: 835 sq mi (2,160 km^{2})
  - Land: 796 sq mi (2,060 km^{2})
  - Water: 39 sq mi (100 km^{2}) 4.7%

Population (2020)
  - Total: 24,022
  - Estimate (2025): 24,286 ▲
  - Density: 30.2/sq mi (11.7/km^{2})
- Time zone: UTC−6 (Central)
  - Summer (DST): UTC−5 (CDT)
- Congressional district: 1st
- Website: www.co.shelby.tx.us

Shelby County is a county located in the far eastern portion of the U.S. state of Texas. As of the 2020 census, its population was 24,022. Its county seat is Center. The county was established in 1835 as a municipality of Mexico and organized as a county in 1837. It is named for Isaac Shelby, a soldier in the American Revolution who was a governor of Kentucky.

== History ==
Shelby County was established in 1837. It was named for Isaac Shelby, a soldier from Tennessee during the American Revolution, and first and fifth governor of Kentucky.

== Geography ==
According to the U.S. Census Bureau, the county has a total area of 835 square miles (2,160 km^{2}), of which 796 square miles (2,060 km^{2}) are land and 39 square miles (100 km^{2}) (4.7%) are covered by water.

=== Adjacent counties and parishes ===
- Panola County (north)
- De Soto Parish, Louisiana (northeast)
- Sabine Parish, Louisiana (east)
- Sabine County (south)
- San Augustine County (south)
- Nacogdoches County (southwest)
- Rusk County (northwest)

=== National protected area ===
- Sabine National Forest (part)

== Demographics ==
Historical population
Census	Pop.	Note	%±
1850	4,239		—
1860	5,362		26.5%
1870	5,732		6.9%
1880	9,532		66.3%
1890	14,365		50.7%
1900	20,452		42.4%
1910	26,423		29.2%
1920	27,464		3.9%
1930	28,627		4.2%
1940	29,235		2.1%
1950	23,479		−19.7%
1960	20,479		−12.8%
1970	19,672		−3.9%
1980	23,084		17.3%
1990	22,034		−4.5%
2000	25,224		14.5%
2010	25,448		0.9%
2020	24,022		−5.6%
2025 (est.)	24,286	▲	1.1%
U.S. Decennial Census; 1850–2010 2010–2020

=== Racial and ethnic composition ===
Shelby County, Texas – Racial and ethnic composition Note: the US Census treats Hispanic/Latino as an ethnic category. This table excludes Latinos from the racial categories and assigns them to a separate category. Hispanics/Latinos may be of any race.
Race / Ethnicity (NH = Non-Hispanic)	Pop 1980	Pop 1990	Pop 2000	Pop 2010	Pop 2020	% 1980	% 1990	% 2000	% 2010	% 2020
White alone (NH)	17,884	16,719	17,564	16,535	14,416	77.47%	75.88%	69.63%	64.98%	60.01%
Black or African American alone (NH)	4,853	4,710	4,881	4,414	3,805	21.02%	21.38%	19.35%	17.35%	15.84%
Native American or Alaska Native alone (NH)	75	34	75	61	50	0.32%	0.15%	0.30%	0.24%	0.21%
Asian alone (NH)	12	30	57	76	364	0.05%	0.14%	0.23%	0.30%	1.52%
Native Hawaiian or Pacific Islander alone (NH)	x	x	3	0	14	x	x	0.01%	0.00%	0.06%
Other race alone (NH)	0	2	14	17	49	0.00%	0.01%	0.06%	0.07%	0.20%
Multiracial (NH)	x	x	141	181	639	x	x	0.56%	0.71%	2.66%
Hispanic or Latino (any race)	260	539	2,489	4,164	4,685	1.13%	2.45%	9.87%	16.36%	19.50%
Total	23,084	22,034	25,224	25,448	24,022	100.00%	100.00%	100.00%	100.00%	100.00%

=== 2020 census ===
As of the 2020 census, the county had a population of 24,022. The median age was 40.1 years; 24.8% of residents were under 18 and 18.2% were 65 or older. For every 100 females, there were 98.1 males, and for every 100 females 18 and over. there were 95.2 males 18 and over.

The racial makeup of the county was 62.9% White, 16.0% Black or African American, 0.6% American Indian and Alaska Native, 1.5% Asian, 0.1% Native Hawaiian and Pacific Islander, 10.6% from some other race, and 8.4% from two or more races. Hispanic or Latino residents of any race comprised 19.5% of the population.

About 21.3% of residents lived in urban areas, while 78.7% lived in rural areas.

Of the 9,309 households in the county, 32.6% had children under 18 living in them, 48.7% were married-couple households, 19.3% were households with a male householder and no spouse or partner present, and 27.3% were households with a female householder and no spouse or partner present. About 27.9% of all households were made up of individuals, and 13.9% had someone living alone who was 65 or older.

The county had 11,420 housing units, of which 18.5% were vacant. Among occupied housing units, 74.0% were owner-occupied and 26.0% were renter-occupied. The homeowner vacancy rate was 1.4% and the rental vacancy rate was 10.5%.

=== 2000 census ===
As of the census of 2000, 25,224 people, 9,595 households, and 6,908 families resided in the county. The population density was 32 people per square mile (12 people/km^{2}). The 11,955 housing units averaged 15 units per square mile (5.8 units/km^{2}). The racial makeup of the county was 72.65% White, 19.44% African American, 0.36% Native American, 0.23% Asian, 0.02% Pacific Islander, 5.87% from other races, and 1.44% from two or more races. About 9.87% of the population was Hispanic or Latino of any race.

Of the 9,595 households, 32.4% had children under 18 living with them, 55.1% were married couples living together, 12.9% had a female householder with no husband present, and 28.0% were not families. About 25.4% of all households were made up of individuals, and 13.6% had someone living alone who was 65 or older. The average household size was 2.59 and the average family size was 3.08.

In the county, the population was distributed as 26.6% under 18, 8.8% from 18 to 24, 25.8% from 25 to 44, 22.2% from 45 to 64, and 16.6% who were 65 or older. The median age was 37 years. For every 100 females, there were 92.4 males. For every 100 females 18 and over, there were 89.2 males.

The median income in the county for a household was $29,112 and for a family was $34,021. Males had a median income of $26,501 versus $20,280 for females. The per capita income for the county was $15,186. About 14.9% of families and 19.4% of the population were below the poverty line, including 24.7% of those under 18 and 16.9% of those 65 or over.

== Education ==
These school districts serve Shelby County:

- Center Independent School District (ISD)
- Excelsior ISD
- Joaquin ISD (small portion in Panola County)
- San Augustine ISD (mostly in San Augustine County)
- Shelbyville ISD (small portion in Sabine County)
- Tenaha ISD (small portion in Panola County)
- Timpson ISD

All of Shelby County is in the service area of Panola College.

== Media ==
The Light and Champion, a news and information company, marked its 140th year of operation in 2017. It serves Shelby County, as well as Logansport, Louisiana. The Light and Champion produces a weekly print edition, a weekly free-distribution print product called The Merchandiser, operates a web site, www.lightandchampion.com, and a Facebook page. The Light and Champion is owned by Times Media Group, based in Tempe, Arizona.

== Transportation ==
=== Major highways ===
  - Interstate 69 is currently under construction and will follow the current route of U.S. 59 in most places west of Tenaha and the current route of U.S. 84 in most places east of Tenaha to the Louisiana state line.
- U.S. Highway 59
  - Interstate 369 is currently under construction and will follow the current route of U.S. 59 in most places north of Tenaha.
- U.S. Highway 84
- U.S. Highway 96
- State Highway 7
- State Highway 87
- State Highway 147
- Loop 157
- Loop 168
- Loop 500
- Spur 470
- Farm to Market Road 139
- Farm to Market Road 1970

US 59 passes through Shelby County. It is planned to be upgraded to interstate standards as part of the planned Interstate 69 north to Tenaha, where the planned Interstate 369 will follow US 59 northward to both Interstate 30 and Interstate 49 in Texarkana. US 84 is planned to be upgraded to interstate standards as part of the planned Interstate 69 from Tenaha to the Louisiana state line.

=== Mass transportation ===
Greyhound Lines operates the Center Station at the Shelby County's Best Yogurt store in Center.

== Communities ==
=== Cities ===
- Center (county seat)
- Huxley
- Joaquin
- Timpson

=== Town ===
- Tenaha

=== Census-designated place ===
- Shelbyville

=== Unincorporated communities ===
- Arcadia
- Dreka
- Patroon
- Possum Trot

== Gallery ==
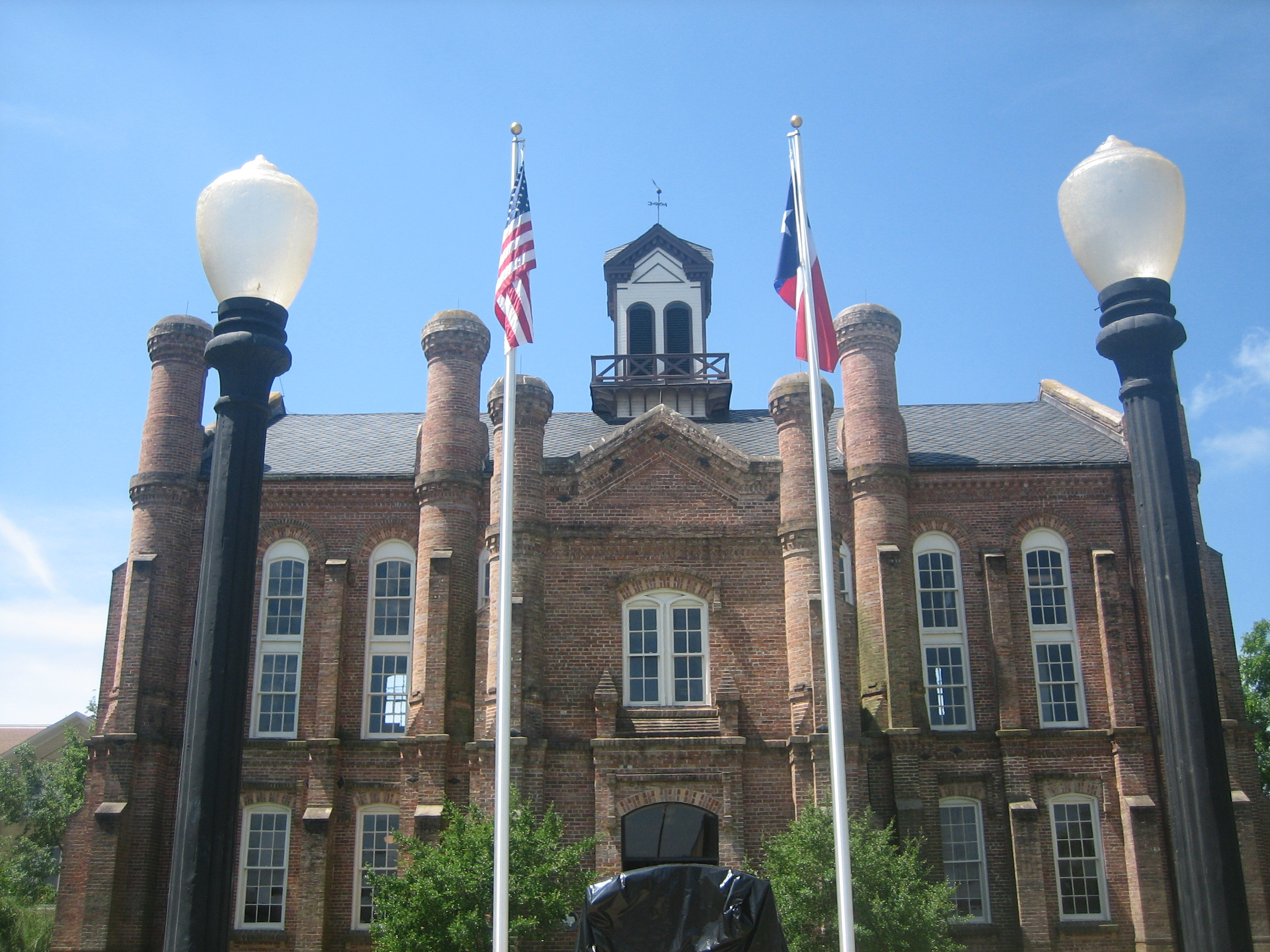
Previous Shelby County Courthouse established in 1885 remains the base of the downtown section in Center

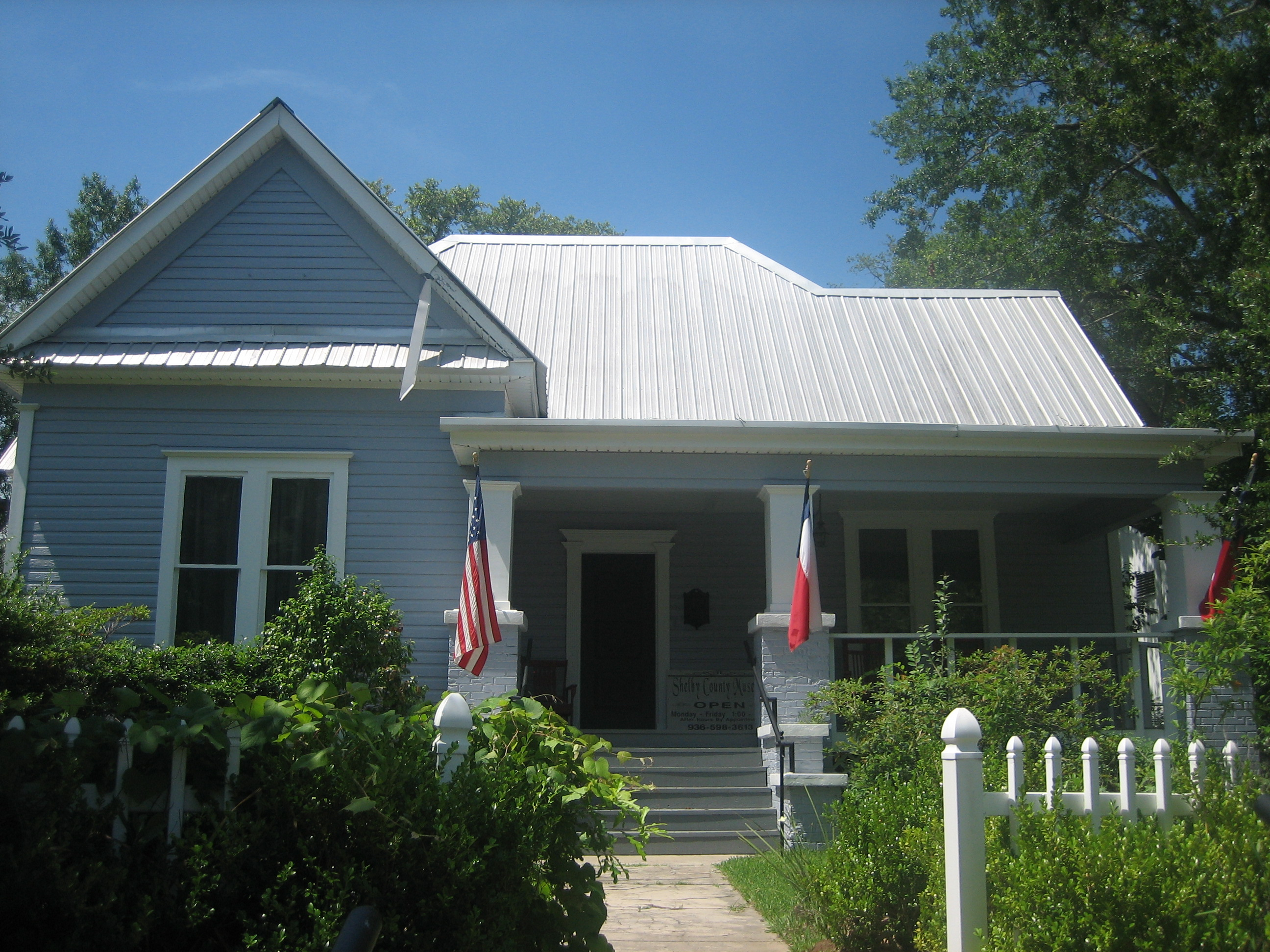
The Shelby County Museum in Center is located in a former residence

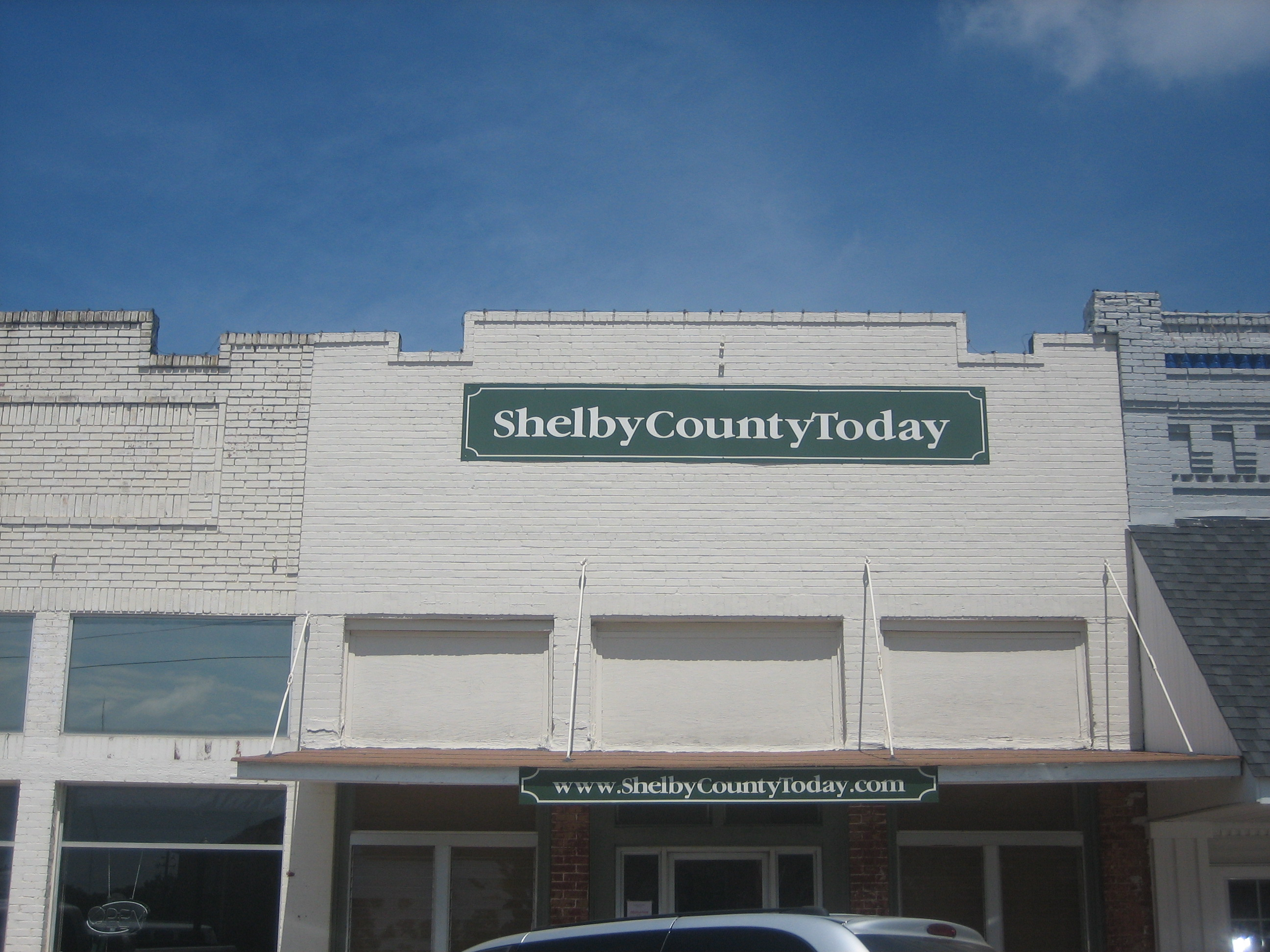
Shelby County Today is an on-line newspaper located across from the Shelby County Courthouse. It began operations in 2005

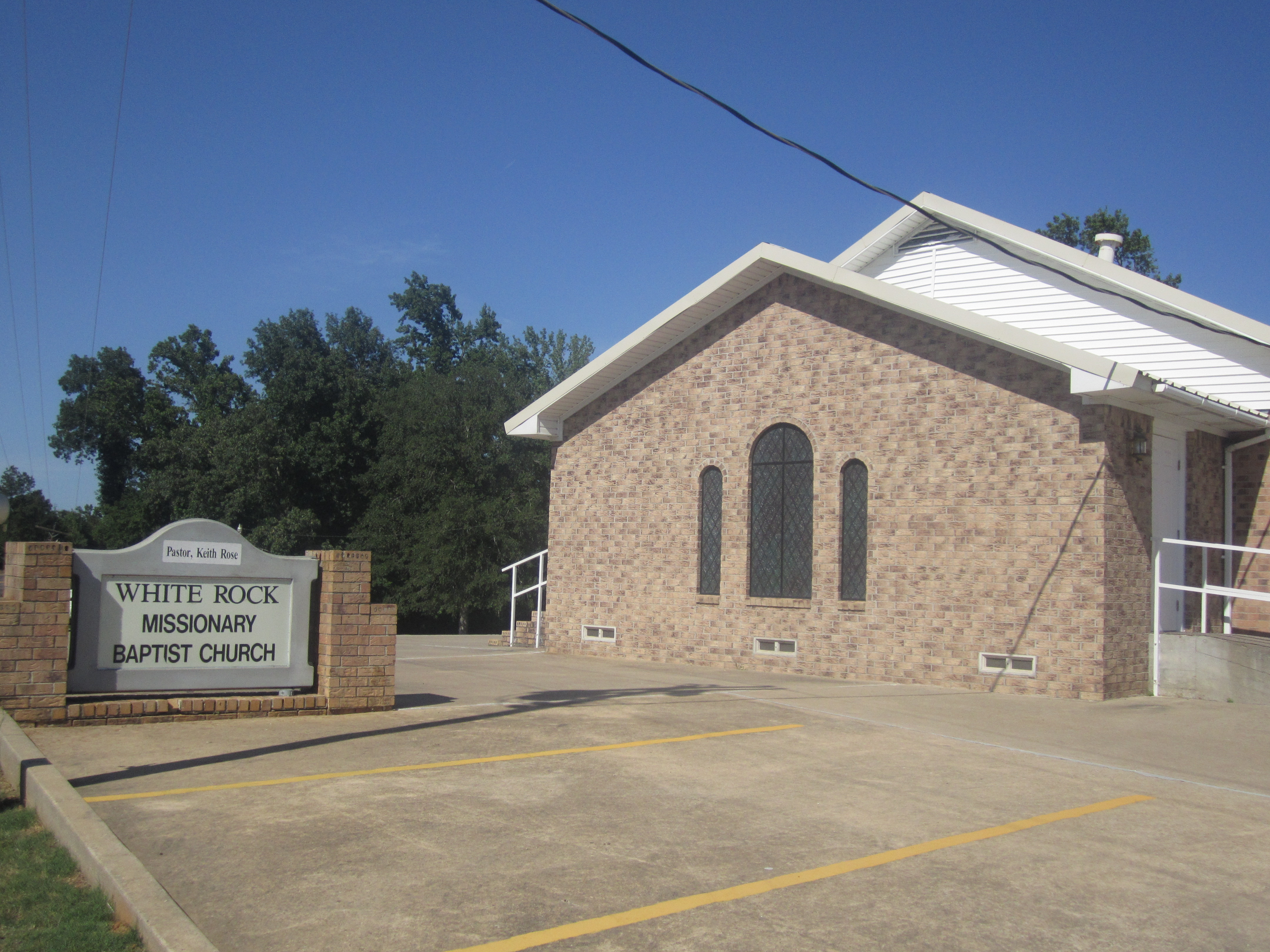
Among rural East Texas churches is the White Rock Missionary Baptist Church and Cemetery at 12555 Texas State Highway 7 near Center

== Politics ==
An example of the political trends of rural East Texas, Shelby usually voted Democratic in the 20th century, but has turned into a Republican stronghold in the 21st.

United States presidential election results for Shelby County, Texas
Year	Republican		Democratic		Third party(ies)	
Year	No.	%	No.	%	No.	%
1912	76	4.02%	1,507	79.74%	307	16.24%
1916	131	6.30%	1,767	84.99%	181	8.71%
1920	150	6.42%	1,700	72.77%	486	20.80%
1924	160	4.33%	3,408	92.16%	130	3.52%
1928	676	25.53%	1,961	74.06%	11	0.42%
1932	120	3.21%	3,594	96.25%	20	0.54%
1936	136	4.11%	3,167	95.62%	9	0.27%
1940	349	6.88%	4,720	93.10%	1	0.02%
1944	428	12.01%	2,927	82.13%	209	5.86%
1948	307	7.61%	3,051	75.59%	678	16.80%
1952	1,792	29.63%	4,249	70.27%	6	0.10%
1956	1,988	36.54%	3,403	62.56%	49	0.90%
1960	1,679	33.63%	3,266	65.41%	48	0.96%
1964	2,220	38.87%	3,487	61.06%	4	0.07%
1968	1,127	16.28%	2,511	36.27%	3,285	47.45%
1972	4,292	70.45%	1,792	29.42%	8	0.13%
1976	2,695	36.48%	4,680	63.35%	12	0.16%
1980	3,500	44.85%	4,215	54.01%	89	1.14%
1984	4,863	57.21%	3,610	42.47%	28	0.33%
1988	3,999	48.34%	4,261	51.50%	13	0.16%
1992	3,217	36.96%	3,986	45.79%	1,502	17.25%
1996	3,482	43.27%	3,720	46.22%	846	10.51%
2000	5,692	63.21%	3,227	35.84%	86	0.96%
2004	6,295	67.84%	2,951	31.80%	33	0.36%
2008	6,630	71.91%	2,548	27.64%	42	0.46%
2012	6,879	74.03%	2,322	24.99%	91	0.98%
2016	7,179	79.01%	1,758	19.35%	149	1.64%
2020	7,975	79.06%	2,068	20.50%	44	0.44%
2024	8,164	82.07%	1,741	17.50%	43	0.43%

United States Senate election results for Shelby County, Texas1
Year	Republican		Democratic		Third party(ies)	
Year	No.	%	No.	%	No.	%
2024	8,022	81.23%	1,756	17.78%	98	0.99%

United States Senate election results for Shelby County, Texas2
Year	Republican		Democratic		Third party(ies)	
Year	No.	%	No.	%	No.	%
2020	7,868	78.74%	2,022	20.24%	102	1.02%

Texas Gubernatorial election results for Shelby County
Year	Republican		Democratic		Third party(ies)	
Year	No.	%	No.	%	No.	%
2022	5,846	84.33%	1,045	15.08%	41	0.59%

== See also ==
- National Register of Historic Places listings in Shelby County, Texas
- Recorded Texas Historic Landmarks in Shelby County
- Impact of the 2019–20 coronavirus pandemic on the meat industry in the United States
